= Votes on the death of Louis XVI =

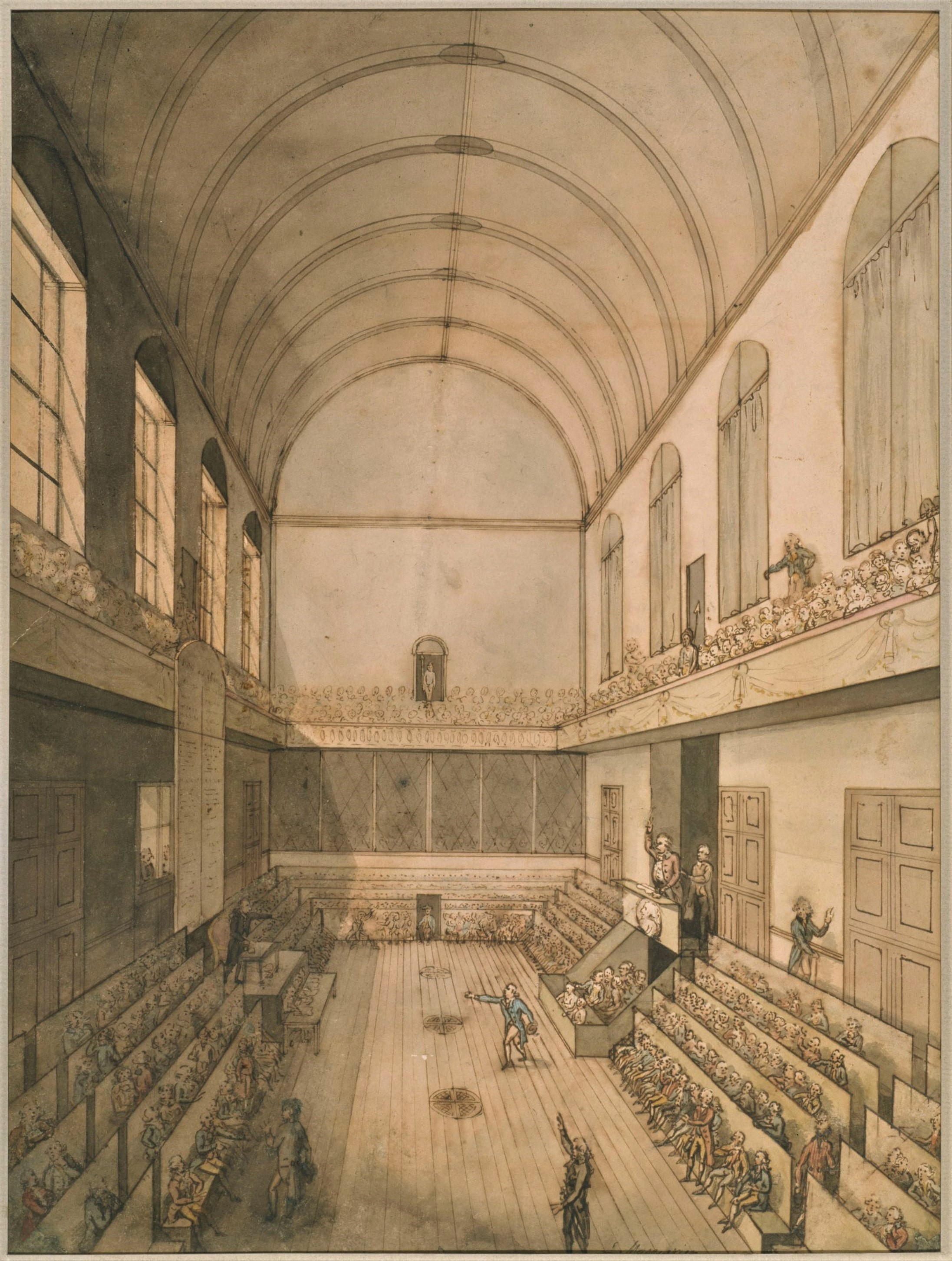
The roll-call votes on the death of Louis XVI were held in the Salle du Manège (image from 1792)

A series of votes were held at the end of the trial of Louis XVI to determine his guilt and the appropriate punishment. After voting on two initial questions on Tuesday 15 January 1793, the députés considered sentencing over 37 uninterrupted hours of debate on Wednesday 16 and Thursday 17 January. Pierre Victurnien Vergniaud was president during these sessions.

== Questions ==
The debate on Monday 14 January was occupied with determining the wording of the resolutions to be voted on.

On Tuesday 15 January 1793, at the National Convention, a roll call vote took place on the first two questions:

- 1 "Is Louis Capet guilty of conspiracy against public liberty and attacks against the general security of the State, yes or no?"
- 2 "Should the judgment of the National Convention against Louis Capet be submitted to the ratification of the people, yes or no?"

The members from each département were called in turn, beginning with the letter G, with each announcing their votes from the podium.

Next, from 10:30 am on Wednesday 16 January until the evening of Thursday 17 January, without interruption, a roll-call vote was conducted on the third question, starting with the département of Haute-Garonne:

- 3 "What punishment should be imposed on Louis?"

It was then that Jean-Baptiste Mailhe, the first to speak, declared:

"As a natural consequence of the opinion that I have already expressed on the first question, I vote for the death of Louis. I will make only one observation. If death has the majority, I think that it would be worthwhile for the National Convention to examine whether it would not be politic and useful to hasten, or to delay, the moment of execution. This proposition is independent of my vote. I return to the first question and I vote for death."

Some members of the Convention complained that there had been irregularity in the voting in the third question. Following a debate, the Convention agreed that there would be a second roll-call vote on the third question, where each member would be asked to confirm their vote. This meant that there were a total of five votes on four substantive questions.

Mailhe's suggestion raised the question of whether, for any reason, the death sentence ought to be stayed. At the session on Saturday 19 January, despite fierce opposition from Jean-Paul Marat, on the motion of fr:René-Pierre Choudieu, the Convention decreed that it would immediately discuss the question of a reprieve, and that the question would be put as follows:

- 4 "Should there be a reprieve of the judgment against Louis Capet?" and that the answer was to be "yes" or "no".

The roll call vote was held in alphabetical order by département, starting with Gers.

== Votes ==
The result of the votes on the four questions were as follows:

=== Summary by département ===
 Ain – Aisne – Allier – Basses-Alpes – Hautes-Alpes – Ardèche – Ardennes – Ariège – Aube – Aude – Aveyron – Bouches-du-Rhône – Calvados – Cantal – Charente – Charente-Inférieure – Cher – Corrèze – Corse – Côte-d'Or – Côtes-du-Nord – Creuse – Dordogne – Doubs – Drôme – Eure – Eure-et-Loir – Finistère – Gard – Haute-Garonne – Gers – Gironde – Hérault – Ille-et-Vilaine – Indre – Indre-et-Loire – Isère – Jura – Landes – Loir-et-Cher – Loire – Haute-Loire – Loire-Inférieure – Loiret – Lot – Lot-et-Garonne –Lozère - Maine-et-Loire – Manche – Marne – Haute-Marne – Mayenne – Meurthe – Meuse – Morbihan – Moselle – Nièvre – Nord – Oise – Orne – Paris – Pas-de-Calais – Puy-de-Dôme – Basses-Pyrénées – Hautes-Pyrénées – Pyrénées-Orientales – Bas-Rhin – Haut-Rhin – Rhône-et-Loire – Haute-Saône – Saône-et-Loire – Sarthe – Seine-Inférieure – Seine-et-Marne – Seine-et-Oise – Deux-Sèvres – Somme – Tarn – Var – Vendée – Vienne – Haute-Vienne – Vosges – Yonne

Députés are listed by département in the order in which they were elected.

=== Ain ===
6 députés and 2 substitutes

Députés	Is Louis Capet guilty of conspiracy against public liberty and attacks against the general security of the State?	Should the judgment of the National Convention against Louis Capet be submitted for ratification by the people?	What punishment should be imposed on Louis?	Should there be a reprieve of the judgment against Louis Capet?
fr:Étienne Deydier	Yes	No	Death	No
fr:Antoine-François Gauthier des Orcières	Yes	No	Death	No
fr:Jean-Baptiste Royer	Yes	Yes	Confinement for the duration of the war and banishment after peace is declared.	Yes
Grégoire Jagot	en mission	en mission	en mission	en mission
fr:Jean Luc Anthelme Mollet	Yes	Yes	Detention, then banishment when the security situation permits.	Yes
fr:Jean-Marie François Merlino	Yes	Yes	Death	No

=== Aisne ===
12 députés and 4 substitutes

Députés	Is Louis Capet guilty of conspiracy against public liberty and attacks against the general security of the State?	Should the judgment of the National Convention against Louis Capet be submitted for ratification by the people?	What punishment should be imposed on Louis?	Should there be a reprieve of the judgment against Louis Capet?
fr:Nicolas-Marie Quinette	Yes	No	Death	No
fr:Jean Antoine Debry	Yes	No, justified	Death	No
fr:Louis Étienne Beffroy	Yes	Yes	Death	No
Louis Antoine Léon de Saint-Just	Yes	No	Death	No
fr:Jean-François Belin	Yes	Yes	Detention until peace is declared, and death if foreign powers seek to restore him.	Yes
fr:Michel Edme Petit	Yes	Yes	Death	No
Nicolas de Condorcet	Yes	No	The severest criminal penalty short of death.	Abstained
fr:Jean-Jacques Fiquet	Yes	Yes	Confinement during the war and deportation after peace is declared.	Yes
fr:Marie Jean François Philibert Le Carlier d'Ardon	Yes	No	Death	No
fr:Pierre Loysel	Yes	Yes	Death with a reprieve until the people accept the new constitution.	Yes
fr:André Dupin de Beaumont	Yes	No	The severest penalty short of death.	No
fr:Augustin Bouchereau	Yes	No	Death with a reprieve to be determined by the Convention.	Yes

=== Allier ===
7 députés and 4 substitutes

Députés	Is Louis Capet guilty of conspiracy against public liberty and attacks against the general security of the State?	Should the judgment of the National Convention against Louis Capet be submitted for ratification by the people?	What punishment should be imposed on Louis?	Should there be a reprieve of the judgment against Louis Capet?
fr:Gilbert Chevalier	Yes	Yes	Abstained	Abstained
fr:Pourçain Martel	Yes	No	Death	No
fr:Claude-Lazare Petitjean	Yes	Abstained	Death	No
fr:Pierre Jacques Forestier	Yes	No	Death	No
fr:Joseph Beauchamp	en mission	en mission	en mission	en mission
fr: Pierre François Félix Joseph Giraud	Yes	No	Death, with a reprieve until the Convention has taken measures to ensure public security.	Sick
fr:Étienne Vidalin	Yes	No	Death	en mission

=== Basses-Alpes ===
6 députés and 2 substitutes

Députés	Is Louis Capet guilty of conspiracy against public liberty and attacks against the general security of the State?	Should the judgment of the National Convention against Louis Capet be submitted for ratification by the people?	What punishment should be imposed on Louis?	Should there be a reprieve of the judgment against Louis Capet?
fr:Jacques Verdollin	Yes	Yes	Imprisonment for the duration of the war and banishment after peace is declared.	Yes
fr:Claude Louis Réguis	Yes	Yes	Detention throughout the war and exile following peace, on pain of death.	Yes
fr:Pierre Jacques Dherbez-Latour	Yes	No	Death	No
fr:Marius Félix Maïsse	Yes	Yes	Death	Sick
Louis François Peyre	Yes	Yes	Death, with the Mailhe amendment.	No
fr:Marc-Antoine Savornin	Yes	No	Death, with the Mailhe amendment.	No

=== Hautes-Alpes ===
5 députés and 4 substitutes

Députés	Is Louis Capet guilty of conspiracy against public liberty and attacks against the general security of the State?	Should the judgment of the National Convention against Louis Capet be submitted for ratification by the people?	What punishment should be imposed on Louis?	Should there be a reprieve of the judgment against Louis Capet?
fr:Pierre Barrety	Yes	Yes	Detention during the war and exile after peace is declared.	Yes
fr:Hyacinthe-Marcelin Borel du Bez	Yes	Yes	Detention during the war and exile after peace is declared.	Yes
fr:Jean-François Izoard	Yes	Abstained, but declared that if the king was condemned to death he would vote "yes".	Detention for the time being, taking such measures as new circumstances might require.	Yes
Jean-Joseph Serres	Yes	Yes	Detention during the war and exile after peace is declared.	Yes
Ignace Caseneuve	As a legislator, yes, but not as a judge.	Yes	Detention during the war and exile after peace is declared.	Yes

=== Ardèche ===
7 députés and 3 substitutes.

Députés	Is Louis Capet guilty of conspiracy against public liberty and attacks against the general security of the State?	Should the judgment of the National Convention against Louis Capet be submitted for ratification by the people?	What punishment should be imposed on Louis?	Should there be a reprieve of the judgment against Louis Capet?
François-Antoine de Boissy d'Anglas	Yes	Yes	Imprisonment in a secure place until peace is declared and the recognition of the French Republic allows the representatives of the nation to order his banishment.	Yes
Hector de Soubeyran de Saint-Prix	Yes	Yes	Death with reprieve until peace is achieved and all the Bourbons expelled.	Yes
François-Joseph Gamon	Yes	Yes, justified	Death with reprieve until enemy countries reappear on the territory of the Republic.	Yes
fr:François-Jérôme Riffard Saint-Martin	Yes	Yes, justified	Confinement until the end of the war, and after the peace, perpetual banishment.	Yes
fr:François-Clément Privat de Garilhe	Yes	Yes	Confinement until peace and the recognition of our new government, then exile outside French territory.	Yes
fr:Claude Gleizal	Yes	No	Death with reprieve until the Convention makes a determination about the fate of the condemned's family.	Yes
fr: Simon Joseph Coren-Fustier	Yes, justified	Yes	Confinement until the Republican government of France is recognised, then perpetual banishment, on pain of death.	Yes

=== Ardennes ===
8 députés and 4 substitutes.

Députés	Is Louis Capet guilty of conspiracy against public liberty and attacks against the general security of the State?	Should the judgment of the National Convention against Louis Capet be submitted for ratification by the people?	What punishment should be imposed on Louis?	Should there be a reprieve of the judgment against Louis Capet?
Edmond Louis Alexis Dubois-Crancé	Yes	No	Death	No
fr:Claude Joseph Ferry	Yes	No	Death	No
fr:Jean-Baptiste Augustin Prosper Mennesson	Yes	Yes	Death with a reprieve until the removal of the Duke of Orléans and his family from the Convention.	Yes
fr: Alexis Joseph Vermon	Yes	Yes	Detention until peace, but death in the event of foreign invasion of the territory of the Republic.	Yes
Michel Robert	Yes	No	Death	Yes
Pierre-Charles-Louis Baudin	Yes	Yes, justified	Confinement throughout the war and deportation after peace.	Yes
fr: Claude Thierriet	Yes	Yes	Perpetual detention.	Yes
fr: Jacques Blondel	Yes	Yes	Detention, on the express condition that he be punished with death if the enemies of the state set foot on the territory of the Republic.	Yes

=== Ariège ===
6 députés and 2 substitutes.

Députés	Is Louis Capet guilty of conspiracy against public liberty and attacks against the general security of the State?	Should the judgment of the National Convention against Louis Capet be submitted for ratification by the people?	What punishment should be imposed on Louis?	Should there be a reprieve of the judgment against Louis Capet?
Marc-Guillaume-Alexis Vadier	Yes	No	Death	No
Jean-Baptiste Clauzel	Yes	No	Death	No
fr:Pierre Campmartin	Yes	No	Death	No
fr:Jean Espert	Yes	No	Death	No
Joseph Lakanal	Yes	No	Death	No
fr:Raymond Gaston	Yes	No	Death	No

=== Aube ===
9 députés and 3 substitutes.

Députés	Is Louis Capet guilty of conspiracy against public liberty and attacks against the general security of the State?	Should the judgment of the National Convention against Louis Capet be submitted for ratification by the people?	What punishment should be imposed on Louis?	Should there be a reprieve of the judgment against Louis Capet?
Edme-Bonaventure Courtois	Yes	No	Death	No
fr:Louis Antoine Joseph Robin	Yes	No	Death	No
fr:Pierre Nicolas Perrin	Yes	Yes	Detention until peace and banishment at that time.	Yes
fr: Claude Duval de Fraville	Yes	No	Detention during the war and banishment after peace.	Yes
fr:Jean Thomas Bonnemain	Yes	Yes	Detention during the war and banishment after peace.	Yes
fr: Joseph Nicolas Pierret	Yes	Yes	Detention during the war and banishment after peace.	Yes
fr: Jean-Claude Douge	Yes	Yes	Detention during the war and banishment after peace.	Yes
Antoine Marie Charles Garnier	Yes	No	Death	No
Jean-Paul Rabaut de Saint-Étienne	Yes	Yes	Detention during the war and banishment after peace.	Yes

=== Aude ===
8 députés and 3 substitutes.

Députés	Is Louis Capet guilty of conspiracy against public liberty and attacks against the general security of the State?	Should the judgment of the National Convention against Louis Capet be submitted for ratification by the people?	What punishment should be imposed on Louis?	Should there be a reprieve of the judgment against Louis Capet?
fr:Michel Azéma	Yes	No	Death	No
fr:Pierre François Bonnet	Yes	No	Death	No
fr:Dominique-Vincent Ramel-Nogaret	Yes	Yes, justified	Death	No
fr:Jean-Laurent-Germain Tournier	Yes	Yes	Confinement throughout the war and banishment after peace.	Yes
fr:Jean-Baptiste Marragon	Yes	Yes	Death	No
fr:François Antoine Morin	Yes	Yes	Detention throughout the war and banishment after peace, unless exceptional measures are necessary, including pain of death if an invasion of French territory takes place.	Yes
fr:Jacques Périès	Yes	Yes	Confinement of Louis and his family thoroughly the war and banishment for all of them after peace.	Yes
fr:Antoine Marie Girard	Yes	Yes	Death	Yes

=== Aveyron ===
9 députés and 3 substitutes.

Députés	Is Louis Capet guilty of conspiracy against public liberty and attacks against the general security of the State?	Should the judgment of the National Convention against Louis Capet be submitted for ratification by the people?	What punishment should be imposed on Louis?	Should there be a reprieve of the judgment against Louis Capet?
fr:Jean-Baptiste Bô	Yes	No	Death	No
fr:Charles Saint-Martin-Valogne	Yes	Yes	Confinement throughout the war and banishment after peace.	Yes
fr:Louis Lobinhès	Yes, as a legislator, but have no wish to act as a judge.	Yes	Detention throughout the war and exile after peace.	Yes
fr:Louis Bernard de Saint-Affrique	Yes	No	Imprisonment throughout the war and banishment thereafter, when the Assembly thinks it appropriate.	Yes
fr:Simon Camboulas	Yes	No	Death	No
fr:Jean-Louis Second	Yes	No	Death	No
fr:Joseph-Henri Lacombe	Yes	No	Death with the Mailhe amendment.	No
fr:Louis Louchet	Yes	No	Death	No
fr:Xavier Godefroy d'Yzarn de Freissinet de Valady	Abstained	Yes	Imprisonment of Louis, his wife and children in the château de Saumur, where they should be guarded as hostages until Francis of Austria recognises the sovereignty of the French Republic and the independence of the Belgians.	Yes

=== Bouches-du-Rhône ===
12 députés and 7 substitutes.

Députés	Is Louis Capet guilty of conspiracy against public liberty and attacks against the general security of the State?	Should the judgment of the National Convention against Louis Capet be submitted for ratification by the people?	What punishment should be imposed on Louis?	Should there be a reprieve of the judgment against Louis Capet?
Jean Duprat	Yes	Yes	Death	No
François Rebecqui	Yes	Yes	Death	No
Charles Jean Marie Barbaroux	Yes	Yes	Death	Yes
fr:François Omer Granet	Yes	No	Death	No
fr:Pierre-Toussaint Durand de Maillane	Yes, justified	Yes, justified	Detention until peace, then banishment on pain of death.	Sick
Thomas-Augustin de Gasparin	Yes	No	Death	No
Moyse Bayle	Yes	No	Death	No
fr:Pierre Marie Baille	Yes	No	Death	No
Stanislas Joseph François Xavier Rovère	Yes	No	Death	No
fr:Claude Romain Lauze de Perret	Yes	Yes	Confinement throughout the war and banishment after peace in pain of death.	Yes
fr:Denis-Marie Pellissier	Yes	No	Death	No
fr:Bernard Laurens	Yes	No	Death	No

=== Calvados ===
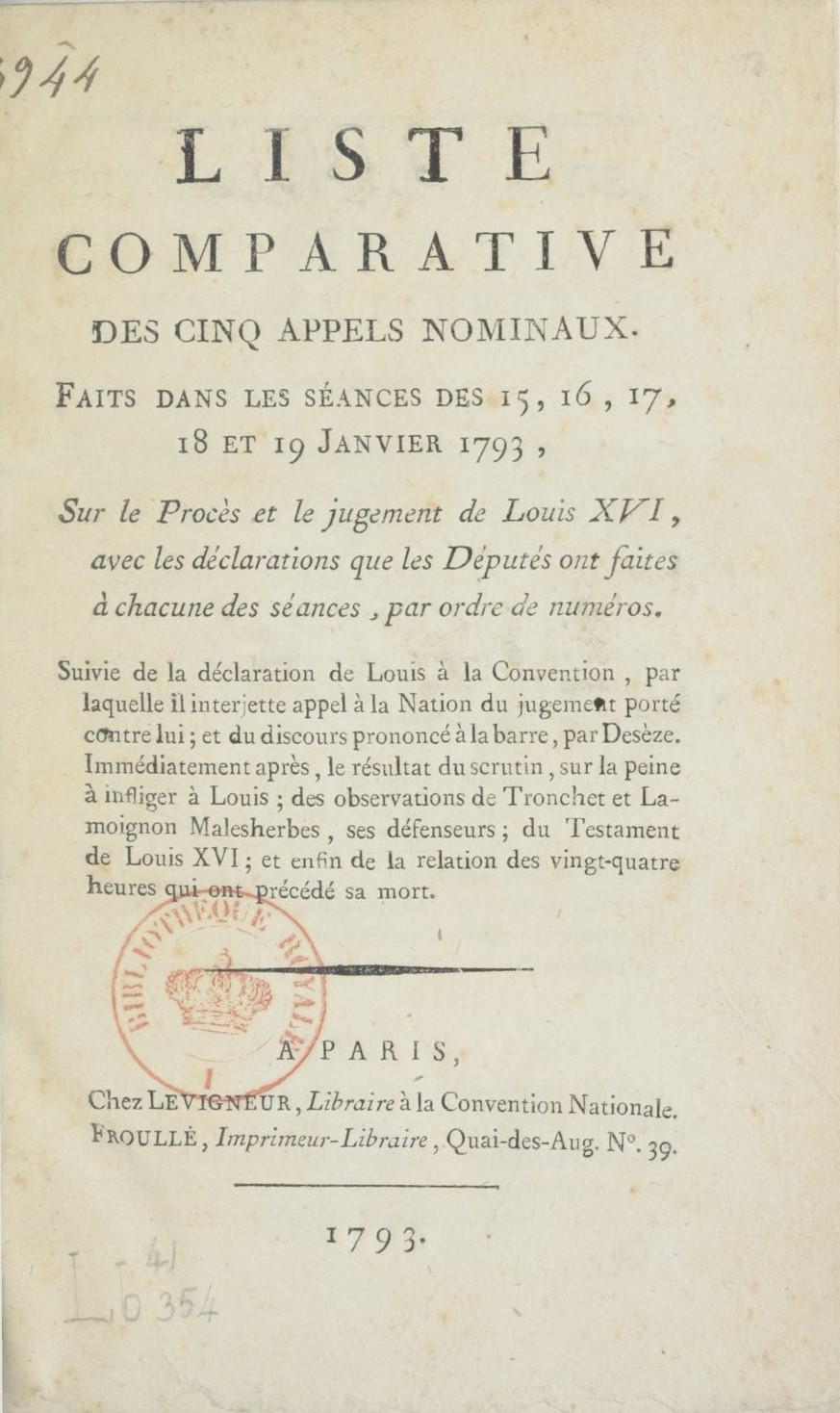
Liste comparative des cinq appels nominaux by J-F. Froullé et T. Levigneur (contemporary publication listing the results of the roll-call votes)

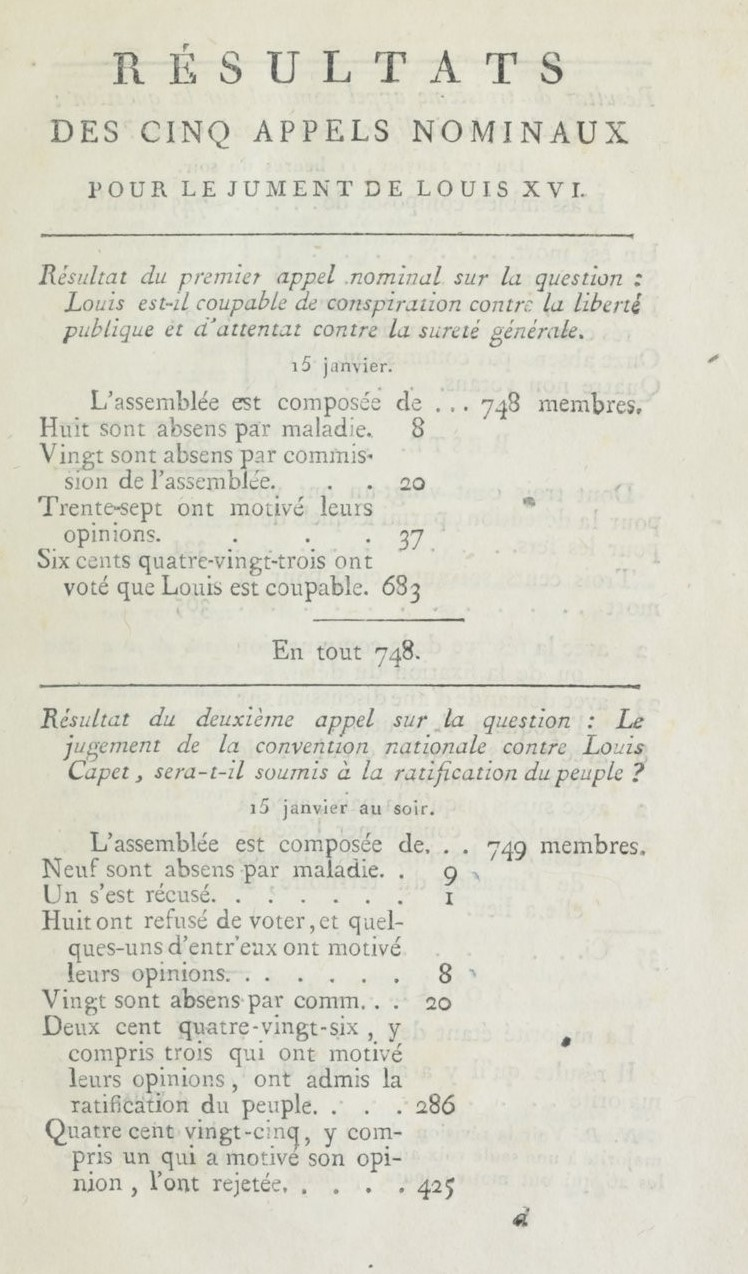
Liste comparative des cinq appels nominaux, page 25

13 députés and 5 substitutes

Députés	Is Louis Capet guilty of conspiracy against public liberty and attacks against the general security of the State?	Should the judgment of the National Convention against Louis Capet be submitted for ratification by the people?	What punishment should be imposed on Louis?	Should there be a reprieve of the judgment against Louis Capet?
Claude Fauchet	Yes, as citizen and legislator. As a judge I have no standing, and I make no pronouncement.	Yes, justified	Confinement during the war and banishment after peace.	Yes
fr:Louis Dubois du Bais	Yes, justified	Yes	Death with reprieve until the foreign powers set foot on our territory, or until others join them in making war on us.	Yes
fr:Jean-Baptiste Lomont	Abstained and justified his position.	Yes	Confinement during the war and deportation after peace.	Yes
Pierre Henry-Larivière	Abstained and justified his position.	Yes	Detention during the war and exile after peace.	Yes
fr:Pierre-Louis Bonnet de Mautry	Yes	No	Death with the Mailhe amendment.	No
fr:Louis-Alexandre-Jacques Vardon	Yes	Yes	Detention until foreign nations recognise the independence of the Republic and the sovereignty of the French people, and exile after peace.	Yes
Doulcet de Pontécoulant	Yes, justified	No	Provisional detention and expulsion after peace.	Yes
fr:Jacques Taveau	Yes, justified	Yes	Death with a reprieve until our enemies attempt to invade our territory or until the adoption of the constitution.	Yes
fr:Thomas Jouenne-Longchamp	Yes	Yes	Death with a reprieve until such time as the Convention decides it should take place.	No
fr:Louis-Philippe Dumont	Yes, justified	Yes	Confinement throughout the war and perpetual banishment once the republican government is solidly established.	Yes
fr:Gabriel de Cussy	Yes	Yes	Confinement throughout the war and banishment after peace.	Yes
fr:Alexandre Legot	Yes	Yes	Confinement throughout the war and banishment after peace.	Yes
fr:Jean-François Philippe-Delleville	Yes	Yes	Confinement throughout the war and banishment after peace.	Yes

=== Cantal ===
8 députés and 3 substitutes

Députés	Is Louis Capet guilty of conspiracy against public liberty and attacks against the general security of the State?	Should the judgment of the National Convention against Louis Capet be submitted for ratification by the people?	What punishment should be imposed on Louis?	Should there be a reprieve of the judgment against Louis Capet?
Anne-Alexandre-Marie Thibault	Yes	Yes, justified	Confinement during the war and, after peace, expulsion of Louis, his family and all the Bourbons.	Yes
Édouard Jean Baptiste Milhaud	Yes	No	Death	No
fr: Jacques Méjansac	Yes	Yes	Confinement throughout the war and banishment after peace.	Sick
Jean-Baptiste Lacoste	Yes	No, justified	Death	No
Jean-Baptiste Carrier	Yes	No	Death	No
Joseph Mailhes (*)	Absent	Absent	Absent	Absent
fr:Antoine Dominique Chabanon	Yes	Yes	Detention until peace, then perpetual banishment.	Yes
fr: Guillaume Peuvergne	Yes	Yes	Confinement throughout the war and banishment after peace.	Yes

(*-In late 1792 Joseph Mailhes declared himself unable to accept the position of député owing to illness, and resigned. On 13 December 1792 the General Council of the Cantal department appointed fr:Jean-Pierre Malhes to replace him. Malhes had been elected as the first substitute member in the elections to the Convention in September 1792. Malhes arrived in Paris on 17 January 17, 1793 and was promptly admitted to the Convention as Mailhes' replacement. However, as neither Mailhes nor Malhes was able to participate in the roll call votes, it is Mailhes' name that appears in the register for those votes, followed by the words "absent due to illness" and "absent without cause").

=== Charente ===
9 députés and 4 substitutes

Députés	Is Louis Capet guilty of conspiracy against public liberty and attacks against the general security of the State?	Should the judgment of the National Convention against Louis Capet be submitted for ratification by the people?	What punishment should be imposed on Louis?	Should there be a reprieve of the judgment against Louis Capet?
fr:Antoine Dubois de Bellegarde	Yes	No	Death	No
fr:Jean Guimberteau	Yes	No	Death	No
fr:Jean-François Simon Chazaud	Yes	No	Death	No
fr:Augustin Chedaneau	Yes	No	Death with the Mailhe amendment.	Yes
fr:Jean-Pierre Ribéreau	Yes	Yes	Death	No
fr:Jean-Baptiste Devars	Yes	Yes	Detention followed by banishment.	Yes
Jean Brun	Yes	No	Death	No
fr: Jacques Crevelier	Yes	No	Death	No
fr:Pierre-Jacques Maulde de Loisellerie	Yes	Yes	Perpetual detention, unless exceptional measures are required when the constitution is presented for popular approval or after the end of the war.	Yes

=== Charente-Inférieure ===
11 députés and 4 substitutes

Députés	Is Louis Capet guilty of conspiracy against public liberty and attacks against the general security of the State?	Should the judgment of the National Convention against Louis Capet be submitted for ratification by the people?	What punishment should be imposed on Louis?	Should there be a reprieve of the judgment against Louis Capet?
André Antoine Bernard	Yes, justified	No	Death	No
Jean-Jacques Bréard	Yes	No	Death	No
Joseph Eschassériaux	Yes	No	Death	No
Joseph Niou	Yes	No	Death	No
fr:Pierre-Charles Ruamps	Yes	No	Death	No
Jacques Garnier	Yes, justified	No, justified	Death	No
fr: Gustave Dechézeaux	Yes	No	Detention until circumstances allow this to be replaced by banishment.	No
fr:Paul Augustin Lozeau	Yes	No, justified	Death	No
fr: Marc Antoine Alexis Giraud	Yes	No	Detention during the war and banishment after peace.	Yes
fr: Pierre Étienne Vinet	Yes	No	Death	No
fr: Jacques Sébastien Dautriche	Yes	Yes	Detention until peace, after which the Convention or the legislature will take the measures it judges appropriate.	Yes

=== Cher ===
6 députés and 2 substitutes

Députés	Is Louis Capet guilty of conspiracy against public liberty and attacks against the general security of the State?	Should the judgment of the National Convention against Louis Capet be submitted for ratification by the people?	What punishment should be imposed on Louis?	Should there be a reprieve of the judgment against Louis Capet?
fr:Pierre Allasœur	Yes	Yes	Imprisonment until peace, then banishment.	Yes
fr:Jacques Foucher	Yes	Yes	Death	en mission
fr:François Baucheton	Yes	Yes	Detention during the war and banishment after peace.	Yes
fr:Charles-Benoît Fauvre-Labrunerie	Yes	No	Death	No
fr:Élie-François Dugenne	Yes	Yes	Detention during the war and banishment after peace.	Yes
Jacques Pelletier	Yes	Yes	Death	Yes

=== Corrèze ===
7 députés and 3 substitutes

Députés	Is Louis Capet guilty of conspiracy against public liberty and attacks against the general security of the State?	Should the judgment of the National Convention against Louis Capet be submitted for ratification by the people?	What punishment should be imposed on Louis?	Should there be a reprieve of the judgment against Louis Capet?
Jacques Brival	Yes	No	Death	No
fr:Borie	Yes	No	Death	No
fr: Bigorie du Chambon	Yes, justified	Yes	Death	Abstained
fr:Bernard-François Lidon	Yes	Yes	Death with the Mailhe amendment.	No
fr:Antoine-Joseph Lanot	Yes	No	Death	No
fr:Jean-Augustin Pénières	Yes	No	Death	No
fr: Pierre Raymond Lafon de Beaulieu	Abstained and justified his decision.	Abstained	Recused himself.	Abstained

=== Corse ===
6 députés and 2 substitutes

Députés	Is Louis Capet guilty of conspiracy against public liberty and attacks against the general security of the State?	Should the judgment of the National Convention against Louis Capet be submitted for ratification by the people?	What punishment should be imposed on Louis?	Should there be a reprieve of the judgment against Louis Capet?
Christophe Saliceti	Yes, as a citizen, and not as a judge.	No	Death	No
fr:Ange Chiappe	Yes, justified	Yes	Detention during the war and deportation afterwards.	Sick
fr:Luc-Julien-Joseph Casabianca	Yes	No	Detention, apart from any measures the Convention might take depending on circumstances.	Yes
fr:Antoine Andrei	Yes	Yes	Confinement for as long as necessary for the salvation of the country.	Yes
fr:Jean-Baptiste Bozi	Yes	Yes	Confinement until peace, then banishment.	Absent
fr:Jean André Moltedo	Yes	No	Detention during the war.	Sick

=== Côte-d'Or ===
10 députés and 4 substitutes

Députés	Is Louis Capet guilty of conspiracy against public liberty and attacks against the general security of the State?	Should the judgment of the National Convention against Louis Capet be submitted for ratification by the people?	What punishment should be imposed on Louis?	Should there be a reprieve of the judgment against Louis Capet?
Claude Basire	Yes	No	Death	No
Louis-Bernard Guyton-Morveau	Yes	No, justified	Death	No
Claude-Antoine Prieur-Duvernois	Yes	No	Death	No
fr:Charles-François Oudot	Yes	No	Death	No
fr:Florent-Guiot	Yes	No	Death	No
Charles Lambert de Belan	Yes	Yes, justified	Imprisonment throughout the war and deportation after peace, so long as the people do not grant future legislatures the power to determine his fate otherwise.	Sick
fr:Nicolas-Joseph Marey	Yes	Yes	Detention throughout the war and expulsion one year after the tyrants have laid down their weapons and recognised the Republic.	Yes
fr:Narcisse Trullard	Yes	No	Death	No
fr:Juste Rameau de La Cérée	Yes, justified	No	Immediate and perpetual banishment without prejudice to any measures to be taken against family.	Yes
fr:Théophile Berlier	Yes	No	Death	No

=== Côtes-du-Nord ===
8 députés and 3 substitutes

Députés	Is Louis Capet guilty of conspiracy against public liberty and attacks against the general security of the State?	Should the judgment of the National Convention against Louis Capet be submitted for ratification by the people?	What punishment should be imposed on Louis?	Should there be a reprieve of the judgment against Louis Capet?
fr:Gabriel Hyacinthe Couppé	Yes	No	Confinement during the war and banishment after peace.	Yes
fr:Julien-François Palasne de Champeaux	Yes	Yes	Detention during the war, as a hostage, and expulsion after peace, on pain of death.	Yes
fr: René Claude Gaultier	Yes	No	Perpetual detention.	Yes
fr:Pierre Guyomar	Yes	Yes	Provisional detention during the war and banishment after peace.	Yes
fr:Honoré-Marie Fleury	Yes	Yes	Detention during the war and banishment after peace.	Yes
fr:Claude-Joseph Girault	Yes	Yes	Detention during the war and banishment after peace.	Yes
fr: René-Charles Loncle des Aleux	Yes	No	Death	No
fr: Guillaume Julien Pierre Goudelin	Yes	Yes	Confinement until the end of dangers to the homeland will allow him and his family to be banished, or until a new invasion of our land obliges the Convention to take his head on the scaffold, according to the demand of the people.	Yes

=== Creuse ===
7 députés and 3 substitutes

Députés	Is Louis Capet guilty of conspiracy against public liberty and attacks against the general security of the State?	Should the judgment of the National Convention against Louis Capet be submitted for ratification by the people?	What punishment should be imposed on Louis?	Should there be a reprieve of the judgment against Louis Capet?
fr:Marc-Antoine Huguet	Yes	Yes	Death with the Mailhe amendment.	No
fr:Jean Debourges	Yes/recused himself (sources vary)	Yes	Abstained	Abstained
fr:Jean-Baptiste Coutisson-Dumas	Yes, as a statesman and not as a judge.	Yes	Confinement until the Constitution is adopted, and a law is passed specifically concerning the fate of the tyrant.	Yes
fr:Jean-François Guyès	Yes	Yes	Death	No
fr:Louis Jorrand	Yes	Yes	Detention during the war, then banishment one year after peace.	No
fr:Jean-François Barailon	Recused himself and justified his position.	Sick	Detention, until some other measure may be required for public safety.	Yes
fr:Léonard-Michel Texier-Mortegoute	Yes	Yes	Detention.	No

=== Dordogne ===
10 députés and 3 substitutes

Députés	Is Louis Capet guilty of conspiracy against public liberty and attacks against the general security of the State?	Should the judgment of the National Convention against Louis Capet be submitted for ratification by the people?	What punishment should be imposed on Louis?	Should there be a reprieve of the judgment against Louis Capet?
fr:François Lamarque	Not included in the roll call	No	Death	No
fr: Jacques Pinet	Not included in the roll call	No, justified	Death	No
Élie Lacoste	Not included in the roll call	No	Death	No
fr:Pierre Roux-Fazillac	Yes	No	Death	No
fr:Jean Guillaume Taillefer	Yes	No	Death	No
fr:Jean-Pascal Charles de Peyssard	Yes	No	Death	No
fr: Étienne Cambort-Borie	Yes	No	Death	Sick
fr:Jean Allafort	Yes	Yes	Death	No
fr: François Meynard	Made a declaration, but did not answer the question.	Yes	Detention throughout the war, until after peace determining whether exceptional measures ought to be taken for the tranquility and safety of the Republic.	Yes
fr: Gabriel Bouquier	Yes	No	Death	No

=== Doubs ===
6 députés and 2 substitutes

Députés	Is Louis Capet guilty of conspiracy against public liberty and attacks against the general security of the State?	Should the judgment of the National Convention against Louis Capet be submitted for ratification by the people?	What punishment should be imposed on Louis?	Should there be a reprieve of the judgment against Louis Capet?
fr:Jean-Baptiste Quirot	Yes	No	Confinement during the war and banishment after peace.	No
fr: Jean-Baptiste Michaud	Yes	No	Death	No
fr:Philippe Charles François Seguin	Yes	Yes	Confinement during the war and banishment after the re-establishment of peace.	Yes
fr:Jacques Monnot	Yes	No	Death	No
fr: Charles-Baptiste-François Vernerey	Yes	No	Death	No
fr: Alexandre Besson	Yes	No, justified	Death	No

=== Drôme ===
9 députés and 3 substitutes

Députés	Is Louis Capet guilty of conspiracy against public liberty and attacks against the general security of the State?	Should the judgment of the National Convention against Louis Capet be submitted for ratification by the people?	What punishment should be imposed on Louis?	Should there be a reprieve of the judgment against Louis Capet?
Marc Antoine Jullien	Yes, justified	No	Death	No
fr:Pierre-Barthélemy Sauteyra	Yes	Yes	Death	No
fr:Joseph Fiacre Olivier de Gérente	Yes	Yes	Detention during the war and deportation after peace.	Yes
fr: François Marbos	Yes	Yes	Detention.	Yes
fr:Joseph Antoine Boisset	Yes	Yes	Death	No
fr:Jacques-Bernardin Colaud de La Salcette	Yes	Yes	Confinement until peace, then banishment, but on pain of death if enemies invade the territory of the Republic.	Yes
fr: Jean Jacques Jacomin	Yes	No	Death	No
fr:Jean Raymond Fayolle	Yes	No	Detention during the war and banishment after peace.	Yes
fr: Jean-Marie Martinel de Visan	Yes	Yes	Detention during the war and banishment after peace.	Yes

=== Eure ===
11 députés and 4 substitutes

Députés	Is Louis Capet guilty of conspiracy against public liberty and attacks against the general security of the State?	Should the judgment of the National Convention against Louis Capet be submitted for ratification by the people?	What punishment should be imposed on Louis?	Should there be a reprieve of the judgment against Louis Capet?
François Buzot	Yes	Yes	Death with the Mailhe amendment.	Yes
fr:Thomas Lindet	Yes	No	Death	No
Jean-Baptiste Robert Lindet	Yes	No	Death	No
Jean-Michel Duroy	Yes	No	Death	No
Richou	Yes	Yes	Detention during the war and banishment after peace.	Yes
fr:Denis Le Maréchal	Yes, justified	Yes	Placed in a safe location with his family until peace is concluded, then deportation.	Yes
fr:Jean-Nicolas Topsent	Sick	Sick	Sick	Sick
fr:Alexis-Joseph Bouillerot-Demarsenne	Yes	No	Death	No
fr:Jacques Nicolas Vallée	Yes	Abstained	Detention until the Republican government is recognised, then expulsion outside the territory of the Republic, except if enemy armies enter French territory, in which case, death.	Yes
fr:Louis-Jacques Savary	Yes	Yes	Placed in a safe location with his family until peace is concluded, then deportation.	Yes
fr:Charles-François Dubusc	Made a declaration but did not answer the question.	Yes	Detention, then expulsion when public safety requires it.	Yes

=== Eure-et-Loir ===
9 députés and 4 substitutes

Députés	Is Louis Capet guilty of conspiracy against public liberty and attacks against the general security of the State?	Should the judgment of the National Convention against Louis Capet be submitted for ratification by the people?	What punishment should be imposed on Louis?	Should there be a reprieve of the judgment against Louis Capet?
Jean-François Delacroix	en mission	en mission	Death	No
Jacques Pierre Brissot	Yes	Yes	Death with a reprieve until after the ratification of the Constitution by the people.	Yes
Jérôme Pétion de Villeneuve	Yes	Yes	Death with the Mailhe amendment.	Yes
fr:Jacques Charles Giroust	Abstained and justified his decision.	Yes	Confinement.	Yes
Denis Toussaint Lesage	Yes	Yes	Death with the Mailhe amendment.	Yes
fr:Jean-François Loiseau	Yes	No	Death	No
fr: Nicolas Bourgeois	Yes, as a citizen and not as a legislator.	Yes, justified	Sick	Sick
fr:Pierre Jacques Chasles	Yes	No, justified	Death	No
fr: Jacques Frémanger	Yes	No	Death	No

=== Finistère ===
8 députés and 3 substitutes

Députés	Is Louis Capet guilty of conspiracy against public liberty and attacks against the general security of the State?	Should the judgment of the National Convention against Louis Capet be submitted for ratification by the people?	What punishment should be imposed on Louis?	Should there be a reprieve of the judgment against Louis Capet?
fr:Alain Bohan	Yes	Yes	Death	Yes
Claude-Antoine-Auguste Blad	Yes	Yes	Death with a reprieve until the expulsion of his entire family.	No
fr:Mathieu Guezno	Yes	No	Death	No
Pierre Marec	Yes	Yes, justified	Confinement during the war and perpetual exile afterwards.	No
Jacques Queinnec	Yes	Yes	Detention during the war and banishment after peace.	Yes
fr:Augustin Bernard-François Le Goazre de Kervelegan	Yes	Yes	Detention during the war and banishment after peace.	Yes
fr:Jacques Tanguy Marie Guermeur	Yes	No	Death	No
fr:Jean-René Gomaire	Yes	Yes	Confinement during the war and banishment after peace.	Yes

=== Gard ===
8 députés and 3 substitutes

Députés	Is Louis Capet guilty of conspiracy against public liberty and attacks against the general security of the State?	Should the judgment of the National Convention against Louis Capet be submitted for ratification by the people?	What punishment should be imposed on Louis?	Should there be a reprieve of the judgment against Louis Capet?
fr:Jacques-Augustin Leyris	Yes	No	Death	No
Jean-Henri Voulland	Yes	No	Death	No
fr:Jacques Jac	Yes	Yes	Death with a reprieve until the acceptance of the Constitution by the people.	Yes
François Aubry	Yes	Yes, justified	Death with a reprieve until after the primary assembles have been held to ratify the Constitution.	Yes
fr:Joseph-François Balla	Yes	Yes	Confinement during the war and banishment after peace when public safety will allow it.	Yes
Jacques Antoine Rabaut-Pommier	Yes	Yes, justified	Death with a reprieve until after the ratification of the constitutional decrees.	Yes
Jean-Pierre Chazal	Yes	Yes, justified	Death with the Mailhe amendment.	Yes
fr:Antoine Berthezène	Yes	Yes	Death with a reprieve until after the primary assemblies have been held or the Constitution has been presented for popular approval.	Yes

=== Haute-Garonne ===
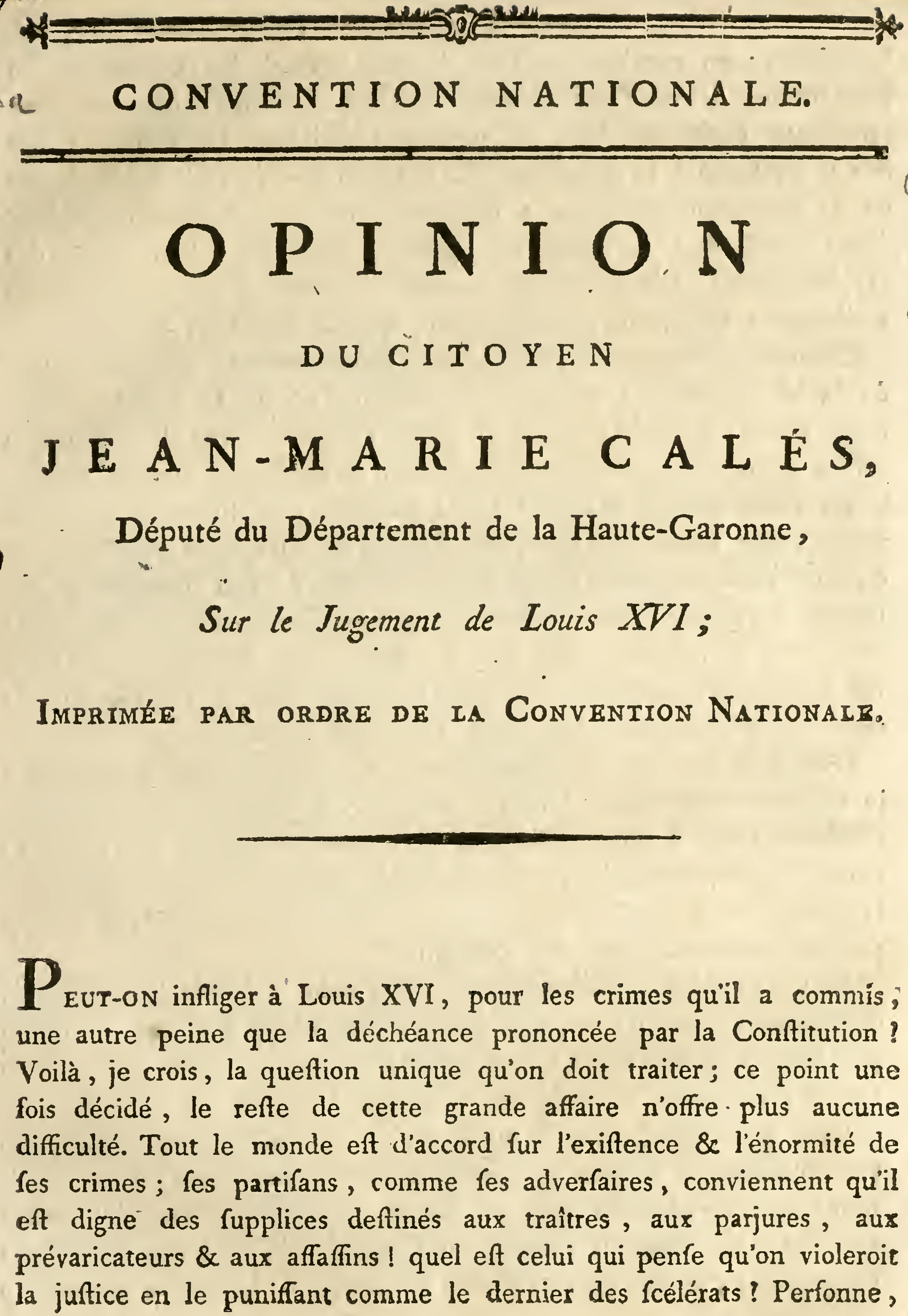
Speech by Jean-Marie Calès, député from Haute-Garonne, on the punishment of Louis XVI

12 députés and 4 substitutes

Députés	Is Louis Capet guilty of conspiracy against public liberty and attacks against the general security of the State?	Should the judgment of the National Convention against Louis Capet be submitted for ratification by the people?	What punishment should be imposed on Louis?	Should there be a reprieve of the judgment against Louis Capet?
Jean-Baptiste Mailhe	Yes	No	Death, with further debate regarding postponement.	Yes
Jean-François-Bertrand Delmas	Yes	No	Death	No
fr:Joseph-Étienne Projean	Yes	No	Death	No
fr:Emmanuel Pérès de Lagesse	Yes	Yes	Confinement until peace, then banishment.	Yes
Jean Julien	Yes	No	Death	No
Jean-Marie Calès	Yes	No	Death	No
fr:Antoine Estadens	Yes	Yes	Confinement until peace, then banishment.	Yes
fr:Louis-Bernard Aÿral	Yes	Yes	Death	No
fr:Claude-Louis-Michel de Sacy	Yes	No	Death with the Mailhe amendment.	No
Jacques-Marie Rouzet	Made a declaration but did not answer the question.	Yes	Prison sentence.	Yes
fr:Philippe Drulhe	Yes	Yes	Banishment on pain of death if Louis returns to France.	Yes
fr:Julien-Bernard-Dorothée Mazade-Percin	Yes	Yes	Perpetual confinement.	Yes

=== Gers ===
9 députés and 3 substitutes

Députés	Is Louis Capet guilty of conspiracy against public liberty and attacks against the general security of the State?	Should the judgment of the National Convention against Louis Capet be submitted for ratification by the people?	What punishment should be imposed on Louis?	Should there be a reprieve of the judgment against Louis Capet?
fr:Antoine Louis La Plaigne	Yes	No	Death	No
fr:Louis Bon de Montaut	Yes	No	Death	No
Bernard Descamps	Yes	No	Death	No
fr:Joseph Capin	Yes	Yes, justified	Confinement until the consolidation of liberty, then banishment.	Yes
Barbeau du Barran	Yes	No	Death	No
fr: Joseph Laguire	Yes	No	Death	No
fr: Pierre Ichon	Yes	No, justified	Death	No
Francois Bousquet	Yes	No	Death	No
fr:Jean Moysset	Yes	Yes	Confinement until peace, then banishment.	Yes

=== Gironde ===
12 députés and 6 substitutes

Députés	Is Louis Capet guilty of conspiracy against public liberty and attacks against the general security of the State?	Should the judgment of the National Convention against Louis Capet be submitted for ratification by the people?	What punishment should be imposed on Louis?	Should there be a reprieve of the judgment against Louis Capet?
Pierre Victurnien Vergniaud	Yes	Yes	Death with the Mailhe amendment.	No
Élie Guadet	Yes	Yes	Death with the Mailhe amendment.	Yes
fr:Armand Gensonné	Yes	Yes	Death	No
fr:Jean-Antoine Grangeneuve	Yes	Yes	Detention.	Abstained
fr: Jean Jay	Yes	No	Death	No
Jean-François Ducos	Yes	No	Death	No
Pierre-Anselme Garrau	Yes	No	Death	No
Jean-Baptiste Boyer-Fonfrède	Yes	No	Death	No
Alexandre Deleyre	Yes	No, justified	Death	No
fr:Jacques Paul Fronton Duplantier	Yes	No	Death with the Mailhe amendment.	No
Jacques Lacaze	Yes	No	Confinement until peace, and until the foreign powers recognise the Republic, after which, banishment.	Sick
fr:François Bergoeing	Yes	Yes	Confinement.	Yes

=== Hérault ===
9 députés and 3 substitutes

Députés	Is Louis Capet guilty of conspiracy against public liberty and attacks against the general security of the State?	Should the judgment of the National Convention against Louis Capet be submitted for ratification by the people?	What punishment should be imposed on Louis?	Should there be a reprieve of the judgment against Louis Capet?
Pierre Joseph Cambon	Yes	No	Death	No
Ange-Élisabeth-Louis-Antoine Bonnier	Yes	No	Death	No
fr:Jean-François Curée	Yes	No	Confinement during the war and deportation after peace.	Yes
Jacques Joseph Viennet	Yes	Yes, justified	Confinement until peace or until the European powers recognise the independence of the Republic; thereafter banishment on pain of death.	Yes
fr:Jean-Pascal Rouyer	Yes	Yes	Death	No
Jean-Jacques-Régis de Cambacérès	Yes	No	Punishment established against conspirators but suspension of the decree and confinement until the cessation of hostilities, at which time the fate of Louis should be finally determined, however immediate execution of the decree in the event of invasion of French territory.	Yes
fr: Ignace Brunel	Yes	Yes	Detention in perpetuity, or deportation according to the circumstances.	Yes
fr:Claude Dominique Côme Fabre	Yes	No, justified	Death	No
fr:Pierre Castilhon	Yes	Yes	Confinement and banishment after peace.	Yes

=== Ille-et-Vilaine ===
10 députés and 5 substitutes

Députés	Is Louis Capet guilty of conspiracy against public liberty and attacks against the general security of the State?	Should the judgment of the National Convention against Louis Capet be submitted for ratification by the people?	What punishment should be imposed on Louis?	Should there be a reprieve of the judgment against Louis Capet?
fr:Jean-Denis Lanjuinais	Yes, without being tried.	Yes	Confinement until peace and banishment afterwards, on pain of death if he returns to France.	Yes
fr:Jacques Defermon	Yes	Yes	Confinement.	Yes
fr:Charles François Marie Duval	Yes	No	Death	No
fr:Joseph Marie François Sevestre	Yes	No	Death	No
fr: Jean-François Chaumont	Yes	No	Death	No
fr: Roch Pierre François Lebreton	Yes	No	Perpetual confinement.	No
fr: François-Marie Jan du Bignon	Yes	No	Detention until the forthcoming primary assemblies, which may confirm or commute the punishment.	No
fr:Mathurin Jean François Obelin-Kergal	Yes	Yes	Confinement during the war and deportation after peace.	Yes
fr: Pierre Jean-Baptiste Beaugeard	Yes	No	Death	No
fr: Jean-François Maurel	Yes	No	Detention until peace and the consolidation of the Republic, followed by banishment.	Yes

=== Indre ===
6 députés and 2 substitutes

Députés	Is Louis Capet guilty of conspiracy against public liberty and attacks against the general security of the State?	Should the judgment of the National Convention against Louis Capet be submitted for ratification by the people?	What punishment should be imposed on Louis?	Should there be a reprieve of the judgment against Louis Capet?
fr:Gilles Porcher de Lissonay	Yes	Yes	Detention until peace and stability of the government, allowing him to be banned forever from the territory of the Republic.	Yes
fr:Guillaume Thabaud de Bois-La-Reine	Yes	No	Death with the Mailhe amendment.	No
fr:Sylvain Pépin	Yes	Yes, justified	Detention until the end of the war; deportation after peace.	No
fr:Jacques-Antoine Boudin	Yes	Yes	Imprisonment until the end of the war, then deportation after peace.	Yes
fr:Sylvain-Phalier Lejeune	Yes	No	Death	No
fr:Jean Joseph Eustache Derazey	Yes	Yes	Confinement, then deportation when circumstances permit.	Yes

=== Indre-et-Loire ===
8 députés and 3 substitutes

Députés	Is Louis Capet guilty of conspiracy against public liberty and attacks against the general security of the State?	Should the judgment of the National Convention against Louis Capet be submitted for ratification by the people?	What punishment should be imposed on Louis?	Should there be a reprieve of the judgment against Louis Capet?
fr:Pierre-Claude Nioche	Yes	No, justified	Death	No
fr:Jacques Louis Dupont	Yes	No	Death	No
fr:Charles-Albert Pottier	Yes	No, justified	Death	No
fr:Jean-François Martin Gardien	Yes	Yes	Detention until peace, then deportation.	Yes
fr:Albert Ruelle	Yes	No	Death with the Mailhe amendment.	No
fr:René-Jean Champigny-Clément	Yes	No	Death	No
Claude-Alexandre Ysabeau	Yes	No	Death	No
fr:Pierre Joseph François Bodin	Yes	No	Confinement during the war; banishment on pain of death, one year after peace.	Yes

=== Isère ===
9 députés and 3 substitutes

Députés	Is Louis Capet guilty of conspiracy against public liberty and attacks against the general security of the State?	Should the judgment of the National Convention against Louis Capet be submitted for ratification by the people?	What punishment should be imposed on Louis?	Should there be a reprieve of the judgment against Louis Capet?
fr:Mathieu Baudran	Yes, justified	No	Death	No
fr: Louis-Benoît Genevois-Duraisin	Yes	No	Death	No
fr: Joseph Sébastien Servonat	Yes	Yes, as a legislator	Confinement and banishment after the war, on pain of death.	Yes
Jean-Pierre-André Amar	Yes	No	Death	No
fr: Léonard Joseph Prunelle de Lière	Yes	No	Banishment without delay of Louis with all his family, on pain of death.	Sick
fr:André Réal	Yes	Yes	Detention during the war, with this punishment to be commuted in calmer times to perpetual banishment.	No
fr:Pierre Joseph Didier Boissieu	Yes	As a judge no, as a legislator yes (the 'no' vote was recorded).	Confinement during the war and banishment after peace.	No
fr:Jean-Joseph-Victor Genissieu	Yes	No	Death with the Mailhe amendment.	Yes
fr: Pierre-François Charrel	Yes	No	Death	No

=== Jura ===
8 députés and 3 substitutes

Députés	Is Louis Capet guilty of conspiracy against public liberty and attacks against the general security of the State?	Should the judgment of the National Convention against Louis Capet be submitted for ratification by the people?	What punishment should be imposed on Louis?	Should there be a reprieve of the judgment against Louis Capet?
Théodore Vernier	Yes	Yes, justified	Detention and banishment after peace.	Yes
fr: Jacques-Henri Laurenceot	Yes	Yes	Confinement and banishment of Louis and all his family after peace.	Yes
fr:Antoine Grenot	Yes	Yes	Death	Yes
fr: Claude-Charles Prost	Yes	No	Death	No
fr:Pierre-Marie-Athanase Babey	Yes	Yes	Confinement until peace, and banishment at that time on pain of death.	Yes
fr:Jean-Claude Amyon	Yes	Yes	Death	No
fr:Étienne Joseph Ferroux	Yes	Yes	Death	Yes
fr:Marc-François Bonguyod	Yes	Yes	Detention in perpetuity, to be commuted to deportation if circumstances allow.	Yes

=== Landes ===
6 députés and 2 substitutes

Députés	Is Louis Capet guilty of conspiracy against public liberty and attacks against the general security of the State?	Should the judgment of the National Convention against Louis Capet be submitted for ratification by the people?	What punishment should be imposed on Louis?	Should there be a reprieve of the judgment against Louis Capet?
fr:Pierre-Arnaud Dartigoeyte	Yes	No	Death	No
fr: Jean-Baptiste Lefranc	Yes	No	Banishment, and beforehand detention until peace.	Yes
fr:Paul Cadroy	Yes	No	Detention.	Yes
Roger Ducos	Yes	No	Death	No
fr:Jean Dyzès	Yes	No	Death	No
fr:Jean-Baptiste Pierre Saurine	Yes	Yes	Detention of Louis and all his family in a safe place until peace is solidly established, unless we then take such a course as we deem expedient.	Yes

=== Loir-et-Cher ===
7 députés and 5 substitutes

Députés	Is Louis Capet guilty of conspiracy against public liberty and attacks against the general security of the State?	Should the judgment of the National Convention against Louis Capet be submitted for ratification by the people?	What punishment should be imposed on Louis?	Should there be a reprieve of the judgment against Louis Capet?
Henri Grégoire	en mission	en mission	en mission	en mission
François Chabot	Yes	No	Death	No
fr:Marcou Brisson	Yes	No	Death	No
fr:Augustin Frécine	Yes	No	Death	No
fr:Claude-Nicolas Leclerc	Yes	No	Perpetual detention.	Yes
fr: Pierre-Étienne Venaille-Bodin	Yes	No	Death	No
fr:André Foussedoire	Yes	No	Death	No

=== Loire ===
Département not created until November 1793.

=== Haute-Loire ===
7 députés and 4 substitutes

Députés	Is Louis Capet guilty of conspiracy against public liberty and attacks against the general security of the State?	Should the judgment of the National Convention against Louis Capet be submitted for ratification by the people?	What punishment should be imposed on Louis?	Should there be a reprieve of the judgment against Louis Capet?
fr: Claude-André-Benoît Reynaud	Yes	No	Death	No
fr: Balthazar Faure	Yes	No	Death	No
fr: Joseph-Étienne Delcher	Yes	No, justified	Death	No
fr: Antoine Rongiès	Yes	No	Death	No
Joseph Bonet de Treyches	Yes	Yes	Death	Yes
Armand-Gaston Camus	en mission	en mission	en mission	en mission
fr: Jean-André Barthélémy	Yes	Yes	Death	No

=== Loire-Inférieure ===
8 députés and 3 substitutes

Députés	Is Louis Capet guilty of conspiracy against public liberty and attacks against the general security of the State?	Should the judgment of the National Convention against Louis Capet be submitted for ratification by the people?	What punishment should be imposed on Louis?	Should there be a reprieve of the judgment against Louis Capet?
fr:Jean Nicolas Méaulle	Yes	No, justified	Death	No
fr:Julien-Urbain-François-Marie-Riel Lefebvre de La Chauvière	Yes	Yes	Confinement and deportation after peace.	Yes
fr:Étienne Chaillon	Yes	Yes	Confinement throughout the war, and banishment after peace.	Yes
fr:François Mellinet	Yes	Yes	Confinement during the war and deportation after peace.	Yes
fr:François-Toussaint Villers	Yes	No	Death	No
Joseph Fouché	Yes	No	Death	No
fr:François-Joseph Jary	Yes	Yes	Confinement until peace and perpetual banishment once the republican government is solidly established.	Yes
fr:Pierre Coustard	Yes	Yes	Confinement until peace and banishment after the war.	Yes

=== Loiret ===
9 députés and 4 substitutes

Députés	Is Louis Capet guilty of conspiracy against public liberty and attacks against the general security of the State?	Should the judgment of the National Convention against Louis Capet be submitted for ratification by the people?	What punishment should be imposed on Louis?	Should there be a reprieve of the judgment against Louis Capet?
fr: Michel Gentil	Yes	Yes	Confinement until general peace, and the consolidation of liberty, then deportation after the war.	Abstained
fr:Jean Philippe Garran de Coulon	Yes	Yes	Confinement.	Yes
fr: Louis-Pierre-Nicolas-Marie Lepage	Yes	No	Detention during the war and banishment after peace.	Yes
fr: Bon Thomas Pellé	Yes, not as a judge but as a member of a legislative and political body.	No	Detention during the war and perpetual deportation thereafter.	Yes
fr:Pierre Lombard-Lachaux	Yes	No	Death	Yes
fr: Pierre Guérin des Marchais	Yes	No	Confinement until peace, and expulsion after the war.	Yes
fr: René-Louis Delagueulle de Coinces	Yes	No	Death	No
Jean-Baptiste Louvet de Couvray	Yes	Yes, justified	Death with a reprieve until the people accept the new Constitution.	Yes
Léonard Bourdon	Yes	Yes	Death	No

=== Lot ===
10 députés and 3 substitutes

Députés	Is Louis Capet guilty of conspiracy against public liberty and attacks against the general security of the State?	Should the judgment of the National Convention against Louis Capet be submitted for ratification by the people?	What punishment should be imposed on Louis?	Should there be a reprieve of the judgment against Louis Capet?
fr:Jean-Baptiste La Boissière	Yes	No, justified	Death with the Mailhe amendment.	Yes
fr:Étienne Cledel	Yes	No	Death	No
fr:Jean Salleles	Yes	Yes	Confinement until peace and then banishment.	Yes
Jeanbon Saint-André	Yes	No	Death	No
fr:Hugues-Guillaume-Bernard-Joseph Monmayou	Yes	No	Death	No
Jean-Baptiste Cavaignac	Yes	No	Death	No
fr:Jean-Pierre Bouygues	Yes	No	Confinement.	Yes
fr:Jean-Baptiste Cayla	Yes	No	Sick	Sick
fr:Pierre Delbrel	Yes	No, justified	Death with a reprieve until the Convention has taken measures for general security concerning the Bourbon family.	Yes
fr:Barthélemy Albouys	Yes	Yes	Confinement until peace and then banishment.	Yes

=== Lot-et-Garonne ===
9 députés and 3 substitutes

Députés	Is Louis Capet guilty of conspiracy against public liberty and attacks against the general security of the State?	Should the judgment of the National Convention against Louis Capet be submitted for ratification by the people?	What punishment should be imposed on Louis?	Should there be a reprieve of the judgment against Louis Capet?
fr:Antoine Vidalot	Yes	No	Death	No
fr:Antoine Jean Blaise Laurent	Yes	Yes	Confinement.	Yes
fr:Pierre Paganel	Yes	No	Death with the Mailhe amendment.	Yes
fr:Jean-Baptiste-Joseph Claverye	Yes	Yes	Confinement until peace and then banishment.	Yes
fr:Jean Félix Larroche	Yes	Yes	Detention during the war and banishment after peace.	Yes
fr:Pierre Boussion	Yes	Yes	Death	No
fr:Pierre-Jules Guyet-Laprade	Yes	Yes	Detention during the war and banishment after peace.	Yes
fr:Marc-Antoine Fournel	Yes	No	Death	Yes
fr:Thomas Noguères	Yes	Yes	Confinement until peace and banishment at a suitable time.	Yes

=== Lozère ===
5 députés and 2 substitutes

Députés	Is Louis Capet guilty of conspiracy against public liberty and attacks against the general security of the State?	Should the judgment of the National Convention against Louis Capet be submitted for ratification by the people?	What punishment should be imposed on Louis?	Should there be a reprieve of the judgment against Louis Capet?
fr:Jean-André Barrot	Yes	Yes	Deportation of Louis, his wife and his two children to one of our most inaccessible islands, guarded by a corps of Parisians until this measure is judged no longer appropriate.	No
fr:Alexandre Paul Guérin de Tournel de Joyeuse de Chateauneuf-Randon	Yes	No	Death	No
fr:Laurent Servière	Yes	No	Confinement in a secure location, and death only in the event of the enemy invading French territory.	Sick
Jean Pelet	en mission	en mission	en mission	en mission
fr:Pierre-Laurent Monestier	Yes	No	Death, asking that the punishment not be enacted until after peace.	No

=== Maine-et-Loire ===
11 députés and 4 substitutes

Députés	Is Louis Capet guilty of conspiracy against public liberty and attacks against the general security of the State?	Should the judgment of the National Convention against Louis Capet be submitted for ratification by the people?	What punishment should be imposed on Louis?	Should there be a reprieve of the judgment against Louis Capet?
fr:René-Pierre Choudieu	Yes	No	Death	No
Joseph Delaunay	Yes	No	Death	No
fr:Louis-Charles-Auguste de Houlières	Yes	Yes	Confinement during the war and deportation after peace, as well as for his family.	Absent
Louis-Marie de La Révellière-Lépeaux	Yes	No, justified	Death	No
fr:Urbain-René Pilastre de la Brardière	Yes	No	Confinement until peace, then banishment.	Yes
Jean-Baptiste Leclerc	Yes	No	Death	No
fr:Marie-François Dandenac	Yes	No	Confinement until peace and then banishment.	Yes
fr:Pierre-Marie Delaunay	Yes	No	Confinement until peace and then banishment.	Yes
fr:Charles-François-Jean Pérard	Yes	No, justified	Death	No
fr:Jacques Dandenac	Yes	No	Deportation of all the prisoners in the Temple.	Yes
fr:Julien-Camille Le Maignan	Yes	No	Confinement until peace and then banishment.	Yes

=== Manche ===
13 députés and 5 substitutes

Députés	Is Louis Capet guilty of conspiracy against public liberty and attacks against the general security of the State?	Should the judgment of the National Convention against Louis Capet be submitted for ratification by the people?	What punishment should be imposed on Louis?	Should there be a reprieve of the judgment against Louis Capet?
fr:Gervais Sauvé	Yes	Yes	Confinement until peace, and then deportation.	Yes
fr:Jacques Poisson de Coudreville	Yes	Yes	Confinement until peace, and then deportation.	Yes
fr:Jean Angélique Lemoine-Devilleneuve	Yes	No	Death	No
Étienne-François Letourneur	Yes	Yes	Death	No
fr:Bon-Jacques Ribet de Rugneville	Yes	Yes	Death with a reprieve until the expulsion of the Bourbons.	Yes
fr:Pierre Louis Pinel	Yes	Yes	Detention until peace and then deportation.	Yes
Jean-Baptiste Le Carpentier	Yes	No	Death	No
fr:Édouard-Léonor Havin	Yes	Yes	Death	Yes
fr:Siméon Bonnesœur-Bourginière	Yes	Yes	Death with a reprieve until twenty four hours after the decree of accusation against Marie-Antoinette and the banishment of the Bourbons.	Yes
fr:Jacques Engerran-Deslandes	Yes	Yes	Perpetual detention.	Yes
fr:Charles-Louis-François Regnault de Bretel	Yes	No	Detention until the end of the war and banishment after peace.	Yes
fr:André-François Laurence	Yes	Yes	Death with a reprieve for as long as Spain does not declare war and until Germany has given us an honourable peace.	Yes
fr:Jean Michel Hubert-Dumanoir	Yes	Yes	Death	Yes

=== Marne ===
10 députés and 4 substitutes

Députés	Is Louis Capet guilty of conspiracy against public liberty and attacks against the general security of the State?	Should the judgment of the National Convention against Louis Capet be submitted for ratification by the people?	What punishment should be imposed on Louis?	Should there be a reprieve of the judgment against Louis Capet?
Pierre-Louis Prieur	Yes	No, justified	Death	No
Jacques-Alexis Thuriot de la Rosière	Yes	No	Death	No
Louis-Joseph Charlier	Yes	No	Death	No
Charles-François Delacroix	Yes	No	Death	No
fr:Jean-Louis Deville	Yes	No	Death	No
fr:Jean-Baptiste Poulain de Boutancourt	Yes	Yes	Confinement until the end of the war and banishment after peace.	Yes
Jean-Baptiste Drouet	Sick	Sick	Death	No
fr:Jean-Baptiste Armonville	Yes	No	Death	No
fr: François Joseph Blanc	Yes	No	Confinement during the war, and banishment after peace.	Yes
fr: Jean-César Battellier	Yes	No	Death	No

=== Haute-Marne ===
7 députés and 3 substitutes

Députés	Is Louis Capet guilty of conspiracy against public liberty and attacks against the general security of the State?	Should the judgment of the National Convention against Louis Capet be submitted for ratification by the people?	What punishment should be imposed on Louis?	Should there be a reprieve of the judgment against Louis Capet?
fr:Louis Guyardin	Yes	No	Death	No
fr:Simon-Edme Monnel	Yes	No	Death	No
Louis Félix Roux	Yes	No, justified	Death	No
fr:Anne Joseph Arnoux Valdruche	Yes	No	Death	No
fr:Guillaume Chaudron-Rousseau	Yes	No	Death	No
Pierre-Antoine Lalloy	Yes	No	Death	No
fr:Antoine-Hubert Wandelaincourt	Recused himself and justified his decision.	Recused himself.	Banishment after the war.	Yes

=== Mayenne ===
8 députés and 3 substitutes

Députés	Is Louis Capet guilty of conspiracy against public liberty and attacks against the general security of the State?	Should the judgment of the National Convention against Louis Capet be submitted for ratification by the people?	What punishment should be imposed on Louis?	Should there be a reprieve of the judgment against Louis Capet?
fr:Jacques-François Bissy	Yes	No	Death with a reprieve until foreign powers seek to invade the territory of the Republic; if they do not, the Convention should consider whether there are grounds for commuting the sentence.	Yes
fr:François Joachim Esnue-Lavallée	Yes	No	Death	No
fr:François Grosse-Durocher	Yes	No	Death	No
fr:Mathurin Enjubault	Yes	No	Death with a reprieve until foreign powers seek to invade the territory of the Republic; if they do not, the Convention should consider whether there are grounds for commuting the sentence.	Yes
fr:François Serveau-Touchevalier	Yes	No	Death with a reprieve until foreign powers seek to invade the territory of the Republic; if they do not, the Convention should consider whether there are grounds for commuting the sentence.	Yes
fr:René-François Plaichard Choltière	Yes	No	Detention until peace and banishment along with his family after the war.	Yes
Noël-Gabriel-Luce Villar	Yes	No	Detention during the war, and then banishment in perpetuity.	Yes
fr:René-François Lejeune	Yes	No	Perpetual detention.	Yes

=== Meurthe ===
8 députés and 3 substitutes

Députés	Is Louis Capet guilty of conspiracy against public liberty and attacks against the general security of the State?	Should the judgment of the National Convention against Louis Capet be submitted for ratification by the people?	What punishment should be imposed on Louis?	Should there be a reprieve of the judgment against Louis Capet?
fr:Jean-Baptiste Salle	Yes	Yes	Detention until peace, then banishment after the war.	Yes
François René Mallarmé	Yes	No	Death	No
fr:Antoine Levasseur	Yes	No	Death	No
fr:Étienne Mollevaut	Yes	Yes	Detention and exile once there is peace.	Yes
fr:Germain Bonneval	Yes	No	Death	No
fr:Luc-François Lalande	I declare that I am not a judge and in consequence I say neither yes nor no.	Yes	Banishment as quickly as possible.	Yes
Pierre Michel	Yes	Yes	Detention until the end of the war and banishment after peace.	Yes
fr:Joseph Zangiacomi	Yes	Yes	Detention during the war and banishment when public security permits.	Yes

=== Meuse ===
8 députés and 3 substitutes

Députés	Is Louis Capet guilty of conspiracy against public liberty and attacks against the general security of the State?	Should the judgment of the National Convention against Louis Capet be submitted for ratification by the people?	What punishment should be imposed on Louis?	Should there be a reprieve of the judgment against Louis Capet?
Jean Moreau	Yes	Yes	Banishment, which will only take place at peace.	Yes
fr:Jean-Joseph Marquis	Yes	Yes	Provisional detention as a hostage, then banishment.	Yes
fr:Charles Nicolas Tocquot	Yes	Yes	Provisional confinement and banishment after the war.	Yes
fr:Philippe-Laurent Pons de Verdun	Yes	No	Death	No
fr:Claude Jean Roussel	Yes	Yes	Detention until the end of the war, and banishment after peace.	Yes
fr:Claude Hubert Bazoche	Yes	Yes	Provisional detention as a hostage, then banishment.	Yes
Sébastien Humbert	Yes	Yes	Confinement during the war and banishment after peace.	Yes
fr:Jean-Baptiste Harmand	Yes	No	Immediate banishment with his wife, his children and his sister.	No

=== Morbihan ===
8 députés and 3 substitutes

Députés	Is Louis Capet guilty of conspiracy against public liberty and attacks against the general security of the State?	Should the judgment of the National Convention against Louis Capet be submitted for ratification by the people?	What punishment should be imposed on Louis?	Should there be a reprieve of the judgment against Louis Capet?
fr:Joseph-François Le Malliaud de Kerharnos	Yes	No	Provisional confinement and banishment after peace, on pain of death.	No
fr:Pierre Lehardy	Yes	Yes	Detention as long as the Republic remains at risk, or until the people accept the Constitution, then banishment along with all the Bourbons.	Yes
fr: Vincent Claude Corbel	Yes	No	Detention as a hostage, unless exceptional measures need to be taken if the territory of the Republic is invaded.	No
fr:Joseph Lequinio	Yes	No	Death	No
fr:Yves Marie Audrein	Yes	Yes	Death with the Mailhe amendment.	Yes
Pierre-Mathurin Gillet	Yes	No	Detention until the end of the war and banishment along with his family after peace.	No
fr:Guillaume Michel	Yes	No	Confinement during the war and then deportation, as soon as the safety of the Republic permits.	Yes
fr:Joseph Yves Roüault de Cosquéran	Yes	No	Confinement until the end of the war and expulsion after peace.	Yes

=== Moselle ===
8 députés and 3 substitutes

Députés	Is Louis Capet guilty of conspiracy against public liberty and attacks against the general security of the State?	Should the judgment of the National Convention against Louis Capet be submitted for ratification by the people?	What punishment should be imposed on Louis?	Should there be a reprieve of the judgment against Louis Capet?
Antoine Merlin de Thionville	en mission	en mission	en mission	en mission
fr:François Nicolas Anthoine	Yes	No, justified	Death	No
fr:Jean-Pierre Couturier	en mission	en mission	en mission	en mission
Nicolas Hentz	Yes	No	Death	No
fr:Nicolas François Blaux	Yes	No	Detention until peace and then banishment.	Yes
fr:Didier Thirion	Yes	No	Death	No
fr:Joseph Becker	Yes	No	Perpetual detention.	Yes
fr:Jean-Étienne Bar	Yes	No	Death	No

=== Nièvre ===
7 députés and 3 substitutes

Députés	Is Louis Capet guilty of conspiracy against public liberty and attacks against the general security of the State?	Should the judgment of the National Convention against Louis Capet be submitted for ratification by the people?	What punishment should be imposed on Louis?	Should there be a reprieve of the judgment against Louis Capet?
fr:Jean Sautereau	Yes	No	Death	Absent
fr:Joseph Charlemagne Dameron	Yes	No	Death	No
fr:Jean-Alban Lefiot	Yes	No	Death	No
fr:Jean Guillaume Guillerault-Bacoin	Yes	Yes	Death	No
fr:François Paul Legendre	Yes	No	Death	No
fr:Jacques Léonard Goyre-Laplanche	Yes	No	Death	No
Jean-Baptiste Jourdan	Yes	Yes	Provisional detention, then banishment when there will be no danger in proceeding to carry out this decree.	Yes

=== Nord ===
12 députés and 4 substitutes

Députés	Is Louis Capet guilty of conspiracy against public liberty and attacks against the general security of the State?	Should the judgment of the National Convention against Louis Capet be submitted for ratification by the people?	What punishment should be imposed on Louis?	Should there be a reprieve of the judgment against Louis Capet?
Philippe Antoine Merlin de Douai	Yes	No, justified	Death	No
Pierre Joseph Duhem	Yes	No	Death	No
fr:Eugène Constant Joseph César Gossuin	en mission	en mission	en mission	en mission
fr:Henri Louis Joseph Cochet	Yes	No	Death	No
fr: Jean-Jacques Fockedey	Yes	Yes	Detention of Louis and his family until the Republic is no longer in danger; then banishment.	Yes
fr: Gaspard Jean Joseph Lesage-Senault	Yes	No	Death	No
fr: Antoine François Carpentier	Yes	No	Death	No
fr:Philippe Constant Joseph Briez	Yes	No	Death	No
fr: Albert Sallengros	Yes	No	Death	No
fr: François-Martin Poultier	Yes	No	Death	No
fr: Eustache Jean-Marie D'Aoust	Yes	No	Death	No
fr: Charles Louis Boyaval	Yes	No	Death	No

=== Oise ===
12 députés and 5 substitutes

Députés	Is Louis Capet guilty of conspiracy against public liberty and attacks against the general security of the State?	Should the judgment of the National Convention against Louis Capet be submitted for ratification by the people?	What punishment should be imposed on Louis?	Should there be a reprieve of the judgment against Louis Capet?
fr: Jacques-Michel Coupé	Yes	No	Death	No
fr: Étienne Nicolas de Calon	Yes	No	Death	No
fr: Jean-Baptiste Massieu	Yes	No	Death	No
Charles de Villette	Yes	No	Confinement and banishment after peace.	Yes
fr:Jean-Baptiste Charles Mathieu	Yes	No	Death	No
Jean-Baptiste Cloots	Yes	No	Death	No
fr:Louis-François Portiez	Yes	No	Death with the Mailhe amendment.	No
fr: Charles-François-Marie Godéfroy	en mission	en mission	en mission	
fr: Jacques Isoré	Yes	No	Death	No
fr:Antoine Delamarre	Yes	Yes	Confinement until six months after peace is established, then banishment without the power to return, on pain of death.	Yes
François Louis Bourdon	Yes	No	Death	No
fr: François Siméon Bézard	Yes	No	Death	No

=== Orne ===
10 députés and 7 substitutes

Députés	Is Louis Capet guilty of conspiracy against public liberty and attacks against the general security of the State?	Should the judgment of the National Convention against Louis Capet be submitted for ratification by the people?	What punishment should be imposed on Louis?	Should there be a reprieve of the judgment against Louis Capet?
fr:Charles Éléonor Dufriche-Valazé	Yes	Yes	Death with a reprieve until the fate of the family of Louis Capet is decided.	Yes
fr:Charles Ambroise Bertrand de La Hosdinière	Yes	Yes, justified	Death	No
fr:Pierre François Nicolas Plet-Beauprey	Yes	Yes	Death with a reprieve until the National Convention has taken measures to ensure that the family of the Bourbons, particularly Philippe-Égalité, can not damage the establishment of a united and indivisible Republic.	Yes
fr:Pierre-François Duboë	Yes	Yes	Detention during the current war and perpetual banishment after peace, on pain of death if he should return to French territory.	Yes
fr:Jacques-Claude Dugué d'Assé	Yes	Yes	Banishment, but not to be enacted until after peace.	Yes
fr:Charles Thomas-Laprise	Yes	Abstained	Death with a reprieve until enemies invade our territory.	Yes
fr:Jean-Denis Fourmy	Yes	Yes	Detention until peace and deportation thereafter, on pain of death if this sentence is contravened.	Yes
fr:Louis Toussaint Jullien-Dubois	Yes	Yes	Death	No
fr:Louis-Jacques Collombel de La Roussellière	Yes	No	Death	No
fr:Charles Desgrouas	Yes	Yes	Death	No

=== Paris ===
24 députés and 8 substitutes

Députés	Is Louis Capet guilty of conspiracy against public liberty and attacks against the general security of the State?	Should the judgment of the National Convention against Louis Capet be submitted for ratification by the people?	What punishment should be imposed on Louis?	Should there be a reprieve of the judgment against Louis Capet?
Maximilien de Robespierre	Yes	No	Death	No
Georges Jacques Danton	en mission	en mission	Death	No
Jean-Marie Collot d'Herbois	en mission	en mission	Death	No
Pierre Louis Manuel	Yes	Yes	Imprisonment outside Paris, then deportation.	Resigned
Jacques Nicolas Billaud-Varenne	Yes	No, justified	Death	No
Camille Desmoulins	Yes	No, justified	Death	No
Jean-Paul Marat	Yes	No	Death	No
fr:Louis-Charles de Lavicomterie	Yes	No, justified	Death	No
Louis Legendre	Yes	No	Death	No
fr:Nicolas Raffron de Trouillet	Yes, justified	No	Death	No
fr:Étienne-Jean Panis	Yes	No	Death	No
Antoine Louis François Sergent dit Sergent-Marceau	Yes	No, justified	Death	No
fr:Pierre-François-Joseph Robert	Yes	No, justified	Death	No
Jean Dusaulx	Yes	Yes	Detention during the war and banishment after peace.	Yes
Stanislas Fréron	Yes	No	Death	No
fr:Charles Nicolas Beauvais de Préau	Yes	No	Death	No
Fabre d'Églantine	Yes	No, justified	Death	No
fr:Charles-Nicolas Osselin	Yes, justified	No, justified	Death	No
Augustin Robespierre	Yes	No	Death	No
Jacques-Louis David	Yes	No	Death	No
fr:Antoine Boucher Saint-Sauveur	Yes	No, justified	Death	No
fr:Joseph François Laignelot	Yes	No	Death	No
fr:Jean-Jacques Thomas	Yes	No	Detention until peace on condition that Louis will suffer death the moment the powers invade our territory.	Yes
Philippe-Égalité	Yes	No	Death	No

=== Pas-de-Calais ===
Speech by d'Armand-Benoit-Joseph Guffroy, député from Pas-de-Calais, on the punishment of Louis XVI

11 députés and 5 substitutes

Députés	Is Louis Capet guilty of conspiracy against public liberty and attacks against the general security of the State?	Should the judgment of the National Convention against Louis Capet be submitted for ratification by the people?	What punishment should be imposed on Louis?	Should there be a reprieve of the judgment against Louis Capet?
Lazare Nicolas Marguerite Carnot	Yes	No	Death	No
Ernest Dominique François Joseph Duquesnoy	Yes	No	Death	No
Philippe-François-Joseph Le Bas	Yes	No	Death	No
Thomas Paine	Yes	No	Detention until the end of the war and perpetual banishment after the war.	Yes
fr:Jean-Baptiste Personne	Yes	Yes, justified	Detention during the war and banishment after peace.	Yes
fr:Armand-Joseph Guffroy	Yes	No	Death	No
fr:Nicolas François Enlart	Yes	No	Deportation and detention in one of our islands during the war and banishment after peace.	Absent
fr:Philippe-Albert Bollet	Yes	No	Death	No
fr:Antoine-Guillain Magniez	Yes	Yes	Detention during the war and banishment after peace.	Yes
Pierre Daunou	Yes, justified	No	Deportation after peace and provisional detention during the war.	Yes
fr:Charles-Zachée-Joseph Varlet	Yes	Yes	Confinement during the war and perpetual banishment after peace, on pain of death.	Yes

=== Puy-de-Dôme ===
12 députés and 4 substitutes

Députés	Is Louis Capet guilty of conspiracy against public liberty and attacks against the general security of the State?	Should the judgment of the National Convention against Louis Capet be submitted for ratification by the people?	What punishment should be imposed on Louis?	Should there be a reprieve of the judgment against Louis Capet?
Georges Couthon	Yes	No	Death	No
fr:Pierre Gibergues	Yes	No	Death	No
Étienne Christophe Maignet	Yes	No	Death	No
Charles-Gilbert Romme	Yes	No	Death	No
Pierre-Amable de Soubrany	Yes	No	Death	No
Jean Henri Bancal des Issarts	Yes	Yes	Imprisonment as a hostage, to answer with his head if the enemy invades French territory, and after the war, perpetual banishment.	Yes
fr:Jean-Baptiste Girot-Pouzol	Yes	Yes	Detention until peace, and then perpetual banishment of the whole family.	Yes
fr:Claude-Antoine Rudel	Yes	No	Death	No
fr:Joseph Artaud-Blanval	Yes	No	Death	No
fr:Jean-Baptiste-Benoît Monestier	Yes	No	Death	No
fr:Jacques Antoine Dulaure	Yes	No	Death	No
fr:Jean Laloue	Yes	Yes	Death	No

=== Basses-Pyrénées ===
6 députés and 3 substitutes

Députés	Is Louis Capet guilty of conspiracy against public liberty and attacks against the general security of the State?	Should the judgment of the National Convention against Louis Capet be submitted for ratification by the people?	What punishment should be imposed on Louis?	Should there be a reprieve of the judgment against Louis Capet?
Barthélémy-Jean-Baptiste Sanadon	Yes	Yes	Detention, until the Republic is recognised by the powers of Europe; then banishment, on pain of death.	Yes
Antoine Conte	I vote yes as a legislator. As a judge I have nothing to say.	Yes	Detention during the war, and banishment after peace, on pain of death.	Yes
fr:Joseph Pémartin	Yes	No	Detention, and perpetual banishment after peace.	Yes
fr:Arnaud Jean Meillan	Yes	Yes	Detention and banishment after the Republic has been consolidated.	Yes
fr:Antoine Casenave	Yes	Yes	Confinement of Louis and his family, until after peace, then perpetual exile.	Yes
fr:Étienne Neveu	Yes	Yes	Detention for as long as the war lasts, unless exceptional measures are required depending on the circumstances after peace.	Yes

=== Hautes-Pyrénées ===
6 députés and 2 substitutes

Députés	Is Louis Capet guilty of conspiracy against public liberty and attacks against the general security of the State?	Should the judgment of the National Convention against Louis Capet be submitted for ratification by the people?	What punishment should be imposed on Louis?	Should there be a reprieve of the judgment against Louis Capet?
Bertrand Barère de Vieuzac	Yes	No	Death	No
fr: Pierre Dupont de Bigorre	Yes	Yes, justified	Death with a reprieve until the territory of the Republic is purged of the Bourbons.	Yes
Brice Gertoux	Yes	No	Detention during the war and banishment after peace.	Yes
fr: Jean-Pierre Picqué	Yes	No	Death, with a reprieve until the end of hostilities.	Yes
Jean-Bertrand Féraud	Yes	No	Death	No
fr: Jean Lacrampe	Yes	Yes	Death	No

=== Pyrénées-Orientales ===
5 députés and 2 substitutes

Députés	Is Louis Capet guilty of conspiracy against public liberty and attacks against the general security of the State?	Should the judgment of the National Convention against Louis Capet be submitted for ratification by the people?	What punishment should be imposed on Louis?	Should there be a reprieve of the judgment against Louis Capet?
fr:Joseph Guiter	Yes	Yes	Detention during the war, and banishment after peace.	Yes
Joseph Fabre	Sick	Sick	Sick	Sick
Jean Bonaventure Birotteau	Yes	Yes	Death with a reprieve until peace and the expulsion of the Bourbons.	Yes
fr: François-Étienne Montégut	Yes, justified	No	Death	No
fr:Joseph Cassanyes	Yes	No, justified	Death	No

=== Bas-Rhin ===
9 députés and 4 substitutes

Députés	Is Louis Capet guilty of conspiracy against public liberty and attacks against the general security of the State?	Should the judgment of the National Convention against Louis Capet be submitted for ratification by the people?	What punishment should be imposed on Louis?	Should there be a reprieve of the judgment against Louis Capet?
Philippe Rühl	en mission	en mission	en mission	en mission
fr: Claude-Hilaire Laurent	Yes	No	Death	No
Pierre-Louis Bentabole	Yes	No	Death	No
fr:Georges Frédéric Dentzel	en mission	en mission	en mission	en mission
Jean-Antoine Louis du Bas-Rhin	Yes	No	Death	No
Louis François Antoine Arbogast	Yes	No	Detention until peace, then banishment.	Abstained
fr:Philibert Simond	en mission	en mission	en mission	en mission
fr: Jean-François Ehrmann	Sick	Sick	Sick	Sick
fr: Marie-Frédéric-Henri Christiani	Yes	No	Detention during the war and banishment after peace.	Yes

=== Haut-Rhin ===
7 députés and 3 substitutes

Députés	Is Louis Capet guilty of conspiracy against public liberty and attacks against the general security of the State?	Should the judgment of the National Convention against Louis Capet be submitted for ratification by the people?	What punishment should be imposed on Louis?	Should there be a reprieve of the judgment against Louis Capet?
Jean-François Rewbell	en mission	en mission	en mission	en mission
fr:François Joseph Ritter	Yes	No	Death	No
François Sébastien Christophe Laporte	Yes	No	Death	No
fr:Jean-Joseph Johannot	Yes	No	Death with the Mailhe amendment.	Yes
fr:Jean-Adam Pflieger, l'aîné	Yes	No	Death	No
fr: Jean Bernard Albert	Yes	Yes	Confinement until peace, then banishment.	Yes
fr: François Louis Dubois	Yes	No	Detention until peace and banishment when public safety permits.	Yes

=== Rhône-et-Loire ===
15 députés and 5 substitutes

Note: In November 1793 this département was divided into Loire and Rhône.

Députés	Is Louis Capet guilty of conspiracy against public liberty and attacks against the general security of the State?	Should the judgment of the National Convention against Louis Capet be submitted for ratification by the people?	What punishment should be imposed on Louis?	Should there be a reprieve of the judgment against Louis Capet?
fr:Charles Antoine Chasset	Yes	No	Detention until peace and then banishment.	No
fr:Jean-Baptiste Claude Henri Dupuy	Yes	No	Death	No
fr:Louis Vitet	Yes	Yes	Detention, and expulsion of "the race of the Bourbons".	Yes
fr:Pierre Dubouchet	Yes	No	Death	No
fr:Marcelin Béraud	Yes	Yes	Detention until the end of the war, banishment after peace.	Yes
fr:Jean-Baptiste Pressavin	Yes	No	Death	No
fr:Marcelin Moulin	Yes	No	Death with a reprieve until after the expulsion of all the Bourbons.	Yes
fr:Antoine Michet	Yes	Yes	Perpetual detention.	No
Eugène Louis Melchior Patrin	Yes	Yes	Detention until the end of the war and banishment after peace.	Yes
fr:Jacques Forest	Yes	Yes	Detention until peace, and then banishment.	Yes
fr:Noël Pointe	Yes	No, justified	Death	No
fr:Joseph-Marie Cusset	Yes	No	Death	No
fr:Claude Javogues	Yes	No	Death	No
François-Xavier Lanthenas	Yes	No	Death with a reprieve if our enemies leave us in peace; in this case Louis should only be exiled outside the territory of the Republic, when the Constitution has perfectly bedded in.	No
fr:Antoine Fournier	Yes	Yes	Detention until the end of the war, banishment after peace.	Yes

=== Haute-Saône ===
7 députés and 3 substitutes

Députés	Is Louis Capet guilty of conspiracy against public liberty and attacks against the general security of the State?	Should the judgment of the National Convention against Louis Capet be submitted for ratification by the people?	What punishment should be imposed on Louis?	Should there be a reprieve of the judgment against Louis Capet?
Charles Claude Christophe Gourdan	Yes	No	Death	No
fr:Claude-Bonaventure Vigneron	Yes	No	Confinement during the war, and banishment after peace.	Yes
Claude François Bruno Siblot	Yes	No	Death with the Mailhe amendment.	No
fr: Claude François Xavier Chauvier	Yes	No	Detention for the time being, and banishment after peace.	No
fr: Claude-François Balivet	Yes	No	Provisional detention, and banishment after peace.	Yes
fr:Claude-Pierre Dornier	Yes	No	Death	No
fr: Claude-Antoine Bolot	Yes	No	Death	Yes

=== Saône-et-Loire ===
11 députés and 6 substitutes

Députés	Is Louis Capet guilty of conspiracy against public liberty and attacks against the general security of the State?	Should the judgment of the National Convention against Louis Capet be submitted for ratification by the people?	What punishment should be imposed on Louis?	Should there be a reprieve of the judgment against Louis Capet?
fr:Jean-Marie Gelin	Yes	No	Death	No
fr:Claude Laurent Masuyer	Yes	No	Detention until peace, and then banishment with his whole family.	No
fr:Jean-Louis Carra	Yes	No	Death	No
fr:Claude-Nicolas Guillermin	Yes	No, justified	Death	No
fr:Jacques Reverchon	Yes	No	Death	No
fr:Ferdinand Guillemardet	Yes	No	Death	No
Marc Antoine Baudot	Yes	No, justified	Death	No
fr:Mathieu-Nicolas Bertucat	Yes	Yes	Perpetual detention.	Yes
fr:Antoine Mailly	Yes	No	Death	No
fr:Marie-François Moreau	Yes	No	Death	No
fr:François-Agnès Mont-Gilbert	Yes	No	Death with a reprieve until the time when the Republic enjoys the full benefits of its new Constitution and peace is securely established; execution of the death warrant in the event of a new invasion of our territory.	Yes

=== Sarthe ===
10 députés and 4 substitutes

Députés	Is Louis Capet guilty of conspiracy against public liberty and attacks against the general security of the State?	Should the judgment of the National Convention against Louis Capet be submitted for ratification by the people?	What punishment should be imposed on Louis?	Should there be a reprieve of the judgment against Louis Capet?
Joseph-Étienne Richard	Yes	No	Death	No
fr: René François-Primaudière	Yes	No	Death	No
fr:Gabriel-René-Louis Salmon	Yes	No	Confinement during the war, and expulsion from the territory of the Republic after peace and the establishment of the Constitution.	Yes
Pierre Philippeaux	Yes	No	Death	No
fr:Laurent-Martial-Stanislas Boutroue	Yes	No	Death	No
René Levasseur	Yes	No	Death	No
fr: Jacques-René Chevalier	Yes	Yes	Detention during the war, and banishment after peace.	Yes
fr: Louis-Joseph Froger-Plisson	Yes	No	Death	No
Emmanuel-Joseph Sieyes	Yes	No	Death	No
fr: Emmanuel-Pierre Le Tourneur	Yes	No	Death	No

=== Seine-Inférieure ===
16 députés and 6 substitutes

Députés	Is Louis Capet guilty of conspiracy against public liberty and attacks against the general security of the State?	Should the judgment of the National Convention against Louis Capet be submitted for ratification by the people?	What punishment should be imposed on Louis?	Should there be a reprieve of the judgment against Louis Capet?
Antoine Louis Albitte	Yes	No	Death	No
fr: Pierre-Pomponne-Amédée Pocholle	Yes	No	Death	No
fr: Antoine-François Hardy	Yes	Abstained	Detention until the end of the war and banishment after peace.	Yes
fr: Jean-Baptiste Yger	Yes	Yes	Detention during the war and banishment afterwards.	Yes
fr: Charles-Robert Hecquet	Yes	Yes	Detention until the end of the war and banishment after peace, on pain of death.	Yes
Jean-Pierre Duval	Yes	Yes	Detention until the end of the war and banishment after peace.	Yes
fr: Pierre-Charles-Victor Vincent	Yes	Yes	Detention during the war, and banishment for Louis and his family when the nation judges it suitable.	Yes
fr: Pierre-Joseph-Denis-Guillaume Faure	Yes, justified	Yes	Detention during the war.	Yes
fr: Pierre-Louis-Stanislas Lefebvre	Yes	No	Detention during the war, and banishment after peace.	Yes
fr:Charles-Auguste-Esprit-Rose Blutel	Yes	Yes	Detention during the war and banishment after peace.	Yes
fr:Jacques-Charles Bailleul	Yes	Yes	Detention.	Sick
fr: Jacques Christophe Luc Mariette	Yes	Yes	Detention during the war and banishment thereafter, and nonetheless death in the event that foreign powers make some efforts in his favour.	Yes
Pierre Philippe Doublet	Yes	Yes	Detention and banishment after the consolidation of the Republic.	Yes
fr: Alexandre-Jean Ruault	Yes	No	Detention and banishment after the consolidation of the Republic.	Yes
fr: Jacques François Bourgois	Yes	Yes	Detention during the war and banishment thereafter.	Yes
fr: Jacques-Charles-Gabriel Delahaye	Yes, justified	Yes	Detention for the present, and banishment after the war.	Yes

=== Seine-et-Marne ===
11 députés and 11 substitutes

Députés	Is Louis Capet guilty of conspiracy against public liberty and attacks against the general security of the State?	Should the judgment of the National Convention against Louis Capet be submitted for ratification by the people?	What punishment should be imposed on Louis?	Should there be a reprieve of the judgment against Louis Capet?
fr:François-Pierre-Ange Mauduyt	Yes	No	Death	No
fr: Edme Louis Barthélemy Bailly de Juilly	Yes	Yes	Provisional detention and perpetual banishment two years after peace.	Yes
fr: Armand-Constant Tellier	Yes	No	Death	No
fr: Michel-Martial Cordier	Yes	No	Death	No
fr: Jean-Nicolas Viquy	Yes	Yes	Imprisonment until peace and then perpetual banishment.	Yes
fr: Marie-Joseph Geoffroy	Yes	Yes	Detention during the war and deportation after peace.	Yes
fr: Claude Bernard des Sablons	Yes, as a holder of a mandate from the people, but I do not wish to fulfil the role of a judge.	Yes	Death with a reprieve until the Constitution has been accepted.	Yes
fr: Louis-Alexandre Himbert de Flégny	Yes	Yes	Confinement until peace and exile at the end of hostilities.	Absent
fr: Christophe Opoix	Yes	Abstained	Detention until peace and then deportation.	Yes
fr: Jean-Claude Defrance	Yes	No	Detention during the war and banishment after peace.	Yes
fr: Louis-Toussaint-Cécile Bernier	Yes	Yes	Imprisonment until the Constitution is accepted. Then the people should decide his fate.	Yes

=== Seine-et-Oise ===
14 députés and 6 substitutes

Députés	Is Louis Capet guilty of conspiracy against public liberty and attacks against the general security of the State?	Should the judgment of the National Convention against Louis Capet be submitted for ratification by the people?	What punishment should be imposed on Louis?	Should there be a reprieve of the judgment against Louis Capet?
Laurent Lecointre	Yes	No	Death	No
fr: Nicolas Haussmann	en mission	en mission	en mission	en mission
Jean Bassal	Yes	No	Death	No
Charles-Jean-Marie Alquier	Yes	No	Death with a reprieve until a peace is signed, then the punishment to be executed or commuted, but execution of the sentence in the event of a foreign invasion of French territory.	Yes
Antoine Joseph Gorsas	Yes	Yes	Detention during the war and perpetual banishment after peace.	No
fr: Pierre-Jean Audouin	Yes	No	Death	No
Jean-Baptiste Treilhard	Yes	No	Death with a reprieve in the greater interests of the Republic.	Yes
fr: Denis Roy	Yes	No	Death with a reprieve until the people have ratified the Constitution presented to them.	Yes
Jean-Lambert Tallien	Yes	No	Death	No
Marie-Jean Hérault de Séchelles	en mission	en mission	en mission	en mission
Louis Sébastien Mercier	Yes	No	Detention in perpetuity.	Yes
Armand de Kersaint	Yes	Yes, justified	Deferral of the pronouncement of punishment until after the war; detention until then.	Absent
Marie-Joseph Chénier	Yes	No	Death	No
Charles-François Dupuis	Yes, as a representative of the people and not as a judge.	No	Detention, until the consolidation of the Constitution, at which point the people should pronounce on the fate of Louis, as it may judge appropriate.	Yes

=== Deux-Sèvres ===
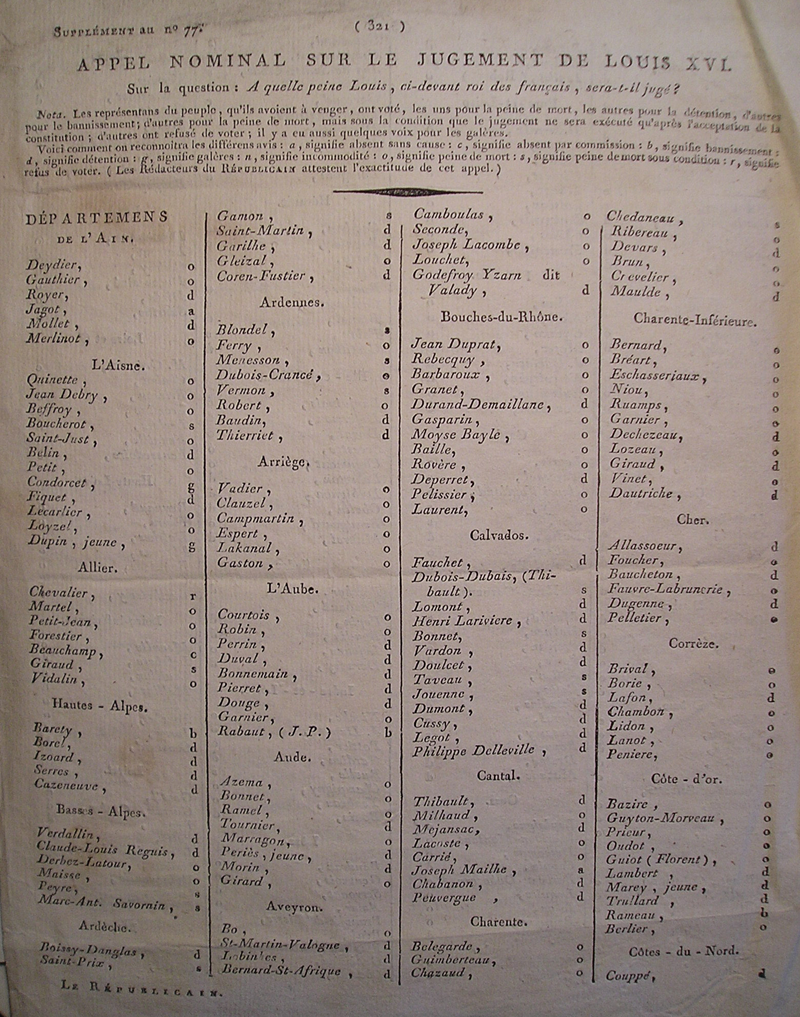
roll call of votes by département on the third question

7 députés and 3 substitutes

Députés	Is Louis Capet guilty of conspiracy against public liberty and attacks against the general security of the State?	Should the judgment of the National Convention against Louis Capet be submitted for ratification by the people?	What punishment should be imposed on Louis?	Should there be a reprieve of the judgment against Louis Capet?
Michel Mathieu Lecointe-Puyraveau	Yes	Yes, justified	Death	No
fr: Louis-Alexandre Jard-Panvillier	Yes	Yes	Detention until peace, then banishment.	Yes
fr:Pierre-Jean-Baptiste Auguis	Yes	No	Imprisonment during the war and banishment after peace on pain of death.	Yes
fr:Gaspard Severin Duchastel	Sick	Sick	Banishment (vote accepted despite his late arrival after voting was complete).	Sick
fr:Pierre Dubreüil-Chambardel	Yes	No	Death	No
fr: Louis Prosper Lofficial	Yes	Yes	Detention during the war and deportation after peace.	Yes
Charles Cochon de Lapparent	Yes	No	Death	No

=== Somme ===
13 députés and 4 substitutes

Députés	Is Louis Capet guilty of conspiracy against public liberty and attacks against the general security of the State?	Should the judgment of the National Convention against Louis Capet be submitted for ratification by the people?	What punishment should be imposed on Louis?	Should there be a reprieve of the judgment against Louis Capet?
fr: Jean-Baptiste Michel Saladin	Yes	No	Death	No
fr: Louis de Rivery	Yes	Yes	Detention.	Yes
fr:Jean-François Gantois	Yes	Yes	Detention until the end of the war and banishment after peace.	Yes
André Dumont	Yes	No	Death	No
fr:Eustache-Benoît Asselin	Yes	No	Detention during the war and deportation after peace.	Yes
fr:Charles-Antoine Hourier-Eloy	Yes	No	Death	No
fr: Pierre-Florent Louvet	Yes	Yes	Detention during the war and perpetual banishment after peace.	Yes
fr: Jean-François Dufestel	Yes	Yes	Detention during the war and banishment after peace.	Yes
fr: Jean-Baptiste Martin-Saint-Prix	Yes	Yes	Detention during the war and banishment after peace.	Yes
fr: Louis-Alexandre Devérité	Yes	Yes	Detention during the war and banishment when the motherland is safe.	Yes
fr: Jean-Baptiste Delecloy	Yes	Yes	Death with a reprieve until the signing of a peace, but the sentence should be carried out if the enemy appears at our frontiers.	Yes
fr:Charles Alexis Brûlart de Sillery	Yes	Yes	Detention during the war, then banishment in perpetuity after the consolidation of the Republic.	Yes
fr: Landry-François-Adrien François	Yes	Yes	Death	No

=== Tarn ===
9 députés and 3 substitutes

Députés	Is Louis Capet guilty of conspiracy against public liberty and attacks against the general security of the State?	Should the judgment of the National Convention against Louis Capet be submitted for ratification by the people?	What punishment should be imposed on Louis?	Should there be a reprieve of the judgment against Louis Capet?
Marc David Alba Lasource	en mission	en mission	Death	No
Jean-Pierre Lacombe-Saint-Michel	Yes	No	Death	No
fr: François Solomiac	Yes	No	Detention during the war and banishment after peace.	Yes
fr:Pierre Jean Louis Campmas	Yes	No	Death	No
fr: Pierre Stanislas Maruejouls	Yes	Yes	Detention during the war and deportation after peace.	Yes
fr: François Antoine Daubermesnil	Sick	Sick	Sick	Sick
fr:Jean-Paul Gouzy	Yes	Yes	Death with a reprieve until the Convention has determined the fate of the whole Bourbon family.	Yes
fr: Henri Pascal de Rochegude	Yes	Yes	Detention during the war and banishment after peace.	Yes
fr: Jean-Baptiste Meyer	Yes	Yes	Death	No

=== Var ===
8 députés and 4 substitutes

Députés	Is Louis Capet guilty of conspiracy against public liberty and attacks against the general security of the State?	Should the judgment of the National Convention against Louis Capet be submitted for ratification by the people?	What punishment should be imposed on Louis?	Should there be a reprieve of the judgment against Louis Capet?
fr: Jean-François Escudier	Yes	No	Death	Absent
fr: Joseph Charbonnier	Yes	No	Death	No
fr:Jean François Ricord	Yes	No	Death	No
Maximin Isnard	Yes	Yes	Death	No
Antoine Joseph Marie d'Espinassy	Yes	No	Death	No
fr: Jean Roubaud	Yes	No	Death	No
Charles-Louis Antiboul	Yes, justified	No	Detention, as a measure for general security.	Neither yes nor no
Paul Barras	Yes	No	Death	No

=== Vendée ===
9 députés and 3 substitutes

Députés	Is Louis Capet guilty of conspiracy against public liberty and attacks against the general security of the State?	Should the judgment of the National Convention against Louis Capet be submitted for ratification by the people?	What punishment should be imposed on Louis?	Should there be a reprieve of the judgment against Louis Capet?
fr: Jean-François Goupilleau	en mission	en mission	Death	No
fr: Philippe-Charles-Aimé Goupilleau	Yes	No	Death	No
fr: Joseph-Marie Gaudin	Yes, but not as a judge.	Yes	Detention during the war and exile after peace.	Yes
fr:François Maignen	Yes	No	Death	No
fr: Joseph-Pierre-Marie Fayau	Yes	No	Death	No
fr: Joseph-Mathurin Musset	Yes	No	Death	No
fr:Charles-François-Gabriel Morisson	Recused himself.	Recused himself.	Abstained	Abstained
fr: Charles-Jacques-Étienne Girard-Villars	Yes	No	Confinement during the war and banishment after peace, on pain of death.	Yes
fr:Louis-Julien Garos	Yes	No	Death	No

=== Vienne ===
8 députés and 2 substitutes

Députés	Is Louis Capet guilty of conspiracy against public liberty and attacks against the general security of the State?	Should the judgment of the National Convention against Louis Capet be submitted for ratification by the people?	What punishment should be imposed on Louis?	Should there be a reprieve of the judgment against Louis Capet?
fr:Pierre-François Piorry	Yes	No	Death	No
fr:François Pierre Ingrand	Yes	No	Death	No
fr: Jean-Félix Dutrou de Bornier	Yes	Yes	Confinement during the war and banishment after peace.	Yes
fr:Louis-Charles Martineau	Yes	No	Death	No
fr: Jean-Marie Bion	Yes	Yes	Detention during the war and banishment after peace.	Yes
Jacques Antoine Creuzé-Latouche	Yes	Yes	Detention until peace, then perpetual banishment.	Yes
Antoine Claire Thibaudeau	Yes	No, justified	Death	No
fr:Michel-Pascal Creuzé-Dufresne	Yes	Yes	Confinement during the war and banishment after peace.	Yes

=== Haute-Vienne ===
7 députés and 3 substitutes

Députés	Is Louis Capet guilty of conspiracy against public liberty and attacks against the general security of the State?	Should the judgment of the National Convention against Louis Capet be submitted for ratification by the people?	What punishment should be imposed on Louis?	Should there be a reprieve of the judgment against Louis Capet?
fr: Jean-Michel Lacroix	Yes	Abstained	Detention during the war and banishment after peace.	Yes
fr:Benoît Lesterpt-Beauvais	Yes	No	Death with a reprieve until the time when enemies invade on our territory; if peace is agreed, then until a time determined by the National Convention or the legislative body.	Yes
fr: Pardoux Bordas	Yes	No	Perpetual confinement.	No
fr: Léonard Honoré Gay de Vernon	Yes	No	Death	No
fr: Gabriel Faye	Yes	Yes	Detention during the war and banishment after peace.	Yes
fr: François Rivaud du Vignaud	Yes	Yes	Confinement during the war and banishment after peace.	Yes
fr: Jean-Baptiste Soulignac	Yes	Yes	Detention during the war and perpetual banishment after peace, on pain of death.	Yes

=== Vosges ===
8 députés and 4 substitutes

Députés	Is Louis Capet guilty of conspiracy against public liberty and attacks against the general security of the State?	Should the judgment of the National Convention against Louis Capet be submitted for ratification by the people?	What punishment should be imposed on Louis?	Should there be a reprieve of the judgment against Louis Capet?
fr:Joseph Clément Poullain de Grandprey	Yes	Yes	Death with a reprieve until the Constitution has been accepted by the people, and the Bourbon family has removed itself from the soil of liberty, unless French territory is invaded by foreign troops.	Yes
fr:Joseph Hugo	Sick	Sick	Sick	Sick
fr:Jean-Baptiste Perrin des Vosges	Yes	No	Death	No
fr:Jean-Baptiste Noël	Abstained	Recused himself	Recused himself	Recused himself
fr:Joseph Julien Souhait	Yes	Yes	Death with the Mailhe amendment.	Yes
fr:Jean-Baptiste-Marie-François Bresson	Yes	Yes	Detention until such time as public calm will allow him to be banished.	Yes
fr:François Couhey	Yes	Yes	Detention and exile after three years of peace, with a prohibition on returning to France, on pain of death.	Yes
fr:Charles-André Balland	Yes	Yes	Detention, if not perpetual banishment on condition of an advantageous peace, or of pronouncing his death if the sovereign people or some particular circumstances require it.	Yes

=== Yonne ===
9 députés and 3 substitutes

Députés	Is Louis Capet guilty of conspiracy against public liberty and attacks against the general security of the State?	Should the judgment of the National Convention against Louis Capet be submitted for ratification by the people?	What punishment should be imposed on Louis?	Should there be a reprieve of the judgment against Louis Capet?
fr:Nicolas Maure	Yes	No	Death	No
Louis-Michel Lepeletier de Saint-Fargeau	Yes	No	Death	No
fr:Louis Turreau	Yes	No	Death	No
fr:Jacques Boilleau	Yes	No	Death	No
fr:Jean Précy	Yes	Yes	Death with a reprieve until the ratification of the Constitution.	Yes
Pierre Bourbotte	Yes	No, justified	Death	No
fr:Jean-Baptiste Hérard	Yes	Yes	Death	No
fr:Étienne Finot	Yes	No	Death	No
fr:Jean Claude Chastellain	Yes	Yes	Detention during the war and banishment after peace.	Yes

== Results ==
=== First question ===
- Is Louis Capet guilty of conspiracy against public liberty and attacks against the general security of the State, yes or no?
- Number of députés in the Convention: 749

Absent
Reason	Number
Sickness	7
No known reason	1
En mission	20
Not appearing on any list	3
Total absent	31

Present
Votes	Number
Simply answered "yes"	683
Made various declarations	32
Did not answer the question asked	3
Total votes	708

=== Second question ===
- Should the judgment of the National Convention against Louis Capet be submitted for ratification by the people, yes or no?
- Number of députés in the Convention = 749; absolute majority of those voting (not absent, abstaining or recusing themselves) = 355

Absent
Reason	Number
Sickness	7
No known reason	1
En mission	20
Total absent	28

Present
Votes	Number	Of which justified their opinion
Yes	286	109
No	423	116
Total votes	709	
Abstained or recused themselves	12	

=== Third question ===
- What punishment should be imposed on Louis?
- Number of députés in the Convention = 749; absolute majority of those voting (not absent, abstaining or recusing themselves) = 361

Absent
Reason	Number
Sickness	7
No known reason	1
En mission	15
Total absent	23

Present
Votes	Number
Death without conditions	361
Death with the Mailhe amendment	26
Death with reprieve	44
Voted for other punishments	290
Total votes	721
Abstained or recused themselves	5

Note: During the session on Friday January 18, Gasparin and Delacroix reported errors “in the statement of the decree issued yesterday”. After checking, it turned out that the number of voters and the absolute majority remained the same, but that the votes of the 26 deputies who had voted for death with the Mailhe amendment ought to have been counted as voting unconditionally for death. The number of deputies who voted for unconditional death was therefore 387.

=== Fourth question ===
- Should there be a reprieve of the judgment against Louis Capet, yes or no?
- Number of députés in the Convention = 749; absolute majority of those voting (not absent, abstaining or recusing themselves) = 347

Absent
Reason	Number
Resigned	1
Sickness	21
No known reason	8
En mission	17
Total absent	47

Present
Votes	Number
Yes	310
No	380
Voted for some conditions	2
Total votes	692
Abstained or recused themselves	10
