= List of representatives on mission =

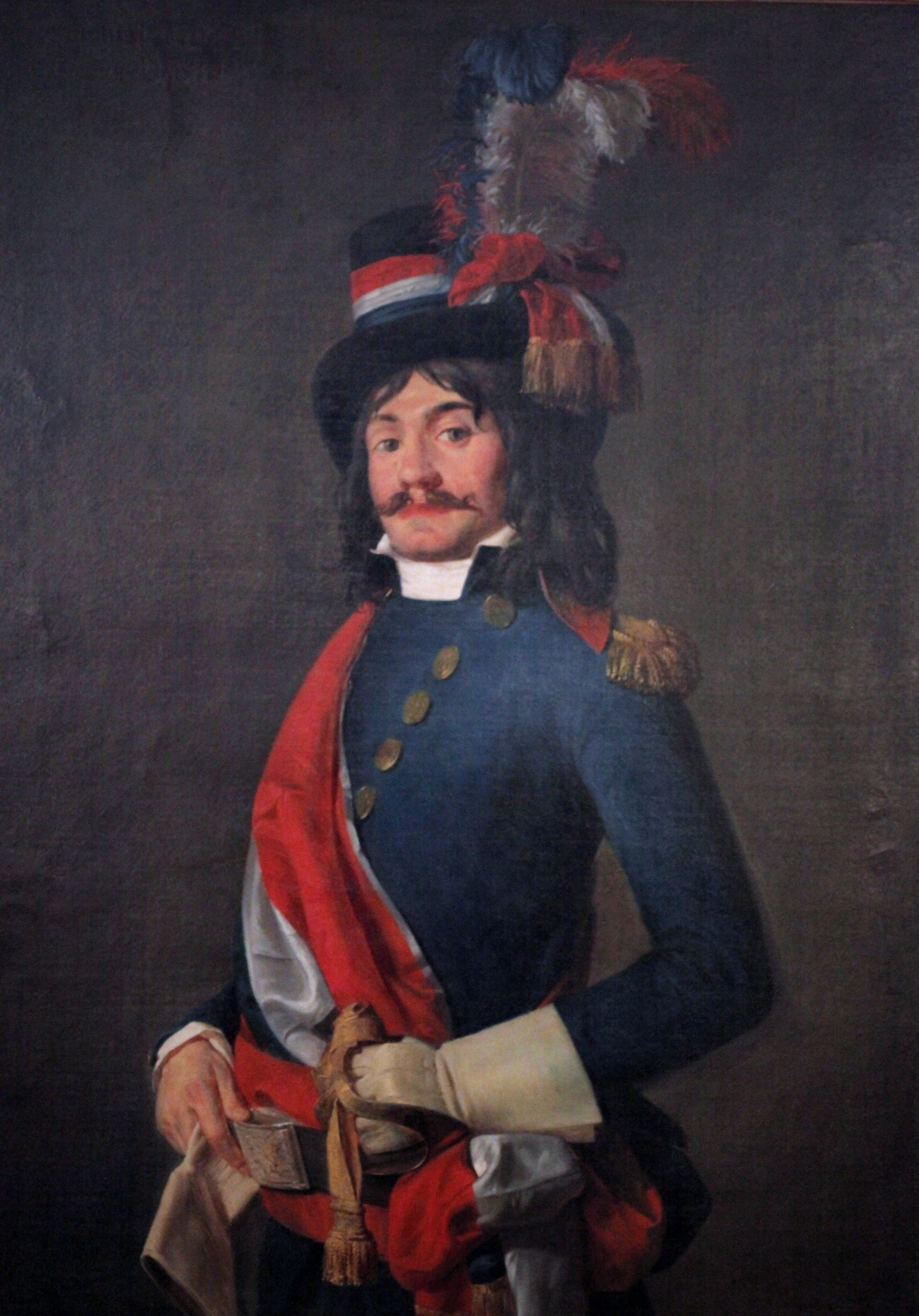
Jean-Baptiste Milhaud as a représentant en mission

During the French Revolution (1789–1799 or 1815), a représentant en mission (English: representative on mission) was an extraordinary envoy of the Legislative Assembly. The term is most often assigned to deputies designated by the National Convention for maintaining law and order in the départements and armies. They had powers to oversee conscription into the army and to monitor both local military command and local compliance with Revolutionary agendas.

Such inspectors had existed in some form under the Ancien Régime, but the position was systematized during the Reign of Terror and the representatives were given absolute power. Some of them abused their powers and exercised a veritable dictatorship at a local level.

== Alphabetical list of names ==
=== Alphabetical list of names A–B ===
Name	Dates and Actions	Image
Antoine Louis Albitte	Dieppe, 30 December 1761 – 23 or 25 December 1812, Lithuania died during retreat from Russia of fatigue and hunger.	
fr:Pierre-Jean Baptiste Aiuguis		
Paul Barras	30 June 1755 – 29 January 1829	
Jean Bassal	3 May 1802	
Pierre-Louis Bentabole	4 June 1756–22 April 1798	
André Antoine Bernard	19 October 1818, Funchal, Madeira (Spain). Also called Bernard de Saintes, Bernard de Xantes, André Antoine Bernard de Jeuzines, and Pioche-fer Bernard	
fr:Claud Blad		
fr:Jean-Baptiste Bô		
Pierre Bourbotte	5 June 1763, Vault-de-Lugny – 17 June 1795, Paris. Guillotined.	
Leonard Bourdon	6 November 1754, Alençon – 29 May 1807, Breslau	
fr:Henri Gaspard Charles Bouret		
Jean François Boursault-Malherbe		
Jacques Brival	1751–1820	

=== Alphabetical list of names C–F ===
Name	Dates and Actions	Image
Paul Cadroy See also fr:Paul Cadroy		
Jean-Baptiste Carrier	1756 – 16 December 1794; slaughtered thousands as a representative; guillotined	
Jean-Baptiste Cavaignac	0 January 1763 – 24 March 1829	
Guillaume Chaudron-Rousseau See also fr:Guillaume Chaudron-Rousseau		
Charles Cochon de Lapparent	24 January 1750 – 17 July 1825	
Jean-Marie Collot d'Herbois	19 June 1749 – 8 June 1796; executed more than 2,000 in the city of Lyon while a representative on mission Deported in 1795 to French Guiana, where he died of Yellow Fever.	
Georges Couthon	(22 December 1755 – 28 July 1794 radical, colleague with Robespierre and de Saint-Just; influential in development of Law of 22 Prairial, which increased the rate at which accused counter-revolutionaries were executed; Guillotined with Robespierre.	
Joseph-Marie Cusset See also fr:Joseph-Marie Cusset		
Georges Frédéric Dentzel See also fr:Georges Frédéric Dentzel		
Edmond Louis Alexis Dubois-Crancé		
fr:Antoine Dubois de Bellegarde		
fr:Louis Dubois du Bais		
André Dumont See also André Dumont		
Ernest Dominique François Joseph Duquesnoy	17 May 1749, Bouvigny-Boyeffles - 17 June 1795, Paris; Suicide, although condemned to guillotine.	
Jean-François Escudier See also fr:Jean-François Escudier		
François Joachim Esnue-Lavallée See also fr:François Joachim Esnue-Lavallée		
Claude Dominique Côme Fabre See also fr:Claude Dominique Côme Fabre		
Gilbert-Amable Faure		
fr:Joseph-Pierre-Marie Fayau		
Joseph Fouché also called 1st Duke of Otranto	21 May 1759 at Le Pellerin, near Nantes, France – 25 December 1820 at Trieste	
fr:André Foussedoire		
fr:Marie Pierre Adrien Francastel		
fr:René François-Primaudière		
Louis Marie Stanislas Fréron	17 August 1754 – 15 July 1802	

=== Alphabetical list of names G–L ===
Name	Dates and Actions	Image
fr:Jacques Garnier de Saintes	1817 or 1818 in Ohio (US)	
Thomas-Augustin de Gasparin	7 November 1793, general of brigade	
fr:Raymond Gaston	8 September 1836, Paris,	
fr:Joseph-Marie Gaudin	21 August 1818	
fr:Antoine-François Gauthier des Orcières	1838	
Pierre-Mathurin Gillet	4 November 1795	
fr:Jean-Baptiste Girot-Pouzol		
Jean-Marie Claude Alexandre Goujon	17 June 1795, suicide before execution	
fr:Jean François Marie Goupilleau de Fontenay	11 October 1823, Montaigu, Vendée cousin, below	
fr:Philippe Charles Aimé Goupilleau de Montaigu	1 July 1823, Montaigu, Vendée	
fr:Jacques Tanguy Marie Guermeur	15 September 1798 Quimper (Brittany)	
fr:Mathieu Guezno		
fr:Jean Guimberteau		
fr:Louis Guyardin		
Nicolas Hentz	5 June 1753, Metz – after 1829 possibly near Wilkes-Barre, Pennsylvania	
fr:Charles-Antoine Hourier-Eloy		
fr:Marc-Antoine Huguet		
fr:Claude Javogues		
Jeanbon Saint-André		
fr:Julien-Urbain-François-Marie-Riel Lefebvre de La Chauvière		
fr:Antoine-Joseph Lanot	15 February 1839, Paris	
fr:Jacques Léonard Laplanche		
François Sébastien Christophe Laporte		
Joseph Le Bon	29 September 1765 – 10 October 1795; Condemned to death for abuse of his power as a representative on mission.	
fr:Joseph-François Le Malliaud de Kerharnos	6 January 1830 at Vannes	
Philippe-François-Joseph Le Bas	28 July 1794, Paris. Committed suicide (pistol) prior to arrests on 9 Thermidor	
fr:Jean-Alban Lefiot		
fr:Sylvain-Phalier Lejeune	7 February 1827 at Saint-Josse-ten-Noode	

=== Alphabetical list of names M–Z ===
Name	Dates and Actions	Image
Étienne Christophe Maignet	22 October 1834	
fr:Nicolas Maure		
fr:Jean Nicolas Méaulle		
fr:Henri Menuau		
Philippe-Antoine Merlin de Douai	26 December 1838	
fr:Jean-Marie François Merlino		
fr:Jean-Baptiste Michaud		
Jean-Baptiste Milhaud	8 January 1833	
fr:Jean-Baptiste-Benoît Monestier		
fr:Pierre-Laurent Monestier		
fr:Joseph-Mathurin Musset		
fr:Jean-Baptiste Perrin des Vosges		
fr:Jean-Pascal Charles de Peyssard		
fr:Jean-Adam Pflieger, l'aîné		
Pierre Philippeaux		
fr:André Pomme		
fr:François-Martin Poultier		
Claude-Antoine Prieur-Duvernois		
Pierre-Louis Prieur		
Joseph-Étienne Richard		
Augustin Robespierre		
fr:Pierre Roux-Fazillac		
Louis Félix Roux		
Stanislas Joseph François Xavier Rovère		
fr:Alexandre-Jean Ruault		
fr:Albert Ruelle		
Louis Antoine de Saint-Just		
fr:Jean-Baptiste Michel Saladin		
Claude François Bruno Siblot		
fr:Michel-Louis Talot		
fr:Didier Thirion		
fr:Jean-Nicolas Topsent		
Jean-Baptiste Treilhard		
fr:Narcisse Trullard		
fr:Étienne Vidalin		
fr:François-Toussaint Villers		
Jean-Henri Voulland		
