= Louis François Peyre =

French politician (1760–1828)

Louis François Peyre (14 March 1760 - 2 September 1828) was a French politician, elected as a deputy to the National Convention in September 1792.

== Life ==
He was born in Mane, Alpes-de-Haute-Provence,. His father emancipated him so he could go to trade in Martinique.

He was elected mayor of Mane in 1790, then elected to the departmental assembly, being elected its president for 1791–1792. He was then elected to the convention, where he sided with the Girondins. During the trial of Louis XVI he voted for death without reprieve but requiring the people's ratification. On 6 June 1793 he signed the Girondins' protest and was one of the 73 deputies that were ordered to be arrested, only saving his head by retracting. Whilst in prison he had epileptic fits and he only rejoined the Convention in December 1794.

In June 1795 he was sent as a représentant en mission to the Army of the Rhine then the Army of Italy with Marius Félix Maïsse. He was finally elected to the Council of 500, leaving it in 1799 and retiring completely from politics. He died in Paris 29 years later.

== Bibliography (in French) ==
- Notice biographique de l’Assemblée nationale, , accessed 28 March 2008
- Jean-Bernard Lacroix, notice biographique, La Révolution dans les Basses-Alpes, Annales de Haute-Provence, bulletin de la société scientifique et littéraire des Alpes-de-Haute-Provence, no 307, 1er trimestre 1989, 108e année, p. 101
- "Louis François Peyre", in Adolphe Robert and Gaston Cougny, Dictionnaire des parlementaires français (1789-1891), Bourloton, Paris, 1889 Edition details Wikisource, online , accessed 28 March 2008
