= Jean Bassal =

- Born: 9 December 1753; Béziers, Languedoc, France
- Died: 5 April 1802 (aged 48); Paris, France
- Occupation: Priest
- Political party: Jacobin Club; Montagnards

Jean Bassal, 12 September 1752, Béziers – 3 May 1802, Paris, was a French Deputy, a Vincentian, and a revolutionary during the French Revolution. With other representatives on mission he sought to quell federalist impulses in the French provinces and to align the local Jacobin clubs with the Parisian model. As an aide to the famed Championnet he attempted the geographic and political reorganization of the Kingdom of Naples along republican lines.

== Biography ==
Member of the Congregation of the Mission before 1789 and vicar of Notre-Dame de Paris, he took part in the outbreak of the French Revolution. After the members of the Third Estate were locked out of the Estates-General on 20 June 1789, they met in the St. Louis district of Versailles, where he was among the first to take the Tennis Court Oath. As a juring priest, he was named to the parish of St. Louis (Versailles) on 10 April 1790; to the Executive Board of the department on 6 July 1790, and Vice President of the district in 1791. On 3 September 1791, he was elected with 299 votes out of 553 voters, as deputy of Seine-et-Oise to the Legislative Assembly, where he displayed his radical opinions. Reelected to the convention, he voted for the death without appeal or suspension, during the trial of Louis XVI.

Bassal was named with Jacques Garnier de Saintes on the first mission in the Jura, the Ain, the Côte d'Or and Doubs by decree of 18 June 1793, to quell unrest and purify the authorities. His action in Doubs reflected the broader problems of federalism and the revolutionary agenda: as late as May 1793, neither of the two blocs of the Jacobin clubs in Doubs had identified their interests clearly with a Parisian faction. Once Bassal and his colleague Garnier arrived in Benscaon, they influenced one of the clubs to declare itself aligned with the Parisian Jacobins, "for the Mountain," as the saying went, and acquired the mantle of power. This process repeated itself in the Jura, the Ain, and the Côte d'Or. Upon his return, he was elected secretary of the meeting. Then he was sent with Charles-Jean-Marie Alquier, Bernard de Saintes and Jacques Reverchon, mission Ain, Jura, Côte d'Or, the Mont-Terrible and Haute-Saône by decree of 17 August 1793, to quell the royalist uprisings there and to secure the borders with Switzerland and German states.

Appointed at the beginning of Directory as a secret agent in Basel, his mission was to ensure supplies of the army of Italy and monitor those suspected of not having denounced the counter revolution in Switzerland and remained in regular correspondence with one of the leaders (known as the Master, probably William Wickham) of the royalist insurrection of 13 Vendemiaire Year IV. As secretary to the Directory's Consul in Basel, he was reported to have spied upon English agents in Switzerland. Bassal was also charged as a government commissioner to inspect the post offices of the border with Switzerland (Huningue, Porrentruy, Besançon, Pontarlier, St. Claude and Versoix).

== Reform of Naples ==
In 1798, he went to Naples with Championnet. There, he sought to take charge of the reform of the departments, reorganizing the elective and governmental landscape in the French model. The Neopolitans objected to his seemingly arbitrary organizational methods. Bassal's project threw existing hierarchies into confusion, and became an unworkable disaster. These measures were part of broader efforts taken to secure the revolution in the Kingdom of Naples along the republican lines established in France, which included guaranteeing the national debt. However, he was accused of causing trouble between the civilian and military commissioners and of seeking to benefit from the squander of public funds. Subsequently, he returned to Milan when Championnet was recalled to Paris. Napoleon's coup of 30 Prairial Year VII (18 June 1799) saved him from further prosecution. He retired to Paris, where he died in 1802 in obscurity.
