= Brice Gertoux =

French politician

- Born: 13 May 1744; Ancizan
- Died: 25 January 1812 (aged 67); Campan
- Position held: Member of the Council of Five Hundred

Brice Gertoux (born May 13, 1744, in Ancizan (Hautes-Pyrénées) and died on January 25, 1812) was a French politician in Campan (Hautes-Pyrénées).

== Biography ==
Lawyer in Tarbes, he was deputy of the Hautes-Pyrénées from 1791 to 1798. He voted for the imprisonment of Louis XVI and was elected to the Council of Five Hundred on 22 Vendémiaire year IV. He left this assembly in the year VII.

== Sources ==
- Robert, Adolphe; Cougny, Gaston (1981). "Brice Gertoux". In Bourloton, Edgar (ed.). Dictionnaire des Parlementaires Français comprenant tous les membres des Assemblées Françaises et tous les Ministres Français depuis le 1er mai 1789 jusqu'au 1er mai 1889. 1889-1891.
