= Joseph-Étienne Richard =

French politician

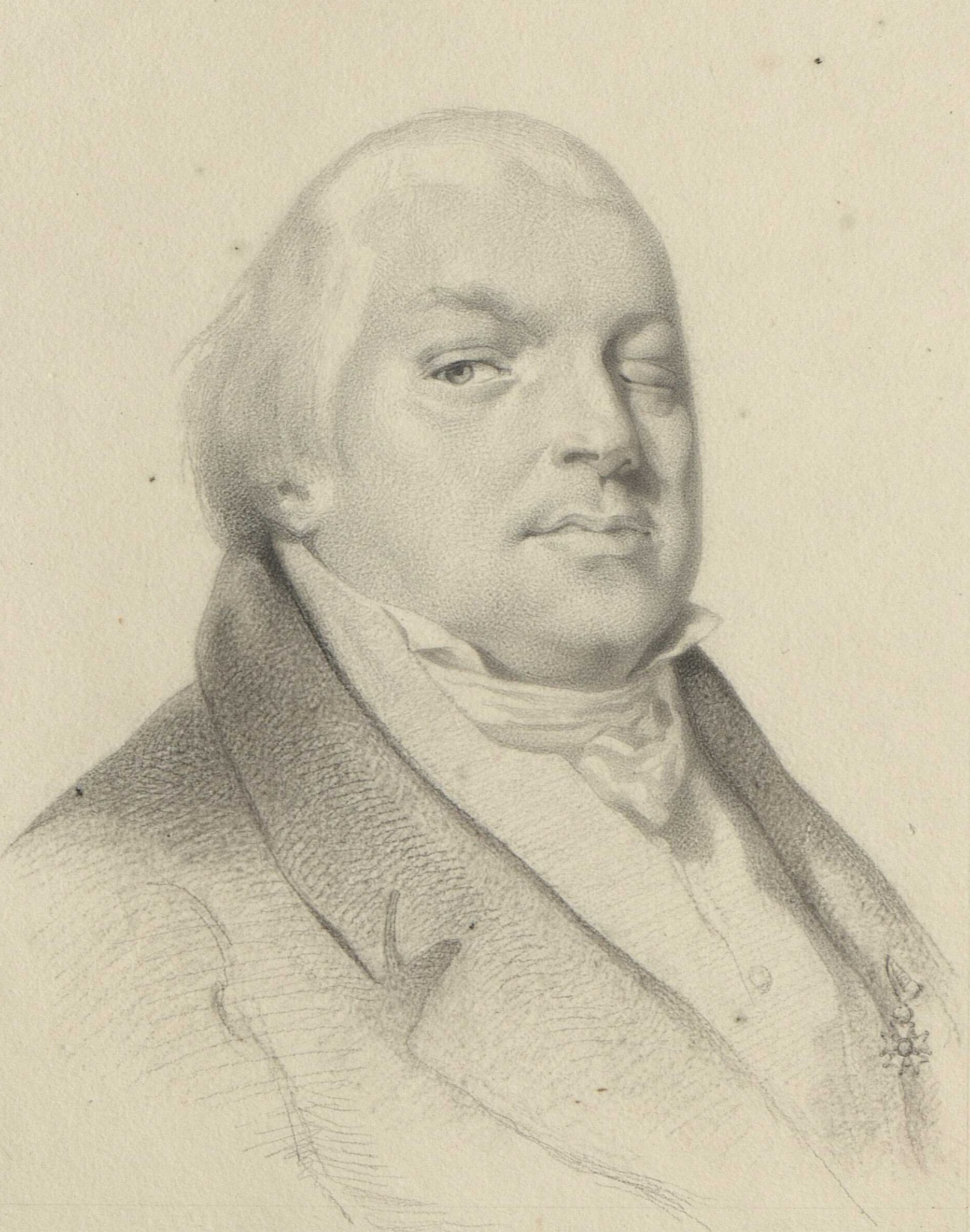
Joseph-Étienne Richard

Joseph-Étienne Richard (known as 'Richard de la Sarthe') (28 September 1761 La Flèche - 17 August 1834 Saintes), was a French politician.

== Under the Republic ==
Before the French Revolution he was admitted to the bar in 1788 and in 1790 was elected 'procureur syndic' of the commune of La Flèche, later becoming its public prosecutor.

On 4 September 1791, he was elected député for Sarthe to the Legislative Assembly, the seventh of ten elected, with 248 votes from 346 voters. On 3 September 1792 he was re-elected to the National Convention, this time at the head of the list, with a plurality of votes. At the trial of Louis XVI he voted for the king’s death.

He was first sent as a représentant en mission to Sarthe and Maine-et-Loire where he took part in several victories over the Vendée rebels, establishing the first military commission (16 June 1793) and surveillance committee (18 October 1793) at Tours. On his return to Paris he was named secretary to the Convention.

Two months later he was sent as a représentant on mission again, this time to the Army of the North. He worked with the generals to restore discipline and gave the order that English soldiers in the garrisons of Ypres and Nieuport were to be treated as prisoners of war. He was still on mission at the time of the Thermidorean reaction and took no part in it. However on his return to Paris he was elected to the Committee of Public Safety in late 1794 and supported measures against the Jacobins; he was at the head of the troops who cleared the chamber of the Jacobin Club. Elected once again to the Council of Five Hundred, he retained his seat until 1797 and supported the Coup of 18 Brumaire.

In 1795 he was sent once again to the Army of the North, where he freed a large number of émigrés who were due to be tried by a military commission at Breda. He also negotiated an agreement with the Batavian Republic whereby the Dutch agreed to maintain 25,000 French troops on their soil. In 1797 he was appointed to a senio post in the War Ministry.

== Under Napoleon and Louis XVIII ==
He was appointed préfet of Haute-Garonne on 7 Germinal Year VIII (28 March 1800) and held this post until 4 April 1806, then becoming préfet of Charente-Inférieure (1806-1814, 1815). In 1808 he was elected to the Académie des belles-lettres, sciences et arts de La Rochelle. Napoleon I awarded him the Legion of Honour on 25 prairial Year XII (14 June 1804), then granted him the titles first of chevalier de l'Empire on 18 June 1809, and then baron de l'Empire on 9 March 1810.

Under the Bourbon Restoration he was dismissed but soon recalled and appointed préfet of Calvados in 1815. He resigned again in 1816 when the law of 12 January 1816 proscribing regicides was passed, but he retired quietly to Saintes and no action was taken against him. As well as being exempted from the provisions of this law, the government granted him a pension of 6.000 francs.
