= Charles Cochon de Lapparent =

French politician (1750–1825)

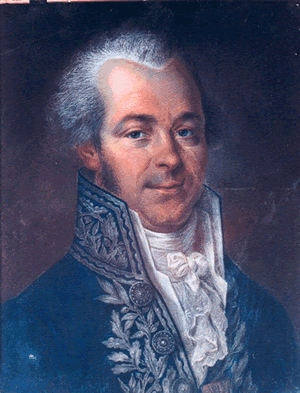

Minister of Police
- In office 3 April 1796 – 16 July 1797

Personal details
- Born: 24 January 1750; Champdeniers-Saint-Denis, Kingdom of France
- Died: 17 July 1825 (aged 75); Poitiers, Kingdom of France

Charles Cochon Lapparent (24 January 1750 – 17 July 1825) was a French politician and Minister of Police.

== Biography ==
He was born 24 January 1750 in Champdeniers-Saint-Denis.

He was born into a bourgeois family that was formerly Protestant, a religion they were required to recant. Lapparent was elected deputy of the Third Estate, and he held important functions in the National Convention, in the armies of the Republic and the committee of public health. On 9 Thermidor, he participated in the fall of Robespierre. During a meeting of the French Directory he was appointed minister of police. However, he was accused of being royalist and deported. During the time of the Consulate and the First French Empire, he held important posts, but in 1815 he was forced to leave France, being allowed to return to Poitiers after a year of exile.

He died 17 July 1825 in Poitiers.
