= Claude François Bruno Siblot =

French physician and legislator

Member of the Legislative Assembly of France
- In office August 29, 1791 – September 20, 1792
- Constituency: Haute-Saone

Mayor of Lure, Haute-Saône
- In office 1788–1790

Personal details
- Born: October 6, 1752 Lure, Haute-Saône
- Died: October 20, 1801 (aged 49) Lure, Haute-Saône
- Occupation: Politician, physician

Claude François Bruno Siblot (6 October 1752 – 20 October 1801) was a French physician and member of the Legislative Assembly.

He was a member of the Legislative Assembly from August 29, 1791 to September 20, 1792 representing Haute-Saone.

== Biography ==
He worked as a physician in Lure, Haute-Saône before the French Revolution, and was mayor there from 1788 to 1790.
