= André Antoine Bernard =

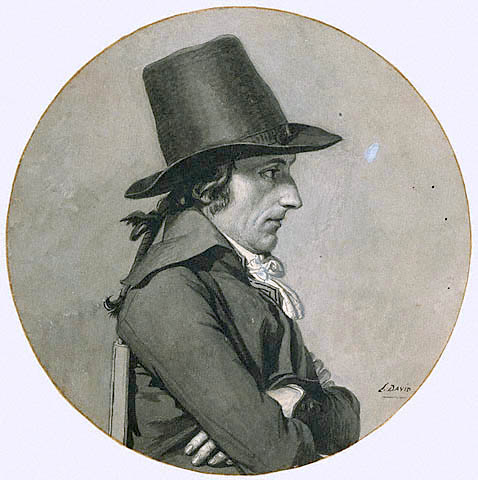
- Portrait of André Antoine Bernard, pen-and-ink by Jacques-Louis David, July 1795 (Getty Museum)

50th President of the National Convention
- In office 2–22 September 1794
- Preceded by: Antoine Merlin de Thionville
- Succeeded by: André Dumont

Personal details
- Born: 21 June 1751 Corme-Royal, County of Saintonge, Kingdom of France
- Died: 19 October 1818 (aged 67) Funchal (Madeira Island)
- Party: The Mountain

André Antoine Bernard (21 June 1751 – 19 October 1818) called Bernard de Saintes, was a French lawyer and revolutionary, one of the Jacobins responsible for the Reign of Terror in the French Revolution.

== Names ==
Bernard was a man of many names. Originally André Antoine Bernard, before the Revolution he added the name of a small property his family owned and became André Antoine Bernard de Jeuzines. Later he was called Bernard de Saintes, since he represented Saintes in the Legislative Assembly, but he disliked that and changed it to Bernard de Xantes, which looked less religious. Later, he called himself Pioche-fer Bernard, or Pick-axe Bernard. In the French revolutionary calendar, adopted in 1793, Bernard's name-day (30 November, for Saint Andrew) fell on the tenth day of Frimaire, and marked the Festival of the Iron Pick-axe. He liked the connection and changed his first name accordingly.

== Career ==
Bernard trained as a lawyer at the town of Saintes and became one of the 'new men' of 1789. He represented Saintes in the Legislative Assembly which sat from October, 1791, until September 1792, and then was a member from Charente-Maritime of the National Convention (20 September 1792, to 26 October 1795). Becoming a Jacobin, he was among those responsible for the Reign of Terror. In 1793 and 1794, he became notorious in the Haute-Saône and the Côte-d'Or for arresting suspected "enemies of the people", sending them to the revolutionary tribunal and the guillotine.

Bernard is also credited with integrating the Duchy of Montbéliard, previously a possession of Württemberg, into France. As a representative of the convention, he informed the municipal authorities: "Je vous apporte la liberté... j'ai des canons avec moi" (I bring you liberty... I have cannons with me). Four days later, a guillotine was erected on the square of St Martin in Montbéliard.

The convention had a rolling presidency, so he held the title of President of the National Convention for three weeks in September 1794. When the revolutionary government was overthrown, he was imprisoned with many others, but was not among those executed.

Under the French Empire, Bernard settled in Saintonge, where he worked as a criminal lawyer. In 1816, he was among those exiled from France as one of the regicides of King Louis XVI, and settled first in Belgium, where he established a new pro-democracy periodical, Le Surveillant. Soon expelled by the Dutch authorities then in control of Belgium, he took ship for the United States but was shipwrecked at Madeira. He died there at Funchal in 1818. The local church refused him a Christian funeral, so his remains were buried at sea.

Bernard's portrait in pen and ink by Jacques-Louis David, done when they were in prison together at the Collèdes Quatre Nations, Paris, in July 1795) is in the Getty Museum.

== See also ==
- Liste des membres de la Convention nationale par département (in French)
- Liste des présidents de la Convention nationale (in French)
