= Représentant en mission =

Political and military position during the French Revolution

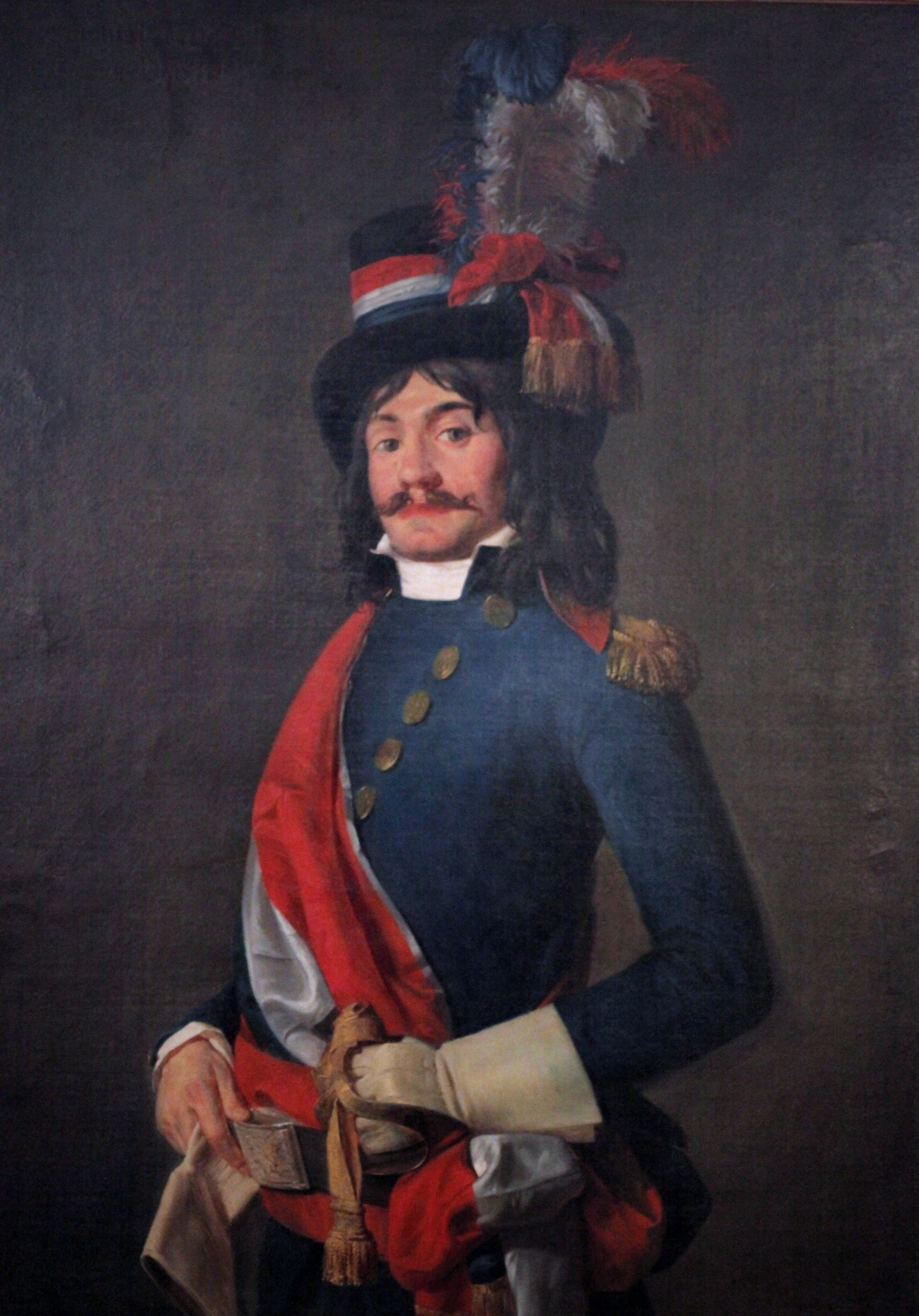
Jean-Baptiste Milhaud as a représentant en mission

During the French Revolution, a représentant en mission (French pronunciation: [ʁəpʁezɑ̃tɑ̃ ɑ̃ misjɔ̃]; English: representative on mission) was an extraordinary envoy of the Legislative Assembly (1791–92) and its successor, the National Convention (1792–1795). The term is most often assigned to deputies designated by the National Convention for maintaining law and order in the départements and armies, as they had powers to oversee conscription into the army, and were used to monitor local military command. At the time France was in crisis; not only was war going badly, as French forces were being pushed out of Belgium, but there was also revolt in the Vendée over conscription into the army and resentment of the Civil Constitution of the Clergy.

Such inspectors had existed in some form under the Ancien Régime, but they were systematized during the Reign of Terror and given absolute power. Some of them abused their powers and exercised a veritable dictatorship at local levels.

Representatives on mission were also used in the more dramatic cases of urban revolts (seen as parts of a single movement, and labelled by the Parisians as "federalism") in cities such as Nantes, Toulouse, Lyon, Bordeaux and Marseille. Leaders in Paris saw these revolts as the work of royalists who had to be eliminated. The representatives on missions were usually sent out with "unlimited powers" to allow them to accomplish the monumental tasks they faced. Such authority was often abused, and the representatives frequently emerged as the most zealous proponents and executors (literally) of the Terror. A total of 82 deputies were sent to the provinces with the official purpose of letting people know why emergency measures were necessary and to coordinate those measures. In reality, the representatives' main responsibility was to check that the generals and officers were doing their utmost to achieve victory.

Examples of représentants en mission include Joseph Fouché, Louis-Marie Stanislas Fréron, Jean-Lambert Tallien, Jean-Baptiste Carrier, Étienne Christophe Maignet, Jean-Marie Collot d'Herbois and Georges Couthon in Lyon.

== See also ==
- List of representatives on mission

== Bibliography ==
- Roger Dupuy, Nouvelle histoire de la France contemporaine. Vol 2 : La République jacobine, Paris, Seuil, 2005, ISBN 2-02-039818-4
- Andrew Matthews, Revolution and Reaction: Europe 1789–1849, ISBN 0-521-56734-3.
