= Étienne Christophe Maignet =

French lawyer and politician

Étienne Christophe Maignet (Ambert, Puy-de-Dôme, 9 July 1758 – Ambert, 22 October 1834) was a French lawyer, politician and deputy to the National Convention.
