= François Hanriot =

French Sans-culotte leader

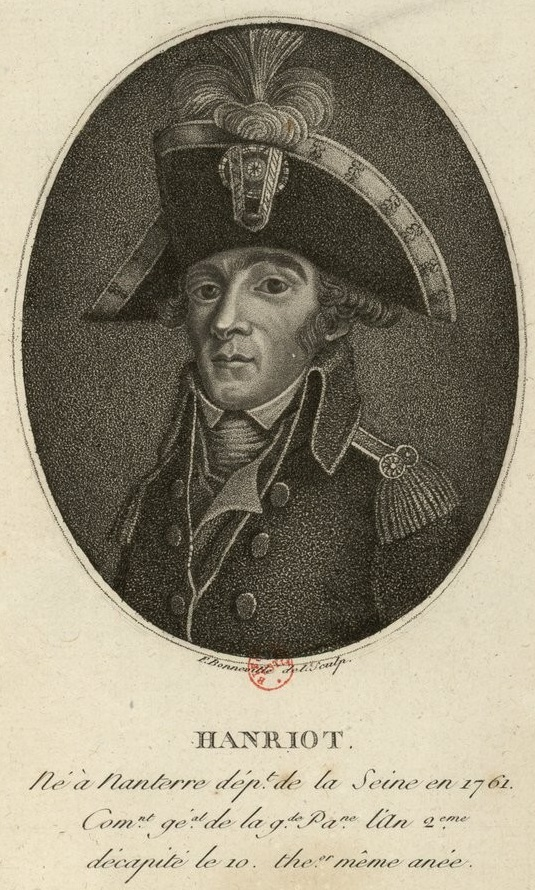
From 10 August 1792 François Hanriot was chef de la section des sans-culottes; Engraving of François Hanriot, engraving by François Bonneville

François Hanriot (English: /ɒ̃ˈriːoʊ/ ahn-REE-oh, French: [fʁɑ̃swa ɑ̃ʁjo]; 2 December 1759 – 28 July 1794) was a French Sans-culotte leader, street orator, and commander of the National Guard during the French Revolution. He played a vital role in the Insurrection of 31 May – 2 June 1793 and subsequently the fall of the Girondins. On 27 July 1794 he tried to release Maximilien Robespierre, who was arrested by the Convention. He was executed on the next day – together with Robespierre, Saint-Just, and Georges Couthon – by the rules of the law of 22 Prairial, only verifying his identity at the trial.

== Life ==
=== Early years ===
François Hanriot was born in Nanterre, now a western suburb of Paris. His parents were servants (gardeners) to a former Treasurer of France, and came from Sormery in Burgundy. Between 1779 and 1783 he supposedly was a soldier in America serving under Lafayette, but there are no documents to prove that.

Not a man of any specific profession, Hanriot held a variety of different jobs. He took his first employment with a procureur doing mostly secretarial work but lost his position due to dishonesty. Next, he obtained a clerkship in the Paris octroi in 1789, doing tax work. His position there was also ill-fated; he was dismissed after leaving his station on the night of 12 July 1789, when the popular Jacques Necker was fired, and angry Parisians attempted to burn down the building belonging to the Wall of the Ferme générale. Hanriot was arrested and imprisoned in Bicêtre and released the next year with the help of Jean-Paul Marat. After his string of unfortunate professions, Hanriot remained unemployed and subsequently very poor. His next string of occupations is rather hazy in history; many people of the time connect him to a variety of professions including shopkeeper, liquor-seller, and peddler. He lived near the Jardin des Plantes at 21, Rue de la Clef.

=== Role in the first years of the Revolution ===
After generating a more substantial fortune he moved around the corner to Rue du Battoir, now Rue de Quatrefages. In January 1792, Hanriot became well known for his anti-aristocratic outlook and for attacking Lafayette. He became an orator for the local section sans-culottes, one of the most populous and poorest districts of the capital. On 9 August 1792, when the Assembly refused to impeach Lafayette, the tocsin called the sections into arms. In the evening the "commissionaires" of several sections (Billaud-Varenne, Chaumette, Hébert, Hanriot, Fleuriot-Lescot, Pache, Bourdon) gathered in the town hall. The next day the Tuileries was stormed by the National Guard, the Fédérés and the people from the revolutionary sections of Paris.

As a member of the Cordeliers club he was strongly in favor of imposing taxes on the aristocracy, presenting them "with a bill in one hand and a pistol in the other." With this attitude he gained a loyal following of local sans-culottes and they would appoint him on 2 September as captain of the National Guard battalion of his section. It is unlikely he participated in the September Massacre as the Sainte-Pélagie Prison in his section was not visited at all. (Note: It is possible that his responsibility for the seminary Saint-Firmin massacre came from a confusion with a namesake, Humbert Henriot, a 32-year-old longshoreman.) The next evening he was present at Bicêtre with his battalion. According to Cassignac his men were involved in the massacre.

=== The Fall of the Girondists ===
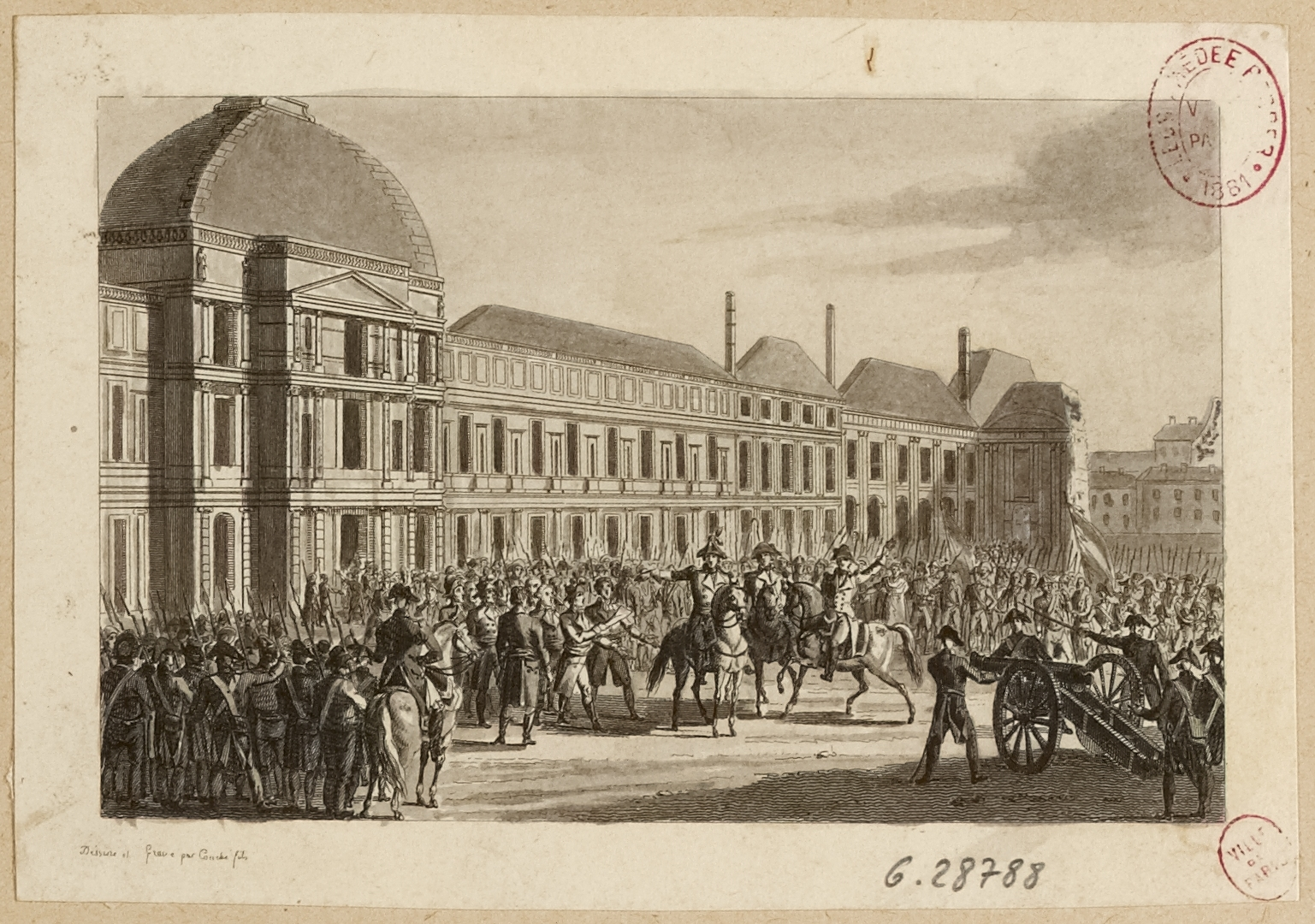
Journées des 31 Mai, 1er et 2 Juin 1793, an engraving of the Convention surrounded by National Guards, forcing the deputies to arrest the Girondins and to establish an armed force of 6,000 men. The insurrection was organized by the Paris Commune and supported by Montagnards.

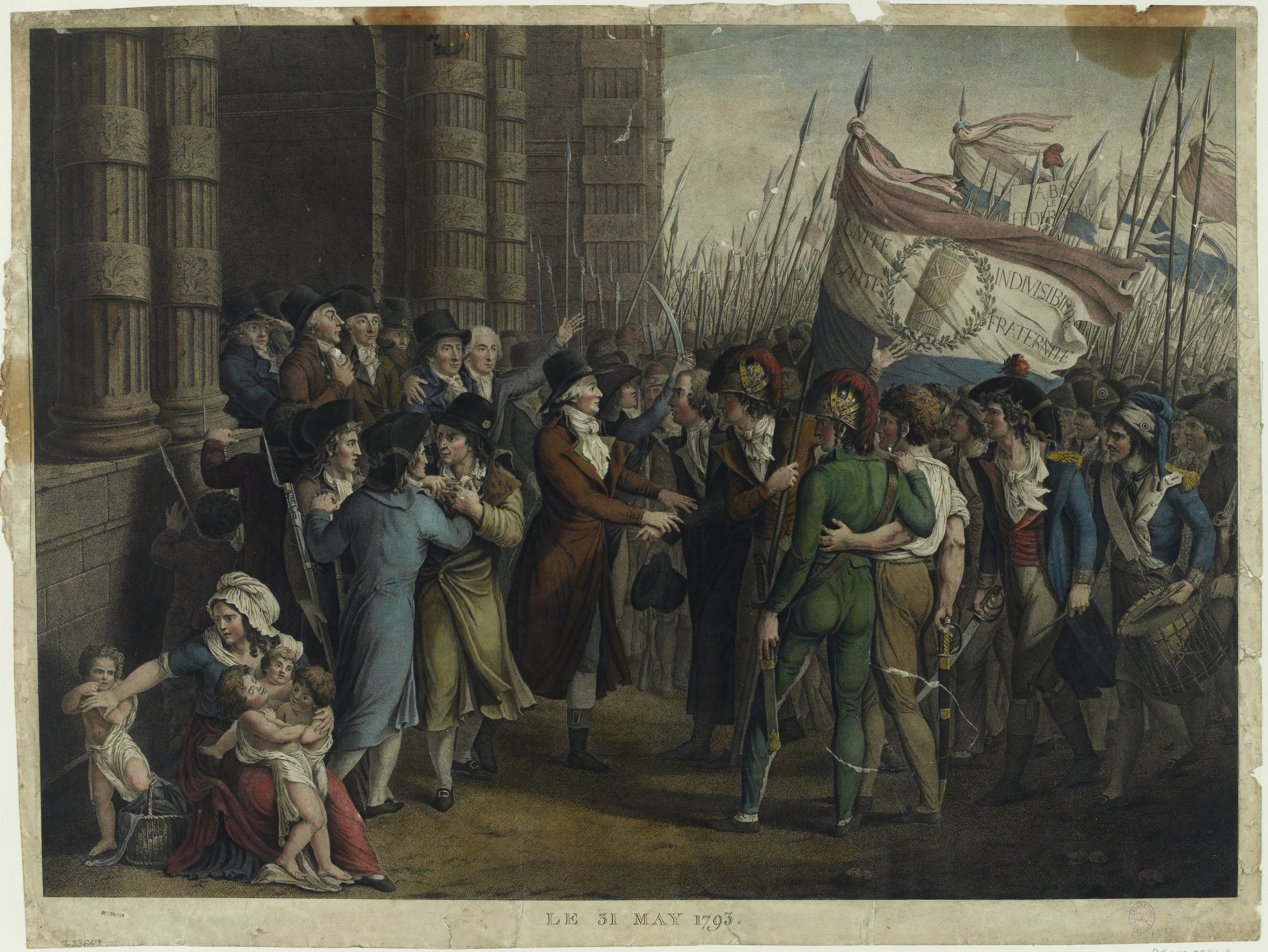
The uprising of the Parisian sans-culottes from 31 May to 2 June 1793. The scene takes place in front of the Deputies Chamber in the Tuileries. The depiction shows Marie-Jean Hérault de Séchelles and Pierre Victurnien Vergniaud.

The Spring of 1793 was a period of great political tension in Paris as the radical voices in the Commune and the Montagnards in the Convention became more overtly hostile to the ruling Girondist faction. The authorities' decision to arrest Jean-Paul Marat in April brought matters to a head and precipitated the fall of the Girondins in which Hanriot played a major part. In the evening of 30 May 1793 the Commune appointed Hanriot provisionally to the position of "Commandant-General" of the Parisian National Guard, because Santerre was fighting in the Vendée. He was ordered to march his troops to the Palais National. The purpose of this move was to force the Convention to dissolve the Commission of Twelve and the arrest of 22 selected Girondists. Some people on the galleries called "A la Vendée".

During the night of 30–31 May, the city gates were closed and at 3 the tocsin (in the Notre-Dame) was rung. Hanriot ordered the firing of a cannon on the Pont-Neuf as a sign of alarm, without the permission of the Convention. Vergniaud suggested the arrest of Hanriot. (Robespierre attacked Vergniaud and denounced the commission of Twelve.) In the evening of 1 June the Comité Insurrectionnel ordered the arrest of 27 Girondins, including Jean-Marie Roland, Lebrun-Tondu and Clavière, the banning of the Girondist newspapers and the arrest of their editors. It also ordered François Hanriot, to surround the Convention ‘with a respectable armed force’.

The Convention (about 100 deputies) decided to allow men to carry arms on days of crisis and pay them for each day. It also promised to indemnify the workers for the interruptions over the past four days. It postponed any other decisions regarding the accused deputies for three days. On Saturday 1 June the Commune gathered almost all day and was devoted to the preparation of a "great movement". In the evening 40,000 men surrounded the building to force the arrests. Hanriot's first care was to seize the key positions—the Arsenal, the Place Royale, and the Pont Neuf. Next, the barriers were closed and prominent suspects arrested. At midnight the commune decided the men should take a rest and go home. The next morning the Convention invited Hanriot, who told them all his men were prepared and posts occupied.

Hanriot ordered the National Guard to march from the town hall to the National Palace. In the early evening of 2 June, a large force of armed citizens; estimated by some sources as 80,000, but spoken of by Danton as 30,000 souls, surrounded the Convention with 63 pieces of artillery. "The armed force", Hanriot said, "will retire only when the Convention has delivered to the people the deputies denounced by the Commune." Attempting to exit, the accused Girondins walked around the palace in a theatrical procession. Confronted on all sides by bayonets and pikes, they returned to the meeting hall and submitted to the inevitable. Twenty-two Girondins were seized one by one after some juggling with names. They finally decided that 31 deputies were not to be imprisoned, (Note: 19 Girondins, ten members of the Commission of Twelve and two ministers, Lebrun and Clavière.) but only subject to house arrest.

On 2 June 1793 at 11 in the morning, women gathered in front of the Convention. Then Hanriot's troops surrounded the Convention with thousands of armed volunteers, cannons, and pikes while it was in session, and throngs of sans-culotte soldiers entered the building and disrupted the sessions. The President of the Convention, Herault de Sechelles, came out to appeal to Hanriot to remove his troops, but he refused. Under that pressure, the Convention voted the arrest of 22 Girondist deputies, removing that faction from power. Marat and Couthon regarded Hanriot as the "Savior of the Fatherland". (Gérard Walter insists on the contrary on the perfect discipline of the men commanded by Hanriot. The historian thus attributes to the sans-culotte commander the merit of having avoided bloodshed during the exclusion and the arrest of the Girondins deputies.) On 11 June Hanriot resigned his command, declaring that order had been restored. On 29 June he was reelected in his section. On 1 July he was elected by the Commune and two days later appointed by Jean Bouchotte as permanent commander of the armed forces of Paris.

On 4 September, the sans-culottes again invaded the Convention. Supported by Hanriot they demanded tougher measures against rising prices and the setting up of a system of terror to root out the counter-revolution. On 11 September the power of the Committee of Public Safety was extended for one month; Robespierre supported Hanriot in the Jacobin club as having led the insurrection on 2 June. On 19 September the Convention supported his appointment as General commanding the Parisian National Guard (at that time numbering 130,000 men). Hanriot moved into an apartment on the third floor of the Hôtel de Ville, Paris, with busts of Brutus, Marat and Rousseau displayed. He hired seats in Théâtre de la République and Opera-Comique. On 8 December he declared that he would not use arms against the people; instead he would use reason.

=== End of the Reign of Terror ===
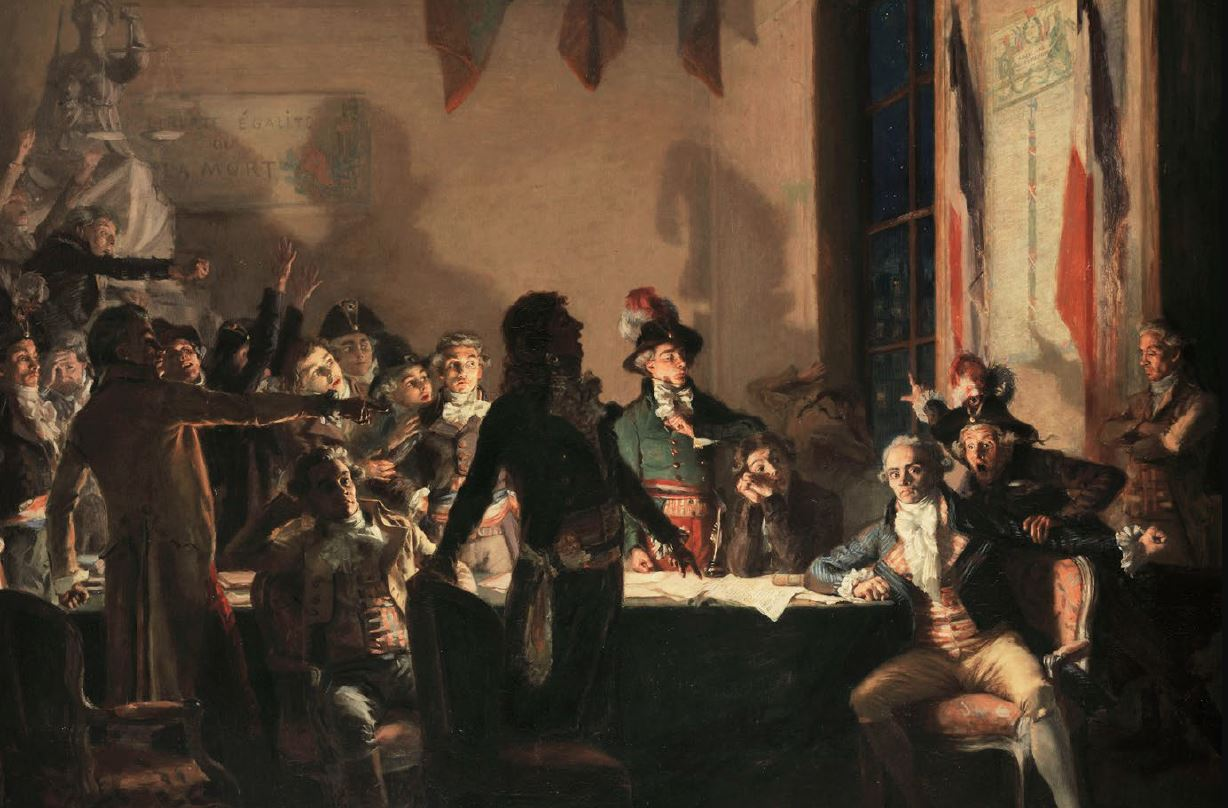
Saint-Just and Robespierre at the Hôtel de Ville on the night of 9 to 10 Thermidor Year II. Painting by Jean-Joseph Weerts

During the spring of 1794, there were increasing tensions between Robespierre and the Committees on the one hand, and the Paris Commune and the sans-culottes on the other. On 6 March Hanriot appeared in front of the Convention with 1,200 men. This culminated in the arrest of Hebert, Momoro, Vincent, Ronsin and their associates on 13 March. Hanriot, a Hébertist, was protected by Robespierre. On 27 March the sans-culotte Revolutionary Army was disbanded and its artillery units brought under Hanriot's control. Although he was broadly supportive of the radical ideas of Hébert and his associates, Hanriot remained loyal to Robespierre. On 2 April 1794 – the first day of the interrogation of Danton – he was informed not to arrest the president and the public prosecutor of Revolutionary Tribunal.

Hanriot opposed Lazare Carnot who stripped Paris of its gunners. Hanriot managed to prevent the queues in front of the butchers and bakeries from turning into a riot. On 5 June François Hanriot ordered the detaining of every baker in Paris who either sold his bread to people without (distribution) cards or who came from other sections.

On 27 July 1794 a group of Convention members organised the overthrow of Robespierre and his allies in what became known as the Thermidorean Reaction. Laurent Lecointre was the instigator of the coup, assisted by Barère, Fréron, Barras, Tallien, Thuriot, Courtois, Rovère, Garnier de l’Aube and Guffroy. Each one of these prepared his individual role in the coup. They decided that Hanriot, his aides-de-camp, Lavalette and Boulanger, the public prosecutor Dumas, the family Duplay and the printer Charles-Léopold Nicolas had to be arrested first, so Robespierre would be without military or other effective support.

At around 3 p.m. Hanriot was ordered to appear in the Convention. Hanriot, or someone else, suggested that he would only show up if accompanied by a crowd. Dumas had already been arrested at noon and at 4p.m. taken to Sainte-Pélagie Prison; as well as members of the family Duplay. On horseback, Hanriot warned the sections that there would be an attempt to murder Robespierre and mobilized 2,400 National Guards in front of the town hall. What had happened was not very clear to their officers; either the Convention was closed down or the Paris Commune. Nobody explained anything.

When the Paris Commune heard of the arrests it began mobilising forces to free Robespierre and his allies and to take control of the Convention. The mayor Fleuriot-Lescot instructed the prisons of Paris to refuse admission to any prisoners sent to them by the Convention and Hanriot took charge of military preparations for closing the Convention.

When Hanriot appeared at the Place du Carrousel in front of the Convention, he was taken prisoner by the oldest deputy present Philippe Rühl. (He seems to have been taken prisoner earlier that day by fr:Louis Antoine Joseph Robin near the Palais-Royal.) To avoid communication with Hanriot the five deputies were given a meal and it was decided they had to leave the Tuileries. According to Eric Hazan: "Now came the turning-point of this journée: instead of taking advantage of its superiority, in both guns and men, to invade the nearby hall where the Convention was sitting, the column, lacking orders or leaders, returned to the Maison-Commune." According to Bertrand Barère Hanriot fled to the town hall after being threatened by some deputies that he could be regarded as an outlaw. The Convention did not gather before nine. The Convention declared the five deputies (plus the supporting members) to be outlaws. On hearing this, the insurgents and their commander were seized with fright and fled helter-skelter to the Commune. When the Paris' militants heard this news, order began to break down, they became divided.

In the evening Robespierre, Hanriot, and the other liberated prisoners had gathered at the Hotel de Ville which was now their headquarters. The Convention responded by declaring them outlaws to be taken dead or alive, and ordering troops of its own under Barras to suppress them. Henriot ordered his men to light the entire square with torches. Within an hour, the forces of the Commune quietly deserted the square. Around two in the morning, troops of the Convention under the command of Barras arrived. Robespierre and a number of others were arrested. Hanriot fell from a side window, (Note: According to some accounts he was pushed out of the window by Coffinhal, who shouted at him 'You fool! Your cowardice has lost us!') and was found later in the day, unconscious, in a neighbouring courtyard. Hanriot was taken to the guillotine in the same cart as Robespierre and his brother and was executed just before Robespierre on 28 July 1794, only semi-conscious when led to the platform.

According to Merda Hanriot tried to escape by a concealed staircase to the third floor. He lodged in an apartment there. Most sources say that Hanriot was thrown out of a window by Coffinhal after being accused of the disaster. (According to Ernest Hamel it is one of the many legends spread by Barère.) At any rate, Hanriot landed in a small courtyard on a heap of glass. He had strength enough to crawl into a drain where he was found twelve hours later and taken to the Conciergerie.

In the afternoon of 10 Thermidor (28 July, a décadi, a day of rest and festivity) the Revolutionary Tribunal condemned Robespierre and 21 "Robespierrists" (c.q. 13 members of the insurrectionary Commune) to death by the rules of the law of 22 Prairial, only verifying their identity at the trial. In the late afternoon, the convicts were taken in three carts to the Place de la Révolution to be executed.

Hanriot owned 47 prints of different events during the revolution, a "magnifique" wooden secretary desk, and the complete works by Jean-Jacques Rousseau, published by Pierre-Alexandre DuPeyrou and René Louis de Girardin (1780–1782).

== Sources ==
- Andress, David (2006). The Terror: The Merciless War for Freedom in Revolutionary France. Farrar, Straus, and Giroux. ISBN 978-0374273415.
- Furet, François (1996). The French Revolution: 1770–1814. Oxford: Blackwell Publishers Ltd. ISBN 0-631-20299-4.
- Israel, Jonathan (2014). Revolutionary Ideas: An Intellectual History of the French Revolution from The Rights of Man to Robespierre. Princeton University Press. ISBN 978-1-4008-4999-4.
- Legrand, Jacques (1989). Chronicle of the French Revolution : 1788–1799. Longman, Chronicle. ISBN 0-582-05194-0. OCLC 231002598.
- Schama, Simon (1989). Citizens: A Chronicle of the French Revolution. New York: Alfred A. Knopf. ISBN 978-0-394-55948-3.
- Scurr, Ruth (2006). Fatal Purity: Robespierre and the French Revolution. New York: Macmillan. ISBN 978-0805082616.
- Thompson, J. M. (1959). The French Revolution. Oxford: Basil Blackwell.
- Thompson, J. M. (1988). Robespierre. New York: B. Blackwell. ISBN 978-0631155041.
- Chisholm, Hugh, ed. (1911). "Hanriot, François" . Encyclopædia Britannica. Vol. 12 (11th ed.). Cambridge University Press. p. 927.
