= Laurent Lecointre =

French politician (1742-1805)

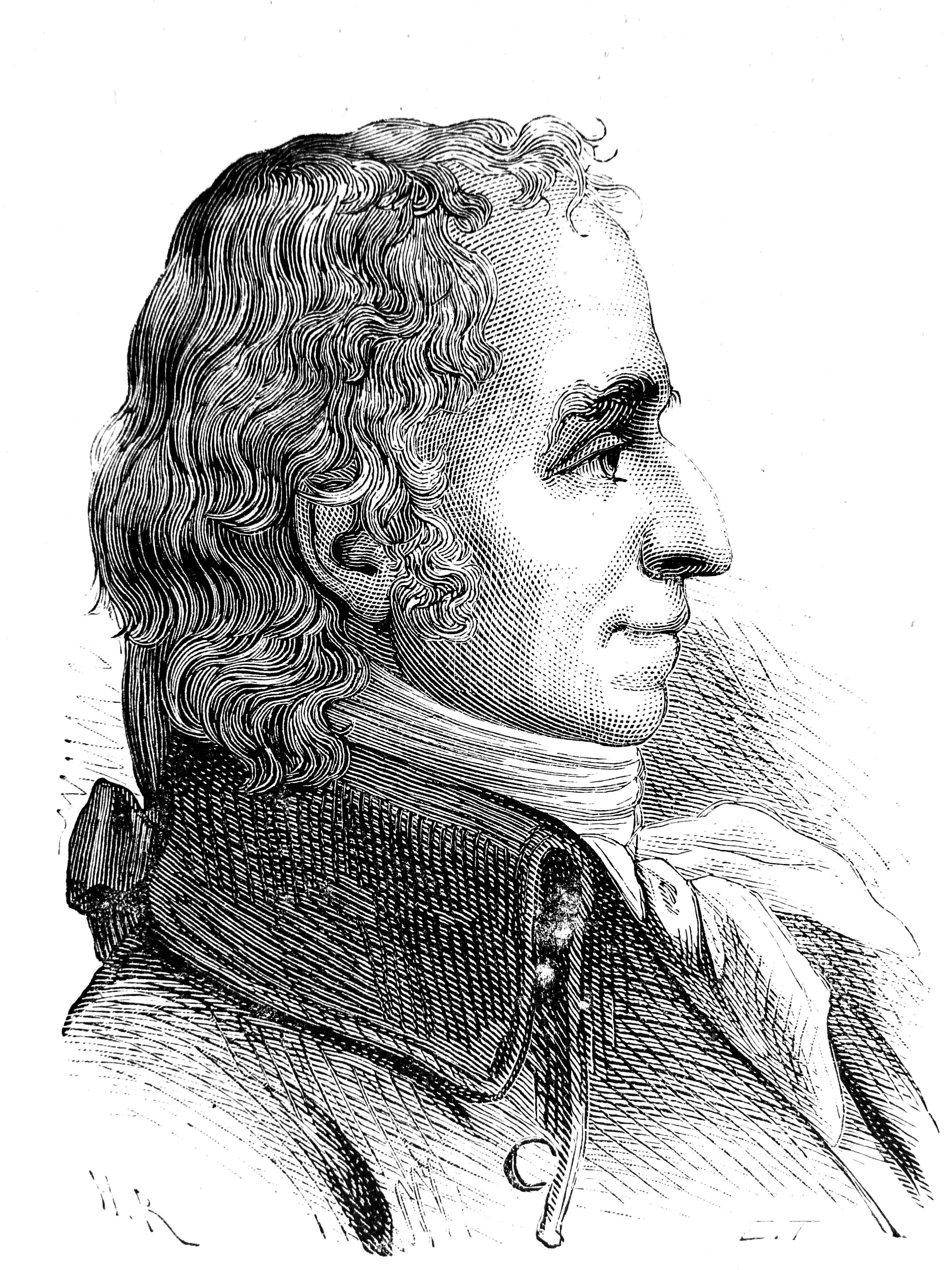
- Portrait of Laurent Lecointre.

Member of the National Convention for Seine-et-Oise
- In office 6 September 1792 – 26 October 1795

Personal details
- Born: Laurent Lecointre; 1 February 1742 Versailles, France
- Died: 4 August 1805 (aged 63) Guignes, Seine-et-Marne
- Party: The Mountain

Laurent Lecointre (German pronunciation: [lɔʁɑ̃ ləkwɛ̃tʁ]) was a French politician, born at Versailles on 1 February 1742, and died at Guignes, Seine-et-Marne on 4 August 1805. He is also known under the name of "Lecointre de Versailles".

== Life ==
Unlike almost all his colleagues of the National Convention, Laurent Lecointre was not a lawyer by training, but a merchant of canvases. In 1789, he was second in command ("lieutenant-colonel") of the National Guard of Versailles under the orders of Charles Henri Hector d'Estaing. It was Lecointre who evacuated the chateau de Versailles, and regulated the crowd on the 6th of October 1789, the day of the Women's March on Versailles. He was an important member of "La Société des amis de la Constitution" de Versailles. It was Lecointre who led Robespierre to the carpenter Maurice Duplay, on 17 July 1791, after the Champ de Mars Massacre. He published a speech in Le Défenseur de la Constitution (n°5) On September 15, 1792, he proposed that the dauphin and his sister be separated from their parents. After the defection of Dumouriez in April 1793, Count Louis-Auguste Juvénal des Ursins d'Harville became suspect and was arrested at the request of Lecointre. He became the first witness at the trial of Marie-Antoinette in October 1793. Lecointre denounced the crazy nights in the Grand Trianon, and the luxury of the court.

The day of the ceremony of the Cult of the Supreme Being on 8 June 1794, he and Barras called Maximilien de Robespierre a tyrant and feared for their lives before 9 Thermidor. According to Lecointre the Law of 22 Prairial was written by Robespierre and not by Couthon. Lecointre, the instigator of the coup, that led to the Fall of Robespierre, contacted Robert Lindet on the 6th, and Vadier on the 7th Thermidor. The other members were: Fréron, Barras, Tallien, Courtois, Thuriot, Rovère, Garnier de l’Aube and Guffroy (Fouché was not involved). They decided that Hanriot, Dumas and the family Duplay had to be arrested first, so Robespierre would be without support, but things went differently.

In April 1795 he was involved in the Insurrection of 12 Germinal, Year III. The Assembly immediately voted the deportation of Collot, Billaud, and Barere to Guiana. Eight prominent Montagnards were arrested including Amar, Leonard Bourdon, Cambon, René Levasseur, Maignet, Lecointre and Thuriot. It was an indication of the extent to which the Assembly was now bent on undoing the past.

He benefited from the general amnesty general voted during the separation of the national Convention on the 26th of October 1795. Laurent Lecointre, then adheres to the ideas of Gracchus Babeuf, but denies any link with him?

Under the French Consulate Lecointre was the only one who voted against the Constitution of the Year VIII (1799), which established three consuls for life? He was exiled to Guignes, where he owned a property, and ended his days.

== Works ==
- Opinion de Laurent Lecointre ... sur le jugement de Louis Capet (1793)
- Laurent Lecointre, de Versailles, député du département de Seine et Oise a la Convention Nationale, septembre 1794
- Laurent Lecointre, au peuple souverain (1794)
- ROBESPIERRE peint par lui-même, par Laurent Lecointre
- Les Crimes de sept membres des anciens Comités de salut public et de sûreté générale, ou Dénonciation formelle à la Convention nationale contre Billaud-Varennes, Barère, Collot-d'Herbois, Vadier, Vouland, Amar et David, suivie de pièces justificatives, indication d'autres pièces originales existantes dans les comités, preuves et témoins indiqués à l'appui des faits, par Laurent Lecointre (1795)
- Les Abus Des Pouvoirs Illimites : Avec Des Reflexions Sur l'Etat Present de la Republique
- L'abolition du gouvernement revolutionnaire, ou, Discours de Laurent Lecointre, deputé du departement de Seine-&-Oise, a la Convention nationale, sur la necessite d'organiser sur-le-champ le gouvernement populaire d'apres la Constitution democratique de 1793, acceptee par le peuple français (1795)
- À Monsieur le Marquis de la Fayette, Généralissime des Troupes du Roi, Commandant Général des Gardes Nationales de Paris Et de Versailles
- Observations de Laurent Lecointre et demande en rapport du décret d'hier, qui prononce l'expulsion totale de la famille des Bourbons
- Conjuration formée dès le 5 préréal, par neuf représentans du peuple contre Maximilien Robespierre, pour le poignarder en plein Sénat. Rapport d'accusation.
