= Bertrand Barère =

French politician, freemason and journalist (1755–1841)

The Citizen Bertrand Barère
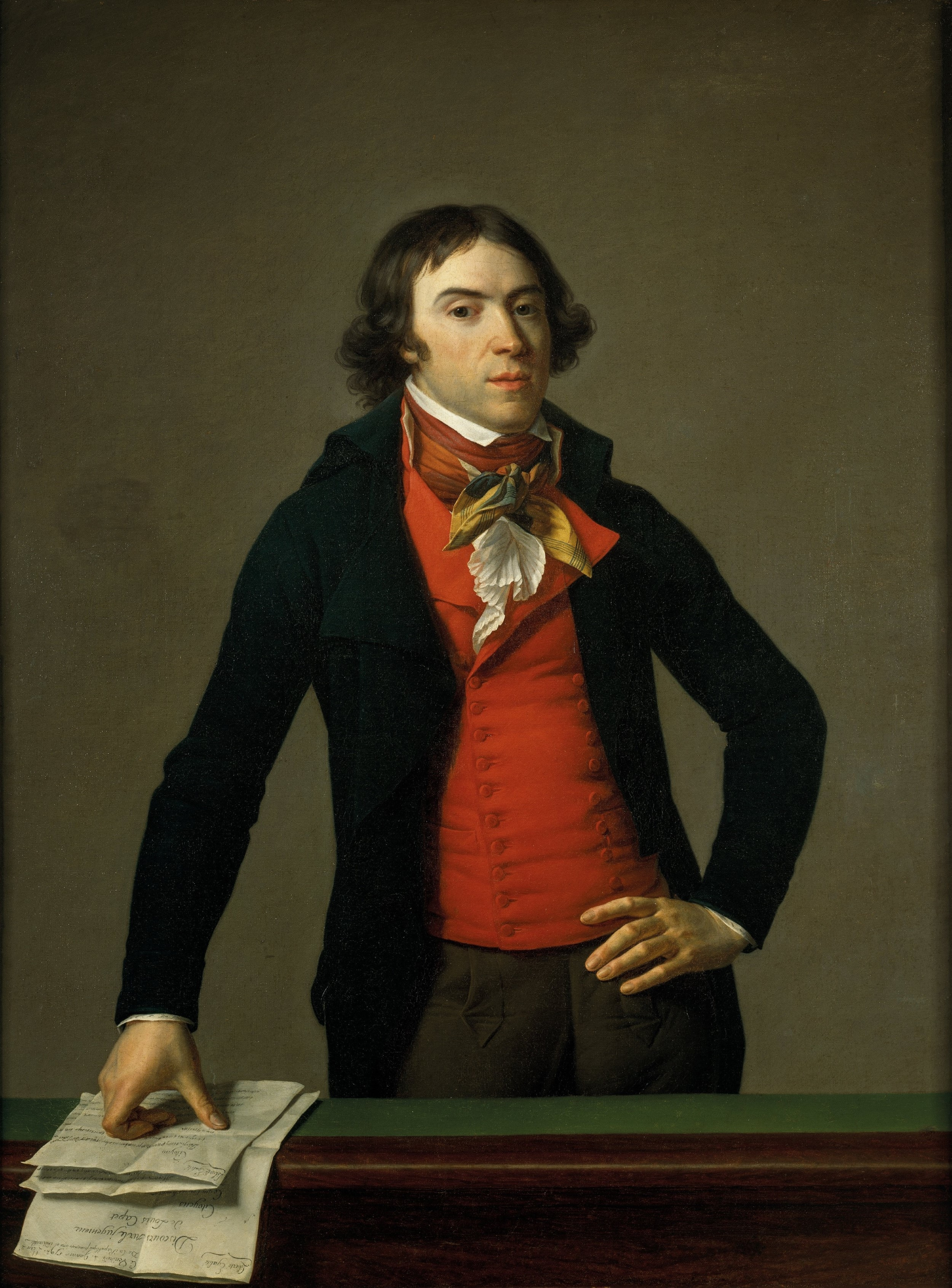
- Portrait by Jean-Louis Laneuville, 1794

Member of the Chamber of Representatives from Hautes-Pyrénées
- In office 3 June 1815 – 13 July 1815
- Preceded by: Jean Lacrampe
- Succeeded by: Jean-Baptiste Darrieux
- Constituency: Tarbes

Member of the Council of Five Hundred from Hautes-Pyrénées
- In office 22 October 1795 – 26 December 1799
- Preceded by: Himself in the National Convention
- Constituency: Tarbes

Commissioner to Navy, Military and Foreign Affairs
- In office 6 April 1793 – 1 September 1794
- Majority: Committee of Public Safety

6th President of the National Convention
- In office 29 November 1792 – 13 December 1792
- Preceded by: Henri Grégoire
- Succeeded by: Jacques Defermon

Member of the National Convention from Hautes-Pyrénées
- In office 4 September 1792 – 26 October 1795
- Preceded by: Jean Dareau-Laubadère
- Succeeded by: Himself in the Council of Five Hundred
- Constituency: Tarbes

Deputy to the Estates-General for the Third Estate
- In office 5 May 1789 – 9 July 1789
- Constituency: Bigorre

Personal details
- Born: 10 September 1755 Tarbes, Gascony, France
- Died: 13 January 1841 (aged 85) Tarbes, Hautes-Pyrénées, France
- Party: Marais (1792–1795); Montagnard (1795–1799); Liberal Left (1815)
- Spouse: Élisabeth de Monde (m. 1785; sep. 1793)
- Profession: Lawyer
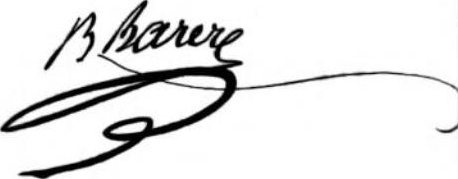
- Signature

Bertrand Barère de Vieuzac (French pronunciation: [bɛʁtʁɑ̃ baʁɛʁ də vjøzak], 10 September 1755 – 13 January 1841) was a French politician, freemason, journalist, and one of the most prominent members of the National Convention, representing the Plain (a moderate Political faction) during the French Revolution. The Plain was dominated by the radical Montagnards and Barère as one of their leaders supported the foundation of the Committee of Public Safety in April and of a sans-culottes army in September 1793. According to Francois Buzot, Barère was responsible for the Reign of Terror, like Robespierre and Louis de Saint-Just. (Note: Most of the arrests during the Reign of Terror came from Barère, Lazare Carnot and Pierre Louis Prieur.) In spring 1794 and after the Festival of the Supreme Being, he became an opponent of Maximilien Robespierre and joined the coup, leading to his downfall.

== Early life ==
Bertrand Barère was born in Tarbes, a commune, part of the Gascony region. The name Barère de Vieuzac, by which he continued to call himself long after the abolition of feudalism in France, originated from a small fief belonging to his father, Jean Barère, who was a lawyer at Vieuzac (now Argelès-Gazost). Barère's mother, Jeanne-Catherine Marrast, was of the old nobility. Barére attended parish school when he was a child, and by the time he was of age, his brother, Jean-Pierre, became a priest.^{[3]} Jean-Pierre would later earn a spot in the Council of Five Hundred alongside the very men who discarded any notion of accepting Bertrand Barére as a member.

After finishing parish school, Barère attended a college before delving into his career in revolutionary politics. In 1770, he began to practice as a lawyer at the Parlement of Toulouse, one of the most celebrated parliaments of the kingdom. Barère practiced as an advocate with considerable success and wrote some small pieces, which he sent to the principal literary societies in the south of France. His fame as an essayist was what led to his election as a member of the Academy of Floral Games of Toulouse in 1788. This body held a yearly meeting of great interest to the whole city, at which flowers of gold and silver were awarded for odes, idyls, and eloquence. Although Barère never received any of these bounties, one of his performances was mentioned with honor. At the Academy of Floral Games of Montauban, he was awarded many prizes, including one for a panegyric on King Louis XII, and another for a panegyric on Franc de Pompignan. Shortly after, Barère wrote a dissertation on an old stone with three Latin words engraved on it. This earned him a seat in the Toulouse Academy of Sciences, Inscriptions, and Polite Literature.

In 1785, Barère married a young lady of considerable fortune. In one of his works titled Melancholy Pages, Barère proclaims that his marriage "was one of the most unhappy of marriages." In 1789, he was elected deputy by the estates of Bigorre to the Estates-General – he had made his first visit to Paris in the preceding year. Barère de Vieuzac at first belonged to the constitutional party, but he was less known as a speaker in the National Constituent Assembly than as a journalist. According to François Victor Alphonse Aulard, Barère's paper, the Point du Jour, owed its reputation not so much to its own qualities as to the depiction of Barére in the Tennis Court Oath sketch. The painter Jacques-Louis David illustrated Barère kneeling in the corner and writing a report of the proceedings for posterity.

== Political career (1789–93) ==
Barère was elected to the Estates-General in 1789 and elected judge of the Constituent Assembly in 1791.^{[4]}

Soon after the king's flight to Varennes (June 1791), Barère joined the republican party and the Feuillants. However, he continued to keep in touch with the Duke of Orléans, whose natural daughter, Pamela, he tutored. After the Constituent Assembly ended its session, he was nominated one of the judges of the newly instituted Cour de cassation from October 1791 to September 1792.

In September 1792 he was elected to the National Convention for the département of the Hautes-Pyrénées.^{[5]} Barère served as presiding officer in the National Convention and chaired the trial of Louis XVI in December 1792–January 1793.^{[7]} He voted with The Mountain for the king's execution "without appeal and without delay," and closed his speech with: "the tree of liberty grows only when watered by the blood of tyrants."

He was a member of the Constitution Committee that drafted the Girondin constitutional project in February 1793. On 18 March Barère proposed to establish a Committee of Public Safety. On 7 April, Barère was elected to the Committee of Public Safety. A member of "The Plain," who was unaligned with either The Mountain or the Girondins, he was the first member elected to the Committee of Public Safety and one of two members (with Robert Lindet), who served on it during its entire existence. In this role he utilized his eloquence and popularity within the convention to serve as the voice of the committee. Of 923 orders signed by the Committee of Public Safety in the fall of 1793, Barère was the author or first signatory on 244, the second most behind Carnot, with the majority of his orders dealing with police activities. The majority of the Plain was formed by independents as Barère, Cambon and Carnot but they were dominated by the radical Mountain.

Despite his popularity, Barère was regarded by more extreme revolutionaries as a vacillating politician without true revolutionary ideals. Palmer (1949) analyzed that 'his commitment to the Revolution rather than any distinct faction separated him from other major Revolutionary figures'. Jean-Paul Marat used the last edition of his paper Publiciste de la République Française (no. 242, 14 July 1793) to attack Barère directly:

There is one whom I regard as the most dangerous enemy of the Nation: I mean Barère... I'm convinced that he plays both sides of every issue until he sees which one is coming out ahead. He has paralysed all vigorous efforts; he enchains us in order to strangle us.

On 1 August, on a report by Barère, the Convention decreed the systematic destruction of the Vendée. On 5 September 1793 Barère incited the French National Convention with a speech glorifying terror and the founding of revolutionary armies by Sans-culottes:

The aristocrats of Internal Affairs are since many days meditating a movement. Oh well! They'll have it, that movement, but they'll have it against them! It will be organized, regularized by a revolutionary army that at last will fulfill that great word that it owes to the Paris Commune: Let's make terror the order of the day!

Barère voiced the Committee of Public Safety's support for the measures desired by the assembly. He presented a decree that was passed immediately, establishing a paid armed force of 6,000 men and 1,200 gunners "designed to crush the counter-revolutionaries, to execute wherever the need arises the revolutionary laws and the measures of public safety that are decreed by the National Convention, and to protect provisions." In a proclamation, Barère said:

It is time that equality bore its scythe above all heads. It is time to horrify all the conspirators. So legislators, place Terror on the order of the day! Let us be in revolution because everywhere counter-revolution is being woven by our enemies. The blade of the law should hover over all the guilty.

On 12 October when Hébert accused Marie-Antoinette of incest with her son, Robespierre had dinner with Barère, Saint-Just and Joachim Vilate. Discussing the matter, Robespierre broke his plate with his fork and called Hébert an "imbécile".

Barère voted for the death of the 21 Girondists in October 1793. His role as the chief communicator throughout the Reign of Terror, combined with his lyrical eloquence, led to his nickname: "Anacreon of the Guillotine." He changed his stance when the Hébertists called for another revolution in March 1794; the voluntary Guards and militant Sans-culottes lost influence quickly. He can be seen as a "weathervane" after changing his opinion on the revolutionary armies. (Note: On 27 March on the proposal of Barère the armée revolutionnaire, for seven months active in Paris and surroundings, was disbanded, except their artillery. Their infantry and cavalry seem to be merged with other regiments.) In summer he was one of the leading men in the power struggles between The Mountain and The Plain, involved in the downfall of Robespierre. Barère, an opportunist who cooperated in the tyranny, then described him as "the Terror itself".

== Ideas, philosophy ==
After January 1793, Barère began publicly speaking of his newfound faith in "la religion de la patrie". He wanted everyone to have faith in the fatherland and called for the people of the Republic to be virtuous citizens. Barère mainly focused on four aspects about "la religion de la patrie" – the belief that a citizen would be consecrated to the fatherland at birth, the citizen should then come to love the fatherland, the Republic would teach the people virtues, and the fatherland would be the teacher to all. Barère went on to state that "the Republic leaves the guidance of your first years to your parents, but as soon as your intelligence is developed, it proudly claims the rights that it holds over you. You are born for the Republic and not for the pride or the despotism of families." He also claimed that because citizens were born for the Republic, they should love it above anything else. Barére reasoned that eventually the love for the fatherland would become a passion in everyone and this is how the people of the Republic would be united.^{[10]}

Barère also urged further issues of nationalism and patriotism. He said, "I was a revolutionary. I am a constitutional citizen." He pushed for freedom of press, speech, and thought. Barère felt that nationalism was founded by immeasurable emotions that could only be awakened by participating in national activities such as public events, festivals, and education. He believed in unity through "diversity and compromise."

In 1793 and 1794, Barère focused on speaking of his doctrine, which included the teaching of national patriotism through an organized system of universal education, the national widespread of patriotic devotion, and the concept that one owed his nation his services.^{[12]} Barère also stated that one could serve the nation by giving his labor, wealth, counsel, strength, and/or blood. Therefore, all sexes and ages could serve the fatherland. He outlined his new faith in the fatherland, which replaced the national state religion, Catholicism. Barère was trying to make nationalism a religion. Besides being concerned for the fatherland, Barère believed in universal elementary education. His influence on education is seen in American schools today as they recite the pledge of allegiance, and teach the alphabet and the multiplication table.^{[9]} Barère believed that the fatherland could educate all. On 27 March on the proposal of Barère the armée revolutionnaire, for seven months active in Paris and surroundings, was disbanded, except their artillery. During the Festival of the Supreme Being Robespierre was not only criticized by Barère, but also by Vadier, Courtois and Fouché, the other members of the Committee of General Security.

== Conflicts within the government ==
As 1794 progressed, tensions mounted inside the Committee of Public Safety as well as with other committees and the convention's representatives on mission.

Some members of the Committee of Public Safety, such as Jean-Marie Collot d'Herbois and Billaud-Varenne, had pursued aggressive campaigns of Terror. Another clique on the committee, consisting of Robespierre, Couthon, and Saint-Just believed in their own vision of the direction of the Revolution.

In his memoirs written years later about this time, Barère described the Committee of Public Safety of having at least three factions:

- the "experts" consisting of Lazare Carnot, Robert Lindet, and Pierre Louis Prieur;
- the "high-hands" consisting of Robespierre, Couthon, and Saint-Just; and
- the "true revolutionaries" consisting of Billaud-Varenne, Collot, and Barère himself.

At the same time, the Committee of General Security, nominally the police committee of the National Convention, had seen its place superseded by the Law of 22 Prairial, leaving members like Marc-Guillaume Alexis Vadier and Jean-Pierre-André Amar concerned for their status. These were the laws that led to the streamlining of the Revolutionary Tribunal and the Great Terror, in which there were more executions in the final seven weeks before 9 Thermidor by the Paris tribunal than in the previous fourteen months.

Finally, aggressive representatives on mission, including Joseph Fouche, had been recalled to Paris to face scrutiny for their actions in the countryside and all feared for their safety.

In this atmosphere, Barère attempted to forge a compromise between these splintering factions. On 4 Thermidor, Barère offered to help enforce the Ventose Decrees in exchange for an agreement to not pursue a purge of the National Convention. These decrees, a program of property confiscation that had seen little support in the previous four months, were received with cautious optimism by Couthon and Saint-Just.

However, the following day, at a joint meeting of the Committees, Robespierre once again proclaimed his dedication to purging the Committees of potential, though unnamed, enemies. Saint-Just declared in negotiations with Barère that he was prepared to make concessions on the subordinate position of the Committee of General Security.

== Thermidor crisis (July 1794) ==
Robespierre continued down this path until 8 Thermidor when he gave a famous oration alluding to multiple threats within the National Convention. A bitter debate ensued until Barère forced an end to it. However, to his surprise, Robespierre was pushed for more evidence by members of the Committee of General Security. This led to a fierce debate and a lack of support from the deputies of the Plain, both of which Robespierre was not used to.

After being ejected from the Jacobin Club that night, Collot and Billaud-Varenne returned to the Committee of Public Safety to find Saint-Just at work on a speech for the next day. Though Barère had been pushing Saint-Just to give a speech regarding the new unity of the Committees, both Collot and Billaud-Varenne assumed he was working on their final denunciation. This led to the final fracturing of the Committee of Public Safety, and a heated argument ensued, in which Barère allegedly insulted Couthon, Saint-Just, and Robespierre, saying:

"Who are you then, insolent pygmies, that you want to divide the remains of our country between a cripple, a child and a scoundrel? I wouldn't give you a farmyard to govern!"

The final pieces of the plot fell into place that night. Laurent Lecointre was the instigator of the coup, assisted by Barère, Fréron, Barras, Tallien, Thuriot, Courtois, Rovère, Garnier de l’Aube and Guffroy. (Fouché was no longer involved and had hidden.) Each one of them prepared his part in the attack. On 9 Thermidor, as Saint-Just rose to give his planned speech, he was interrupted by Tallien and Billaud-Varenne. After some denunciations of Robespierre, a cry went up for Barère to speak.

A possibly apocryphal tale held that as Barère rose to speak he held two speeches in his pocket: one for Robespierre and one against him. Here Barère played his role in 9 Thermidor, by submitting a bill that would blunt the ability of the Paris Commune to be used as a military force. According to Barère, the committees asked themselves why there still existed a military regime in Paris; why all these permanent commanders, with staffs, and immense armed forces? The committees have thought it best to restore to the National Guard its democratic organization. The day after Robespierre's death, Barère described him as the "tyrant" and "the Terror itself".

== Arrest ==
Nevertheless, Barère was still questioned on the grounds of being a terrorist. Before Barère was sentenced to prison, "Carnot defended him on the ground that [Barère] was hardly worse than himself." However, the defense proved ineffective. On 2nd Germinal of the year III (22 March 1795), the leaders of Thermidor decreed the arrest of Barère and his colleagues in the Reign of Terror, Jean Marie Collot d'Herbois and Jacques Nicolas Billaud-Varenne.

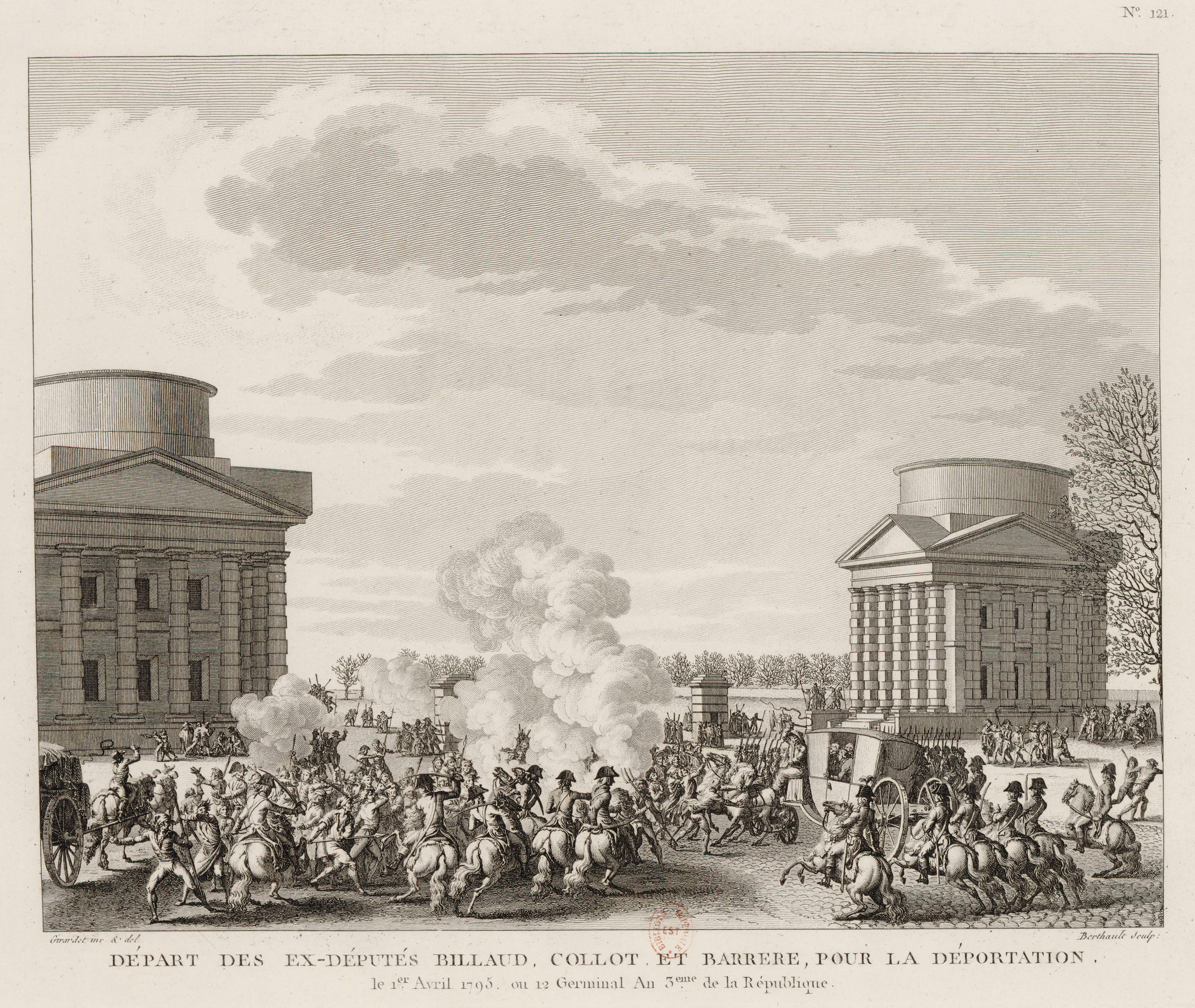
Deportation of former members of the Committee of Public Safety, Barère, Billaud-Varenne and Collot, the day after the insurgency of 12th of Germinal (1st April 1795), causes violent unrest in Paris

The Court hearings continued until being interrupted by the Insurrection of 12 Germinal, Year III (1 April 1795). After the insurrection was dealt with, the Assembly voted the deportation of Collot, Billaud, and Barere to Guiana without further ado. Significant disturbances occurred in Paris on the day of deportation.

Barère was sentenced for his betrayal of Louis XVI (by voting to execute him), for being a traitor to France, and for being a terrorist.

The three prisoners were moved to the island of Oléron in preparation for being transported to French Guiana. Barère's increasing depression while in prison led him to write his own epitaph. While the other two prisoners were sent to Guiana, Barère still remained at Oléron.

Meanwhile, the political developments in Paris resulted in the decision to put him on trial again. He was moved to Saintes, Charente-Maritime, where he spent four months awaiting trial. Eventually, the Convention decided without trial to confirm the old sentence of deportation.

== Escape from prison ==
When Barère learned about this, his cousin, Hector Barère, and two other people helped him escape prison. Although Barère was reluctant to escape, his friends believed that he should leave at the earliest opportunity.

According to his own later memoirs, the original plan was to escape over the garden walls or from the dormitory with the help of a long rope-ladder. This plan soon proved impossible as it was discovered that the garden was out of Barère's reach and that the dormitory was closed.

The escape plan was soon reconfigured, as it was decided that Barère would escape by the cloister and garden of the convent. Barère escaped on 4 Brumaire IV (26 October 1795), with the help also of a local man named Eutrope Vanderkand. He went to Bordeaux, where he lived in hiding for several years.

In early 1798 (while still in hiding), he was elected to the Directory's Council of Five Hundred from his native Hautes-Pyrénées, but he was not allowed to take his seat.

In April 1799, the Directory issued an order for his arrest, so he left Bordeaux and hid out in Saint-Ouen-sur-Seine near Paris.

== Amnesty ==
On 24 December 1799, Napoleon issued an amnesty for some politicians of both the right and the left, including Barère. Under the First Empire, he was engaged in literary work. It was rumoured that he served as a confidential informant for Napoleon. Starting in 1803, he published an anti-British magazine, Le Mémorial anti-britannique, subsidized by the government. This publication continued until 1807.

In February 1814, he moved back to his native region of France.

He became a member of the Chamber of Deputies during the Hundred Days on 1815.

When the final restoration of the Bourbons took place on 8 July 1815, he was banished from France for life "as a regicide". Barère then withdrew to Brussels, where he lived until 1830.

He returned to France and served Louis Philippe under the July Monarchy until his death on 13 January 1841. The last surviving member of the revolutionary Committee of Public Safety, his memoirs were published posthumously in four volumes by Hippolyte Carnot in 1842 and reviewed for English readers at exhaustive length (80 pages) by Thomas Babington Macaulay.

An English translation was published in 1896:

- Vol I
- Vol II
- Vol III
- Vol IV

== See also ==
- Society of the Friends of Truth
