= Edme-Bonaventure Courtois =

French politician (1754-1816)

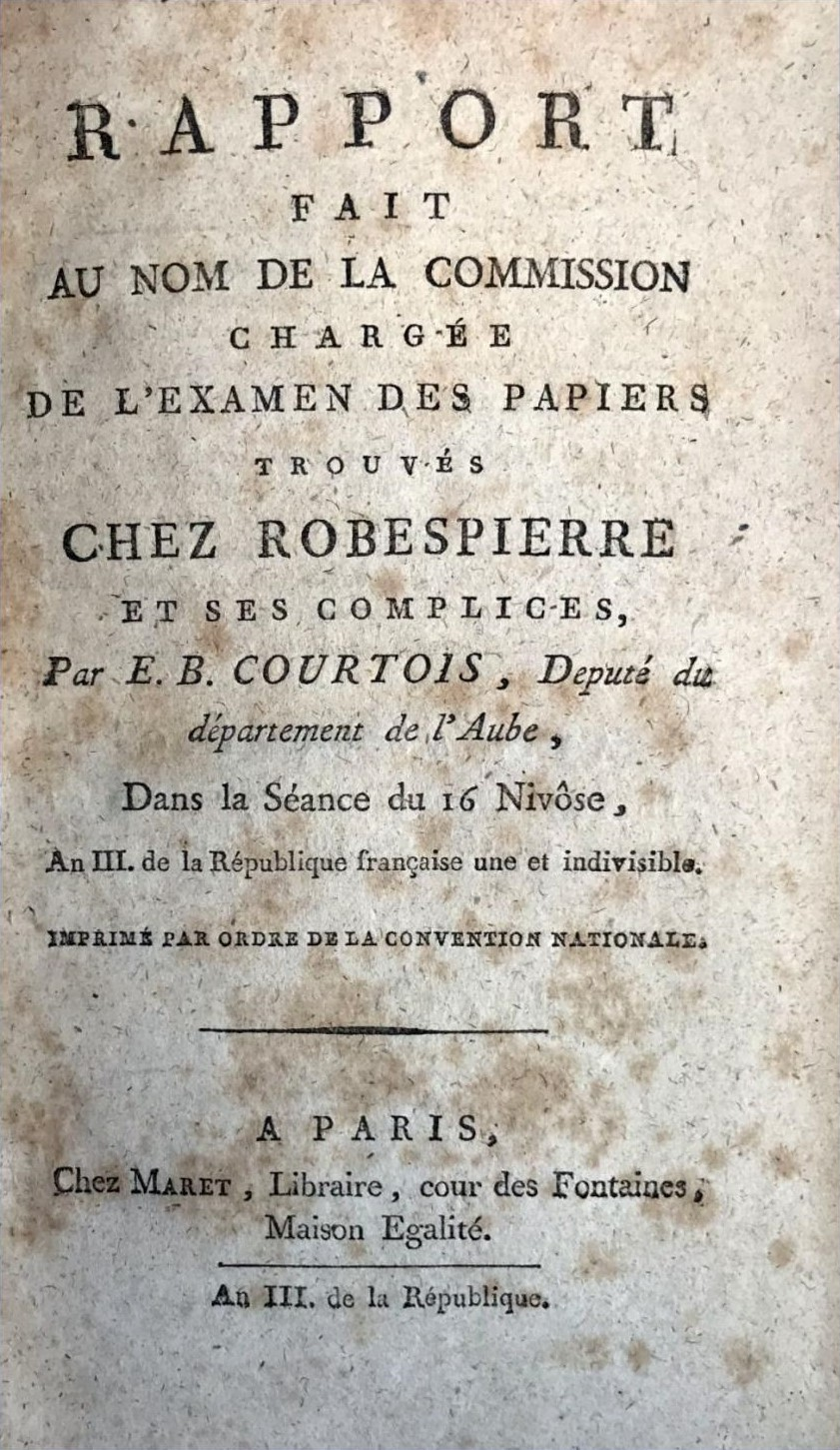
Rapport fait au nom de la Commission chargée de l'examen des papiers trouvés chez Robespierre et ses complices

Edme-Bonaventure Courtois (French pronunciation: [ɛdmə bɔnavɑ̃tyʁ kuʁtwa]; born 15 July 1754 in Troyes, France - died on 6 December 1816 in Brussels) was a deputy of the National Convention. He found the will of Marie Antoinette in the collection of papers of Maximilien Robespierre hidden under his bed.

== Life ==
Courtois was the son of a baker. He met Georges Danton at the College of Juilly, where he finished his brilliant studies. He was a manufacturer of sabots at Arcis-sur-Aube. In 1787 his wife died. He was elected to the Legislative as deputy of the Aube and to the National Convention and supported the Montagnards. In 1791 he helped Danton to hide.

Courtois, who compared Robespierre with Catiline, was involved in the coup that led to the fall of Robespierre, together with Laurent Lecointre, the instigator. Lecointre contacted Robert Lindet on the 6th, and Vadier on the 7th Thermidor. The other members were: Fréron, Barras, Tallien, Thuriot, Rovère, Garnier de l’Aube and Guffroy (Fouché was not involved). They decided that Hanriot, Dumas and the family Duplay had to be arrested first, so Robespierre would be without support.

After the 9 Thermidor, he was a member of the commission in charge of the inventory of the papers owned by Robespierre, including the will of Marie-Antoinette written in the Conciergerie on her last day 16 October 1793.

On 30 July Courtois took in custody Robespierre's books by Corneille, Voltaire, Rousseau, Mably, Locke, Bacon, Pope, articles by Addison and Steele in The Spectator, an English and Italian dictionary, an English grammar, and the Bible. Nothing about Richard Price or Joseph Priestley who had influenced Condorcet, Mirabeau, Clavière and Brissot so much.

Yet by the time the moderate deputy Edme-Bonaventure Courtois presented the official report to the assembly on 8 Thermidor Year III (July 26, 1795), a thorough reconceptualization of the day had occurred. The role of the Montagnards and of the people of Paris was simply erased. This rewriting of history was congruent with the general direction of Thermidorian policies toward popular involvement in the revolutionary process. It was also to prove influential in subsequent historiography of the events of 9 Thermidor.

He published the famous report «Papiers inédits trouvés chez Robespierre, Saint-Just etc.» in February 1795. It is possible he added, and left papers out.

From 15 October 1795 – 26 December 1799 he was a member of the Conseil des Anciens. In 1796 he produced: "Rapport fait au nom des comités de Salut public et de Sûreté générale sur les événements du 9 thermidor an II..." He purchased one of the finest hotels in the faubourg Saint-Honoré, with a beautiful garden on the Champs-Élysées. He contributed to the coup of 18 Brumaire and was elected a member of the Tribunat, however, suspicions of misappropriation forced him to withdraw as a member of the Tribunat in 1802.

He then moved to chateau Rambluzin, near Verdun, between his impressive collection of classical literature. For a while he was the mayor (1812-), but on 12 January 1816 during the Bourbon Restauration, when members of the parliament who voted the death of Louis XVI in 1793 and later supported the emperor, were condemned to exile, Courtois was forced to leave the country and moved to Brussels, leaving most of his collection (3723 items) behind. On 25 January 1816, he tried to avoid the ban by writing to the councillor of State by Louis Becquey to make him aware that he had documents concerning the royal family, found in the papers of Robespierre, and that he offered to the King, including a letter written by Marie Antoinette to her sister-in-law Madame Élisabeth at the time of this ordeal, called "the testament of the Queen"; a glove that belonged to the Dauphin; a small bundle of hair from Marie-Antoinette. The collection was bought by Richard Heber.

He married twice, in 1776 and in 1789. It is possible he committed suicide.
