= Saint Agericus' barrel =

Medieval legend

Saint Agericus' barrel is a legend involving the 6th Century Bishop of Verdun

When Saint Agericus was elderly, he received a visit from King Childebert II and his court. The bishop hosted a grand feast for his guests, but the Frankish warriors drank so much that the wine ran out. Upon hearing this, Agericus ordered the last remaining barrel of wine to be brought to him. He blessed it and instructed the servants to keep serving. The wine never ran dry and was said to be even better than before.

In gratitude, the king donated land to the Diocese of Verdun, including estates in Sampigny, Cumières, Charny-sur-Meuse, Tilly-sur-Meuse, and Harville.

Saint Agericus is often depicted holding his miraculous barrel.
