= Harville (disambiguation) =

Harville is a commune in Meuse, France.

Harville may also refer to:

- Chad Harville (born 1976), U.S. baseball player
- Louis-Auguste Juvénal des Ursins d'Harville, Count of Harville (1749–1815) General of France
- Captain Harville, a fictional character from the 1817 Jane Austen novel Persuasion

== See also ==
- Harville Hendrix (born 1935) self-help book author
