= House of Kuadzhe =

Circassian house of peasant and privateer origin

House of Kuadzhe Къуаджэ Лъэпкъ
- Circassian house of peasant and privateer origin
- Country: Shapsugia (formerly); Circassia (formerly); Russian Empire (formerly); Mountainous Republic of the Northern Caucasus (formerly); Soviet Union (formerly); Confederation of Mountain Peoples of the Caucasus (formerly); Russia; Turkey
- Etymology: Quadzhe (Къуаджэ), meaning "son of Kua" in Ubykh
- Origin: Aguy, Shapsugia, Circassia (present-day Aguy-Shapsug, Tuapsinsky District, Krasnodar Krai, Russia)
- Founded: Unknown
- Founder: Kuadzhe Kua (in theory)
- Members: Kuadzhe Makhmet Berdyko; Kuadzhe Limigen Kushkhashauko; Kuadzhe Galimet Aslan Iskhakovna; Kuadzhe Malazim Iskhakovich; Kuadzhe Elmiz Alkhasovich; Kuadzhe Bagagush Tagagukovich; Kuadzhe Ruslanid Zaidovich
- Traditions: Khabzeism; Sunni Islam
- Website: Facebook Community of House Kuadzhe

House of Kuadzhe (/ˈkwɑːdʒeɪˌ -ə/) (Note: Adyghe: Къуаджэ Лъэпкъ, romanized: Quadzhe Tlepq; Russian: Куадже; Turkish: Kuace Sülalesi) is a Circassian house of peasant and privateer origin of Shapsug tribe of Circassia. It actively supported Circassia during the Russo-Circassian War and was dispersed throughout Ottoman Empire due to the mass expulsion of Circassians and the Circassian genocide. In the present day, members of the house can be found throughout the Tuapsinsky District, Krasnodar Krai, Russia and Republic of Turkey.

Currently, none of the members of House Kuadzhe who live in Turkey uses their original family name due to the Surname Law of the Republic of Turkey as none of the ethnic minorities at that time were allowed to use non-Turkish surnames. Due to being spread throughout the Republic of Turkey and having no contact with each other, members of House Kuadzhe chose different surnames than one another.

As such is the case with all other Circassian houses, – be they peasant, pirate, knight or prince houses – House Kuadzhe has its own tamga, but as such is the case with some Circassian houses, it doesn't have one but three. This is usually due to the house being overexpanded and divided into smaller groups. Despite bearing the same family name, these groups chose different banners than one another, to avoid confusion.

== Etymology ==
Traditionally, hereditary names of Circassians were associated with the name of the area, the origin of which was one of the ancestors or with the name of the ancestor. Later nicknames arose from the name of the profession, social status or the title of an ancestor. Most likely it seems that the generic name of Kuadzhe belongs to the oldest type of surnames that have come from the "geographical" name of the ancestor. This type of surname was formed from names given to ancestors in connection with their place of birth, residence or nationality. In the vocabulary of the Circassian language, the word kuadzhe (Adyghe: Къуаджэ) means hamlet. In most cases, kuadzhe was referred to the recently emerged settlement, which did not have an official name and people who emerged from it were not deep-rooted. Proceeding from this, it can be assumed that the name of House Kuadzhe was most likely obtained by a resident of such a village. It is possible that Kuadzhe was called an immigrant from a village who came to a neighbouring city for work or moved to the city for permanent residence.

At the same time, it is possible that the family name goes back to the name of the ancestor "Kua" in the Ubykh language (an extinct language belonging to Northwest Caucasian languages), given the location of House Kuadzhe's emergence. Thus, the surname of Kuadzhe, formed with the help of the family suffix "-dzhe", takes the form of a patronymic and relates to the son's family, pointing to the grandchildren of the originator of the family. Over time, the name of Kuadzhe became a family affair and was officially registered as a family name. The family accepting the personal nickname of the ancestor as its generic name means that the ancestor of House Kuadzhe was a great authority for the household, as well as a well-known and respected person in his native settlement.

Since the process of formation of names was quite long, at the moment it is difficult to talk about the exact place and time of the origin of the name "Kuadzhe". However, we can confidently say that it is one of the oldest family names.
