= Louis-Auguste Juvénal des Ursins d'Harville =

French general (1749–1815)

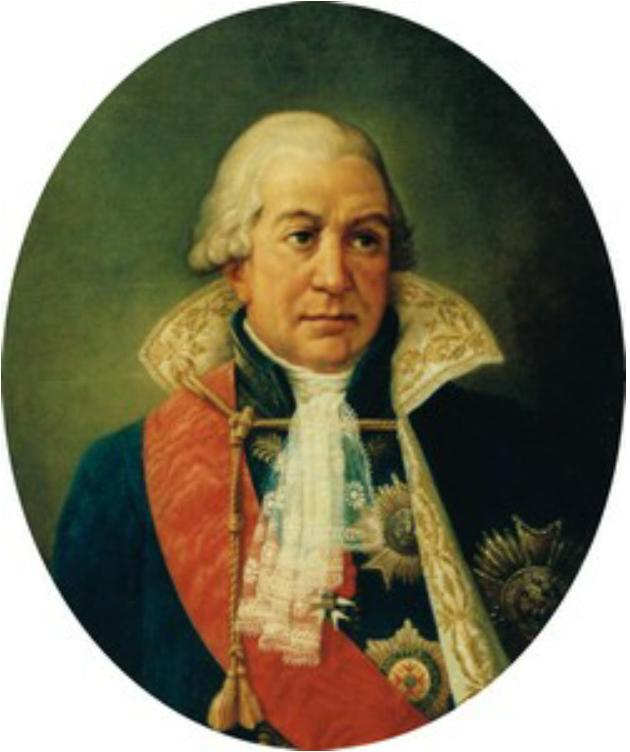
- Count of Harville, Marquis of Traînel, & Doue
- Born: 23 April 1749; Paris, France
- Died: 8 May 1815 (aged 66); Harville or Lizy-sur-Ourcq, France
- Burial place: Doue, France
- Military career
- Allegiance: Kingdom of France (Constitutional Cabinet of Louis XVI) Kingdom of France; France; French Empire; Kingdom of France(1814)
- Branch: Gendarmerie, Cavalry
- Service years: November 25, 1766 – November 18, 1801
- Rank: Divisional General
- Conflicts: French Revolutionary Wars; Napoleonic Wars
- Awards: Order of Saint Louis, Legion of Honour, Order of the Golden Eagle
- Other work: Senator, Peer of France

Louis-Auguste Juvénal des Ursins d'Harville, Count of Harville (German pronunciation: [lwi oɡyst ʒyvenal dez‿yʁsɛ̃ daʁvil]; 23 April 1749 – 8 May 1815) was a French military officer and politician in late 18th-century France. A Divisional General in the French Revolutionary Wars and the Napoleonic Wars, he was present at the Battle of Jemappes on 6 November 1792 and led the Reserve Division at the subsequent Siege of Namur.

== Family origins ==
The origins of the general's family are found in the Third Crusade. The earliest reference to the family is from 1191, when a certain Simon de Harville is recorded as having been in the city of Acre. Another Simon de Harville, possibly a different one, is known by the charters since Simon de Harville, Knight, living in 1223. Around the year 1360, Pierre, the son of Simon, moved from Harville in Beauce to Les Bordes, today part of La Celle-les-Bordes. In the year 1383, Guillaume I de Harville was a falconer for Louis of France, Count of Valois, Duke of Orleans, brother of King Charles VI. He married Jeanne de Voise, and had issue.

His son, Guillaume II, écuyer, seigneur de Champhoudry et des Bordes, Echanson du Roi, built the Château des Bordes, which is still standing. He married Jeanne Le Brun in 1397, and was killed in the Battle of Agincourt in 1415, along with his brother-in-law, Jacques Le Brun. Guillaume III de Harville was born in 1399. His mother inherited the fief of Palaiseau when her brother died, but it passed to the English king for several years before being returned. He married on August 8, 1436 to Anne de Coustes, sister of Louis de Coustes, who testified at the trial of Saint Joan of Arc. For being one of the few knights in Île-de-France who remained loyal to King Charles VII of France, he would be raised to a baron in 1436. He died around 1470.

Anne-Esprit de Harville, the grandson of Guillaume III, was colonel du régiment des légionnaire de Normandie. In 1553, he was inducted into the Order of Saint Michael. His son, Claude, a courtier, advisor, and friend of Henry IV of France built the Château de La Celle in 1610. He fought in the Battle of Ivry, and took part in the capture of Corbeil in 1590. He was also a vice admiral of the French royal navy. He is buried in the Church of Saint Martin in Palaiseau. Despite his military successes, he was tragically predeceased by three sons. There is a portrait of him hanging in the dining room of the Château which he had built.

Claude's grandson, François, became in 1650 the heir his grand-uncle, François II Jouvenel des Ursins. He had a prestigious military career, attaining the rank of Maréchal des camp, and posts such as Gouverneur des ville et citadelle de Charleville et Mont-Olympe. His son, Esprit Jouvenel de Harville des Ursins, was Maréchal des camp in 1704, and in 1710, became Lieutenant-général des Armées du Roi.

His grandson, Claude-Constant-Esprit Jouvenel des Ursins d'Harville, married in 1744 to Marie-Antoinette Goyon de Matignon, the daughter of Thomas, son of the celebrated Marshal of France, Charles-Auguste. He also had a distinguished military career. He was Capitaine de cavalerie au régiment Dauphin, taking part in the Battle of Fontenoy in 1745, and the capture of the Electorate of Hanover and subsequent French defeat in the Battle of Minden in 1759. In 1773, he founded the coal mining company Compagnie des mines d'Aniche, which became of the most important mining companies of France, lasting until it was nationalized by the French government after World War II. He became a Knight Commander of Order of Saint Louis and a Knight Grand Cross in 1781.

== Life before the revolution ==
He began his military career very young, according to Vuillemin. On November 25, 1766 he was commissioned as a Second Lieutenant in the Corps Royal des Carabiniers. He worked his way up through the ranks, becoming a Major in the Gendarmerie in 1786, a Field Marshal in 1788, and a Lieutenant-General in the Army of the North in 1792. As a member of an ancient French noble family dating back to the Second Crusade, he entered the gendarmerie at a young age. His father was Claude II Constant-Esprit Juvénal des Ursins d'Harville, Marquis de Traînel (1722–1794). Through his fourth great-grandmother, Catherine Jouvenel des Ursins, daughter of Christophe Jouvenel des Ursins and Madeleine de Luxembourg he was a cognatic descendant of the House of Luxembourg-Ligny a cadette branch of the House of Luxembourg.

== Military career ==
The nobility had a privileged place in French society, and many political and military positions were traditionally restricted to men of high birth. According to a period account (which can be found George Sand's autobiography), the Count had been a little indifferent and hesitant at the Battle of Jemappes while under the command of Dumouriez. Under the reign of Napoleon, he was a Knight of Honour (chevalier d'honneur), and first squire(premier écuyer) and lord-in-waiting of the Empress Joséphine. In 1808, he was made a Comte d'Empire, though his had father received the higher honour, Honneur de la Cour a generation before.

== Arrest and trial ==
After the defection of Dumouriez in April 1793, the Count became suspect and was arrested at the request of Laurent Lecointre. On 15 April 1793 he was brought before the Revolutionary Tribunal, accused of being involved in the defection of the General-in-Chief. Referred to the Committee of Public Safety, the Count of Harville was accused by Robert and defended by Guillemardet and Camille Desmoulins, who obtained his freedom.

== Travels and political career ==
Louis-Auguste travelled extensively throughout his life, going to Württemberg, Aachen, Italy, and Munich. He was a Sénateur in the Sénat conservateur in the First French Empire. He voted for the deposition of Napoleon and later supported the Bourbon Restoration, and on 4 June 1814, he became a Peer of France.

== Marriage and family ==
On 6 May 1766, he was married to Marie-Henriette-Augustine-Renée d'Alpozzo, Marquise de La Trousse (1748–19 January 1836), daughter of Monsieur del Pozzo, Marquis de La Trousse. In 1778, they got a séparation de biens(separation of property), but still remained on good terms. In Sand's Story of My Life, he is said to have entered a deep depression sometime during the late 1790s, which may have resulted from him having been imprisoned, or the deaths of two people close to him: his aunt, Elisabeth-Louise, and his brother-in-law, Jean-René Henri de Chasteigner, both of whom were executed by Guillotine in July 1794.

== Patrilineal descent ==
Patrilineal descent

The Patrilineal Descent of General Louis-Auguste Juvénal des Ursins d'Harville

1. Simon I de Harville (Participated in the Third Crusade)
2. Simon II de Harville fl. 1223
3. Guillaume I Pierre-Philippe de Harville fl. 1325–1360
4. Guillaume II de Harville d. 1415
5. Guillaume III de Harville c. 1399 – 1498
6. Fiacre de Harville c. 1470 – 1530
7. Anne-Esprit de Harville c. 1530 – 1569
8. Claude de Harville 1555–1636
9. Antoine de Harville 1585-??
10. François de Harville 1630–1701
11. Esprit Juvénal des Ursins d'Harville d.9/9/1720
12. Claude I Constant-Espirt Juvénal des Ursins d'Harville d. 7/11/1726
13. Claude II Constant-Esprit Juvénal des Ursins d'Harville 1722–1794
14. Louis-Auguste Juvénal des Ursins d'Harville 1749–1815

== Notable ancestors ==
- Guillaume II de Harville, Seigneur de Palaiseau, died at the Battle of Agincourt on 25 October 1415.
- Claude de Harville (1555–1636) built the Château de La Celle (La Celle-les-Bordes) in 1610.
- Louis de Luxembourg, Count of Saint-Pol (cognatically, the 8th great-grandfather of Louis-Auguste)
- Guillaume Jouvenel des Ursins, Justice Minister of France.

== Luxembourg connection ==
As stated above, the General descended from a cadet line of the House of Luxembourg, through Madeleine, daughter of Anthony II, and her daughter, Catherine, who married Claude de Harville (1555–1636). The agnatic line of the cadet branch of Brienne became extinct in 1616 and the rights of the House of Luxembourg would have passed cognatically through Madeleine to her son, François II Jouvenel des Ursins (died 1650), thus forming another cadet branch. He left no issue though, and the rights then passed once more collaterally through his sister, then to either Antoine (who may have been named after Anthony II) or to Francis, who adopted the arms and received the titles of his grand-uncle.
