= Brigitte Billaud-Varenne =

Freed slave

- Occupation: Concubine
- Spouse(s): Jacques-Nicolas Billaud-Varenne

Brigitte Billaud-Varenne, also known as Virginie Billaud-Varenne, (?-after 1874) was a Black Guadeloupean slave freed by Jacques-Nicolas Billaud-Varenne, who took her as his concubine. Brought to Billaud-Varenne by the Swiss slave trader Siéger or Siégert, who supplied him with slaves during his exile, she was only a child at the time. Billaud-Varenne, who called her Virginie, made her his concubine and kept her by his side to serve him. After the revolutionary's death in 1819, who left all his belongings to her, she lived at least until 1874.

She was used as an example, particularly in art, to illustrate the hypocrisy of the revolutionary with whom she shared a part of her life, being both an abolitionist and a slaveholder.

== Biography ==
Her life is unknown before she was transported to Cayenne from Guadeloupe by the Swiss slave trader Siéger or Siégert, who sold her to his friend Jacques-Nicolas Billaud-Varenne. While the French biographer of the politician, Arthur Conte, described her as having "quickly won over his lonely heart", in reality, she was brought on a slave ship while she was still just a child. She attempted to suicide during the travel by throwing herself in the water. Billaud made her his concubine, despite being thirty years her senior. Although he theorically freed her, he used her to perform all the household chores, including cooking, managing the livestock and garden, and overseeing the other Black slaves he acquired from his friend. She was named Brigitte, but he called her Virginie. She accompanied Billaud-Varenne during his trip to the United States.

This situation is surprising, given that Billaud-Varenne was one of the abolitionists during the French Revolution and supported the 1794 abolition of slavery, one of the earliest in human history. However, he never seemed to express any remorse or moral concerns regarding his involvement in slavery, whether with Brigitte or more generally with all his slaves.

After his death in 1819, in his will, he bequeathed all his possessions to Brigitte, and expressed it as follows in his will: "I give this surplus, whatever its value may be, to this honest girl; as much to repay her for the immense services she has rendered me for over eighteen years as to acknowledge the new and most complete proof of her unwavering attachment, by consenting to follow me wherever I go." She was unable to sign the will because she could not write and had to be replaced by a notary, who signed on her behalf. It appears that with the few remaining assets of Billaud-Varenne, she managed to acquire a small house in Port-au-Prince.

Much younger than him, she died after 1874, the year she was noted as still living in Haiti. She played a significant role in preserving the documents of her former master, which she sold to a private collector during the 19th century.

== Legacy ==
=== Art ===
She is depicted in Alejo Carpentier's work, notably in Explosion in a Cathedral, where the author highlights Billaud-Varenne's hypocrisy by portraying her nude, in an erotic pose, reading a revolutionary newspaper.
