= Great Book of the Public Debt =

1792 French ledger of state debt

The Great Book of the Public Debt (French: Grand-livre de la dette publique) was created by the Revolutionary French Government in 1792 as a consolidation of all the states debts. It was Joseph Cambon who made the initial suggestion for the state debt to be "rendered republican and uniform" and it was he who proposed to convert all the contracts of the creditors of the state into an inscription in a great book, which should be called the "Great Book of the Public Debt".

The post revolutionary government of Louis XVIII continued to use the Great Book of the Public Debt and it is an integral part of the Fourth Convention (Private Claims upon France) attached to the Paris Peace Treaty of 1815.
