= Agericus of Verdun =

French bishop (c. 521 – 588)

Bishop of Verdun
- Born: c. 521; Harville, Meuse, France
- Died: 1 December 588; Verdun, Meuse, France
- Venerated in: Catholic Church, Eastern Orthodox Church
- Major shrine: Verdun Cathedral
- Feast: 8 February (Diocese of Verdun), 1 December (elsewhere)

Agericus of Verdun (also known as Saint Agericus, Airy or Aguy; Latin: Agericus, 521-588) was the tenth Bishop of Verdun and an advisor to King Childebert II of Austrasia.

== Biography ==
Born to a modest peasant family in 521 in Harville near Verdun, whose parents had prayed for many years to be given a child. He was delivered in a wheat field where his mother was working. King Thierry I, who was hunting nearby, was present at his baptism and acted as his godfather. He was given the name Agericus, meaning "field" or "rural" (rendered in French as Airy).

The king took an interest in Agericus' education, recognizing his intellectual promise in both humanistic and religious studies. At the age of 30, Agericus devoted himself to the ecclesiastical state.

He was ordained as a priest by Saint Désiré of Verdun, the ninth Bishop of Verdun. At the age of 34, following the death of his mentor, Agericus became bishop. He became known for his charitable works, particularly in aiding the poor and educating the people.

He was praised by Venantius Fortunatus and Gregory of Tours. Agericus played a significant role at the court of King Sigebert I of Austrasia (561–575) and his son and successor, Childebert II (570–596).

He died on 1 December 588.

== Veneration ==
He was buried in Saint-Martin Chapel, which he had built and which was later renamed in his honor. His remains were later transferred to Verdun Cathedral, where, until the last century, several of his personal belongings were preserved, including a wooden spoon with an ivory-inlaid handle and two ivory-handled knives.

The Benedictine Abbey of Saint Agericus in Verdun was established over his tomb in 1037.

Hugh of Flavigny wrote a Vita Agerici

Saint Agericus is also credited with founding Saint-Sauveur Hospital, the first hospice in Verdun, with the earliest known historical mention dating to 1093.

His feast day is on 8 February in the Diocese of Verdun and on 1 December elsewhere.

== Miracles ==
Miracles attributed to Saint Agericus include:

- The legend of Saint Agericus' barrel, from where his device of a barrel derives
- In Laon, he miraculously freed a condemned prisoner, securing his pardon.
- In Verdun, he rebuilt a chapel dedicated to Saint John the Baptist.
- After a divine revelation, he discovered the remains of previous bishops of Verdun, including Saint Maur, Saint Salvin, and Saint Arateur, buried in that same chapel.
- He had their remains enshrined in reliquaries and ordered the construction of a new church dedicated to Saint Médard, the Bishop of Noyon.
