= Jean-Baptiste Robert Lindet =

French revolutionary (1746–1825)

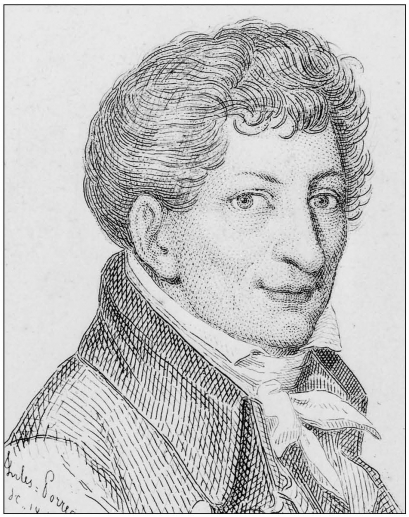
- Jean-Baptiste Robert Lindet

41st President of the National Convention
- In office 20 April – 6 May 1794
- Preceded by: Jean-Pierre-André Amar
- Succeeded by: Lazare Carnot

Personal details
- Born: 2 May 1746 Bernay, Eure, Kingdom of France
- Died: 16 February 1825 (aged 78) Paris, France
- Party: The Mountain
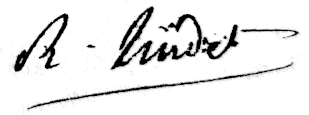
- Signature

Jean-Baptiste Robert Lindet (2 May 1746 – 17 February 1825) was a French politician of the Revolutionary period. His brother, Robert Thomas Lindet, became a constitutional bishop and member of the National Convention. Although his role may not have been spectacular, Jean-Baptiste Lindet came to be the embodiment of the growing middle class that came to dominate French politics during the Revolution.

== Early career ==
Born at Bernay (Eure), he worked in the town as a lawyer before the Revolution. He acted as procureur-syndic of the district of Bernay during the session of the National Constituent Assembly. Appointed deputy to the Legislative Assembly and subsequently to the Convention, he became well known.

Initially close to the Girondists, Lindet was very hostile to King Louis XVI, provided a Rapport sur les crimes imputés à Louis Capet (20 December 1792) – a report of the king's alleged crimes – and voted for the king's execution without appeal.

He was instrumental in the establishment of the Revolutionary Tribunal, and contributed to the downfall of the Girondists. His proposal for the Tribunal had passed with support from Georges Danton, despite the opposition of Pierre Victurnien Vergniaud.

== Rapport sur les crimes imputés à Louis Capet ==
Jean-Baptiste Robert Lindet, being a member of the Commission of Twenty-one, had an instrumental role in the execution of Louis XVI and drew up the accusation in the acte enonciatif. He worked incessantly on the project, and became sleep-deprived to the point of exhaustion and was forced to take to his bed. At the time of trial, Lindet was to have Charles Barbaroux read the document, due to his fatigue.

Lindet wrote his accusation as a chronological retelling of the treasonous acts of the King, beginning in May 1789 and spanning until 10 August 1792. Beginning with the eve of the calling of the Estates-General, Lindet argued that Louis intended to use the representatives to raise money for the bankrupt crown, and then send them on their way with few reforms. When this did not prove effective, Louis resorted to the use of military force, which catalyzed the storming of the Bastille, and the movement of the King to Paris. From this point, he focused on the counter-revolutionary actions of the King as showcased by the discovery of the Armoire de fer (Iron Cupboard), proving that the king was duplicitous. By the summer of 1792, Lindet argued that Louis had realized his counter-revolutionary efforts had proved futile, and he would have to take military action. He provoked the insurrection of 10 August, with the gathering of troops at the Tuileries, and when he saw his imminent defeat the Swiss were left to die for an undeserving king. Lindet would be known to have a strong opinion in this matter because during the Insurrection, he actually worked to help a Swiss guard escape. In his accusation against the king, Lindet focused strongly on his duplicity and betrayal against the actions of the French Revolution. His acte enonciatif characterized the views of the Montagnards, and also violated the Criminal Code of 1791. Another inconsistency in the trial of Louis was that the argument presented against him by Lindet disregarded any account of the Revolutionary violence against the King, thus presenting his accusation as a series of inexcusable crimes against the Revolution.

== Committee and Terror ==
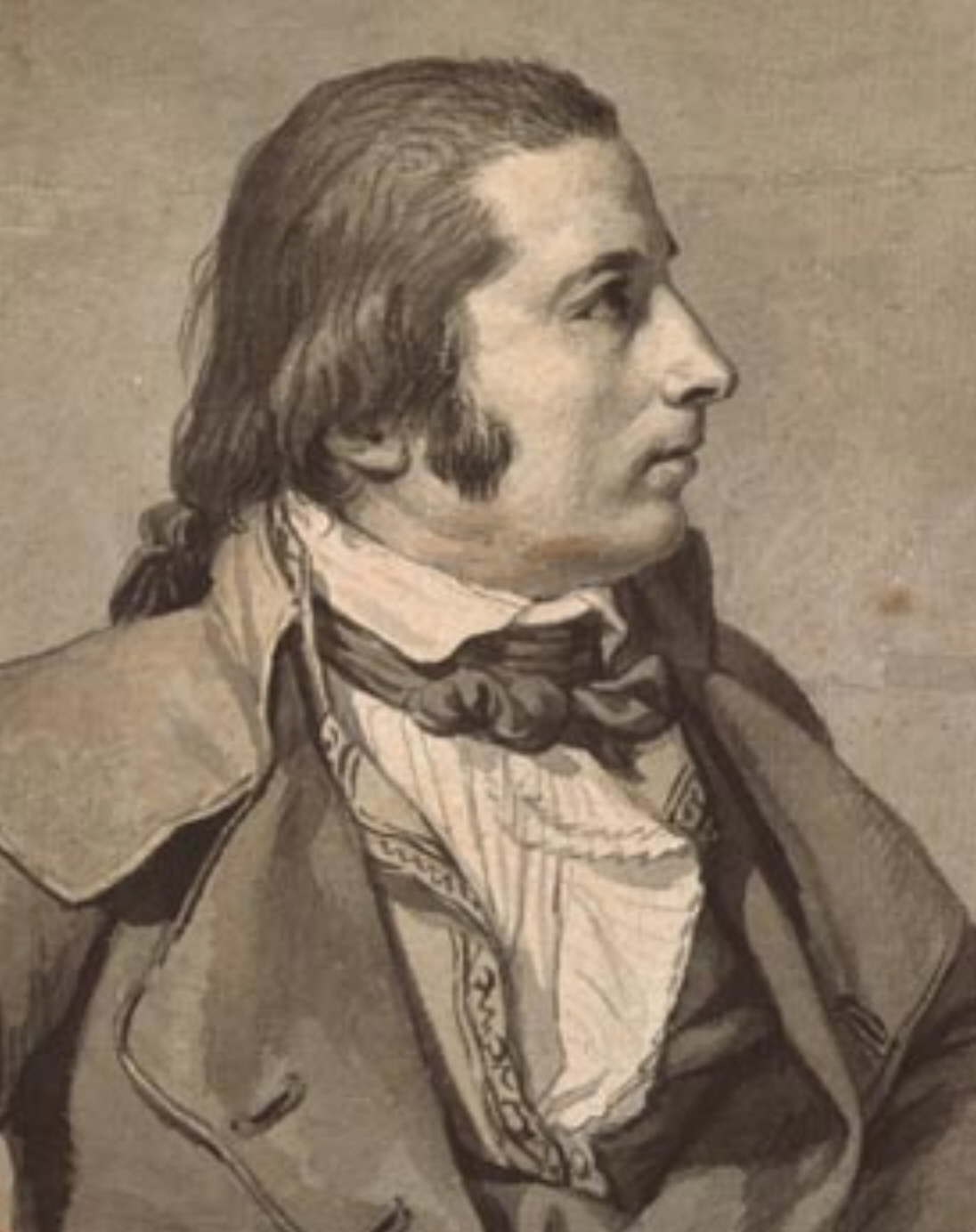
Presumed portrait of Jean-Baptiste Robert Lindet

He became a substitute member of the Committee of Public Safety on 6 April 1793, and soon replaced the ill Jean Antoine Debry. All members of the Committee of Public Safety belonged to bourgeoisie of the ancien regime, were Montagnards, and all had ample experience serving apprenticeships in previous years assemblies or in high offices of state. Lindet was unique in the demographics of the Committee of Public Safety, in that he was forty-six, where the average age of the members was thirty.

Very concerned by the question of food supplies, he showed his administrative talent in coping with the issue. Lindet was the department head, or the "examiner" of the National Food Commission. The National Food Commission was mainly in charge of economic measures and more specifically was responsible for the provision of subsistence, clothing, and transportation. This body consisted of over 500 members at the height of the Reign of Terror, and would often send these members out for tasks and the gathering of intelligence. For one of these missions, Lindet was sent to the districts of Rhône, Eure, Calvados and Finistère, for the purpose of suppressing revolts. He was successful and was able to enact a conciliatory policy. The National Food Commission also functioned to supervise agricultural and industrial production, was given control of the labor force for war effort, put in charge of controlling trade, and most importantly, the enforcement of the Law of Maximum.

Without being formally opposed to Maximilien Robespierre, he did not support him, and he was, with Philippe Rühl of the Committee of General Security, one of the only two members of the two Committees who did not sign the order for the execution of Danton and his party. When asked to do so, he had replied to Louis de Saint-Just: "I am here to protect citizens, and not to murder patriots".

== Thermidor and Directory ==
He also opposed the Thermidorian Reaction of July 1794, and defended Bertrand Barère de Vieuzac, Jacques Nicolas Billaud-Varenne, and Collot d'Herbois from the accusations made against them on 22 March 1795. Himself denounced on 20 May, Lindet was defended by his brother Thomas, but only escaped condemnation by the vote of amnesty of the 4 Brumaire, year IV (26 October 1795).

The French Directory offered Lindet the opportunity to become its spy in Basel, but he turned down the mission. After taking part in the Conspiracy of Equals in 1796, he faced trial and was acquitted. He then was elected to the Council of Five Hundred (by Eure and Seine), but was not allowed to occupy his seat. However, he served as Minister of Finance from 18 June to 9 November 1799.

== Later life ==
After Napoleon Bonaparte's coup d'état against the Directory, the 18 Brumaire of 1799, he refused to occupy offices of the Consulate (and consequently of the Empire).

In 1816 he was proscribed by the Bourbon Restoration government as a regicide, avoiding a harsher penalty by not having recognized Napoleon during the Hundred Days. Lindet returned to France some time before his death in Paris.

== Bibliography ==
- 1793 - Attentat et crimes de Louis, dernier roi des Français
- 1794 - Projet de décret présenté au nom des Comités de salut public, d'agriculture et de commerce, dans la séance du 14 brumaire
- 1794 - Rapport de Robert Lindet
- 1794 - Réponse de R. Lindet, a ceux qui lui reprochent 1o. d'avoir parlé des événemens du 31 mai dans le mois de juillet 1793, et dans son rapport du quatrième des jours complémentaires, 2o. d'avoir concouru aux décrets portés le 3 octobre contre un grand nombre de membres de la Convention, et de s'être opposé au rapport de ces décrets, 3o. d'avoir pris la défense des quatre membres de l'ancien gouvernement
- 1795 - R. Lindet, représentant du peuple, a la Convention nationale
- 1795 - Compte rendu a la Convention nationale, en exécution de son décret du 21 nivôse dernier, par Robert Lindet, représentant du peuple, des dépenses qu'il a faites dans les différentes missions qu'il a remplies
- 1797 - Robert-Thomas Lindet, représentant du peuple, a la Haute-Cour de justice, sur l'accusation contre Robert Lindet
