= Tilly-sur-Meuse =

- Commune
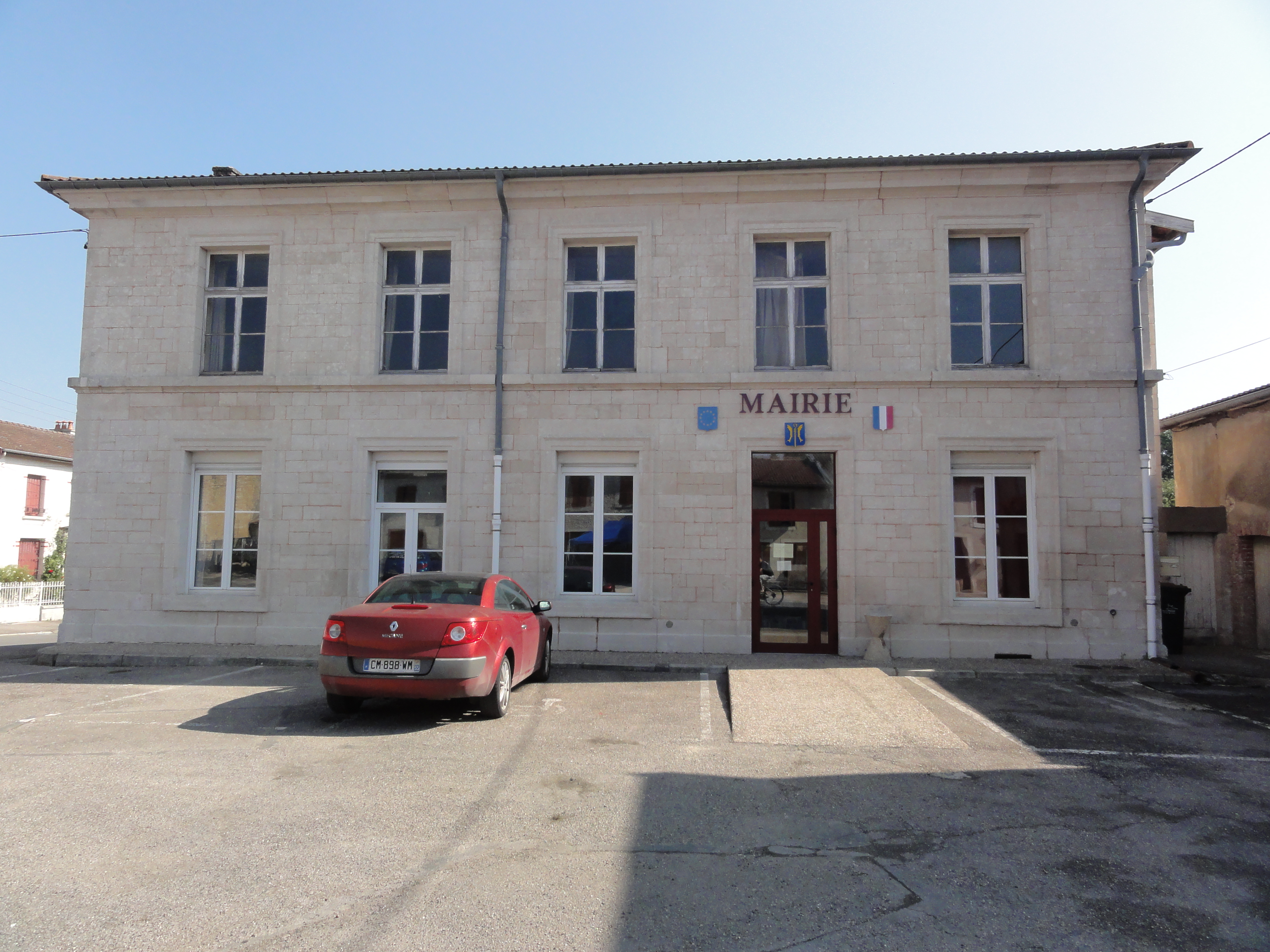
- The town hall in Tilly-sur-Meuse

- Coat of arms
- Location of Tilly-sur-Meuse
- Location within France Location within Grand Est
- Coordinates: 49°00′22″N 5°26′26″E
- Country: France
- Region: Grand Est
- Department: Meuse
- Arrondissement: Verdun
- Canton: Dieue-sur-Meuse
- Intercommunality: Val de Meuse - Voie Sacrée

Government
  - Mayor (2020–2026): Jean-Louis Guerra
- Area^{1}: 13.69 km^{2} (5.29 sq mi)
- Elevation: 213 m (699 ft)
- Highest elevation: 352 m (1,155 ft)
- Lowest elevation: 204 m (669 ft)
- Population (2023): 272
  - Density: 19.9/km^{2} (51.5/sq mi)
- Time zone: UTC+01:00 (CET)
  - Summer (DST): UTC+02:00 (CEST)
- INSEE/Postal code: 55512 /55220
- ^{1} French Land Register data, which excludes lakes, ponds, glaciers > 1 km^{2} (0.386 sq mi or 247 acres) and river estuaries.

Tilly-sur-Meuse is a commune in the Meuse department in Grand Est in north-eastern France.

== See also ==
- Communes of the Meuse department
