= Jacques-Nicolas Billaud-Varenne =

French revolutionary leader (1756–1819)

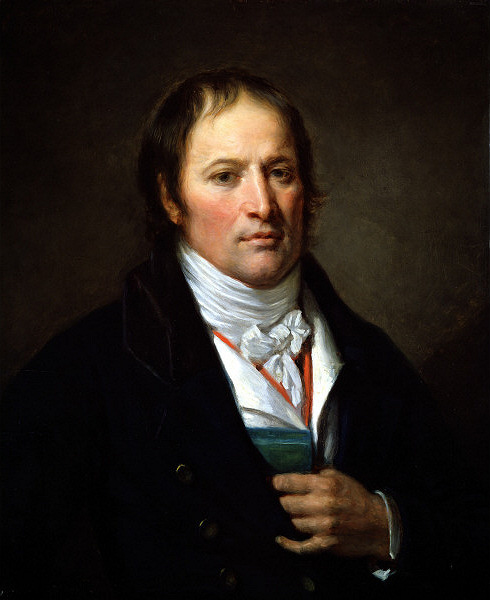
- Billaud-Varenne portrayed by Jean-Baptiste Greuze, c. 1790 (Dallas Museum of Art)

26th President of the National Convention
- In office 5 September 1793 – 19 September 1793
- Preceded by: Maximilien Robespierre
- Succeeded by: Pierre Joseph Cambon

Member of the National Convention
- In office 7 September 1792 – 26 October 1795
- Constituency: Seine

Member of the Committee of Public Safety
- In office 6 September 1793 – 1 September 1794

Personal details
- Born: Jacques Nicolas Billaud; 23 April 1756 La Rochelle, Kingdom of France
- Died: 3 June 1819 (aged 63) Port-au-Prince, Republic of Haiti
- Party: The Mountain
- Spouse(s): Anne-Angélique Doye; Brigitte Billaud-Varenne
- Education: University of Poitiers
- Occupation: Lawyer, politician
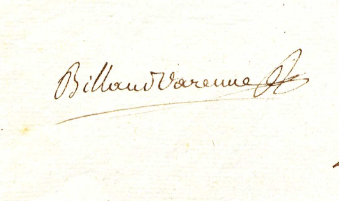
- Signature
- Nickname: "The Tiger"

Jacques-Nicolas Billaud-Varenne (French pronunciation: [ʒak nikɔla bijo vaʁɛn]; 23 April 1756 – 3 June 1819), also known as Jean Nicolas or by his nicknames, the Righteous Patriot or the Tiger, was a French lawyer and a major figure in the French Revolution. A close associate of Georges Danton and Maximilien Robespierre, he was one of the most militant members of the Committee of Public Safety, and is often considered a key architect of the Reign of Terror.

Billaud-Varenne subsequently broke with Robespierre, partly due to their ideological conflicts relating to the centralization of power. Ultimately he played a major role in Robespierre's downfall on 9 Thermidor, an act for which he later expressed remorse. After Thermidor, Billaud-Varenne was part of the Crêtois, the last group of deputies from The Mountain.

Billaud-Varenne was later arrested during the Thermidorian Reaction. Deported to Cayenne without trial, he married a black ex-slave named Brigitte, refused Napoleon's pardon there and finally died in Port-au-Prince in 1819.

Billaud-Varenne was one of the central figures of the first part of the French Revolution, but he remains little studied or little understood.

== Biography ==
=== Early life ===
Billaud-Varenne was born in La Rochelle as the son of a lawyer to the parlement of Paris. Since both his grandfather and father were lawyers, and he was the first son in his direct family, Varenne was guaranteed a solid education and the same profession. Billaud-Varenne was educated at the college at Niort run by the French Oratorians, and took Philosophy at La Rochelle. His education at Niort was particularly important in shaping his character because its methods of teaching were uncommon to the revolution. At Niort, modernity and tolerance were emphasized, as opposed to most other schools of the time. Billaud-Varenne was also sent to another Oratory of Jesus school, the College of Juilly, where he was Hall prefect of studies. Here he later became a professor when he felt dissatisfied with practicing law, remaining for a short while, until his writing of a comédie strained his relationship with those who ran the school and he was obliged to leave in 1785.

He then went to Paris, married and bought a position as lawyer in the parlement. In early 1789 he published at Amsterdam a three-volume work on the Despotisme des ministres de la France, and a well-received anti-clerical text titled "The Last Blow Against Prejudice and Superstition." As events moved closer to Bastille Day, he adopted with enthusiasm the principles of the French Revolution. An example of his beliefs regarding the Church can be found in this text:

However painful an amputation may be, when a member is gangrened it must be sacrificed if we wish to save the body.

=== Early activism ===
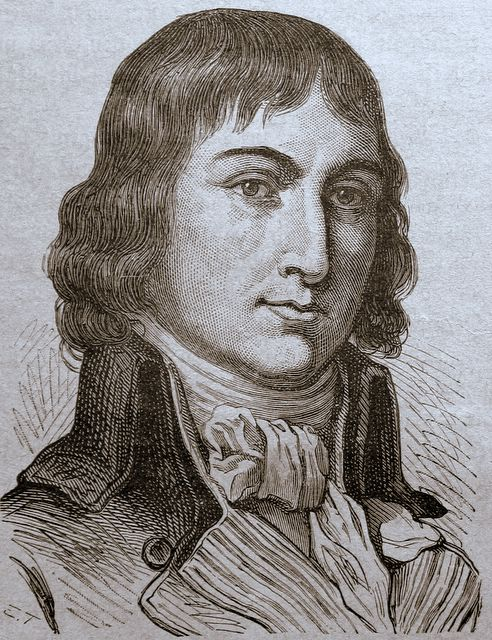
Jean Nicolas Billaud-Varenne

Joining the Jacobin Club, Billaud-Varenne became, from 1790, one of the most violent anti-Royalist orators, closely linked to Jean-Marie Collot d'Herbois. After the flight to Varennes of King Louis XVI, he published a pamphlet, L'Acéphocratie (from the Greek: ακεφοκρατια, meaning 'power without head'), in which he demanded the establishment of a federal republic.

On 1 July, in another speech at the Jacobin Club, he spoke of a republic, arousing the derision of partisans of the constitutional monarchy. But when he repeated his demand for a republic a fortnight later, the speech was printed and sent to the Jacobin branch societies throughout France.

On the night of 10 August 1792 (during the attack on the Tuileries Palace) he met with Danton, Desmoulins, and other members of the Insurrectionary Commune during the critical hours before the overthrow of the monarchy. Later that day, he was elected one of the deputy-commissioners of the sections who shortly afterwards became the general council of the Paris Commune. He was accused of having been an accomplice in the September Massacres in the Abbaye prison.

=== Projects in the Convention ===
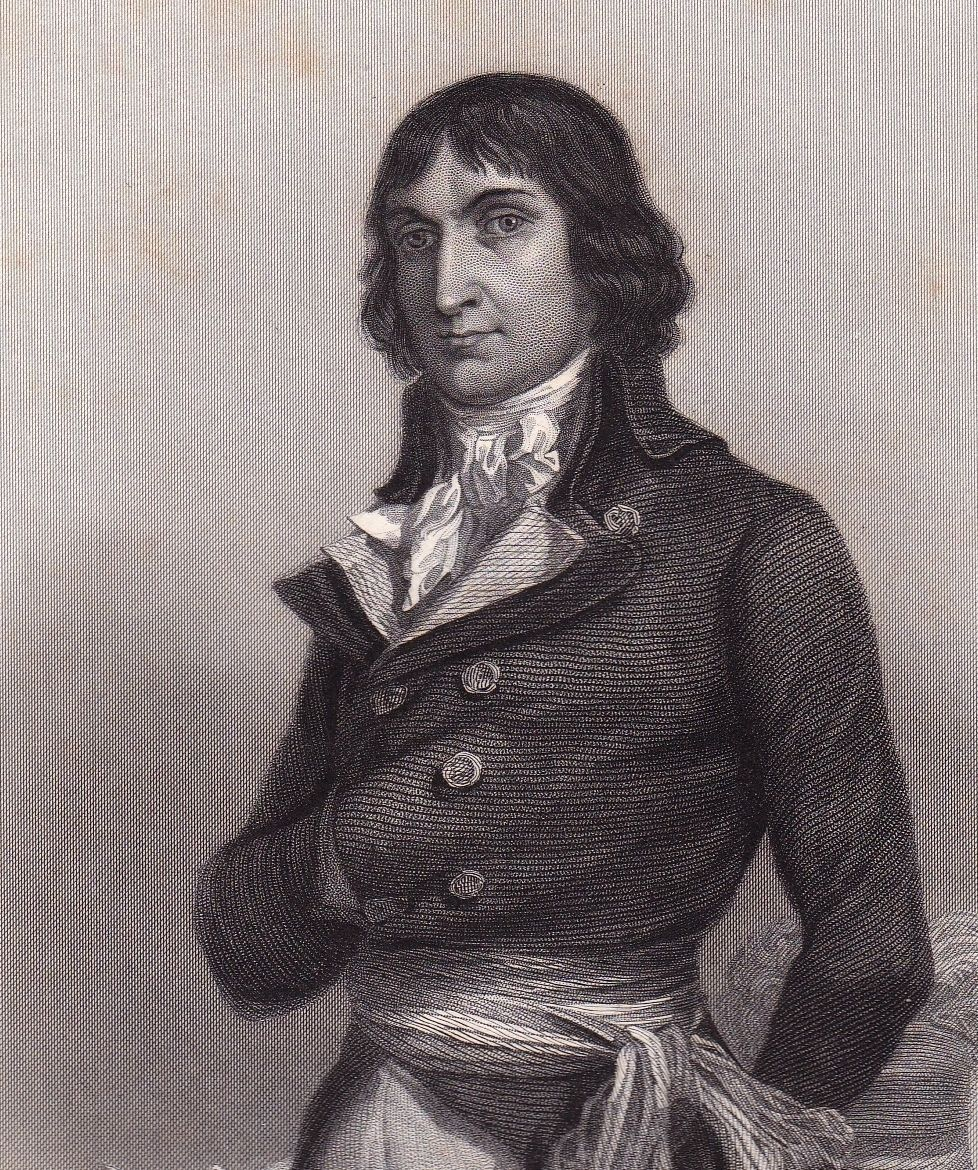
Billaud-Varennes – Auguste Raffet del., Robinson sc., Furne et Coquebert

Elected, like Maximilien Robespierre, Georges Danton, and Collot d'Herbois, a deputy of Paris to the National Convention, he spoke in favour of the immediate abolition of the Bourbon monarchy, and the next day demanded that all acts be dated from the Year I of the French Republic (a measure adopted a little over a year later in the form of the French Revolutionary Calendar).

At the trial of Louis XVI he added new charges to the accusation, proposed to refuse counsel to the king, and voted for death "within 24 hours". On 2 June 1793, in the context of Jean-Paul Marat's anti-Girondist instigations, he proposed a decree of accusation against the Girondists; a week later, at the Jacobin Club, he outlined a programme which the convention was to fulfil soon after: the expulsion of foreigners, the establishment of a tax on the rich, the deprivation of the rights of citizenship of all "anti-social" men, the creation of a French Revolutionary Army, the monitoring of all officers and ci-devant nobles (i.e.: those of aristocratic families who no longer held status after the abolition of feudalism), and the death penalty for unsuccessful generals fighting in the French Revolutionary Wars.

=== Mission and Reign of Terror ===
On 15 July he made a violent speech in the Convention in accusation of the Girondists. Sent in August as representative on mission to the départements of the Nord and of Pas-de-Calais, he showed himself inexorable to all suspects.

On his return, the calamities of the summer of 1793 caused the Paris Commune to begin to organize an insurrection – an insurrection that would lead to Billaud-Varenne's ascension to the most powerful body in all of France. When the popular uprising did come on 5 September and the Commune marched on the National Convention, Billaud-Varenne was one of the chief speakers agitating for change in leadership. He called for a new war plan from the Ministry of War and that a new Committee be created to oversee the whole government – thus superseding the existing Committee of Public Safety. To mollify the insurrectionists, that night Billaud-Varenne was named President of the National Convention for a special two week session, followed by him being named to the Committee of Public Safety the next day. Along with Collot d'Herbois, who was named the same day, his addition was seen as a way to co-opt the Paris Commune. Once added to Committee of Public Safety, he then played a major role in defending it – calling for unity instead of change – on 25 October when the National Convention complained about the committee and then officially sanctioned them. He was included in the Reign of Terror's Committee of Public Safety, which had decreed the mass arrest of all suspects and the establishment of a revolutionary army, caused the extraordinary criminal tribunal to be named officially "Revolutionary Tribunal" (on 29 October 1793), demanded the execution of Marie Antoinette, and then attacked Jacques René Hébert and Danton. Meanwhile, he published Les Éléments du républicanisme, in which he demanded a division of property among the citizens.

Once named to the committee, Billaud-Varenne became a vocal defender of that body. Based in Paris during much of this year, Billaud-Varenne and Barère worked to develop the administrative apparatus and consolidate the power of the committee. To that end, in early December he proposed a radical centralization of authority, a law that became known as the Law of 14 Frimaire. This law brought surveillance, economic requisition, the dispatch of legislative news, local administrators, and representatives on mission under the control of the committee. He was also instrumental in defending the Terror: when a measure was passed into law in mid November 1793 allowing the accused the right of defense, Billaud-Varenne uttered his famous words in defense of the Terror:

No, we will not step backward, our zeal will only be smothered in the tomb; either the revolution will triumph or we will all die.

The law enabling right of defense was overturned the next day.

=== Thermidor and exile ===
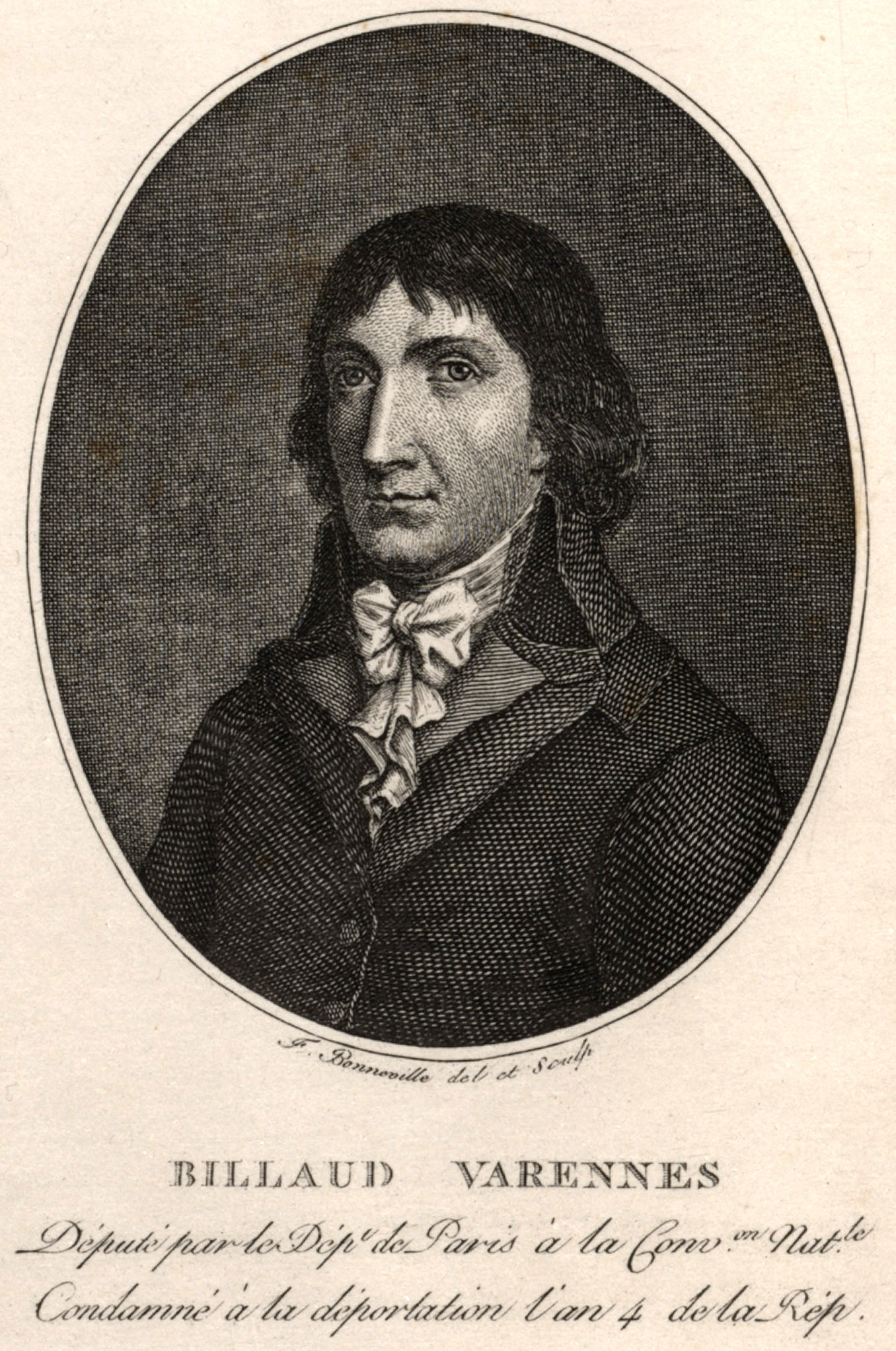
Billaud-varenne

As 1794 progressed, Robespierre began to speak out against over zealous factions: he believed both pro-Terror and indulgent positions were dangerous to the well-being of the Revolution. Robespierre saw danger in members of the Revolution, like Billaud-Varenne, Collot d'Herbois, and Marc-Guillaume Alexis Vadier who had been too committed to attacks on Church property or had been too vigorous in their pursuit of revolutionary justice (such as Collot at Lyon). The dechristianization program was seen as divisive and unnecessary by some in the convention. Furthermore, the law of 22 Prairial had isolated the police wing of the convention: the Committee of General Security, a body that was extremely anti-clerical, had seen their power severely diminished by the law. The law of 22 Prairial reduced the right of defense to simply an appearance before court, while greatly expanding the list of crimes punishable by death. This is what led directly to the Great Terror, in which more were killed by the Revolutionary Tribunal in Paris in those seven weeks than in the preceding fourteen months. Though Billaud-Varenne publicly defended it in the convention, this law was a driving factor in the eventual reprisal against the committee. Serious arguments began to fracture the committee, with Billaud-Varenne and Collot d'Herbois pitted against Robespierre and Saint-Just. On 26 June, they argued over the imposition of a new prosecutor to the Revolutionary Tribunal. On 29 June, an argument once again broke out between members of the Committee of Public Safety. Though it could have been about the Catherine Théot affair or the law of 22 Prairial, it led to Billaud-Varenne branding Robespierre a dictator and the latter storming out of the Committee headquarters and ceasing to attend meetings. With tensions being heightened and more guillotined every day – the rate of executions per day in Paris rose from five a day in Germinal to twenty-six a day in Messidor – Billaud-Varenne and Collot d'Herbois began to fear for their safety.

Throughout the early days of Thermidor, Bertrand Barère attempted to forge compromise between the splintering Committee. However, Robespierre was still convinced that the Convention needed further purging, and on 8 Thermidor he rose before that body to give a speech that would spark the Thermidorian Reaction. Speaking of "monsters" that threatened the Republic with conspiracy, his speech was pointed enough to serve as a warning while being vague enough to worry many in the body. When he was asked for the names of those in the conspiracy, Robespierre declined to provide them, and he was charged with indicting members of the Convention en masse without a hearing.

That night, Robespierre retreated to the Jacobin Club, where he gave the same speech to rousing applause. Collot d'Herbois and Billaud-Varenne, as members who the speech may have been aimed at, attempted to defend themselves but were shouted down and expelled from the club as cries for "la guillotine," rained down upon them. They returned to the Committee of Public Safety where they found Saint-Just, the protege of Robespierre, working on a speech he intended to deliver the next day. As one of the chief messengers of the terror, Collot and Billaud-Varenne both assumed that Saint-Just was writing their denunciation. At this moment the last argument of the Committee erupted, with Collot, Billaud-Varenne, and Barère attacking Saint-Just for "dividing the nation." After sometime, they departed the committee and organized the last elements of the Thermidorian Reaction.

The next day, 9 Thermidor, Billaud-Varenne would play a critical role in the final stroke against Robespierre and his allies. As Saint-Just delivered his speech, he was interrupted near the beginning by another conspirator, Jean-Lambert Tallien. Billaud-Varenne was next to speak, with Collot d'Herbois controlling the debates from the President's Chair, and in an eloquent planned denunciation directly accused Robespierre of a conspiracy against the Republic. This speech and others were warmly received, and after continued debate arrest warrants were issued for Robespierre, Saint-Just, and their allies. After a brief armed standoff, the conspirators would carry the day, and Robespierre and his allies would be executed the next day.

However, after 9 Thermidor, Billaud-Varenne was soon enough to find himself in prison. Too closely associated with the excesses of the Reign of Terror, he was shortly attacked himself in the convention for his ruthlessness, and a commission was appointed to examine his conduct and that of some other members of the former Committee of Public Safety. Billaud-Varenne was arrested, and as a result of the Jacobin-led insurrection of 12 Germinal of the Year III (1 April 1795), the Convention decreed his immediate deportation to French Guiana, along with Collot d'Herbois and Bertrand Barère de Vieuzac, where he picked up farming and took as concubine a black slave girl called Brigitte. After Napoleon Bonaparte's 18 Brumaire coup, he refused the pardon offered by the French Consulate. In 1816 he left Guiana, went to New York City for a few months, and finally moved to Port-au-Prince (Haiti), where he became advisor and counsellor to the high court.

President of Haiti, Alexandre Pétion granted him a pension which he received until his death. Regarding the colonization of Haiti by the Kingdom of France and the attempts of Louis XVIII to regain control of the island by diplomatic means, he announced to Pétion :

The biggest fault you committed, in the course of the revolution of this country, is not having sacrificed all the settlers, down to the last one. In France we made the same mistake, by not causing the last of the Bourbons to perish.

He died in Port-au-Prince in 1819. Among his last words, he declared: "My bones, at least, will rest on a land that wants Liberty; but I hear the voice of posterity accusing me of having spared the blood of the tyrants of Europe too much."

He bequeathed all his possessions to his wife, Brigitte, and expressed it as follows in his will: "I give this surplus, whatever its value may be, to this honest girl; as much to repay her for the immense services she has rendered me for over eighteen years as to acknowledge the new and most complete proof of her unwavering attachment, by consenting to follow me wherever I go."

== Works ==
- Despotisme des ministres de France, combattu par les droits de la Nation, par les loix fondamentales, par les ordonnances... [Despotism of the ministers of France, combatted by the rights of the Nation, by the fundamental laws, by the ordinances...] (in French), Paris, 1789
- Mémoires écrits au Port-au-Prince en 1818, contenant la relation de ses voyages et aventures dans le Mexique, depuis 1815 jusqu'en 1817. ("Memoirs written in Port-au-Prince in 1818, containing the relation of his voyages and adventures in Mexico, from 1815 to 1817"), Paris, 1821 [probably forgeries].
- Billaud Varenne membre du comité de salut public : Mémoires inédits et Correspondance. Accompagnés de notices biographiques sur Billaud Varenne et Collot d'Herbois ("Billaud Varenne, member of the Committee of Public Safety: Unpublished memoirs and correspondence. Accompanied by biographical notes on Billaud Varenne and Collot d'Herbois"), Paris, Librairie de la Nouvelle Revue, 1893 (edited by Alfred Begis).

== Sources ==
- Arthur Conte, Billaud Varenne : Géant de la Révolution, Paris, Editions Orban, 1989
- Jacques Guilaine, Billaud-Varenne : l'ascète de la Révolution (1756–1819), Paris, Fayard, 1969
- Auguste Kuscinski: Dictionnaire des conventionnels, Paris, Société de l'Histoire de la Révolution française, F. Rieder, 1916 <New edition: Brueil-en-Vexin, Editions du Vexin français, 1973>
- Robert R. Palmer, Twelve Who Ruled : The Year of the Terror in the French Revolution, Princeton, Princeton University Press, 1941 <New edition: Princeton Classic Editions, 2005. – ISBN 0-691-12187-7>
- Schama, Simon. Citizens: A Chronicle of the French Revolution (New York: Vintage Books, 1989), 809, 840.
- Levitine, George. Culture and Revolution: Cultural Ramifications of the French Revolution (College Park, Maryland: Department of Art History, 1989), 70–79.
- Tom Malone: "Billaud-Varenne – Anwalt des Terrors". BOD, Hamburg 2014, ISBN 978-3-7347-3899-9.
