= Antoine Marie Charles Garnier =

French politician (1742 to 1805)

Antoine Marie Charles Garnier (German pronunciation: [ɑ̃twan maʁi ʃaʁl ɡaʁnje]), commonly referred to as "Garnier de l'Aube" (German pronunciation: [ɡaʁnje də lob], lit. 'Garnier of the Aube'), born on 7 September 1742 in Troyes and died on 9 September 1805 at Blaincourt-sur-Aube (Aube), was a politician during the French Revolution. He took part in the coup, organized by Laurent Lecointre, etc. which led to the Fall of Robespierre. According to some authors, he was the one who launched on 9 Thermidor, when Robespierre was temporarily unable to speak: "It is the blood of Danton that chokes you!". The sentence, however, is sometimes attributed to Louis Legendre. During the Directoire he was a member of the Conseil des Cinq-Cents.
