= Stanislas Joseph François Xavier Rovère =

French politician and general

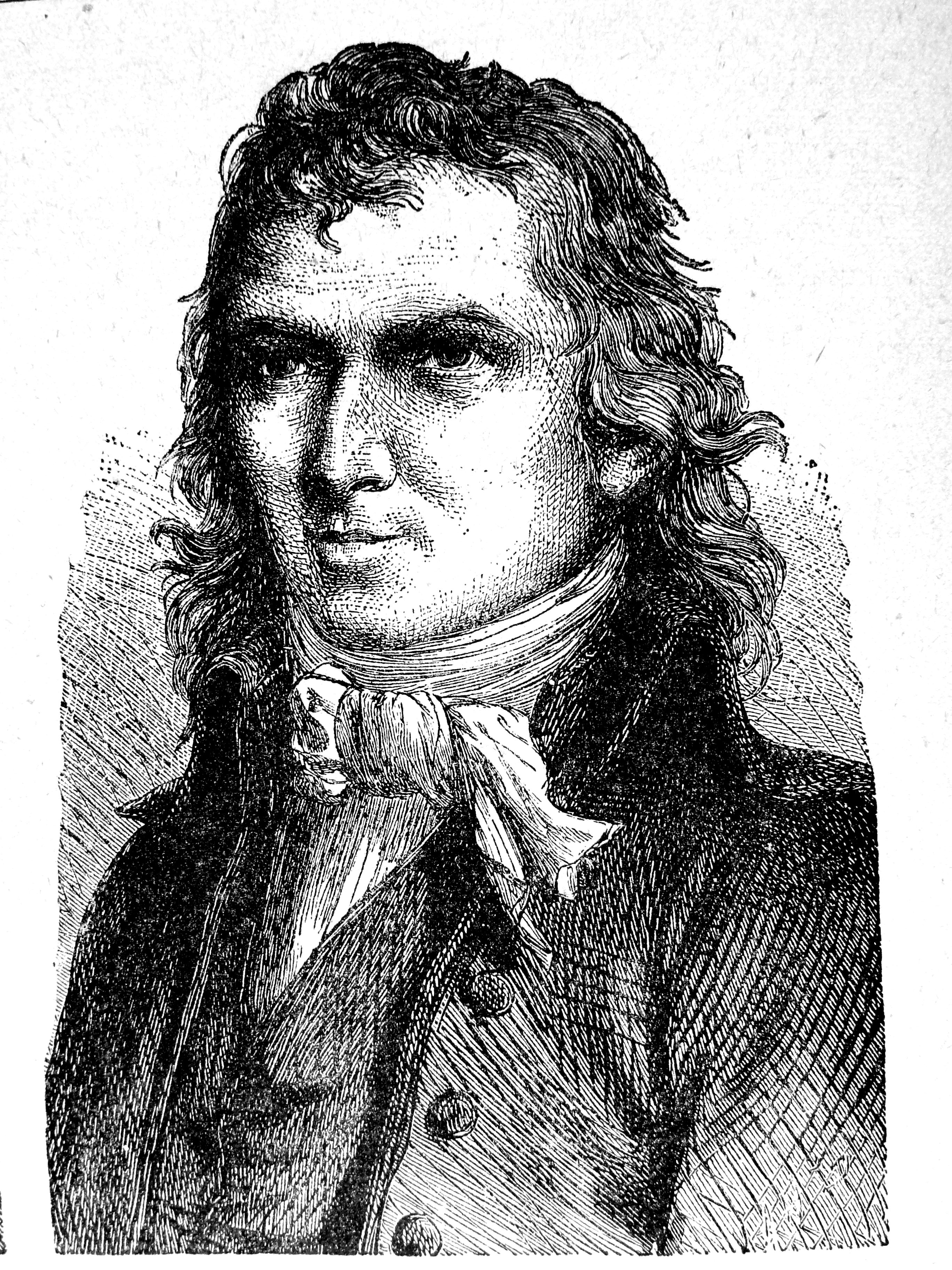
Joseph Stanislas François Xavier Alexis Rovère de Fontvielle

Joseph Stanislas François Xavier Alexis Rovère de Fontvielle (French pronunciation: [ʒozɛf fʁɑ̃swa ɡzavje]; 16 July 1748 – 11 September 1798) was a general and politician of the French Revolution. He was born in Bonnieux (Vaucluse) and died in Sinnamary, French Guiana.

== See also ==
- List of French generals of the Revolutionary and Napoleonic Wars
