= Harville =

- Commune
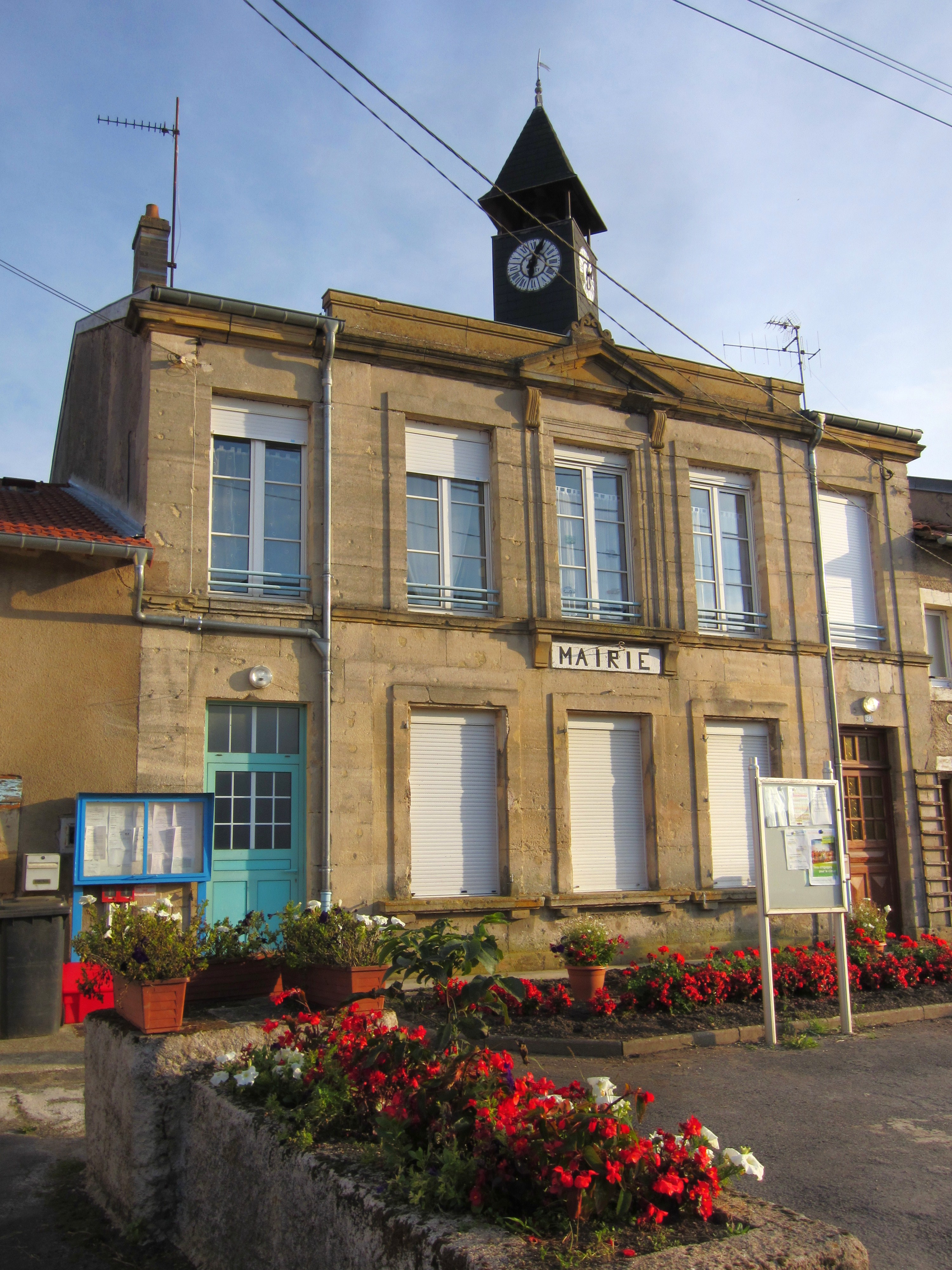
- The town hall in Harville

- Coat of arms
- Location of Harville
- Location within France Location within Grand Est
- Coordinates: 49°05′58″N 5°43′42″E
- Country: France
- Region: Grand Est
- Department: Meuse
- Arrondissement: Verdun
- Canton: Étain
- Intercommunality: Territoire de Fresnes-en-Woëvre

Government
  - Mayor (2023–2026): Jean-François Nottez
- Area^{1}: 5.54 km^{2} (2.14 sq mi)
- Elevation: 210 m (690 ft)
- Highest elevation: 226 m (741 ft)
- Lowest elevation: 200 m (660 ft)
- Population (2023): 112
  - Density: 20.2/km^{2} (52.4/sq mi)
- Time zone: UTC+01:00 (CET)
  - Summer (DST): UTC+02:00 (CEST)
- INSEE/Postal code: 55232 /55160
- ^{1} French Land Register data, which excludes lakes, ponds, glaciers > 1 km^{2} (0.386 sq mi or 247 acres) and river estuaries.

Harville (French pronunciation: [aʁvil]) is a commune in the Meuse department in Grand Est in north-eastern France.

== See also ==
- Communes of the Meuse department
