= Armand-Joseph Guffroy =

French politician and lawyer

Armand-Benoît-Joseph Guffroy (French pronunciation: [aʁmɑ̃ bənwa ʒozɛf ɡyfʁwa]; 10 November 1742 – 9 February 1801) was a lawyer and politician of the French Revolution. He was born at Arras and died in Paris, aged 58.
