= Louis-Marie Stanislas Fréron =

French politician and journalist (1754–1802)

Louis Fréron
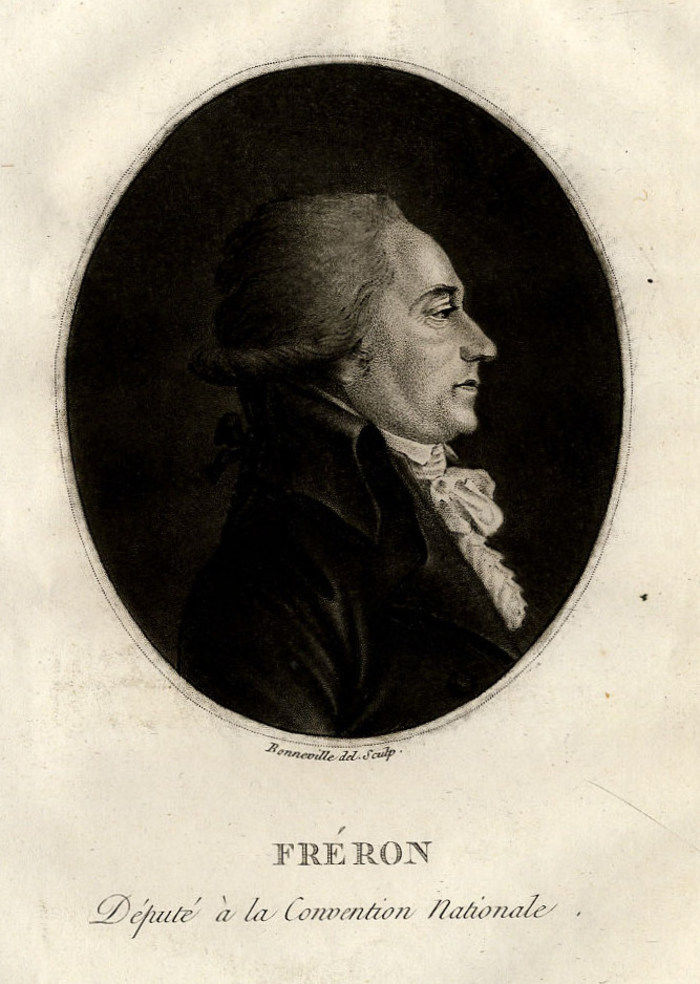

Member of the National Convention
- In office 20 September 1792 – 2 November 1795
- Constituency: Paris

Personal details
- Born: Louis-Marie Stanislas Fréron; 17 August 1754 Paris, France
- Died: 15 July 1802 (aged 47) Saint-Domingue, now Haiti
- Party: The Mountain (1792–1794); Thermidorians (1794–1795)
- Parent(s): Élie Fréron and Thérèse Guyomar
- Education: Lycée Louis-le-Grand
- Profession: Journalist, activist
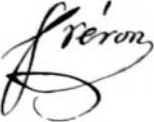
- Signature

Louis-Marie Stanislas Fréron (French pronunciation: [lwi maʁi stanislas fʁeʁɔ̃]; 17 August 1754 – 15 July 1802) was a French politician, journalist, representative to the National Assembly, and a representative on mission during the French Revolution.

== Background ==
The son of Elie-Catherine Fréron, he was born in Paris to a wealthy family. His father was a prominent journalist and popular opponent of the philosophes and encyclopédistes, his most notable opponent being Voltaire (who openly considered Elie his enemy), and it is surmised that his father's history of conflict with the state over freedom of the press heavily influenced Louis Fréron's political views. He attended the Lycée Louis-le-Grand, where his father held a faculty position, together with the likes of Maximilien Robespierre and Camille Desmoulins. On the death of his father, he inherited L'Année littéraire, which was continued until 1795 and edited successively by the abbé Royou and Julien Louis Geoffroy.

== Early Revolutionary activities ==
Though due to legal obligations he still had some affiliation with L'Année littéraire, Fréron took up writing and editing his paper L'Orateur du Peuple. In it, he wrote radical denunciations of counter-revolutionaries much like those written by Jean-Paul Marat and Camille Desmoulins, and in fact the three of them aided each other in editing their papers. His first real taste of rabble-rousing came in the form of collaboration with Desmoulins to incite the storming of the Bastille.

Soon after, he was elected as representative to the Bonne-Nouvelle district of the newly formed Paris Commune, where it seems he was minimally active before returning to his role as a journalist. He acted as a collaborator for L’Ami des citoyens for a brief period before starting his own paper L'Orateur du Peuple, under the pseudonym Martel, which consisted of 8 pages and was distributed every other day, with Marcel Enfantin serving as editor. Aside from his writings in his paper, he openly collaborated with Marat and agreed to fund and write half of Desmoulins paper.

In June 1790, Marcel Enfantin was arrested for "provable conspiracy against liberty" because the authorities believed him to be Martel. In response, Fréron wrote:

Citizens, can you believe it? The Orateur du peuple is in chains! He had only taken up the pen in defense of your rights, he was a dynamic writer of the most ardent patriotism…he fought the ministerial hydra with a club, and the aristocracy with ridicule…Well, the Municipality has slandered [his] intentions…it has poisoned his innocent phrases…[but] the voice the Orateur du peuple will pierce the vaults of his prison…the articles of the Rights of Man were made to be used by this French citizen…so that he may publish his opinions.

Also, Fréron's relationship with Desmoulins brought him to the cause of the Cordeliers and prompted his involvement with the attack on Tuileries palace of 1792 (the insurrection of the Paris crowds against the House of Bourbon, and their battle with the Swiss Guards).

In September, Fréron was elected to the National Convention for the département of Seine, and voted in favor of Louis XVI's execution. Fréron served as a Représentant en mission to Provence, Marseille, and Toulon between 1793 and 1794 together with Paul Barras.

=== Siege of Toulon ===
He was charged with establishing the Convention's authority in the south during the Toulon rebellion. Fréron remained infamous as an enforcer of the Reign of Terror but came into contact with Napoleon Bonaparte, still just a young artillery officer, who had been stationed there. Augustin Robespierre and Antoine Christophe Saliceti, two representatives on mission, responded favourably to Napoleon's request (bypassing his commander, Jean François Carteaux) to seize the peninsula fort from the British and install artillery on a promontory overlooking the bay in order to fire on the British fleet at anchor. An infantry attack led by Bonaparte was repelled, due chiefly to Carteaux lowering the number of men allocated to Napoleon for the attack. Fréron, despite quarrelling with Bonaparte and threatening him with execution, eventually gave him his backing against Carteaux. He subsequently attempted to curtail Napoleon's career by insuring he would not command another larger attack on the British fort that was being planned, posting him to command the reserves instead. However, as this new attack faltered, Napoleon led the reserves forward without orders and seized the British fort.

Napoleon had previously introduced Fréron to his sister Pauline Bonaparte with whom he had a relationship until Pauline was married off to General Charles Leclerc in 1797.

== Reaction and the Directory ==
Nonetheless, both he and Barras joined the Thermidorian Reaction in its clash with Robespierre; L'Orateur du Peuple became the mouthpiece of anti-Jacobins, and Fréron incited the Muscadins to attack the sans-culottes with clubs. He brought about the accusation of Antoine Fouquier-Tinville, and of Jean-Baptiste Carrier, and the arrest of the last Montagnards. Being sent by the Directory on a mission of peace to Marseille he published in 1796 Mémoire historique sur la réaction royale et sur les malheurs du midi ("Historical Dissertation on the Royalist Reaction and the Misfortunes of the South").

He was elected to the Council of the Five Hundred, but not allowed to take his seat. Failing as suitor for the hand of Pauline Bonaparte, in 1801 he was sent by Napoleon, now first consul, to Saint Domingue and died there from yellow fever in 1802.

General Charles Leclerc, who had married Pauline Bonaparte, also received a command in Saint Domingue in 1801 (during the last stage of the Haitian Revolution), and died the same year.

== See also ==
- Jean Joseph Dussault
