= Crêtois =

Montagnard faction opposing the Thermidorian Reaction

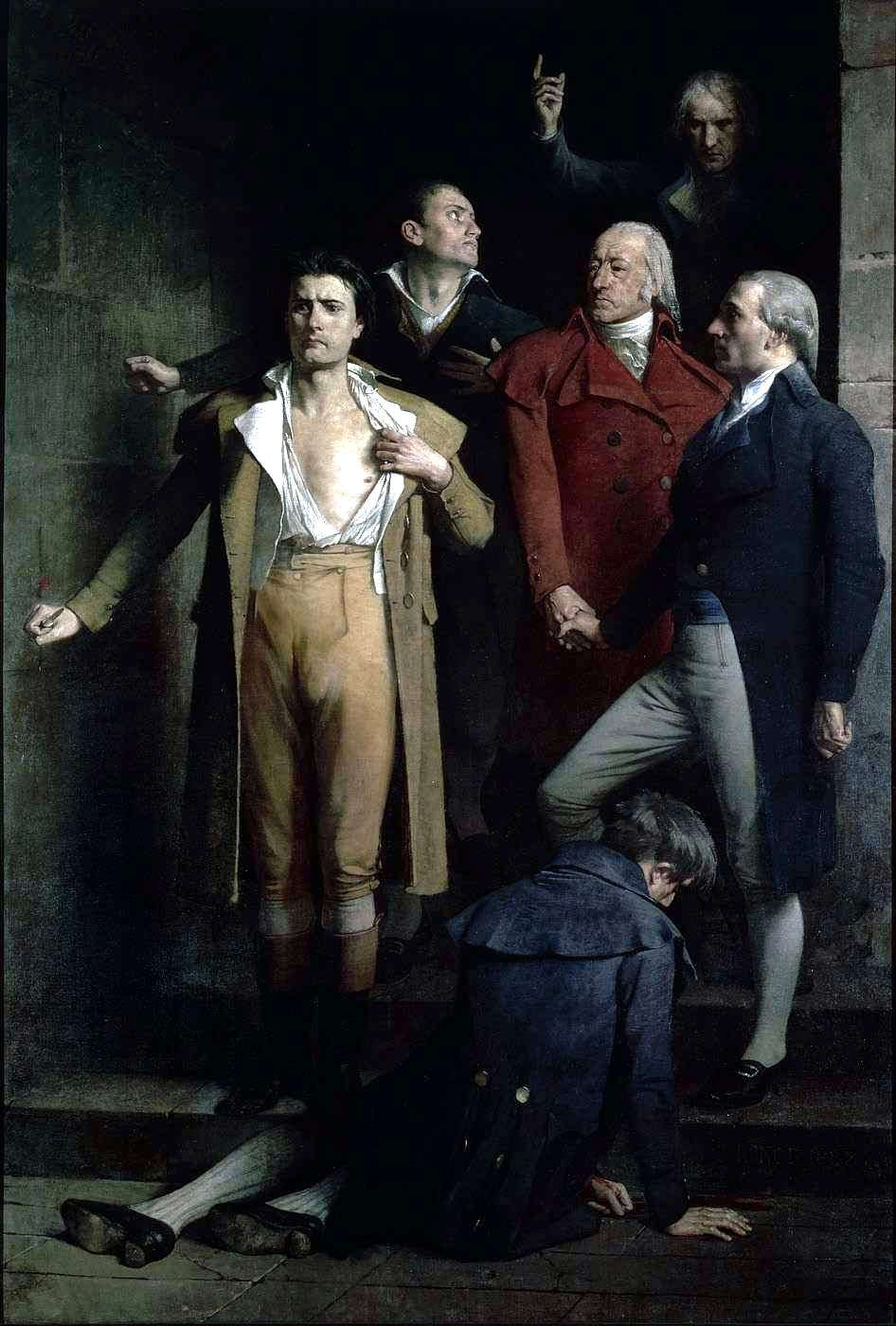
Charles Ronot, The Last Montagnards (Museum of the French Revolution).

The Crêtois was a nickname given to the remaining Montagnard deputies of the National Convention during Year III of the French First Republic (1794–1795). Dwindling in number, they attempted to oppose the Thermidorian Reaction during the French Revolution.

They participated in the insurrection of 12 Germinal Year III (1 April 1795) and the insurrection of 1 Prairial Year III (20 May 1795), attempting to regain power from The Plain and, more broadly, from the Thermidorians.

The Crêtois were expelled from the National Convention and faced harsh treatment, including executions and deportations. Some, such as Gilbert Romme, Ernest Dominique François Joseph Duquesnoy, and Jean-Marie Goujon, committed suicide.

== Origin of the term ==
The term "Crêtois" appeared in Year III, used pejoratively by Thermidorians and other Reactionaries. The expression "la Crête de la Montagne" ("the Crest of the Mountain") is also found, referring to the highest benches on which these deputies sat in the Salle des Machines of the Tuileries Palace, where the National Convention met at the time.

== The Deputies ==
Historians' estimates of the number of Crêtois have long ranged between 30 and 76. Based on the Memoirs of René Levasseur, Eugène Tarlé mentioned about thirty deputies. Albert Mathiez counted 60 deputies excluded from the Convention. François-Auguste Mignet referred to 76 deputies arrested or sentenced to death. Françoise Brunel estimates their number at around one hundred, based on the request for a roll-call vote made by Laurent Lecointre on 12 Germinal Year III (1 April 1795) (supported by 50 deputies), and the arrests that occurred in Germinal, Prairial, and Thermidor of Year III (April to July 1795). During this period, 74 Convention members were arrested, deported, or executed, including 25 who had signed Lecointre's request.

Dispersed after the Law of 22 Prairial, the Montagnards only reformed as a relatively cohesive group in the winter and spring of 1795. Most of them had been Thermidorians (excluding representatives on mission and alternates admitted to the Convention after the events of 9 Thermidor). They initially viewed the fall of Robespierre as a repetition of the days of 31 May – 2 June 1793, expecting the revolutionary government to be maintained until peace, followed by the implementation of the Constitution of Year I. During the offensive against popular societies in Vendémiaire, only a minority defended the Jacobin Club.

The turning point occurred in Frimaire with the indictment of Jean-Baptiste Carrier; 14 deputies opposed it. Others shifted their stance during the ensuing subsistence crisis and widespread popular misery. They began to denounce what they termed a "retreat" (French: recul) or a "step backward" (French: regard en arrière) from the principles of 1793. This perceived shift became known as the "reaction" (French: réaction) in the autumn of 1794 and early spring of 1795.

== Events of Germinal–Prairial Year III (April–May 1795) ==
During the insurrection of 12 Germinal Year III (1 April 1795), the crowd invaded the National Convention; only the Crêtois deputies remained in session. However, the hall was evacuated by troops, assisted by royalist sectionnaires, and twenty Crêtois were arrested. Barère, Vadier, Billaud-Varenne, and Collot d'Herbois were sentenced to deportation to Guiana.

During the Jacobin-led insurrection of 1 Prairial Year III (20 May 1795), the crowd again seized the Assembly. On this occasion, Convention member Féraud, who attempted to block their passage, was killed, and his head was paraded on a pike.

The Crêtois deputies present had Pierre-Amable de Soubrany elected commander of the Army of the Interior and established a commission. This commission decreed an amnesty for those deported after Germinal (who were already embarked at Île d'Oléron), the reinstatement of price controls (the Maximum), and other measures.

Soldiers under General Menou and Murat, summoned by Tallien, restored order. Twelve Crêtois deputies were arrested, including the session's secretary, Thirion de la Moselle.

Imprisoned at the Château du Taureau in Morlaix, Brittany, six of these deputies were condemned to death in Paris after an unjust trial. As they left the tribunal, they stabbed themselves with concealed daggers. Duquesnoy, Goujon, and Romme succeeded in killing themselves. Bourbotte, Duroy, and Soubrany, who only managed to wound themselves, were subsequently guillotined.

== See also ==
- Fall of Maximilien Robespierre
- First White Terror
- French Constitution of 1793
- Jacobin Club
- Paris Commune (1789–1795)
- Reign of Terror
- Sans-culottes

== Bibliography ==
- Brunel, Françoise (1977). "Les derniers montagnards et l'unité révolutionnaire". Annales historiques de la Révolution française (in French). 229: 385–404. doi:10.3406/ahrf.1977.1009.
