= Jean-Baptiste Le Carpentier =

French revolutionary politician (1759–1829)

Deputy to the National Convention
- In office 1792–1795
- Constituency: Manche

Personal details
- Born: 1 June 1759 Helleville, Normandy, France
- Died: 27 January 1829 (aged 69) Mont-Saint-Michel, France
- Party: The Mountain
- Occupation: Bailiff, lawyer, politician

Jean-Baptiste Le Carpentier (1 June 1759, Helleville – 27 January 1829, Mont-Saint-Michel) was a French revolutionary politician from Normandy. A Montagnard deputy to the National Convention for the Manche, he voted for the death of Louis XVI and served on missions in north-western France during the French Revolution. After the fall of Robespierre he was imprisoned, later amnestied, and following the Bourbon Restoration was exiled as a regicide; arrested on his clandestine return to France, he died in prison at Mont-Saint-Michel.

== Early life ==
Le Carpentier was the son of Marin Lecarpentier (1723–1796), a well-off farmer of the Cotentin and public officer at the town hall of Helleville, and the brother of Augustin-René Lecarpentier (1762–1846), parish priest of Flamanville. His parents sent him to the minor seminary at Valognes, and at the age of seventeen he entered a Valognes notary's office as a clerk.

== French Revolution ==
In 1789, having bought a business practice, Le Carpentier was a bailiff (huissier) at Valognes. An enthusiast for revolutionary ideas, he founded a popular society, the Amis de la Constitution (Friends of the Constitution). In 1790 he joined the town council and was appointed head of the local National Guard. In 1792 he was elected a member of the Council of the Manche and a deputy to the National Convention. He sat with the Montagnards, hostile to the Girondins, and at the Trial of Louis XVI he voted for the death of the king.

The Convention sent him on mission to press conscription in the departments of the Manche and the Orne. Charged with the defence of Granville against the Vendéan army, he urged the population to resist during the siege of Granville in November 1793, and he also organised the defence of Cherbourg and Saint-Lô.

== Fall and imprisonment ==
Sent on mission to Port-Malo (Saint-Malo), Le Carpentier learned of the fall of Robespierre on 13 Thermidor Year II (31 July 1794) and on the 17th sent the Convention a proclamation of partial rejoicing. He was recalled by order of the Committee of Public Safety on the 19th. Attacked as a Montagnard, he cited in his defence the resistance and organisation he had put in place at the siege of Granville. He was arrested after the insurrection of 1 Prairial Year III and imprisoned at the Château du Taureau together with Bourbotte, Duroy, Duquesnoy, Goujon, Romme and Soubrany. Le Carpentier escaped the fate of these men, who were executed and became known as the "Martyrs of Prairial" or the last Montagnards. He was then transferred to a prison in Brest. On the dissolution of the Convention he benefited from an amnesty voted by the assembly, and returned to Valognes, where he opened a legal consultancy.

== Exile, arrest and death ==
On the return of the Bourbons, Le Carpentier was exiled as a regicide in 1816. He took refuge on Guernsey but was turned back by the British authorities, and returned clandestinely to the Manche, hiding in the canton of Les Pieux. The prefect of the Manche, Charles-Achille de Vanssay, and the minister of police, Élie Decazes, put a price on his head and tried to bribe supposed accomplices of the former deputy; one peasant was sentenced to eighteen years' imprisonment for having sheltered him. After three years of searches he was arrested, with his son, at a peasant's house in the Cherbourg area in 1819. According to the prefecture, Le Carpentier had been giving lessons to young people of the surrounding countryside and had become a trusted figure among many peasants; it also reported seditious conduct, alleging that he had sought to alarm his credulous hosts about the intentions of the royal government regarding the sale of national lands, the restoration of the tithe and feudal dues.

Sentenced to life imprisonment, he died in the prison of Mont-Saint-Michel. He was buried civilly; his body was interred in the cemetery of Ardevon, while his skull was reportedly removed to be studied according to the phrenological system of Franz Joseph Gall and kept at an unknown location at Mont-Saint-Michel.

== Sources ==
- Gautier, René, ed. (2014). 601 communes et lieux de vie de la Manche : le dictionnaire incontournable de notre patrimoine. Inédits & Introuvables (in French). Bayeux: Éditions Eurocibles. p. 247. ISBN 978-2-35458-036-0.
- Histoire et dictionnaire de la Révolution française 1789-1799 by Jean Tulard, Jean-François Fayard and Alfred Fierro.
- La Terreur à Port-Malo by Étienne Maignen, Bulletin et mémoires de la Société archéologique et historique d'Ille-et-Vilaine, vol. 108, 2004.
- La poignée de main du bourreau by G. Lenotre, chapter XIV ("Un paria").
- Jean Baptiste Lecarpentier, représentant du peuple by Jean-Louis Ménard, Éditions des Champs, 2001.
