= Philippe Rühl =

French politician (1737–1795)

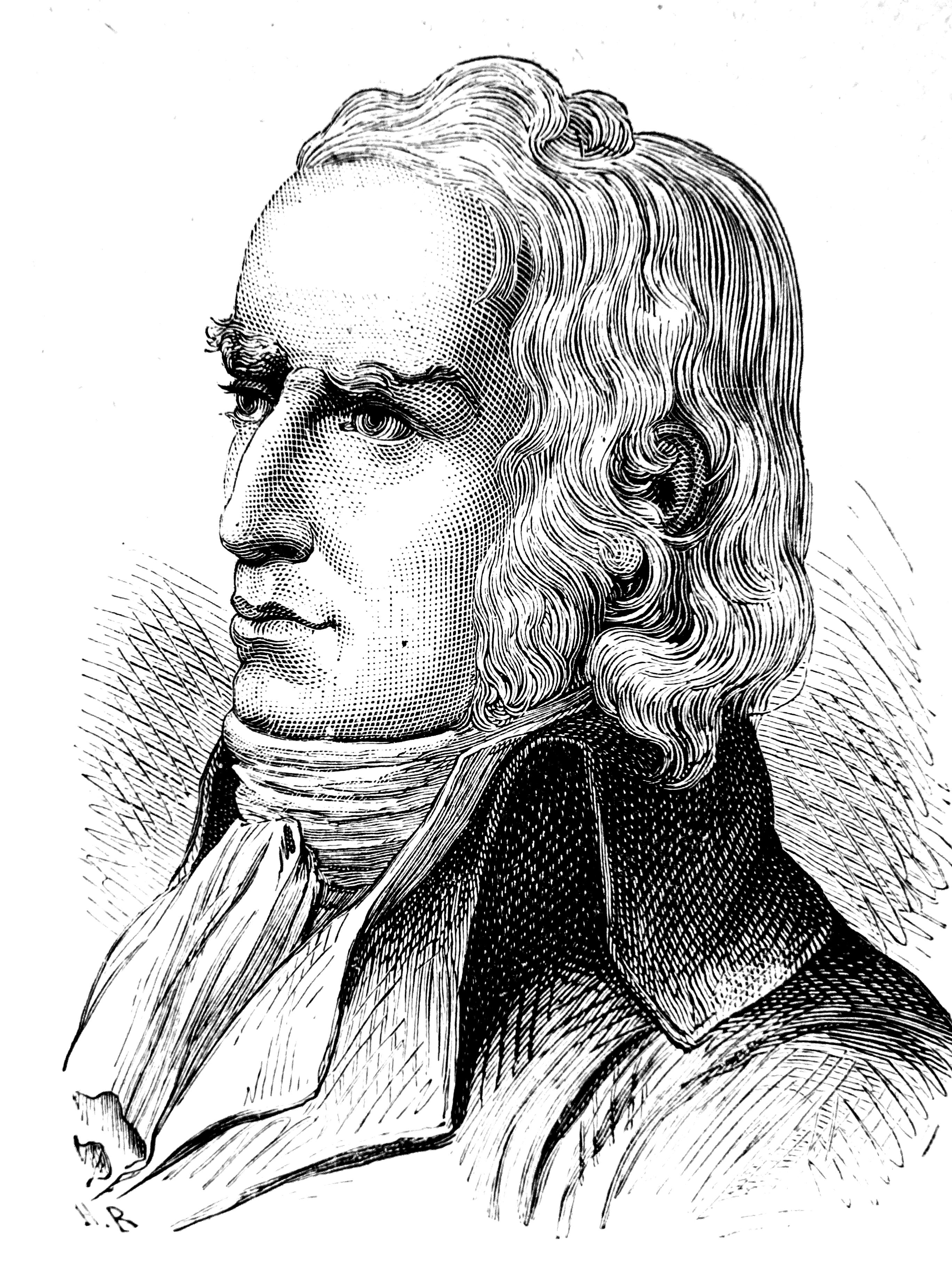

38th President of the National Convention
- In office 6 March 1794 – 21 March 1794
- Preceded by: Louis Antoine de Saint-Just
- Succeeded by: Jean-Lambert Tallien
- In office 20 September 1792 (provisional)
- Preceded by: Office established
- Succeeded by: Jérôme Pétion de Villeneuve

Member of the National Convention
- In office 21 September 1792 – 26 October 1795
- Constituency: Bas-Rhin

Personal details
- Born: 3 May 1737 Strasbourg, Kingdom of France
- Died: 29 May 1795 (aged 58) Strasbourg, French First Republic
- Cause of death: Suicide
- Party: The Mountain
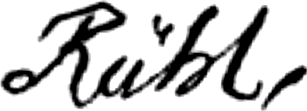
- Signature

Philippe Jacques Rühl (3 May 1737 – 29/30 May 1795) was a statesman during the French Revolution, best remembered as the doyen d'âge (oldest deputy) of the opening session of the Convention of 1792–1795.

== Biography ==
Born in Strasbourg, France, a son of a Lutheran minister. He studied theology at the University of Strasbourg. He later served as director of gymnasium at Dürkheim, then as a tutor at the princely court of Leiningen-Dachsburg (Linange-Hartenbourg). As court counselor, he participated in settling succession dispute with the Italian branch of the family.

== French Revolution ==
With the advent of French Revolution, he returned to his native Alsace, where he became an administrator of the Département of Bas-Rhin under the new regime created by the National Assembly.

He was elected (31 August 1791) as a representative of Bas-Rhin to the Legislative Assembly (1791–1792). He sat with the extreme left wing of the deputies and served as a deputy member of the Extraordinary Commission of Twelve (18 June 1792 – 21 September 1792).

Elected (4 September 1792) to the Convention (1792–1795) as a deputy for Bas-Rhin, he presided at the first session of the convention as the oldest deputy present (20 September 1792). He continued to ally himself with the more radical section of deputies, joining the Montagnard faction. However, he was absent from the convention during the trial of King Louis XVI. He would go on to serve a full term as President of the Convention from 6 March 1794 until 21 March 1794.

Rühl served as a member of the Committee of General Security (14 September 1793 – 31 August 1794). He was dispatched as Representative on a Mission to departments of Marne and Haute-Marne (16 September 1793 – 3 November 1793) to assist in arranging the levée en masse (military conscription). While on this mission he showed his revolutionary zeal by breaking the so-called Holy Ampulla (8 October 1793) – the Holy Ampulla had been a vessel containing the sacred oil for anointment of the French kings at Reims. He served in a second mission to Bas-Rhin (23 Nov 1793 – 8 Jan 1794) for organizing the district of Neu-Saarwerden.

Along with Robert Lindet of the Committee of Public Safety, he refused to sign the death warrant of Georges Danton in the spring of 1794.

== Thermidor ==
Rühl was designated for yet another mission, this time to Bas-Rhin and Haut-Rhin, 24 July 1794, but did not depart until 1 August 1794, and so he was in Paris to witness the fall of Robespierre. He returned 25 August 1794.

He participated in the Revolt of 1 Prairial Year III (20 May 1795), addressing the insurgents with the words "Du pain et la Constitution de 1793!" ("Bread and Constitution of 1793!"). This action threatened the new conservative order, and he was threatened with indictment, but in the end was sentenced only to house arrest "in view of his advanced age" (he was 58). He was called before the military commission on 28 May 1795 and committed suicide by stabbing himself with a dagger, a precursor of the "Martyrs of Prairial" (Bourbotte, Duroy, Duquesnoy, Goujon, Romme, and Soubrany).

== External sources ==
- Biography of Rühl, Philippe
