= Pierre-Amable de Soubrany =

French revolutionary (1752–1795)

Member of the National Convention
- Constituency: Puy-de-Dôme

Personal details
- Born: 17 September 1752 Riom, Puy-de-Dôme, Kingdom of France
- Died: 17 June 1795 (aged 42)
- Cause of death: Suicide on the way to be guillotined
- Party: The Mountain

Pierre-Amable de Soubrany (17 September 1752 – 17 June 1795) was a French soldier, left-wing politician, and former nobleman who was devoted to the French Revolution. He was elected to the National Convention for Puy-de-Dôme and voted for the execution of the former king, Citizen Louis Capet. He also served the French First Republic as a représentant en mission. After the fall of Maximilien Robespierre in 1794, Soubrany was one of the last remaining Montagnards.

In 1795, Soubrany was accused of instigating the Revolt of 1 Prairial Year III, along with five other Montagnard deputies. They were all arrested, convicted, and sentenced to death. While being led away from the courtroom, they tried to commit suicide using a concealed knife, passing it between one another. Although Soubrany survived the attempt, he died on the way to the guillotine, and his corpse was beheaded.

== Early life ==
Pierre-Amable de Soubrany was born on 17 September 1752 at the Maison des Consuls hotel in Riom to a minor noble family from lower Auvergne. His father was Pierre-Amable Soubrany of Verrières, who served as President-Treasurer of France, and his mother was Marguerite de Boys de Macholle. Although Soubrany took his father's given names, he was nicknamed "Auguste". Starting in 1767, he attended the College of Juilly.

In 1774, when he was 22 years old, Soubrany joined the Royal 3rd Dragoon Regiment at the rank of "sous-lieutenant surnuméraire" (transl. supernumerary second lieutenant). The hierarchy of the regiment was dictated by "aristocratic prejudice", wherein "presented" nobility were given the highest ranks, lower nobility like Soubrany were limited in ranks they could attain, and enlisted commoners received the worst posts with few opportunities for promotion. Ultimately, Soubrany left the army because he hated this system of favoritism.

== Political career ==
Soubrany resigned from the military and returned to Riom in May 1789 as the French Revolution was gaining momentum. He kept up with the sessions of the Estates General and supported the "parti avancé" (transl. progressive faction). During this time, he became the first commander of the National Guard of Riom. Later that year, after the National Constituent Assembly was established, some citizens (Note: Certain heads of households over 21 years-old.) were given the right to vote in new municipal elections. On 1 February 1790, Soubrany was elected to be the first mayor of Riom, defeating his right-wing opponent.

In September 1791, Soubrany was elected deputy to the National Legislative Assembly for the department of Puy-de-Dôme. The following month, he was admitted to the Jacobin Club, but Maximilien Robespierre later expelled him from the club for being a "ci-devant", or a former nobleman.

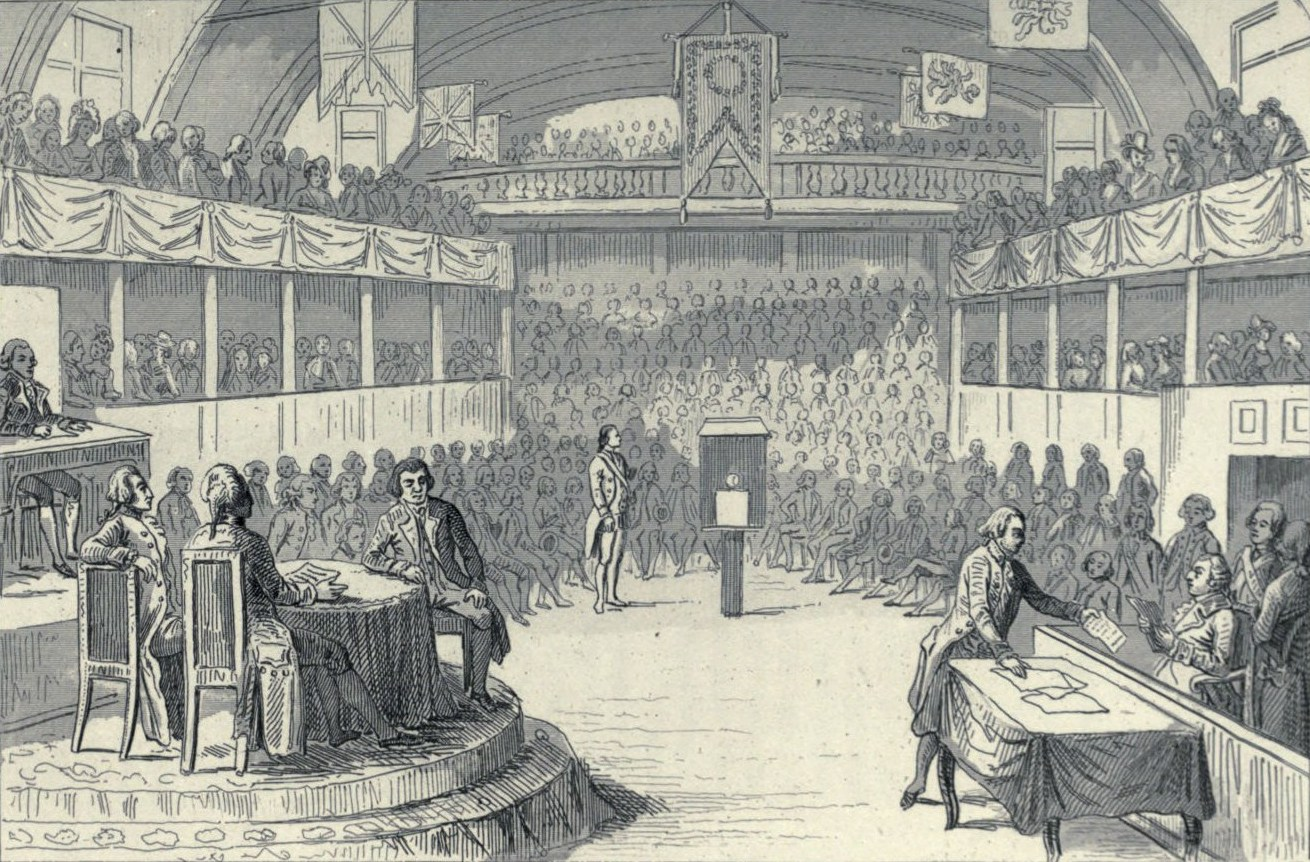
Citizen Louis Capet being cross-examined at his trial at the National Convention

In September 1792, Soubrany was elected to the National Convention for Puy-de-Dôme and sat with the Montagnards. He formed a close friendship with fellow deputy from Puy-de-Dôme, Gilbert Romme. During the trial of Louis XVI, he voted for the death of Citizen Louis Capet and against l'appel au people (transl. the people's appeal) for a stay of execution.

Soubrany was dispatched as a représentant en mission to support armies in the field, first to the Army of the Moselle and then to the Army of the Eastern Pyrenees.

After the events of 9 Thermidor Year II (27 July 1794), Robespierre and many of his closest allies were executed, and the Thermidorian Reaction began, with many former Jacobins shifting to conservative positions. Soubrany was on a mission at the time, and he welcomed the news of Robespierre's downfall. However, even though he was an anti-Robespierrist, he came to despise the "last-minute" Thermidorians, whom he criticized for their political opportunism. In a letter written on 27 Nivôse Year III (16 January 1795), Soubrany said that the "faction [of] Tallien, Fréron, Rovère, Bentabole, etc., etc." contained "de plus scélèrat dans la Convention" (transl. the most villainous [elements] of the Convention). He also wrote that he and other Montagnards were being slandered as "terroristes" and "buveurs de sang" (transl. blood-drinkers). Thermidorians also ridiculed the remaining Montagnards in the National Convention with the pejorative nickname "the Crêtois".

== Downfall and suicide ==
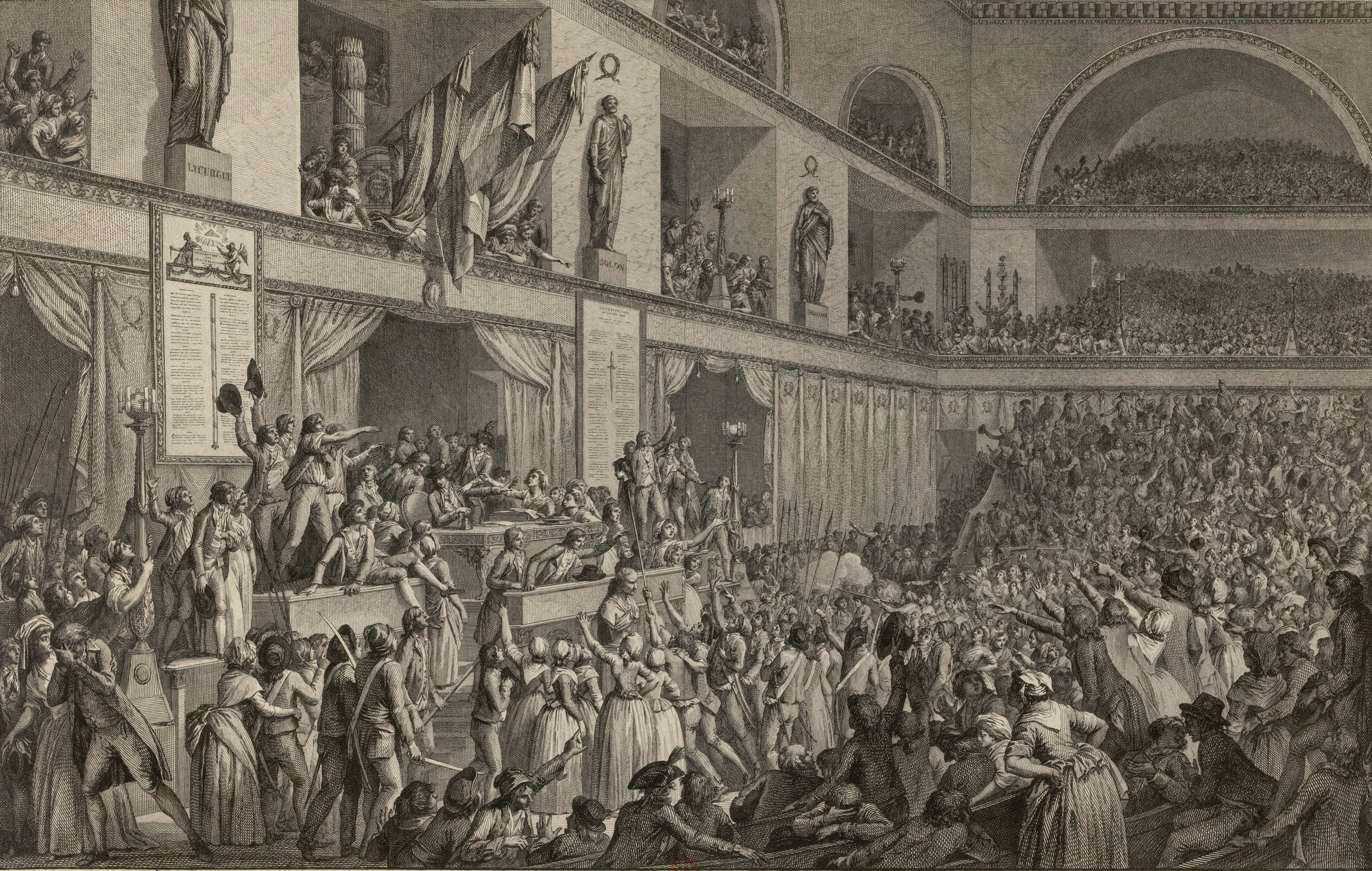
Revolt of 1 Prairial Year III

During the revolt of 1 Prairial Year III on 20 May 1795, the sans-culottes stormed the National Convention in the Tuileries Palace, demanding that the Convention adopt the Constitution of 1793 and reduce the price of bread. Soubrany was accused of instigating the revolt after a citizen nominated him to be "General of the Parisian Army".

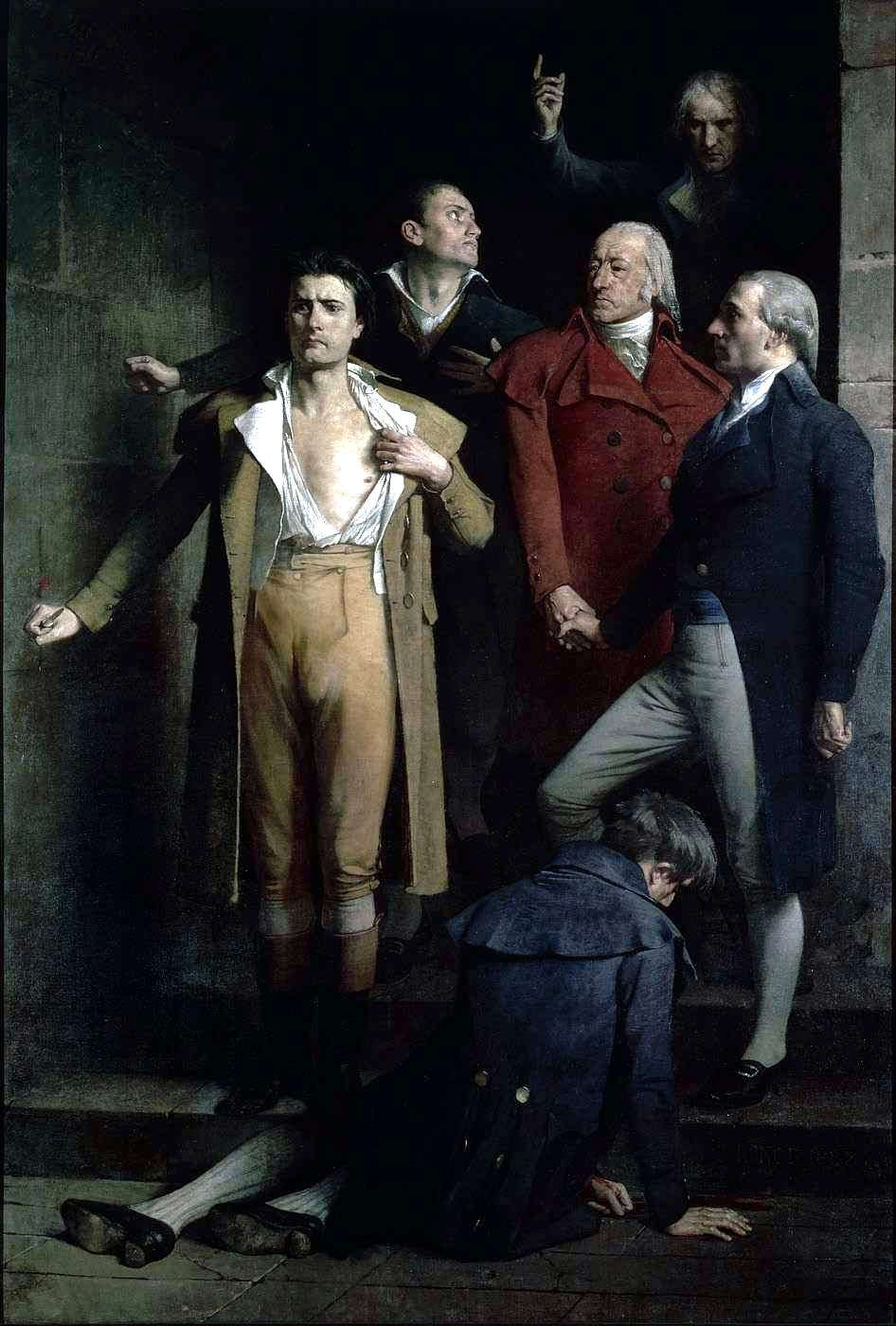
Les Derniers Montagnards (1882) by Charles Ronot, which depicts the suicide of the six deputies (Note: Jean-Marie Claude Alexandre Goujon is depicted holding knife in left foreground, and Gilbert Romme is on the ground. Experts disagree about which figure in Charles Ronot's painting represents Soubrany.)

Soubrany was arrested alongside fellow Montagnard deputies Bourbotte, Duroy, Duquesnoy, Goujon, and Romme. Although there was no evidence that Soubrany or any of the others instigated the revolt, they were still convicted and sentenced to death. The six deputies made a suicide pact and, on the staircase outside of the courtroom, they tried to kill themselves with a knife that Goujon had hidden. Three of them succeeded, but Soubrany was only able to wound himself at that time.

A medical officer found that Soubrany was still gasping for air, so he was taken with Duroy and Bourbotte to the guillotine by cart. Soubrany stopped breathing by the time they arrived, but his body was still beheaded. In his book Les Derniers Montagnards, Jules Claretie wrote that "Sanson guillotina encore une fois un cadavre" (transl. "Sanson once again guillotined a cadaver").

== Legacy ==
The Prairial revolt and the deaths of Soubrany, Bourbotte, Duroy, Duquesnoy, Goujon, and Romme marked the end of the Mountain as a political party. In 1882, Charles Ronot depicted Soubrany and the other five deputies committing suicide in a painting entitled Les Derniers Montagnards, or The Last of the Montagnards.

== See also ==
- Reign of Terror
- Insurrection of 12 Germinal Year III
