= François Louis Bourdon =

French politician (1758–1798)

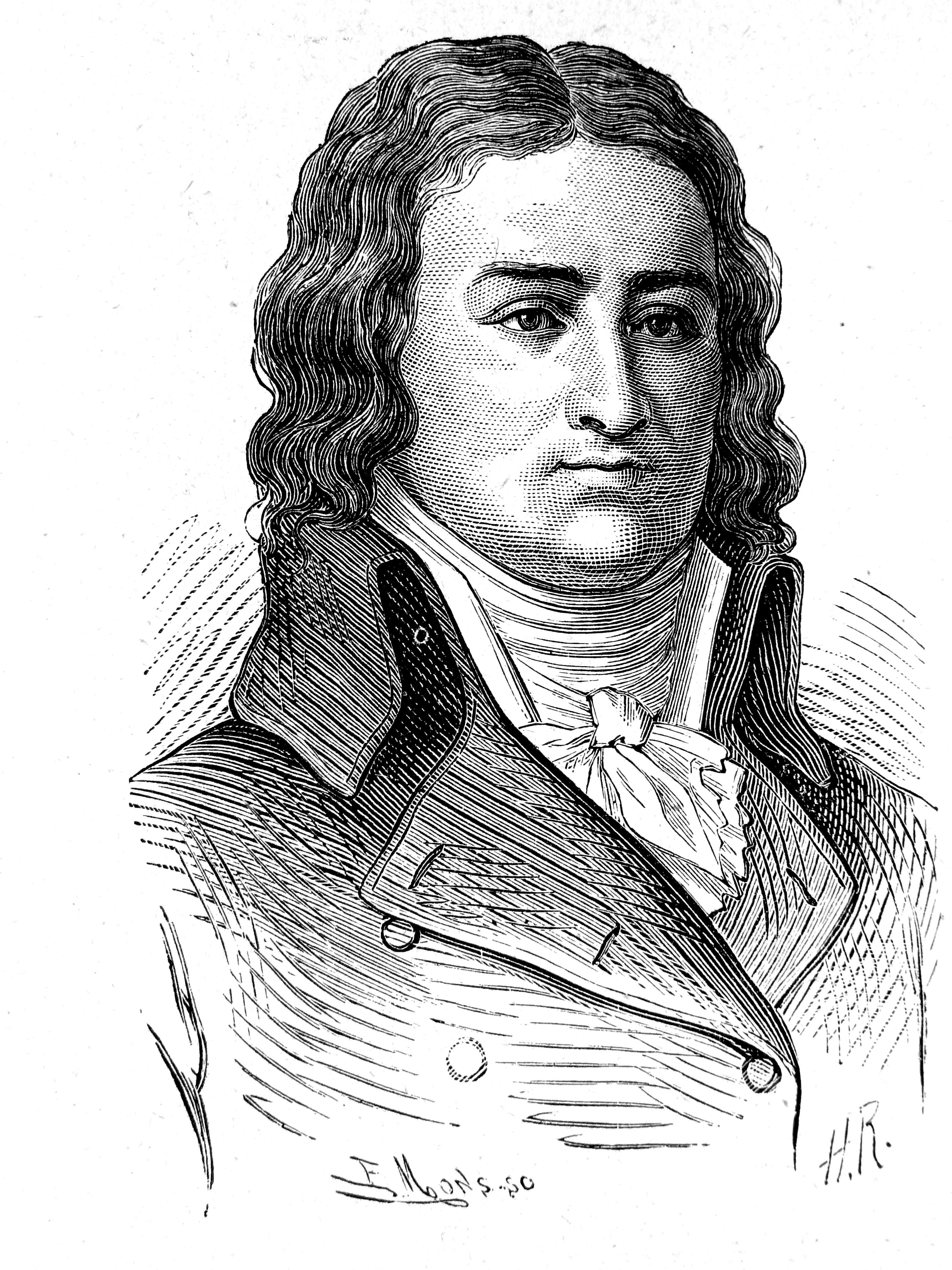
François Louis Bourdon

François Louis Bourdon (11 January 1758 – 22 June 1798), also known as Bourdon de l'Oise, was a French politician of the Revolutionary period and procureur at the parlement of Paris.

== Biography ==
Born in Rouy-le-Petit (Somme), he was from early on an advocate of revolutionary doctrines, and took an active part in the insurrection of 10 August 1792. Representing the département of the Oise in the National Convention, he voted for the immediate execution of King Louis XVI.

He accused the Girondists of relations with the Bourbons, then turned against Maximilien Robespierre, who had him expelled from the Jacobin Club for his conduct as commissioner of the Convention with the French Revolutionary Army troops in La Rochelle.

On 27 July 1794, at the onset of the Thermidorian Reaction, he was one of the deputies delegated to aid Paul Barras to repress the insurrection of the Paris Commune in favour of Robespierre. Bourdon then became a violent reactionary, attacking the former members of The Mountain and supporting rigorous measures against the rioters of the 12 Germinal Year III, and that of 1 Prairial Year III.

In the Council of Five Hundred under the French Directory, Bourdon belonged to the party of Clichyens, composed of crypto-Royalists, against whom the directors used the Coup of 18 Fructidor. Bourdon was arrested and deported to French Guiana, and died soon after his arrival in Sinnamary.
