= Revolt of 1 Prairial Year III =

Parisian revolt against the Thermidorian Convention

Revolt of 1 Prairial, Year III
- Part of the French Revolution
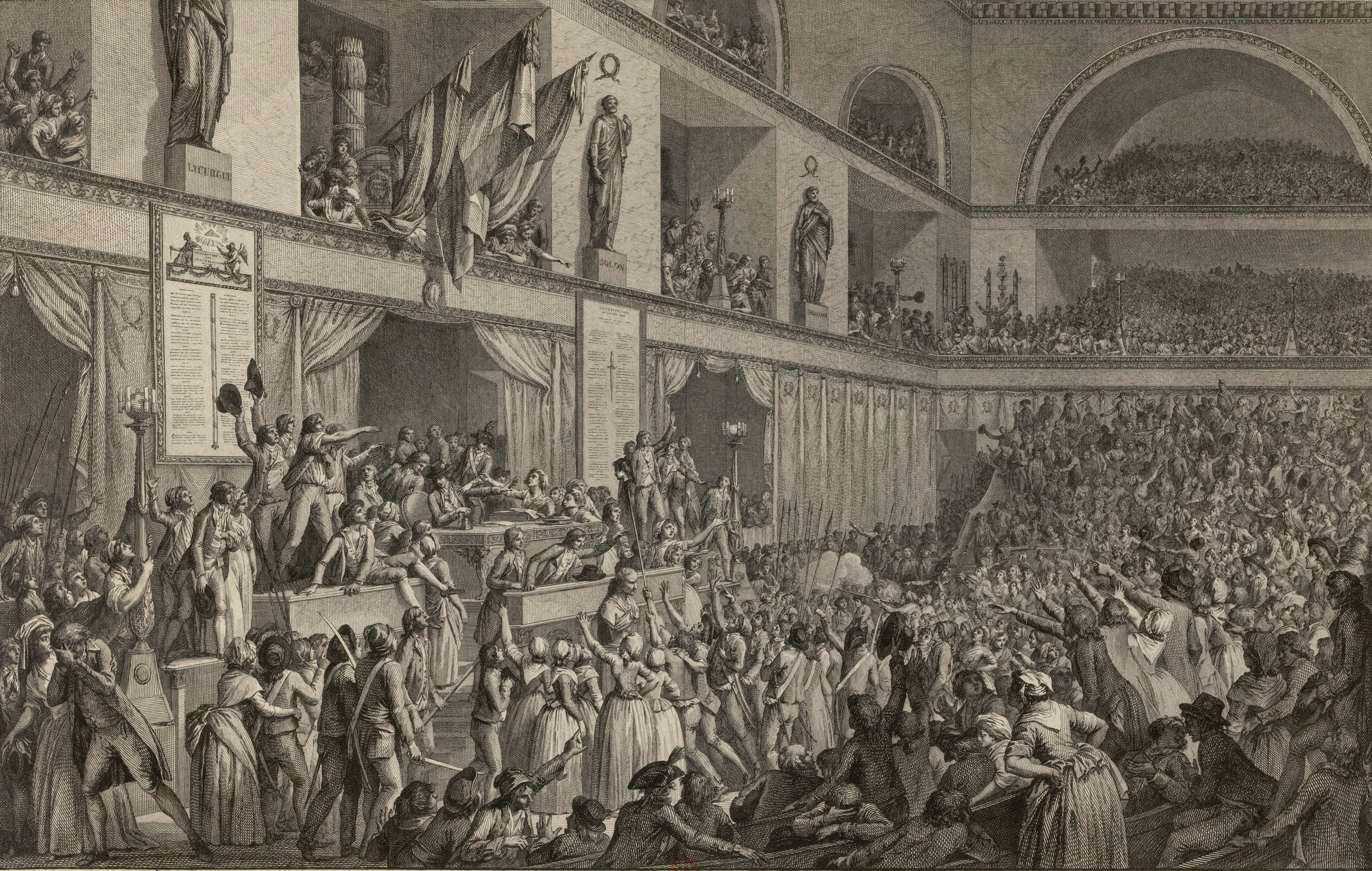
- Journée du 1^{er} prairial an III, engraving by Isidore-S. Helman after Charles Monnet (1796)
Date	1–4 Prairial Year III (20–23 May 1795)
Location	Paris, France
Result	Thermidorian victory: Suppression of the sans-culotte movement; Disarming of the militant sections; Arrest, trial, and execution or suicide of the "Last Montagnards"

Belligerents
Thermidorian Convention; Supported by: National Guard; Regular army detachments	Sans-culottes of the Faubourg Saint-Antoine and Saint-Marcel; Supported by: Popular societies; Remaining Montagnard deputies

Commanders and leaders
François-Antoine de Boissy d'Anglas (political); Gen. Jacques de Menou (military)	Popular sectional leaders; Romme; Goujon

Strength
Unknown	Several thousand insurgents

Casualties and losses
Jean-Bertrand Féraud	Dozens executed or imprisoned: 6 Convention deputies sentenced to death; 3 deputies (Romme, Goujon, Duquesnoy) committed suicide; 3 deputies guillotined (Bourbotte, Duroy, Soubrany); Thousands arrested and purged from local institutions

The Revolt of 1 Prairial Year III (20 May 1795) was the final major popular uprising of the French Revolution. Sans-culottes from eastern Paris marched on the National Convention demanding "du pain et la Constitution de l'An I"—bread and enforcement of the radical Constitution of Year I. They briefly occupied the hall, murdered deputy Jean-Bertrand Féraud, and called for renewed price controls and direct democracy. Loyal National Guard units cleared the Convention by nightfall. A second mobilization on 2 Prairial collapsed, and by 4 Prairial the faubourgs were disarmed. Fourteen deputies were ordered arrested; eight were seized. Six deputies were condemned to death. Romme, Goujon, and Duquesnoy committed suicide, while the others were guillotined. The defeat of the uprising marked the end of sans-culotte political influence and consolidated the Thermidorian Reaction.

== Background ==
Following the Coup of 9 Thermidor (27 July 1794), the Thermidorians dismantled the institutions of the Reign of Terror, repealed the General Maximum on prices, and reopened free commerce. The winter of 1794–95 was severe, with the Seine frozen for forty-five days, and food shortages and inflation worsened. A peaceful demonstration on 12 Germinal Year III (1 April 1795) failed to change policy. By mid-May, the Paris bread ration had fallen below 60 g per day.

== Uprising ==
=== 1 Prairial (20 May) ===
Armed crowds from the faubourgs Saint-Antoine and Saint-Marcel, accompanied by artillery, entered the Tuileries. Deputy Féraud was shot while attempting to block their entry; his head was placed on a pike and presented to Convention president Boissy d'Anglas, who saluted it impassively. Montagnard deputies demanded the immediate enforcement of the Constitution and restoration of price controls, but the insurgents lacked coordination and withdrew at dusk as loyal forces arrived.

=== 2–3 Prairial ===
The Convention declared Paris in a state of siege and authorized General Menou to restore order. Skirmishes occurred around the Halle aux Blés and Hôtel de Ville, but most sections remained neutral or loyal to the Convention. National Guard units from the western arrondissements joined with army detachments, gradually isolating the insurgents in the eastern faubourgs. By the evening of 3 Prairial, the uprising had lost momentum.

=== 4 Prairial (23 May) ===
Menou's columns occupied the eastern districts without resistance, seized artillery, and arrested hundreds of militants. The Convention ordered the arrest of fourteen deputies who had supported the revolt; eight were apprehended.

== Repression and trials ==
A military commission sentenced six deputies—Romme, Goujon, Duquesnoy, Bourbotte, Duroy, and Pierre-Amable de Soubrany—to death. Romme, Goujon, and Duquesnoy took their own lives en route to the scaffold. The others were guillotined on 29 Prairial. The repression extended further: dozens were tried, imprisoned, or executed. Thousands of suspected militants were arrested, and sans-culottes were purged from the National Guard and sectional assemblies. Philippe Rühl committed suicide in May 1795 when called before the military commission.

== Aftermath ==
Prairial's defeat ended the sans-culottes as a political and military force. Sectional assemblies were dissolved, militants disarmed, and the city placed under military oversight. The Constitution of the Year III (22 August 1795) reintroduced property qualifications for voting, excluding much of the working class. The uprising's suppression relied heavily on regular troops rather than citizen guards, setting a precedent for military involvement in civil politics. This reliance would characterize the Directory and foreshadow Napoleon's rise.

== In art ==
Nineteenth-century painters often depicted Boissy d'Anglas saluting Féraud's severed head, notably Félix Auvray, Joseph-Désiré Court, Eugène Delacroix, and Auguste Vinchon. Charles Ronot's Les Derniers Montagnards (1882) portrays the suicides of the condemned deputies.

== See also ==
- Crêtois
- Sans-culottes
- Thermidorian Reaction
- Reign of Terror
- Germinal uprising
