= Claude-Alexandre Ysabeau =

French priest (1754–1831)

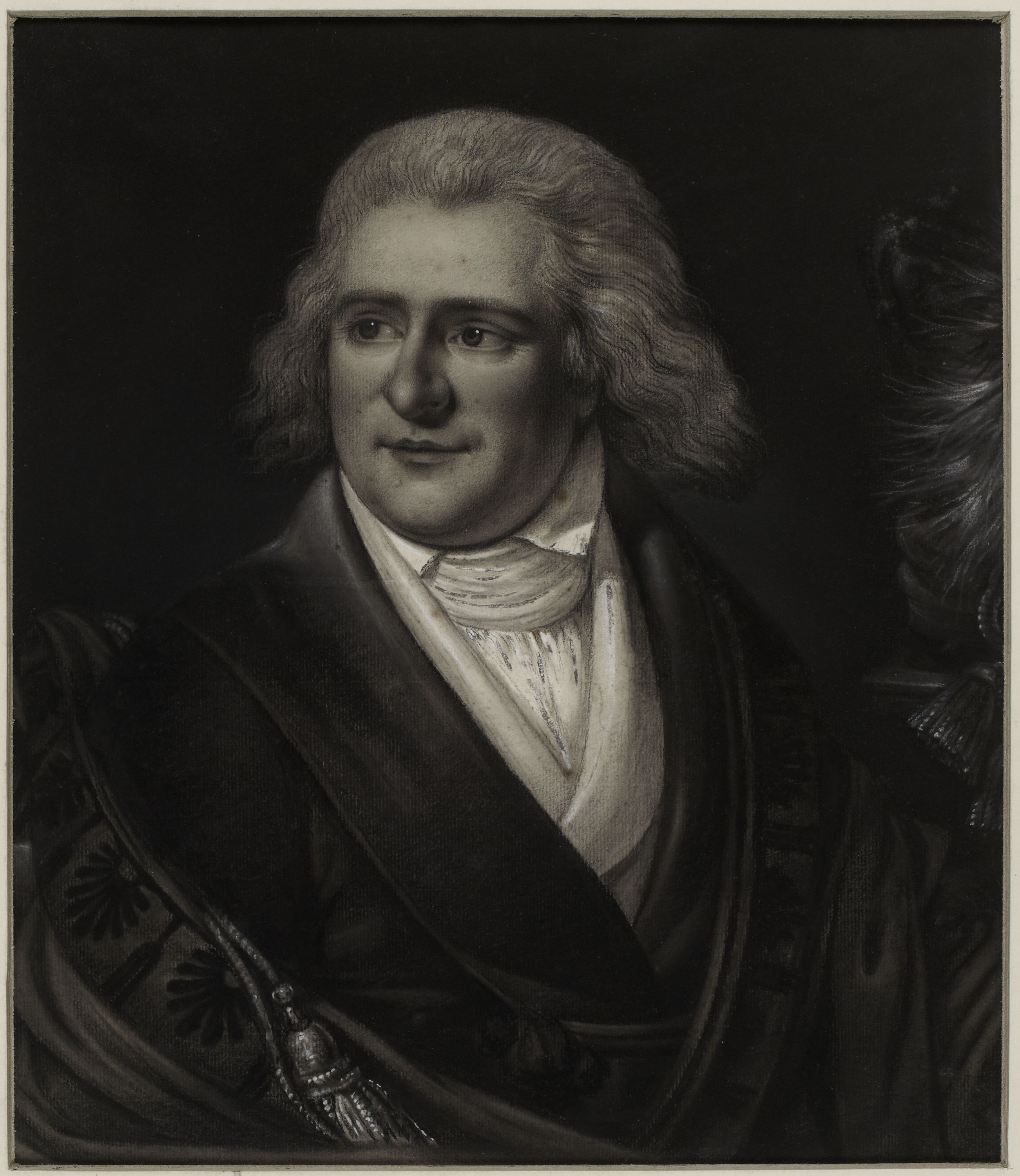
Undated portrait de Claude-Alexandre Ysabeau

Claude-Alexandre Ysabeau was born in Gien on 14 July 1754 and died in Paris on 18 March 1831.

He was first an Oratorian priest and later a constitutional priest in St-Martin-de-Tours, eventually serving as Vicar-General to the Bishop of Tours in 1791. He was a teacher at the École Militaire de Vendôme and at the Collège de Tours.

He was elected as a deputy to the National Convention for the departement of Indre-et-Loire. He voted for the death of Louis XVI.

The Convention sent him to Pyrénées-Orientales to organise the army there. Then, together with Jean-Lambert Tallien, he was sent by the Convention as a Commissioner to Bordeaux in August 1793 to restore order following an attempted revolt. Robespierre urged them to 'punish the traitors and royalists promptly and severely'. However, by the end of 1793 Ysabeau and Tallien had only executed 104 Federalist leaders. Along with Tallien, Ysabeau was later denounced by Robespierre for moderation, and returned to Paris to clear his name. Together with Tallien, Ysabeau was one of the Convention members who instigated the Thermidorean Reaction which overthrew Robespierre.

In March 1795 he became a member of the Committee of General Security and in October of the same year he was elected to the Council of Ancients. Under the Consulate and Empire he served as an inspector of the post.

He is buried in the Père-Lachaise cemetery (37th division).
