= Jean-Marie Claude Alexandre Goujon =

French Revolution politician (1766–1795)

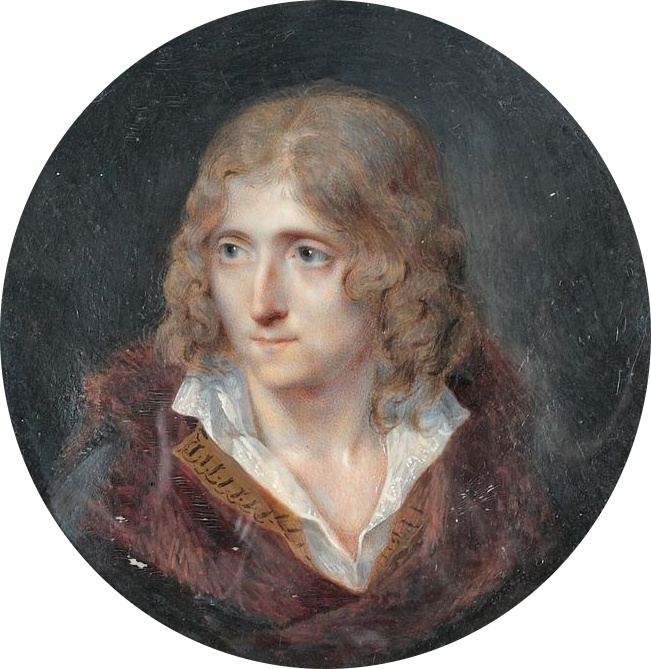
- Portrait of Jean-Marie Claude Alexandre Goujon, miniature by Jean-Baptiste Isabey

Member of the National Convention
- In office 17 September 1792 – 17 June 1795
- Constituency: Seine-et-Oise

Personal details
- Born: 13 April 1766 Bourg-en-Bresse, Kingdom of France
- Died: 17 July 1795 (aged 29) Paris, France
- Cause of death: Suicide
- Party: The Mountain

Jean Marie Claude Alexandre Goujon (13 April 1766, Bourg-en-Bresse – 17 June 1795, Paris) was a politician of the French Revolution. He was a member of the National Convention from 1793 to 1795, was sentenced to death after the Revolt of 1 Prairial Year III and committed suicide before he could be executed.

== Early life ==
His grandfather, Claude Goujon, was director of a tax farm (les droits réunis) in Dijon, and his father, Claude Alexandre Goujon, was a tax farmer from Bourg-en-Bresse. On 9 February 1762, Claude Alexandre married Joan Margaret Nicole Ricard, daughter of Joseph Ricard, a barrister, and First Secretary of the Stewardship of Burgundy (born 1745). In 1774 the family moved to Provins.

The young Jean-Marie Goujon abandoned his studies after his father encountered financial difficulties, going first to Dieppe and then Saint-Malo to join the Navy. Having enlisted at the age of twelve as a seaman aboard the Diadême, he was on board the Saint-Esprit at the Battle of Ushant (1778) against the English fleet. The next day he wrote his father a letter that was read aloud in the garden of the Palais Royal as a victory bulletin.

After two years working for a merchant in Saint-Malo, he secured a job as sub-inspector of artillery crews in Morlaix, before being employed in the offices of the navy first at Brest, then in Saint-Malo. In 1783, seventeen years old, he moved to Mauritius, where his uncle Ricard, future mayor of Port-Louis, had a trading house. He came back to France the following year. In 1786, he became an attorney's clerk in Paris, where he befriended another young clerk, Pierre-François Tissot. In May 1790 he joined his parents in Rennes, where his father was director of the postal service, and entered the offices of the Intendant of Brittany. In 1790, he settled at Meudon, near Paris, and resumed his education.

== During the revolution ==
Goujon took part in the early days of the revolution, helping to seize weapons after the dismissal of Necker and becoming a member of the council of the Légion du Châtelet. At the end of 1789, he acquired some academic recognition for his discourse offered as an entry for a prize from the Academy of Dijon, "On the Influence of the Morals of Governments on those of the People", which was influenced by Rousseau and Mably. The prize was not awarded, by the Academy declared that only Goujon's entry had been of genuine interest to them.

In 1791, he first came to the attention of the general public following his response to the letter of Raynal, in which the Encyclopedist violently attacked the work of the Constituent Assembly. Later that year, he was living at Meudon and was invited to deliver the funeral address for Mirabeau at Versailles. He also became a member of the Society of the Friends of the Constitution (known as the Jacobins) of Sèvres. In 1792 he was elected first as administrator, then, the day after the storming of the Tuilleries, as Attorney-General of the Department of Seine-et-Oise.

== Convention ==
On 17 September 1792 Goujon became the sixth alternate deputy to the National Convention for Seine-et-Oise, winning 410 out of 657 votes.

Engaged in the fight against high prices in autumn 1792, in November he wrote and presented to the Convention an address demanding the taxation of grain prices. In this he showed that the government's liberal economic policy had important social consequences: "The unlimited freedom of the grain trade is incompatible with the existence of our Republic. And indeed, what constitutes a Republic? A small number of capitalists and a large number of poor... This class of capitalists and landlords, the unlimited freedom that makes mistress of grain prices, is also mistress of the establishment of the working day." He concluded by calling for land reform, with a maximum farm size of 120 acres (0.49 km^{2}), and the central management of essential supplies, with its members elected by the people. He also argued in favour of a law establishing the general maximum, thus introducing price controls. At the time the Convention was dominated by the Gironde, so his proposal was rejected. Only when the Jacobins took power was a Commission on Subsistence and Provisions set up, in October 1793. On 5 Brumaire Year II (26 October 1793) Goujon became one of its three commissioners, and played a major role in this post in establishing the fixed prices that were to be enforced under the general maximum. Having completed this work, Goujon resigned from the Commission on 2 Ventôse (20 February 1794).

Soon after, he was assigned to a diplomatic mission to Istanbul, but never actually went on it. From 5–8 April 1794 he served as interim Foreign Minister and Interior Minister, and on 26 Germinal (15 April) after Hérault de Séchelles was guillotined, Goujon took his seat as a member of the Convention.

On 12 Floréal (1 May) he was appointed by the Committee of Public Safety to be Représentant en mission to the Var, Bouches-du-Rhône and Alpes-Maritimes, but appears not to have actually gone there either. Instead, on 17 Prairial (15 June) he was appointed Représentant en mission to the Armies of the Rhine and the Moselle. He did take up this post, accompanied by Tissot as his secretary, and together with Nicolas Hentz and Pierre Bourbotte, took part in the campaign which conquered the Palatinate.

Goujon was in Thionville when news reached him of the fall of Robespierre in the Thermidorian Reaction. He wrote to the Convention on 13 Thermidor to congratulate it on its victory, and his letter was read aloud from the tribune. He was recalled by order of the Committee of Public Safety on 23 Thermidor (10 August). Reaching Paris on 10 Fructidor (27 August), he soon found himself increasingly at odds with those now in power.

On 12 Fructidor (29 August) he defended the seven members of the former committees who had been attacked by Laurent Lecointre. On 20 Pluviôse Year III (8 February 1795) he responded to the arrest of Gracchus Babeuf and the closure of political clubs by proposing a decree against those who attacked the rights of man and the constitution. On 18 Ventôse (8 March) he was the only deputy with sufficient courage to vote against the readmission to the Convention of Jean-Baptiste Louvet de Couvrai and other survivors of the Girondin party, who he felt would be too much inclined to avenge old wrongs.

On 21 Ventôse (11 March) he complained that people who had previously been described as patriots were now being subjected to the vague designation of "terrorists", and claimed that this "vague designation" had been invented by men who wished to stir dissent by placing suspicion on every head. On 1 Germinal (21 March) he fought against the police bill proposed by Emmanuel-Joseph Sieyès, and when Jean-Lambert Tallien attacked the Constitution of Year I, Goujon threatened him with the anger of the people.

== Downfall ==
When the populace invaded the legislature on the 1 Prairial Year III (20 May 1795), he proposed the immediate establishment of a special commission to ensure delivery of the changes demanded by the insurgents and assume the functions of the various committees.

The failure of the Prairial insurrection led to the immediate fall of those deputies who had supported the demands of the populace. Before the close of the sitting, Goujon, with Gilbert Romme, Jean-Michel Duroy, Adrien Duquesnoy, Pierre Bourbotte, Pierre-Aimable de Soubrany, and others were placed under arrest by their colleagues. Taken out of Paris, he and his fellow prisoners had a narrow escape from a mob at Avranches on their way to the château du Taureau (fr) in Brittany. While being held in prison there, he composed revolutionary poetry.

They were brought back to Paris for trial before a military commission on 17 June, although no proof of their complicity in organizing the insurrection could be found. (In fact, with the exception of Goujon and Bourbotte, the accused did not know each other). They were sentenced to death. In accordance with a pre-arranged plan, they attempted suicide on the staircase leading from the courtroom with a knife that Goujon had concealed. Goujon succeeded, as did Romme and Duquesnoy, but the others merely wounded themselves and were immediately taken to the guillotine.

Before his suicide, he said: "I swore to defend her (i.e. the Constitution of Year I) and die for her, I die happy not to have betrayed my oath... I would die happier if I were certain that after me, she would not be destroyed and replaced by another constitution (i.e. the Constitution of Year III) where equality is disregarded, rights violated, and that the masses will be completely subservient to the rich, sole masters of the government and of the state."

== Family ==
On 3 April 1793, in Mettray, Goujon married Lise (Marie) Cormery (1771-1843), daughter of an administrator of the département of Indre-et-Loire. Camille Desmoulins praised Goujon's letter proposing marriage to Lise Cornery, with its patriotic sentiments, as an example of upright citizenship. They had one son, Philarète, an architect, born in Paris on 28 Frimaire Year III (18 December 1794), who died without issue at Tours on 28 December 1832.

Political offices
Preceded by François Louis Michel Chemin Deforgues	Minister of Foreign Affairs; 2 April 1794 – 8 April 1794	Succeeded by Martial Herman
Preceded by Jules-François Paré	Minister of the Interior; 8 April 1794 – 20 April 1794	Succeeded by Martial Herman
