= Pierre-Amable =

Pierre-Amable is a masculine given name. Notable people with the name include:

- Pierre-Amable de Bonne, Lower Canada seigneur, lawyer, judge, and political figure
- Pierre-Amable de Soubrany, French soldier, politician, and nobleman
