= Pierre François Tissot =

French man of letters and politician

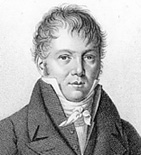
Pierre François Tissot

Pierre François Tissot (English: /tiːˈsoʊ/ tee-SOH, French: [pjɛʁ fʁɑ̃swa tiso]; 20 March 1768 – 7 April 1854) was a French man of letters and politician.

== Biography ==
=== Early years ===
Tissot was born in Versailles to a native of Savoy, who was a perfumer appointed by royal warrant to the court. At the age of eighteen he entered the service of a solicitor of the Châtelet, in order to learn the practice of the law, but he was more attracted to literature, and, as a handsome youth, was occasionally invited to the fêtes of the Petit Trianon.

=== Revolution ===
Tissot devoted himself to the cause of the French Revolution, in spite of the fact that it had ruined his family. While with the solicitor he had made the acquaintance of Alexandre Goujon, and they soon became close friends – he married Goujon's sister, Sophie (on 5 March 1793), and when his brother-in-law was elected deputy to the National Convention and sent as a representative-on-mission to the Revolutionary Armies of the Moselle and Rhine, Tissot went with him as his secretary. He then returned to Paris and resumed his more modest position of Secrétaire Général des Subsistences.

On the insurrection of Prairial 1 1795 (carried out against the Thermidorian Reaction), he tried in vain to save Goujon, who had been involved in the proscription of the "last Montagnards"; all he could do was to give Goujon the knife with which he killed himself in order to escape the guillotine, and he afterwards avenged his memory in the Souvenirs de Prairial. He also took under his care Goujon's widow and children. His connection with the Jacobin party caused him to be condemned to deportation after the Plot of the Rue Saint-Nicaise, but Napoleon Bonaparte, having been persuaded to read his translation of the Eclogues of Virgil, struck his name off the list.

=== Empire ===
Although still a partisan of the French Republic, Tissot became an admirer of the First Consul, and then of Napoléon as head of the French Empire – he celebrated in verse several of the emperor's victories, and the arrival in France of Marie Louise (1810). Prior to this moment, he had lived on the income derived from a factory of horn lanterns in the Faubourg Saint Antoine; finally in fairly comfortable circumstances, he devoted himself to literature. Jacques Delille took him as his assistant at the Collège de France, and Tissot succeeded him as head of it (1813); Napoleon signed the appointment as a reward for a poem composed by Tissot on his victory in the Battle of Lützen.

=== Restoration and July Monarchy ===
He was removed from this post, however, in 1821, following the publication of a Précis sur les guerres de la Révolution, which, in the context of the Bourbon Restoration, had ventured to say that the Convention had saved France and vanquished the First Coalition during the French Revolutionary Wars.

Deprived of his post, Tissot was left still more free to attack the government in the press. He was one of the founders of the newspaper Le Constitutionnel, and of the review, the Minerve. Without laying stress on his literary works (Traité de la poésie latine, 1821; translation of the Bucolics, 3rd ed., 1823; Études sur Virgile, 1825) we should mention the Mémoires historiques et militaires sur Carnot (on Lazare Carnot, which he based on the papers left by the "Organizer of Victory"; 1824), the Discours du Général Foy (1826) and a Histoire de la guerre de la Péninsule – both inspired by General Foy (1827).

On the overthrow of Charles X (the July Revolution), Tissot made a successful effort to regain his position at the Collège de France; under the July Monarchy, he was also elected as a member of the Académie française on the death of Bon-Joseph Dacier (1833). It was then that he published his chief works: Histoire de Napoléon (2 vols., 1833), and Histoire complète de la révolution française de 1789 à 1806 (6 vols., 1833–1836), comprising several inconsistencies and omissions, but containing a number of the author's reminiscences (in some places they become practically memoirs, and are consequently of real value).

In 1840 a carriage accident almost cost him his sight; he had to find an assistant, and passed the last years of his life in circumstances of increasing suffering, amid which, however, he preserved his optimism. He died in Paris.
