= Goujon (surname) =

The surname Goujon is a French surname. Notable people with the surname include:

- Jean Goujon (c. 1510 – c. 1565), French Renaissance sculptor
- Jean Goujon (cyclist) (1914–1991), French cyclist
- Jean-Marie Claude Alexandre Goujon (1766–1795), politician of the French Revolution
- Philippe Goujon (born 1954), French politician
