= Helleville =

- Commune
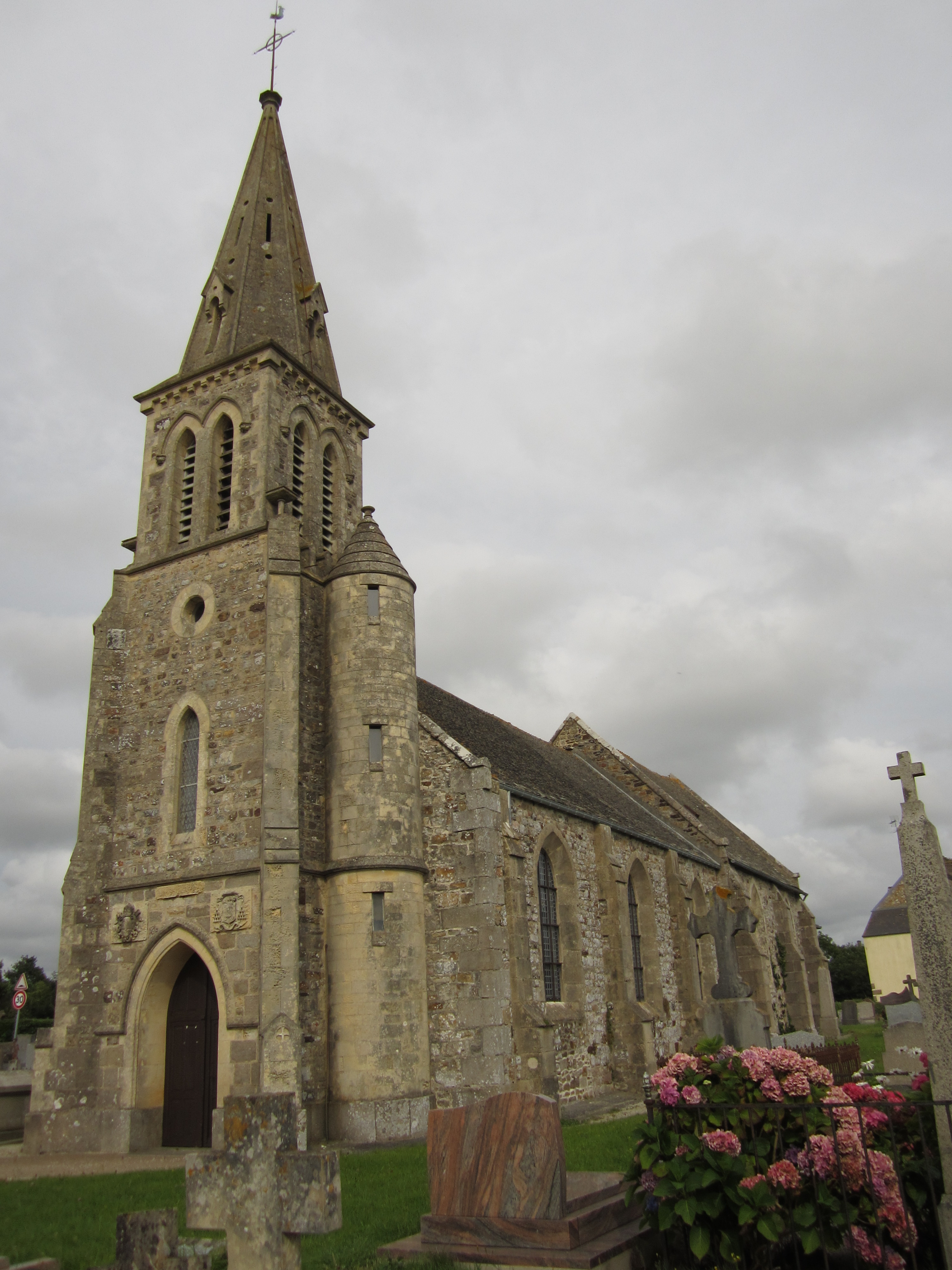
- The church of Saint-Pierre
- Location of Helleville
- Location within France Location within Normandy
- Coordinates: 49°33′19″N 1°46′56″W
- Country: France
- Region: Normandy
- Department: Manche
- Arrondissement: Cherbourg
- Canton: Les Pieux
- Intercommunality: CA Cotentin

Government
  - Mayor (2020–2026): Jean-François Lamotte
- Area^{1}: 5.88 km^{2} (2.27 sq mi)
- Elevation: 110 m (360 ft)
- Highest elevation: 138 m (453 ft)
- Lowest elevation: 60 m (200 ft)
- Population (2023): 567
  - Density: 96.4/km^{2} (250/sq mi)
- Time zone: UTC+01:00 (CET)
  - Summer (DST): UTC+02:00 (CEST)
- INSEE/Postal code: 50240 /50340
- ^{1} French Land Register data, which excludes lakes, ponds, glaciers > 1 km^{2} (0.386 sq mi or 247 acres) and river estuaries.

Helleville (French pronunciation: [ɛlvil]) is a commune in the Manche department in north-western France.

== See also ==
- Communes of the Manche department
