= Ernest Dominique François Joseph Duquesnoy =

French revolutionary (1749–1795)

Ernest Dominique François Joseph Duquesnoy (17 May 1749, in Bouvigny-Boyeffles – 17 June 1795, in Paris) was a French revolutionary.

== Life ==
The son of a farmer, he served time as a private in the dragoons then (at the start of the French Revolution) moved to farming and raising his large family. He was elected a député for the Pas-de-Calais to the Assemblée législative, then to the National Convention. At the trial of Louis XVI he voted for death without appeal to the people, not for the sentence, and forced his colleague Bollet to vote the same by threats. He took on many missions to the Nord and was absent during the struggle between the Montagnards and Girondists. He was sent to Dunkirk with Lazare Carnot and fought with courage at the Battle of Wattignies, where he charged the enemy at the head of his troops. He was very severe with incompetent generals, notably dismissing Jean Nestor de Chancel and Jean-Baptiste Davaine who were both executed. Denounced by Hébert for allegedly impeding army operations of Jourdan and taking advantage of his position to put his brother at the head of the army, he was rescued by Maximilien Robespierre and had no difficulty proving his innocence. He warmly defended Jean-Baptiste Jourdan before the Committee of Public Safety and probably saved him from the guillotine.

Sent back to the Nord, then to Moselle, according to his colleague Nicolas Hentz, Duquesnoy forgot his dignity as a representative and behaved with an insupportable despotism. Recalled to Paris on 10 August 1794, he succeeded in excluding Jean-Lambert Tallien from the club des Jacobins and having Armand-Joseph Guffroy beaten before Carnot. Guffroy complained to the Committee of General Security and, accused of being one of the leaders of the insurrection of 1 prairial an III (20 May 1795), Duquesnoy was condemned to death despite his friends' depositions. However, he succeeded in committing suicide by pistol in the condemned prisoners' bathroom, writing to his wife after his sentence "You know my heart, it was always pure. I die worthy of you and of my country for whose safety and for whose revolutionary principles I have never ceased to fight".
