= Nicolas Hentz =

French revolutionary and politician

Nicolas Charles Arnould Hentz
- Born: 5 June 1753; Metz, France
- Disappeared: Northeastern Pennsylvania
- Died: 1 July 1830 (aged 77); Possibly in Wilkes-Barre, Pennsylvania
- Occupations: Politician, representative on mission
- Political party: The Mountain
- Movement: French Revolution
- Spouse: Therese d'Aubree
- Children: 2

Nicolas Charles Arnould Hentz (5 June 1753, Metz, France – after 1 July 1830, Pennsylvania) was a French revolutionary and politician. After fleeing France in 1815, he assumed the name Charles Arnould.

== Early life ==
Coming from a family of nineteen children of a farrier, Nicolas Hentz was born in Metz, France on 5 June 1753. In 1780 he became a lawyer at the Parliament of Metz. He was elected Justice of the Peace of Sierck-les-Bains in December 1790, and embraced the revolutionary ideas. As Justice of the Peace, he made arrests of emigres on the road to Trier. He was a deputy for Moselle to the Revolutionary National Convention 1789 after which he was elected MP for the Moselle in September 1792. Hentz belonged to the party of the Montagne in the National Assembly of France during the French Revolution. He became a member of the Legislation Committee, where he proposed a limitation of inheritances.

== Regicide and revolution ==
At the trial of King Louis XVI in December 1792, he voted for the guilt of the king, the ratification of the judgment against the people, against the stay and for the death penalty. In the year 1793, he was sent as a representative on mission to ensure the reform of the army and the military's compliance with the revolution. From April to July, he was sent as commissioner to the Army of the Ardennes. He did not participate in elections relating to impeachment of Jean-Paul Marat nor the conviction (and subsequent executions) of Girondins such as Georges Danton. From August to September, he was on a mission to the northern army, where he arrested General Houchard, who he considered to be a "creature and successor of Custine's" who had recently been accused of treason and executed. In October, another mission took him to the Western army; in November, he was back to the Army of the Ardennes and the Moselle and the North. He returned to Paris in late November 1793 and left immediately for the northern army, where he remained until mid-January 1794.

=== Controversy ===
1794 marks the downfall of Hentz's career as an influential French politician. Hentz was with the Western army from February to May where the tragic shootings in the Vendee were blamed on his "reckless zeal." Hentz left the Army of the Rhine after being accused of overzealous violence and the burning of the town of Kusel on 26 July 1794. He returned to Paris in August.

Moreaux recognized the conduct of Saint-Cyr and Oudinot in his order of the day. On 10 June National Convention deputy Nicolas Hentz insisted that Saint-Cyr be elevated to general of brigade since he already commanded a brigade. When Saint-Cyr objected, the politician compelled him to accept the promotion by threatening to put him under police observation. Within a few days Hentz again promoted him to general of division. Saint-Cyr gave the excuse that another general with the same family name, Louis-Jean-Baptiste Gouvion was in disgrace and that suspicion would fall on himself. Hentz overrode this objection saying, "Is it only that? Can a brave man like you be hindered from serving the Republic well because there is a rascal in his family? You shall be general of division. I will it!" Saint-Cyr's fears were well-founded. In 1793, the revolutionaries executed 17 generals and in 1794 the number rose to 67. Saint-Cyr was assigned command of the 2nd Division of the Army of the Rhine while Oudinot received the rank of general of brigade in the Army of the Moselle.

== Work under Napoleon ==
Upon the death of Robespierre, he briefly fled to Germany under the assumed name of Charles Arnould but returned under the French Consulate. He became known for his work on the legislative committee specifically in compiling the "Code Napoleon".

== Emigration to the United States ==
Upon the Bourbon Restoration in 1815, Hentz was ordered to leave France with his family within thirty days, otherwise he would be imprisoned for life. Nicolas Hentz and his family then sailed for the United States. He settled in Wilkes-Barre, Pennsylvania in Pennsylvania, where he appears in the 1830 census with his wife, Theresa, and one of his sons. He died after 1 July 1830. Before he died, he wrote a short treatise called Danton, Robespierre and Marat in which he maintained "Behold, these three men, who have been erected into a 'detestable triumvirate.' I have believed it my duty... to attempt to recover the fellow-citizens of my adopted country from the abyss of error into which the English ministry has plunged them."

== Family ==
Hentz married Therese d'Aubree in France. They had two sons, Nicholas Richard Hentz (1786–1850) and Nicolas Marcel (1797–1856). The latter was known in the United States under the name of Nicholas Marcellus Hentz, became a painter, professor and was one of the founders of the arachnology. He was educated at Harvard University, and taught at George Bancroft's Round Hill School in Northampton. On 30 September 1824 his son married the novelist Caroline Lee Whiting.

The oldest son, Richard, was born in Metz in 1786. He served in the French Imperial Army (1806–1815) before he fled with his father to the United States. Initially the family settled in Wilkes-Barre. In 1830, Richard moved with his family to Towanda, in Bradford County, and from there to Mobile, Alabama, where he and his wife Adelaide died in 1850.

== Sources ==
- Hentz, Nicolas, Danton, Robespierre and Marat, up, 1844.
