= Jean-Lambert Tallien =

French politician (1767–1820)

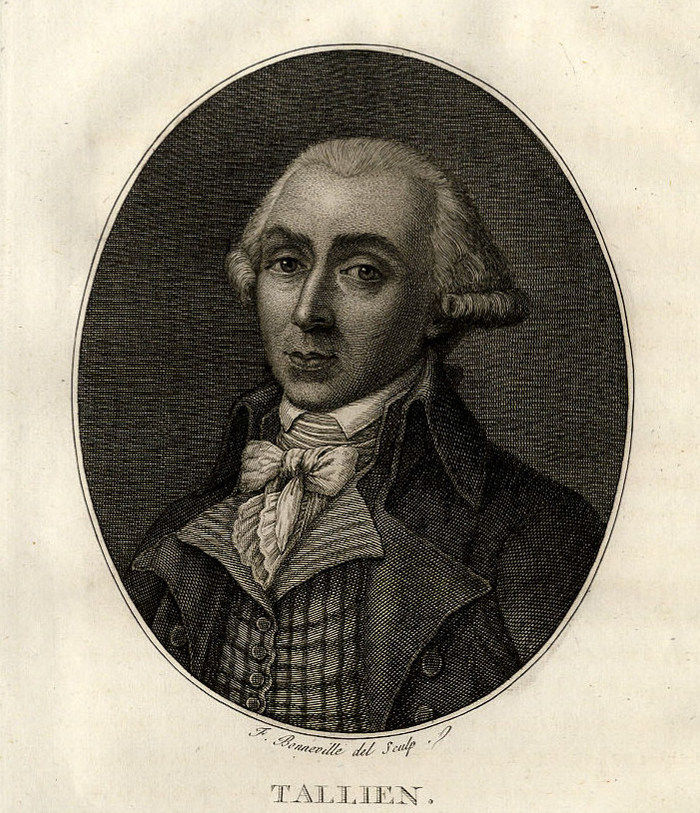
- Portrait by François Bonneville, late 18th century

39th President of the National Convention
- In office 21 March 1794 – 5 April 1794
- Preceded by: Philippe Rühl
- Succeeded by: Jean-Pierre-André Amar

Deputy in the National Convention
- In office 20 September 1792 – 2 November 1795
- Constituency: Seine-et-Oise

Deputy in the Council of Five Hundred
- In office 2 November 1795 – 10 November 1799
- Constituency: Seine-et-Oise

Personal details
- Born: 23 January 1767 Paris, Kingdom of France
- Died: 16 November 1820 (aged 53) Paris, Kingdom of France
- Resting place: Père Lachaise Cemetery
- Party: Jacobin (1789–1794); Montagnard (1792–1794); Thermidorian (1794–1799)
- Spouse: Thérésa Tallien (m. 1794; div. 1802)
- Occupation: Politician, journalist, representative on mission
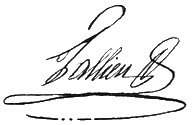
- Signature

Jean-Lambert Tallien (French pronunciation: [ʒɑ̃ lɑ̃bɛʁ taljɛ̃], 23 January 1767 – 16 November 1820) was a French politician of the revolutionary period. Though initially an active agent of the Reign of Terror, he eventually clashed with its leader, Maximilien Robespierre, and is best known as one of the key figures of the Thermidorian Reaction that led to the fall of Robespierre and the end of the Terror.

== Early life and journalism ==
Tallien was born in Paris to Lambert Tallien, the maître d'hôtel of the Marquis de Bercy, and Jeanne Lambert. The marquis, noticing his ability, had him educated, and got him a place as a lawyer's clerk. Supportive of the Revolution, he gave up his desk to enter a printer's office, and by 1791 was overseer of the printing department of the Comte de Provence.

During his employment, he conceived the idea of the journal-affiche, and after the arrest of the king at Varennes in June 1791 he placarded a large printed sheet on all the walls of Paris twice a week, under the title of the L'Ami des Citoyens, journal fraternel. This enterprise had its expenses paid by the Jacobin Club and made Tallien well known to the revolutionary leaders. He became even more present in politics after organizing, together with Jean-Marie Collot d'Herbois, the great Fête de la Liberté on 15 April 1792, honouring the release of the Swiss régiment de Châteauvieux, imprisoned since the Nancy Mutiny of 1790.

=== Paris Commune ===
On 8 July 1792, he was the spokesman of a deputation of the section of the Place Royale which demanded from the Legislative Assembly the reinstatement of the Mayor, Jérôme Pétion de Villeneuve, and the Procureur, Louis Pierre Manuel. Tallien was one of the most active popular leaders in the storming of the Tuileries Palace on 10 August; on that day he was appointed secretary to the insurrectional Commune of Paris. He committed himself to his new mission and habitually appeared at the bar of the Assembly on behalf of the Commune. He participated in the September Massacres of 1792, and, with the help of Georges Danton, would eventually be elected a member of the National Convention. He announced the September Massacres in terms of apology and praise, and he sent off the famous circular of 3 September to the French departments, recommending them to take similar action. At the same time, he had several people imprisoned in order to save them from the violence of the mob and protected several suspects himself.

== National Convention and missions ==
Tallien resigned his post in the Commune on being elected, in spite of his youth, deputy to the National Convention by the department of Seine-et-Oise, and he began his legislative career by defending the conduct of the Commune during the massacres. He took his seat upon The Mountain, and showed himself one of the most vigorous Jacobins, particularly in his defence of Jean-Paul Marat, on 26 February 1793; he voted in favor of the execution of King Louis XVI, and was elected member of the Committee of General Security on 21 January 1793, the day of the King's execution.

He was sent as representative on mission to the department of Indre-et-Loire in March 1793, and after returning to Paris took an active part in the insurrection of 31 May, which resulted in the overthrow of the Girondists. For the next few months he kept a low profile, but on 23 September 1793 Tallien was sent with Claude-Alexandre Ysabeau on a mission to Bordeaux. This was the month in which the Reign of Terror was organized under the superintendence of the Committees of Public Safety and Committee of General Security. On 6 October he arrived in Saint-Émilion to arrest suspect deputies. Not long after the introduction of the Law of 22 Prairial, Jérôme Pétion de Villeneuve and Francois Buzot committed suicide; Marguerite-Élie Guadet and Charles Barbaroux were guillotined.

Tallien was one of the most notorious envoys sent over to establish the Terror in the departments, and soon established a revolutionary grip on Bordeaux. The young Tallien, who was not yet 27, became notorious for his administration of justice in Bordeaux through his bloody affinity to "feed la sainte guillotine". Tallien's methodology of subjugation at Bordeaux has been described as "fear and flour": the guillotining of Girondist leaders and exploitation of food shortages by withholding bread from the already-hungry province. However, after the initial days of his mission in Bordeaux, Tallien began to shift away from his bloody Terrorist tendencies. This tendency may be due to his romantic involvement with Thérésa Cabarrús, the daughter of Francisco Cabarrús and former wife of the émigré Marquis de Fontenay. Tallien not only spared her life but fell in love with her. As she was extremely wealthy and desired by many, it is possible that she became involved with Tallien in order to escape from the guillotine at Bordeaux and influence him to show lenience towards her aristocratic associates. Tallien suggested, "It is better to marry than to be beheaded."

After Tallien became involved with Cabarrús, there was a notable decline in the number of executions in Bordeaux. Thérésa was a moderating influence, and for the lives she saved by her entreaties she received the name of Notre-Dame de Thermidor ("Our Lady of Thermidor") after the onset of the Thermidorian Reaction in July 1794. Tallien was elected president of the Convention on 24 March 1794 until 5 April and had to deal with the trial of Georges Danton and Camille Desmoulins.

== Thermidorian Reaction ==
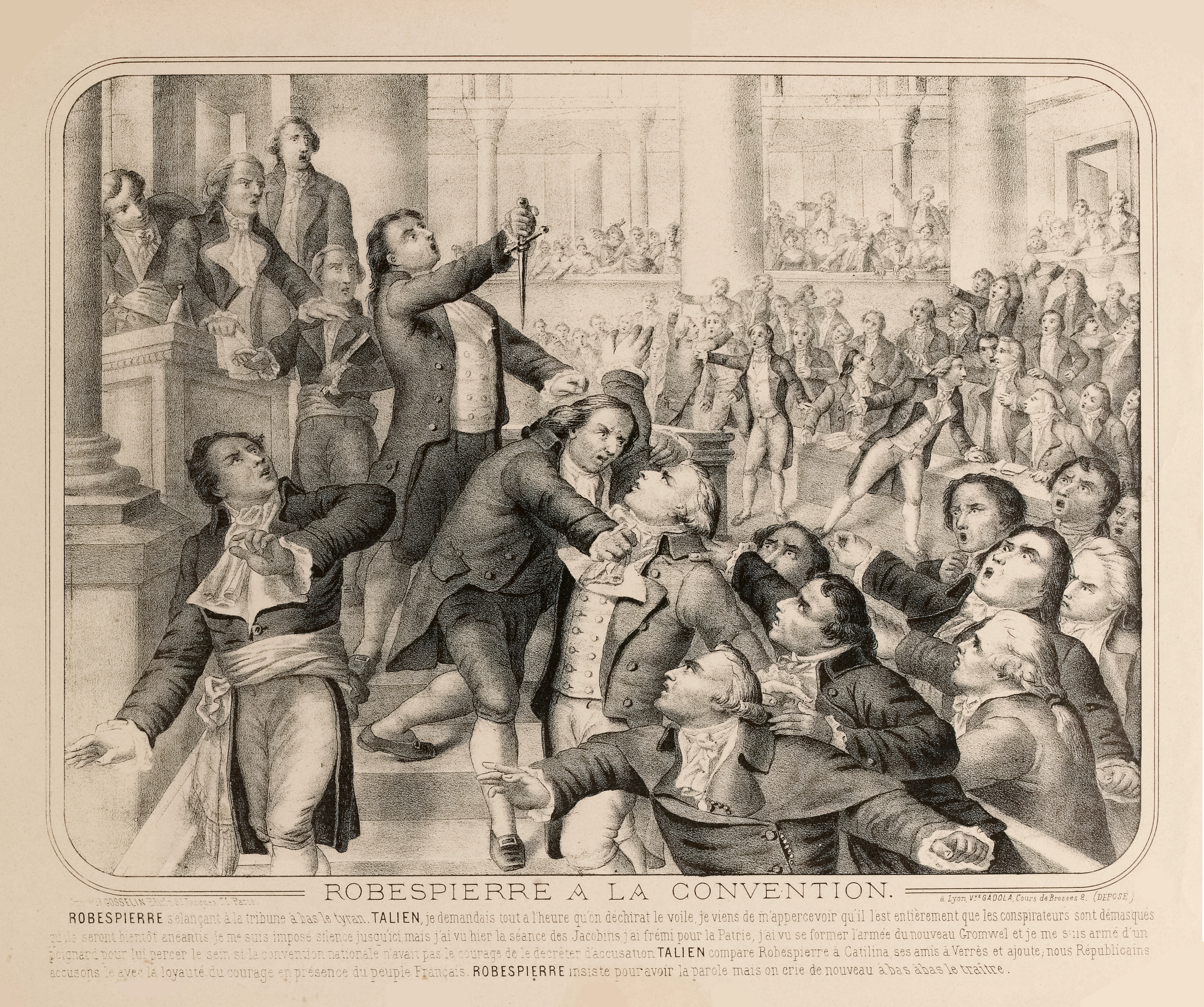
On 9 Thermidor, Tallien threatened to use a dagger against Robespierre before the National Convention if the deputies did not decree his accusation

Tallien was recalled to Paris from Bordeaux after being denounced by the Committee of Public Safety for "modérantisme". Cabarrús, who had accompanied him, was arrested for a second time and imprisoned. She was set to face trial and probably would have been executed. She sent a letter to Tallien on 26 July, which included a dagger and a note accusing him of weakness for not attempting to free her. Thérésa stated, "I die in despair at having belonged to a coward like you." In Prairial (May–June) he was expelled from the Jacobin Club by Robespierre, and from then on Tallien became a leading conspirator for his overthrow, allying himself with other opposers of the Terror.

Robespierre's own political ideas implied his readiness to strike at many of his colleagues in the committees, and Tallien was one of the men condemned. Robespierre's rivals were determined to strike first. During a session at the National Convention on 9 Thermidor (27 July), Tallien interrupted Robespierre helper Louis Antoine de Saint-Just and, after going up to the tribune: "Yesterday a member of the government was left quite isolated and made a speech in his own name; today another one has done the same thing. Tallien continued: "Need I recall to you that expression addressed [by Robespierre] to the journalists in one of the last sittings of the Jacobins? "I prohibit you from inserting my discourses in your papers till you have previously communicated them to me." He brandished a dagger and threatened to stab Robespierre in the chest if the Convention did not decree his accusation, calling him "the new Cromwell". The movement was successful: Robespierre and his closest allies were arrested and guillotined on the next day. Tallien, as the leading Thermidorian, was elected to the Committee of Public Safety. He was instrumental in suppressing the Revolutionary Tribunal and the Jacobin Club; he attacked Jean-Baptiste Carrier and Joseph Le Bon, who had been representatives of the Committee to Nantes and Arras respectively, and he fought with energy against the insurgents of Prairial (20 May 1795).

Tallien's actions and his motivation behind his shifting loyalties have been described thus: "His only claim to a place in history was to have realized that people were sick of the terror, that the inevitable reaction was imminent, and that it was better to be a part of it than to be crushed by it." In all these months he was supported by Thérèse, whom he married on 26 December 1794, and who became the leader of the social life of Paris. This cemented Tallien's transition from the infamous Terrorist at Bordeaux to the "reformed terrorist" of the Thermidorian reaction.

On 18th Thermidor, in order to secure the release of his mistress, to gain popular support, and to popularize his image as a Thermidorian (rather than a Jacobin), Tallien stated, "There is not a single man in prison today who does not claim to be an ardent patriot and who has not been an enemy of Robespierre's." In the next five days, nearly 500 prisoners, many of whom were moderates or right-wing opposition to Robespierre and the leftist Jacobins, were released. Tallien and the Thermidorians almost immediately repealed the law of 22 Prairial, ending the power of the Committee of Public Safety to arrest representatives without a hearing. In addition, measures were passed causing one-fourth of the Committee to be up for election each month, with a one-month period between the terms that deputies could serve on the Committee.

For Tallien's role in 9 Thermidor, he was elected to the Committee of Public Safety. In a complete reversal of his earlier positions, Tallien appealed to the new rising class of the jeunesse dorée ("gilded youth"), who viewed him as their leader, by stating "I sincerely admit that I had rather see twenty aristocrats set at liberty today and re-arrested tomorrow than see a single patriot left in chains." In addition, Tallien helped pass a measure that would publish the lists of the freed prisoners, helping ensure that the National Convention would be accountable for any imprisonments. Furthermore, he promoted a compromise that prevented a list of those who acted as guarantees for the loyalty of released prisoners. This prevented him from being publicly accountable for the release of his mistress and future wife. Shortly after, Tallien and his allies Freron and Lecointre were removed from the Jacobin clubs.

On the 23rd of Fructidor, an assassination attempt was made on Tallien. The minor gunshot wound and knife wound gave Tallien and his allies the necessary public support to begin their attacks on the Jacobin clubs. With the threat of a Jacobin-Terrorist plot in the air, Tallien and Freron used public proclamations and physical intimidation (through the jeunesse dorée) to wipe out the central Parisian Jacobin club. Tallien began campaigning for free speech in 1795. This increased his popularity with the jeunesse dorée, as many were journalists. He reestablished his paper, L'Ami des Citoyens, and contributed to the unified attack of the Thermidorians on the remaining Jacobins. Although the journalistic freedom gave the Jacobins the legal opportunity to also mount an attack through the press, their Thermidorian opponents were far more unified. Thermidorian journalists had even got into high positions on Jacobin newspapers.

In addition, the Thermidorians did nothing to stop the monarchist resurgence. Eventually, the Thermidorians ordered that all émigrés and émigré supporters hand over their weapons and expel all foreigners from the country. However, there is evidence that Tallien was arranging a compromise with Spain and would support the imposition of Louis XVIII as a king "without the abuses". In July 1795, a large division of émigrés, with support from the British, attempted to invade through Quiberon. However, General Lazare Hoche outmaneuvered the émigrés and trapped them on the end of the Quiberon peninsula. Tallien was sent by the National Convention to the scene. Partially because Tallien had been corresponding with the Bourbons in Spain, he set up military commissions to put all of the émigré prisoners on trial. Under current law, all of the émigrés were convicted and summarily executed. Tallien was held responsible and lost support from the jeunesse dorée and Thermidorians. His political influence were thus greatly reduced.

== Council of Five Hundred and Egyptian campaign ==
After the beginning of the French Directory, Tallien's political importance came to an end, for, although he sat in the Council of Five Hundred, the moderates viewed him as an enforcer of the Terror, and the extreme party as a renegade. Madame Tallien also rejected him, and became the mistress of the rich banker Gabriel-Julien Ouvrard.

Napoleon Bonaparte, however, who is said to have been introduced by him to Paul Barras, took him on to his military expedition to Egypt of June 1798 as part of the political economy section of the Institut d'Égypte, and after the capture of Cairo, he edited the official journal there, the Décade Égyptienne. General Jacques François Menou sent him back to France. On his passage, he was captured by a British cruiser and taken to London, where he had a good reception among the Whigs and was received by Charles James Fox.

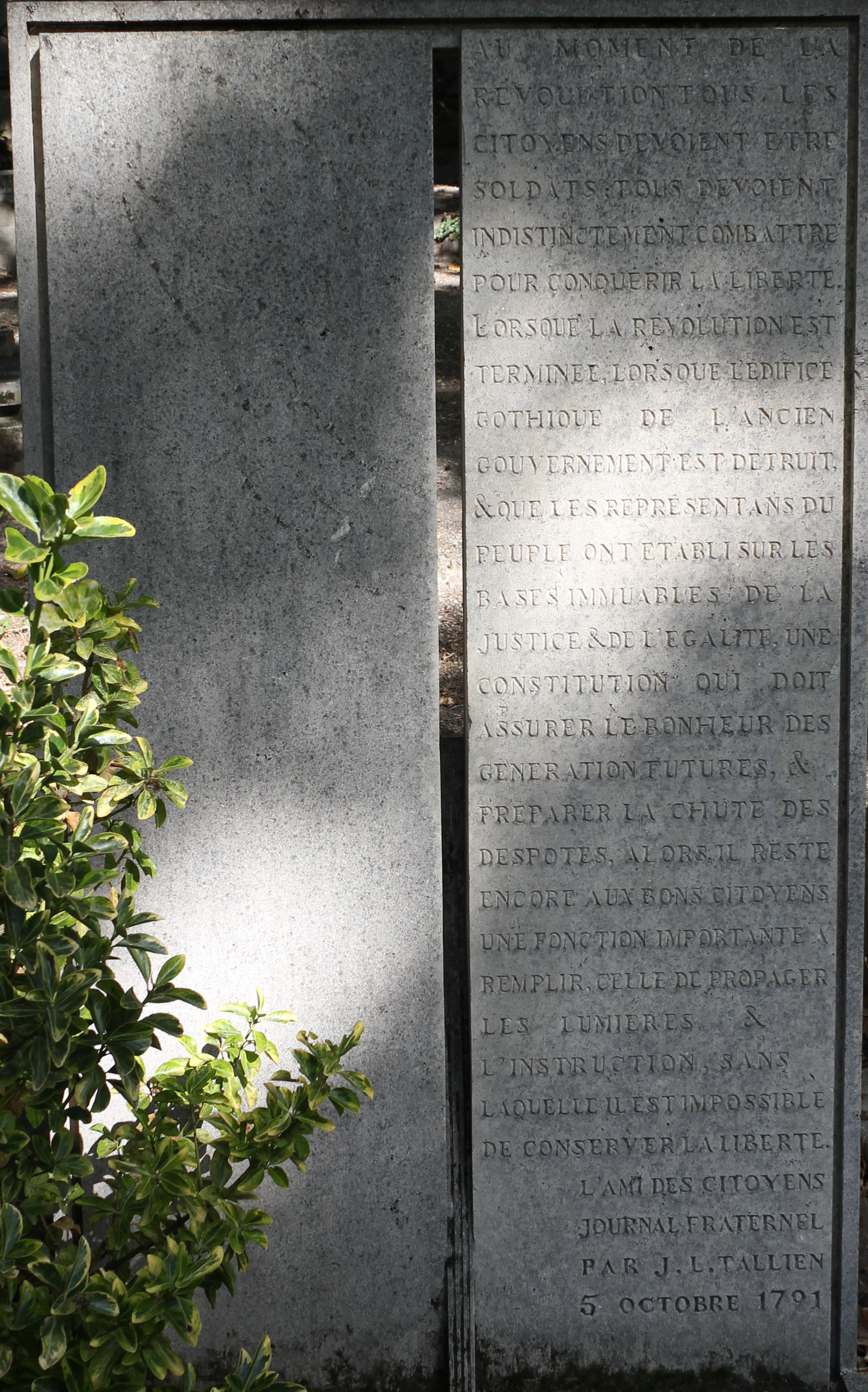
Tallien's tombstone in the Père Lachaise Cemetery, dedicated with an excerpt from his periodical "L'ami des citoyens, journal fraternel"

== Later years ==
On returning to France in 1802 he obtained a divorce from Thérésa (who in 1805 married François-Joseph-Philippe de Riquet) and was left for some time without employment. Eventually, through the interventions of Joseph Fouché and Charles Maurice de Talleyrand, Tallien was appointed consul at Alicante, and remained there until he lost the sight of one eye from yellow fever.

Back in Paris, Tallien lived on half-pay until the fall of the Empire and the Bourbon Restoration in 1815, when he received the favour of not being exiled like the other regicides (those who had voted for the Louis XVI's execution) due to his poor health. He spent his last years in poverty, living in a small house in the Allée des Veuves. He was forced to sell his collection of books in order to sustain himself, and in May 1818 asked the government of King Louis XVIII for some relief money, which was granted in 1000 francs by minister Élie Decazes. Tallien died of leprosy on 16 November 1820, and was buried in the Père Lachaise Cemetery.

== Works ==
=== Magazines ===
Tallien wrote for the following magazines:

- L'Ami des citoyens
- L'Ami des sans-culottes
- Le Sans-culotte (1793)
- Le Courier de l'Armée des côtes de La Rochelle
- La Décade egyptienne (1798-1800)

=== Other works ===
- 1789 - Mémoire sur la liberté de la presse, suivi de quelques autres mémoires concernant la librairie
- 1790 - On nous mène donc la faction orleano-angloise, ou les projets de mèchans dévoilés
- Discours sur les causes qui ont produit la Révolution française (Paris, 1791, 8 vols)
- 1792 - Detail et ordre de la marche de la fête en l'honneur de la liberté, donnée par le peuple à l'occasion de l'arrivée des soldats de Chateau-Vieux, le dimanche 15 avril 1792, l'an quatrième de la liberté. Paris: De l'imprimerie de Tremblay
- 1792 - La vérité sur les événemens du 2 septembre. Paris: De l'Imprimerie nationale
- 1793 - Projets de décrets concernant Louis Capet. Présentés à la Convention nationale par J.L. Tallien, député du département de Seine & -Oise. Paris: De l'Imprimerie nationale
- 1793 - Rapport des commissaires envoyés à Forges-les-Eaux, département de la Seine-inférieure, pour constater les faits relatifs au suicide de l'assassin Pâris. Paris: De l'Imprimerie nationale
- 1794 - Tallien, représentant du peuple, a ses collègues. A Paris: De l'imprimerie de Rougiff
- 1794 - Éclaircissemens véridiques de Tallien, représentant du peuple, envoyé en mission à Bordeaux. En réponse aux Eclaircissemens nécessaires de Collot, ancien membre du Comité de salut public
- 1794 - Discours prononcé a la Convention nationale, dans la séance du 11 fructidor, l'an 2 de la République, sur les principes du gouvernement révolutionnaire. A Paris: De l'Imprimerie nationale
- 1795 - Rapport fait au nom de la commission des cinq, sur la conjuration du 13 vendémiaire
- 1795 - Rapport fait a la Convention nationale, par Tallien, dans la séance du 9 thermidor, an 3, sur la défaite des émigrés à Quiberon. A Besançon: Chez Métoyer
- 1795 - Un mot sur la nécessité de rendre les biens des condamnés. A Paris: De l'Imprimerie nationale
- 1795 - Compte rendu a la Convention nationale, en exécution du décret du 21 nivôse dernier, par Tallien, représentant du peuple, des dépenses qu'il a faites dans ses diverses missions. Paris: De l'Imprimerie nationale
- 1795 - Rapport fait a la Convention nationale, au nom de la Commission des cinq, par Tallien, dans la séance du 2 brumaire, l'an quatrième de la République française, une et indivisible. A Paris: De l'Imprimerie nationale
- 1795 - Rapport et projet de décret, présentés au nom du Comité de salut public, par Tallien, dans la séance du 27 germinal, an 3, relativement à une nouvelle organisation des transports militaires. A Paris: De l'Imprimerie nationale
- 1797 - Motion d'ordre du représentant du peuple Tallien, sur les circonstances actuelles, prononcée dans la séance du Conseil des cinq-cents, le 6 thermidor, an 5. A Paris: Chez G.-F. Galletti
- 1798 - Opinion de Tallien, contre le projet de la Commission de finances, sur les tabacs
- Mémoire sur l'administration de l'Égypte a l'arrivée des Français
