= Insurrection of 12 Germinal Year III =

Popular revolt in Paris on 1 April 1795

The insurrection 12 Germinal Year III
- Part of the French Revolution
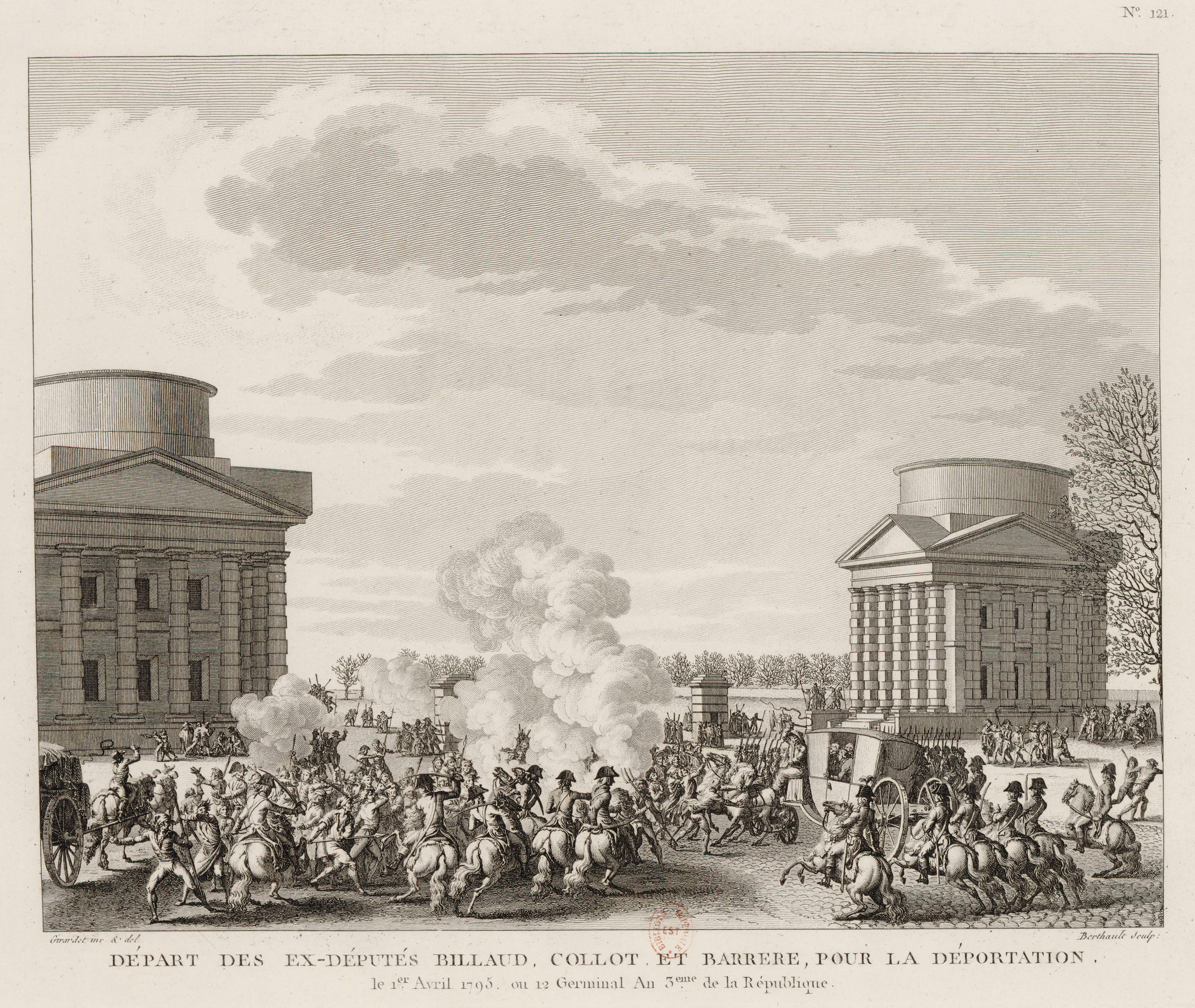
- The deportation of former members of the Comité de salut public Barère, Billaud-Varenne and Collot d’Herbois
Date	12 Germinal (1 April 1795)
Location	Paris, France

The insurrection of 12 Germinal Year III was a popular revolt in Paris on 1 April 1795 against the policies of the Thermidorian Convention. It was provoked by poverty and hunger resulting from the abandonment of the controlled economy after the dismantling of the Revolutionary Government during the Thermidorian Reaction.
