= General Maximum =

Price control law enacted during the French Revolution

The Law of the General Maximum (French: Loi du Maximum général) was instituted during the French Revolution on 29 September 1793, setting price limits and punishing price gouging to attempt to ensure the continued supply of food to the French capital. It was enacted as an extension of the Law of Suspects of 17 September, and succeeded the Law of the Maximum of 4 May 1793, which served a similar purpose.

== Background ==
Competing theories exist as to the causes of the conditions the General Maximum was intended to ameliorate. In 1912, the historian Andrew Dickson White suggested that the ever-greater and ultimately uncontrolled issuance of paper money authorised by the National Assembly was at the root of France's economic failure and constituted the cause of its increasingly rampant inflation. Eugene White, in his 1995 publication "The French Revolution and the Politics of Government Finance, 1770–1815", argues that years of revolution, international conflicts, and poor climate conditions had led to an economic environment with massive inflation and food shortages throughout France.

Although it varied according to region, the maximum price for first necessity goods was about a third higher than the 1790 prices, and the legal maximum fixed to the wages was about half higher than the average level in 1790. Committee members feared new and more radical revolutionaries were being created by the crisis. Their concern intensified on 5 September 1793, when the sans-culottes invaded the National Convention demanding "food—and to have it, force for the law".

== Content ==
On 29 September 1793, the Law of Suspects was extended to include the General Maximum. The Law of Suspects was initially created to deal with counter-revolutionaries, but hunger and poverty were seen by the Committee of Public Safety as dangerous to both the national interest and their positions within the government. The law set forth uniform price ceilings on grain, flour, meat, oil, onions, soap, firewood, leather, and paper; their sale were regulated a third over the maximum price set in 1790.

Written into the text of the law were regulations and fines. Merchants had to post their maximum rates in a conspicuous location for all consumers to see and were subject to repeated inspections by police and local officials. Furthermore, the law gave legal protection to consumers who reported violations of the Maximum to local officials. If the consumer did not have a role in the infraction and gave report to the proper authorities denouncing the merchant, fines would be levied against only shop owners.

== Example ==
The following table is an excerpt from the decree issued on 13 October 1792 by the administration for the district of Le Mans, department of Sarthe.

Fruits for eating, and others
Item	Price, in pounds
Apples, first quality, bushel	£1 10s
Idem, second quality, bushel	£1
Pears, first quality, bushel	£2
Idem, second quality, bushel	£1
Potatoes, bushel	15s
Redcurrants, pound	1s 6d
Sweet cherries or geans, pound	1s
Sour cherries, pound	1s 6d
Nuts, bushel	£3
Marons, (Note: Marrons are large chestnuts, usually one per cupule, considered a premium product compared to regular chestnuts) 1st quality, bushel, full measure	£4
Idem, 2nd quality, bushel, full measure	£3 5s
Chestnuts, 1st quality, bushel, full measure	£2 10s
Idem, 2nd quality, bushel, full measure	£1 5s
Winter butter, from 1 November to 1 June, pound	15s
Idem, Summer, pound	12s
Fresh milk, no water, pint	3s
Eggs, dozen	8s
White cow cheese, six inches in diameter and three inches deep	3s
Goat cheese, dry	3s

== Effects ==
In 1793, the French Revolution caused wars with Austria, Prussia, Great Britain and Spain. The government continued to function during the economic and political crises by a series of loans, bonds and tax increases; an increasingly large amount of paper money issuance was a vain attempt to stimulate the economy. In many ways, the law actually exacerbated the problem, as the new price setting led to many food producers lowering their production or halting altogether, while many of those who continued to produce held onto their inventories, rather than sell at the legal price, which was often below the cost of production. This led to continued food shortages and recurring famines throughout the country. The Committee of Public Safety responded by sending soldiers into the countryside to arrest farmers and seize their crops. This temporarily alleviated the shortages in Paris, however it led to shortages becoming more intense in the rest of the country.

The law was written with an eye towards preventing business practices like price gouging and rent seeking, but in practice, the law targeted local shopkeepers, butchers, bakers and farmers, who were already feeling the effects of the economic downturn like other citizens.

== Conclusion ==
The General Maximum's economic impact was largely negative, as its efforts at price control led to an overall decrease in food supply and prolonged famines in parts of the country. The law amplified parts of the problem it was trying to solve. The political and symbolic impact of the General Maximum were clear, as the harsh punishments enacted upon those who breached the Maximum became a symbol of the Reign of Terror.

== Further sources ==
- Darrow, Margaret H. . "Economic Terror in the City: The General Maximum in Montauban." French Historical Studies 17, No. 2 (1991): 498–525.
- Popkin, Jeremy. A History of Modern France, third edition (2006)
- White, Eugene N. . "The French Revolution and the Politics of Government Finance, 1770–1815." The Journal of Economic History 55, No. 2 (1995): 227–255.
