= Gilbert Romme =

French politician and mathematician (1750-1795)

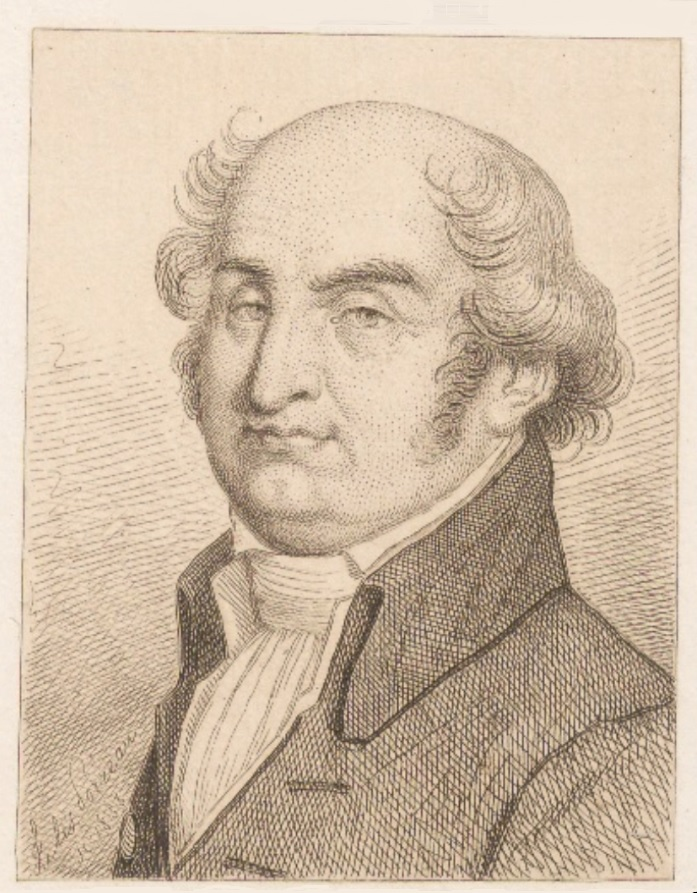
- Gilbert Romme

31st President of the National Convention
- In office 21 November 1793 – 6 December 1793
- Preceded by: Pierre Antoine Laloy
- Succeeded by: Jean-Henri Voulland

Personal details
- Born: 26 March 1750 Riom, Puy-de-Dôme, Auvergne region, France
- Died: 17 June 1795 (aged 45) Paris, France
- Cause of death: Suicide
- Party: The Mountain
- Occupation: Politician and Mathematician

Charles-Gilbert Romme (26 March 1750 – 17 June 1795) was a French politician and mathematician who developed the French Republican Calendar.

== Biography ==
Charles Gilbert Romme was born in Riom, Puy-de-Dôme, in the Auvergne region of France, where he received an education in medicine and mathematics. After spending five years in Paris, he went to Russia to become the tutor of Pavel Alexandrovich Stroganov. He returned to Paris in 1788 and entered political life.

He was a member of the Masonic lodge, Les Neuf Sœurs.

Elected on 10 September 1791 to the Legislative Assembly, Romme aligned himself with the Girondists, but after his election to the National Convention on 6 September 1792, he sided with the Montagnards.

He voted in favour of the death sentence for Louis XVI. Later, in the events leading up to the Reign of Terror, he was arrested by Girondist supporters and was imprisoned in Caen for two months.

During his tenure in National Convention, Romme served in the Committee of Public Education (Comité de l’instruction Publique), where he presented his report on the republican calendar on 17 September 1793 and then developed an agricultural almanac based on the new calendar. Aware of their military importance, he was also an early supporter of semaphore telegraphs. He served as president of the Convention from 21 November to 6 December 1793.

Because he was on an assignment to organise gun production for the navy, he had no hand in the coup of 9 Thermidor an II (27 July 1794), which resulted in the fall of the Robespierre (and ultimately led to the return of the Girondists).

When rioting sans-culottes, demanding bread and the Jacobin constitution, violently occupied the Convention on 1 Prairial an III (20 May 1795), Romme supported their demands. This insurrection was quickly put down however, and he and other Montagnards were arrested. While waiting for their trial, the defendants agreed to commit suicide in case of a death sentence.

On 29 Prairial (17 June), Paris, France, Romme and five others were sentenced to the guillotine. With a knife hidden by Jean-Marie Goujon, he stabbed himself repeatedly while on the staircase leading from the courtroom, and died - his last words are reported to have been "I die for the republic".

In Romme le Montagnard (1833), Marc de Vissac described Romme as a small, awkward and clumsy man with an ill complexion and a dull orator but also as possessing a pleasant and instructive style of conversation.

== Works ==
- 1792 - Rapport fait au nom du Comité d'instruction publique par G. Romme, député du Puy-de-Dôme, et décret rendu dans la séance du 25 novembre 1792, l'an premier de la République française, sur la suppression de la place de directeur de l'Académie de France à Rome. Paris: De l'Imprimerie nationale
- 1793 - Rapport par G. Romme, au nom du Comité d'instruction publique, sur les abus qui se commettent dans l'exécution du décret du 18 du premier mois, relatif aux emblêmes de la féodalité & de la royauté. Suivi d'un nouveau décret rendu dans la séance du 3 du deuxième mois ou du brumaire. Paris: De l'Imprimerie de la Convention
- 1793 - Rapport sur l'instruction publique, considérée dans son ensemble, suivi d'un projet de décret, sur les principales bases du plan général, présenté à la Convention nationale, au nom du Comité d'instruction publique. Paris: De l'Imprimerie nationale
- 1793 - Rapport sur l'ere de la République. Paris: De l'Imprimerie nationale
- 1793 - Projet de décret sur les écoles nationales. Paris: De l'Imprimerie nationale
- 1794 - Annuaire du cultivateur, pour la troisieme annee de la Republique, presente le 30 pluviose de l'an IIe a la Convention nationale, qui en a decrete l'impression et l'envoi, pour servir aux ecoles de la Republique. A Paris: de l'imprimerie et au bureau de la Feuille du cultivateur
- 1795 - Rapport et projet de décret, présentés à la Convention nationale, au nom du Comité d'instruction publique, par G. Romme, sur les sextiles de l'ère de la République. Paris: De l'Imprimerie nationale
- 1795 - Compte rendu par G. Romme, des dépenses qu'il a faites, des sommes qu'il a reçues & des distributions de fonds faites par ses ordres aux directeurs des fonderies chargés de fournir à la République des canons, des projectiles de guerre ou des matières en fer coulé, pendant sa mission dans le département de la Dordogne & autres circonvoisins. Paris: De l'Imprimerie nationale
- 1795 - Annuaire du cultivateur, pour la troisième année de la République, présenté le 30 pluviôse de l'an IIe à la Convention Nationale, qui en a décrété l'impression et l'envoi, pour servir aux écoles de la République. A Dijon, chez Frantin

== Sources ==
- A biography of Romme
- The French Revolution (Thomas Carlyle)
- The Semaphore Telegraph
- (in French) Gilbert Romme
- (in French) Genea Guide
