= Jean-Michel Duroy =

French politician (1753–1795)

Jean-Michel Duroy (16 December 1753, Bernay, Eure–16 June 1795, Paris) was a French député for The Mountain to the Legislative Assembly then the National Convention.

He was a member of the national convention, backed the Mountain, and voted for the execution of the king. He took part in the suppression of a revolt in Normandy.

He supported the Revolt of 1 Prairial Year III (20 May 1795), for which he was tried and executed by guillotine.
