= Pierre Bourbotte =

French politician

Pierre Bourbotte (French pronunciation: [pjɛʁ buʁbɔt]; 5 June 1763, in Vault-de-Lugny – 17 June 1795, in Paris) was a French politician during the French Revolution. He was député for the Yonne to the National Convention and served as a représentant en mission, but was later guillotined.

== Sources ==
- Adolphe Robert, Gaston Cougny, Dictionnaire des parlementaires français de 1789 à 1889, Paris, Edgar Bourloton, 1889–1891, tome 1, (de Bourbeau à Bourée), p. 431-432.
- Françoise Brunel, Sylvain Goujon, Les Martyrs de prairial: textes et documents inédits, Georg, 1992, 478 pages (ISBN 2-8257-0433-4).
- Charles Moiset, Bourbotte & Marceau, Constitution, 1899, 400 pages.
- Abbé Alexandre Parat, « Le conventionnel Bourbotte de Vault-de-Lugny », Bulletin de la Société d'Études d'Avallon, 1921, p. 27-92.
- Alois Schumacher, Idéologie révolutionnaire et pratique politique de la France en Rhénanie de 1794 à 1801, Besançon, Presses Universitaires Franche-Comté, 1989, 186 pages (ISBN 2-251-60398-0).
