= Thermidorian Reaction =

1794 French counter-revolution against Robespierre

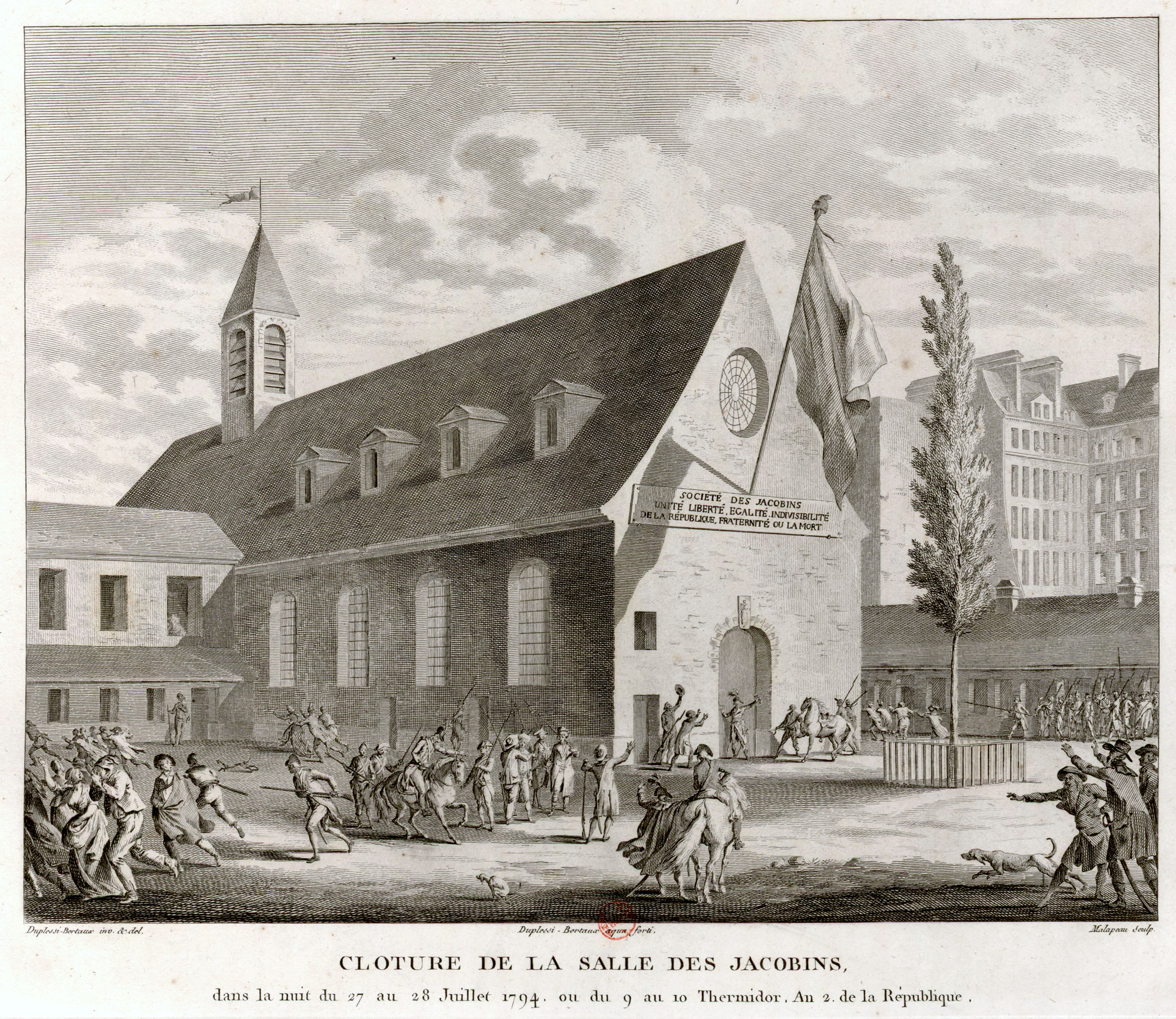
Closing of the Jacobin Club by Louis Legendre, in the early morning of 28 July 1794. Four days later it was reopened by him.

In the historiography of the French Revolution, the Thermidorian Reaction (French: Réaction thermidorienne or Convention thermidorienne, "Thermidorian Convention") is the common term for the period between the ousting of Maximilien Robespierre and politically-aligned deputies on 9 Thermidor II, or 27 July 1794, and the inauguration of the French Directory on 2 November 1795.

The Thermidorian Reaction was named after the month in which the coup took place and was the latter part of the National Convention's rule of France. It was marked by the end of the Reign of Terror, decentralization of executive powers from the Committee of Public Safety, and a turn from the radical Jacobin policies of the Montagnard Convention to more moderate positions.

Economic and general populism, dechristianization, and harsh wartime measures were largely abandoned, as the members of the convention, disillusioned and frightened of the centralized government of the Terror, preferred a more stable political order that would have the approval of the plurality. The reaction included the First White Terror, in which the left was violently suppressed; the Jacobin Club was disbanded; the sans-culottes were dispersed; and Montagnard ideology was renounced.

== Etymology and definitions ==
The name Thermidorian originated with 9 Thermidor Year II (27 July 1794), the date according to the French Republican calendar when Maximilien Robespierre and other radical revolutionaries came under concerted attack in the National Convention. Thermidorian Reaction refers to the remaining period until the National Convention was superseded by the Directory; this is also sometimes called the era of the Thermidorian Convention. Prominent figures of Thermidor include Paul Barras, Jean-Lambert Tallien, and Joseph Fouché.

== Background ==
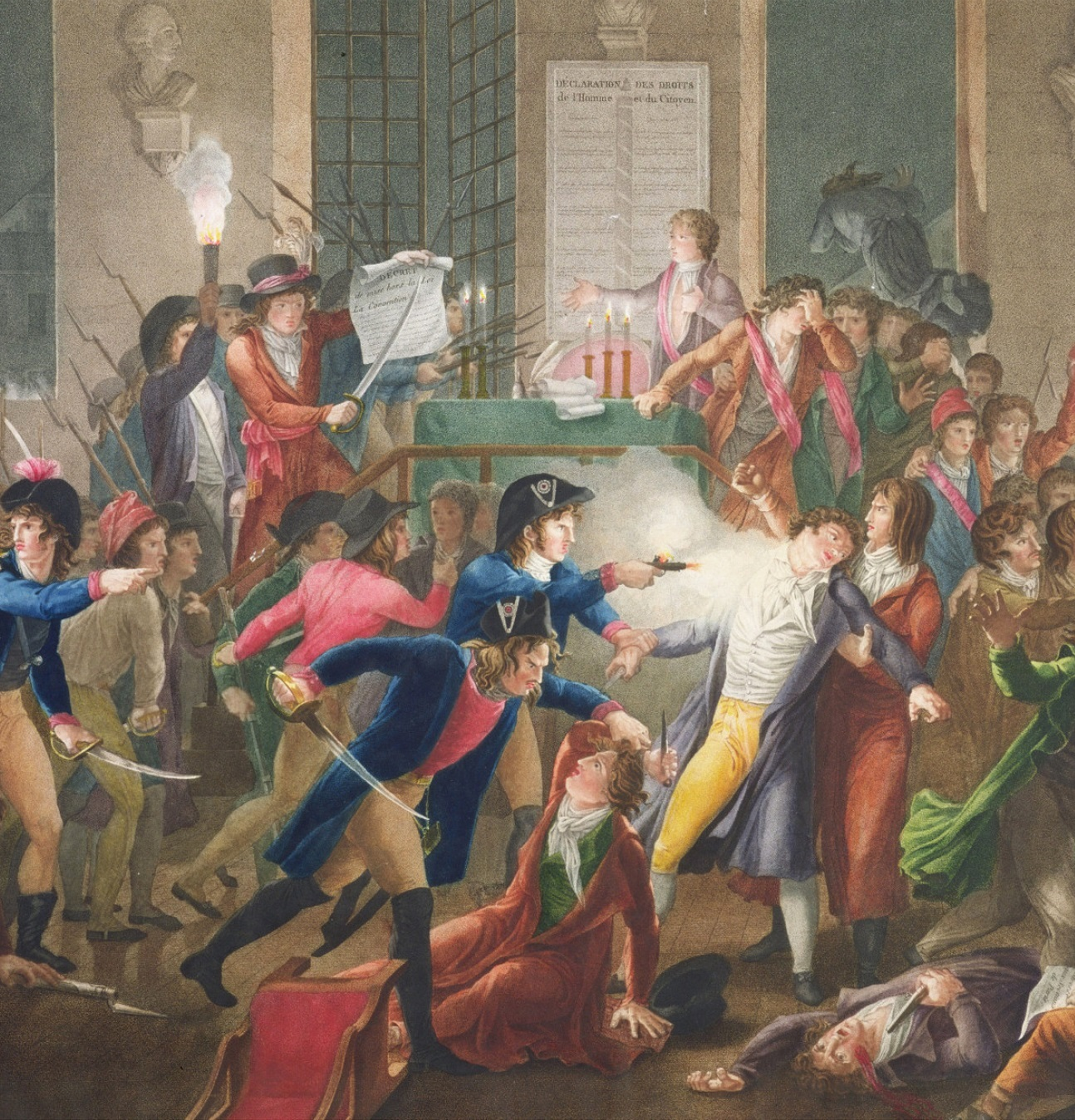
Gendarme Charles-André Merda shooting at Maximilien Robespierre

Conspiracies against Robespierre, who had dominated the Committee of Public Safety, came together on 9 Thermidor (27 July) 1794. Tallien, a member and previous president of the National Convention, impugned Louis Antoine de Saint-Just and then went on to denounce the tyranny of Robespierre. The attack was taken up by Jacques Nicolas Billaud-Varenne. Cries went up of "Down with the tyrant! Arrest him!" Robespierre then made his appeal to the deputies of the right, yet failed. An order was made to arrest Robespierre and his followers.

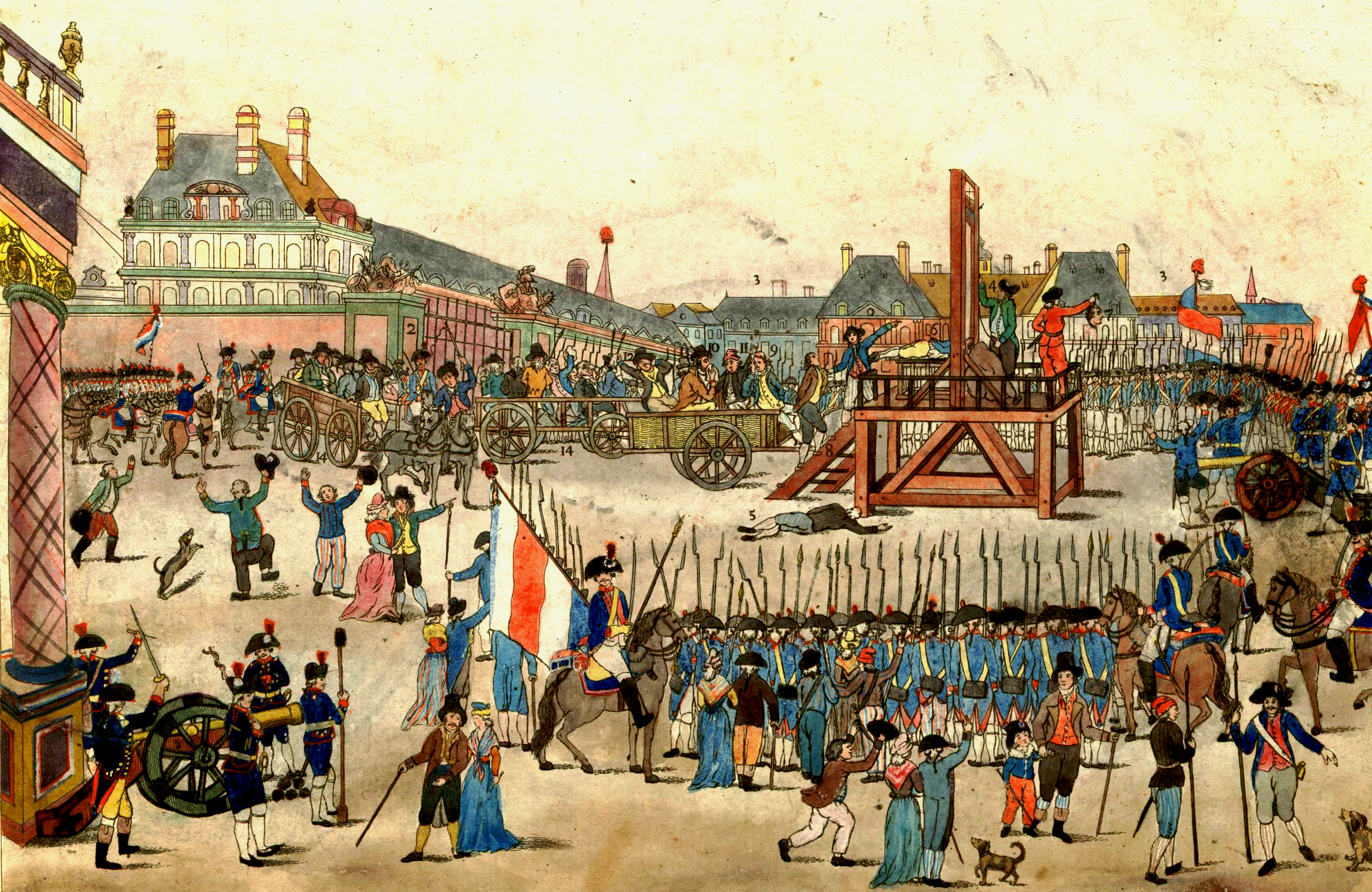
The execution of Robespierre on 28 July 1794 marked the end of the Reign of Terror

Troops from the Paris Commune, who were loyal to Robespierre, arrived to liberate him and the other prisoners. The Convention responded by ordering troops of its own under Barras to counteract. The Robespierrists barricaded at the Hôtel de Ville. The Convention declared them to be outlaws, meaning that they could be executed within 24 hours without a trial. The Commune forces at the Hôtel de Ville deserted. The Convention troops under Barras approached the Hôtel around 2 a.m. on 28 July. Robespierre, his jaw broken by a possibly self-inflicted shot, was taken with most of his supporters. Robespierre was executed the same day with 21 of his associates, including François Hanriot, ex-commander of the Parisian National Guard; Jean-Baptiste Fleuriot-Lescot, mayor of Paris; Georges Couthon, Saint-Just and René-François Dumas, ex-president of the Revolutionary Tribunal.

Why Robespierre failed to order his supporters to attack the convention sources as he had in the past, and then tried to kill himself, is a topic of speculation.

== Reaction ==
The events of 9 Thermidor proved a watershed in the revolutionary process. The Thermidorian regime that followed proved to be an unpopular one, facing many rebellions after its execution of Robespierre and his allies, along with 70 members of the Paris Commune, the largest mass execution to have ever taken place in Paris. This led to a very fragile situation in France.

The hostility toward Robespierre did not vanish with his execution. Instead, the people decided to blame those who were involved with Robespierre in any way, namely the many members of the Jacobin Club, their supporters, and individuals suspected of being past revolutionaries. The massacre of these groups became known as the White Terror, and was partially carried out by the Muscadin, a group of dandyish street fighters organized by the new government.

Often, members of these targeted groups were the victims of prison massacres or put on trial without due process, which were overall similar conditions to those provided to the counter-revolutionaries during the Reign of Terror. At the same time, its economic policies paved the way for rampant inflation. Ultimately, power devolved to the hands of the Directory, an executive of five men who assumed power in France in November 1795, in year IV of the French Revolutionary calendar.

The Thermidorian regime excluded the remaining Montagnards from power, even those who had joined in conspiring against Robespierre and Saint-Just. The White Terror of 1795 resulted in numerous imprisonments and several hundred executions, almost exclusively of people on the political left. These numbers, while significant, were considerably smaller than those associated with the previous Reign of Terror, which killed over 40,000. Many executions took place without a trial.

On July 29 the victors of the 9th Thermidor condemned seventy members of the Paris Commune to death; thereafter the Commune was subject to the convention. As part of the reorganization of French politics, practitioners of the terror were called to defend their records; some such as Tallien, Barras, Fouché and Louis-Marie Stanislas Fréron rejoined the leadership. Others such as Jacques-Nicolas Billaud-Varenne, Collot d'Herbois, Barère and Vadier were sentenced to exile in South America, though the latter two managed to evade arrest. Many Jacobin clubs were closed. Freedom of worship was extended first to the Vendée and later to all France. On 24 December 1794, the Maximum (controls on prices and wages) was abolished. The government exacerbated this inflationary move by issuing more assignats. In April and May 1795, protests and riots in support of the radicals broke out culminating in an invasion of the convention by an insurrectionist mob on 20 May. On 22 May the Convention struck back, having troops under Pichegru surround the Faubourg St-Antoine and force the capitulation of the armed rebels. In May and June 1795, a "White Terror" raged in which Jacobins were victims and the judges were bourgeois "moderates". Throughout France the events of the September Massacres were repeated; however this time the victims were imprisoned officials of the Terror. In Paris, Royalist sentiments were openly tolerated.

Meanwhile, French armies overran the Netherlands and established the Batavian Republic, occupied the left bank of the Rhine and forced Spain, Prussia and several German States to sue for peace, enhancing the prestige of the convention. A new constitution called the Constitution of the Year III was drawn up on 22 August 1795, which eased back some of the democratic elements of the constitution of 1793, establishing an electoral college for the election of officials, a bicameral legislature and other provisions designed to protect the current holders of power. On 5 October (13 Vendémiaire), a revolt led by Royalists challenged the convention. It was put down by troops led by general Napoleon Bonaparte with "a whiff of grapeshot". On 25 October the Convention declared itself dissolved and was replaced by the Directory on 2 November 1795.

== Other uses of the term ==
For historians of revolutionary movements, the term Thermidor has come to mean the phase in some revolutions when power slips from the hands of the original revolutionary leadership and a radical regime is replaced by a more conservative regime, sometimes to the point where the political pendulum may swing back towards something resembling a pre-revolutionary state.

Leon Trotsky in his book The Revolution Betrayed, alleged that the rise of Joseph Stalin to power was a Soviet Thermidor for 'not restoring capitalism', yet still being a 'counterrevolutionary regression' within the regime of the USSR, as Thermidor did not restore a monarchy, etc. Marxist-Leninists and Stalinists have periodically argued that Nikita Khruschev's rise to power and the implementation of De-Stalinization as the Soviet Union's Thermidor. A CIA document considered Khruschev's "On the Cult of Personality and Its Consequences" may have 'marked the "Thermidor" of the Russian Revolution'.
