= Antoine Quentin Fouquier-Tinville =

French lawyer and public prosecutor

Antoine Quentin Fouquier de Tinville
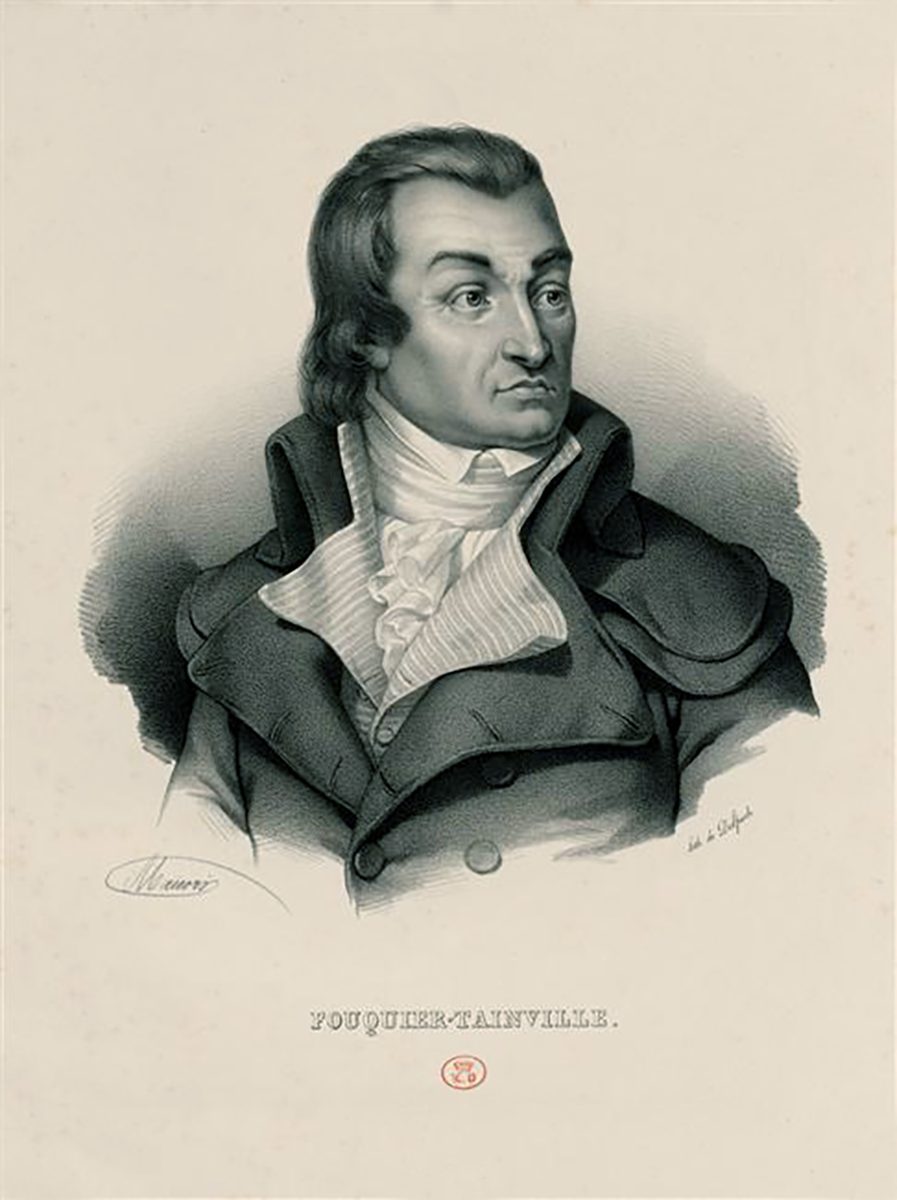
- Antoine Fouquier-Tinville during the Reign of Terror
- Born: 10 June 1746; Herouël, Aisne
- Died: 7 May 1795 (aged 48); Paris, France
- Cause of death: Guillotine
- Occupation: Lawyer

Antoine Quentin Fouquier de Tinville (French pronunciation: [ɑ̃twan kɑ̃tɛ̃ fukje tɛ̃vil], 10 June 1746 – 7 May 1795), also called Fouquier-Tinville and nicknamed posthumously the Provider of the Guillotine was a French lawyer and accusateur public (public prosecutor) of the Revolutionary Tribunal during the French Revolution and Reign of Terror.

From March 1793 he served as the public prosecutor in Paris, demanding the execution of numerous accused individuals, including such famous persons as Marie-Antoinette, Danton and Robespierre. He oversaw the sentencing of over two thousand people to the guillotine. In April 1794, it was decreed to centralise the investigation of court records and to bring all the political suspects in France to the Revolutionary Tribunal to Paris. Following the events of 10 Thermidor, he was arrested in early August.

He was tried by the Revolutionary Tribunal as one of the major figures responsible for the excesses and injustices that marked the period of the Reign of Terror. During his trial, he defended himself by stating, "It is not I who ought to be facing the tribunal, but the chiefs whose orders I have executed. I had only acted in the spirit of the laws passed by a Convention invested with all powers." Generally, his defense involved shifting the blame for the executions onto the Committee of Public Safety, especially on Maximilien de Robespierre.

Despite this defense, he was sentenced to death, alongside the judges and some jurors of the Revolutionary Tribunal, among other charges, for abusing his authority and neglecting proper legal procedures during trials. He was guillotined in Paris on 7 May 1795, and became the last individual to be executed by the Revolutionary Tribunal before its abolition.

His precise role in the Reign of Terror is still a subject of debate; modern historians suggest that it is more valuable to view his role as part of a group of officials and various terrorist actors rather than solely as the sole instigator of the Judicial Terror.

== Biography ==
=== Origins ===
The Fouquier de Tinville family, now known as Fouquier d'Hérouel, descends from an old bourgeois family from the vicinity of Saint-Quentin, in the present-day department of Aisne. In the 18th century, Éloy Fouquier de Tinville, lord of Tinville, Hérouel, Auroir, and Foreste, was a farmer and a royal officer in Péronne.

=== Early career ===
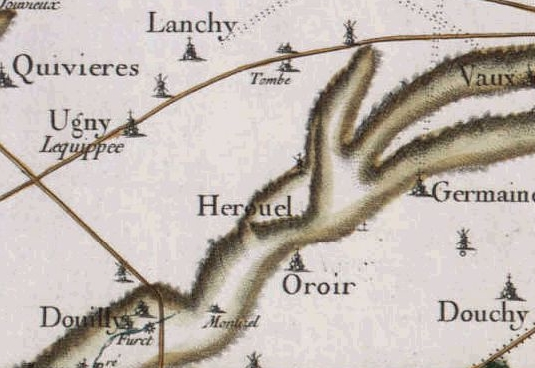
Hérouel

Antoine Fouquier de Tinville was born in Hérouel on 10 June 1746, and was baptized two days later (which often leads to confusion regarding his birthdate). He was the second of five siblings. His father, Éloy Fouquier de Tinville, a farmer and lord of Hérouel, gave him the name of the land of Tinville, while the name Hérouel went to his older brother, Pierre-Éloy. The two younger brothers received the names Foreste and Vauvillé. His mother, Marie-Louise Martine, came from a prosperous family. For six years he studied law in Noyon and in 1774 purchased a position as prosecutor or procureur attached to the Châtelet in Paris, which was an exceptional royal jurisdiction tasked with targeting, among other things, revolutionaries. He sold his office in 1781 to pay off his debts and became a clerk under the lieutenant-general of police. In 1775 Fouquier-Tinville married Geneviève-Dorothée Saugnier, his cousin, with whom he would have five children (two twins). He was widowed seven years later. Four months after his wife's death, he remarried Henriette Jeanne Gérard d'Arcourt, with whom he would spend the rest of his life. They had three children together.

In early 1791, freedom of defence became the standard; any citizen was allowed to defend another. From the beginning, the authorities were concerned about the experiment's future. Derasse suggests it was a "collective suicide" by the lawyers in the Assembly. In criminal cases, the expansion of the right gave priority to the spoken word.

Little is known of the part he played at the outbreak of the Revolution. According to himself, he was part of the National Guard at its formation. He was active in the political committee of his section in 1789. In September 1791, former advocates lost their title, their distinctive form of dress, their status, and their profession orders and adapted their practices to the new political and legal situation. Also, Fouquier called himself "homme de loi". In Summer 1792, he supported the sans-culottes movement. On 25 August, backed by his cousin Camille Desmoulins, and after Robespierre refused the position, Fouquier de Tinville became for three months the foreman of a jury established to pass verdicts on the crimes of enemies of the people arrested after the Insurrection of 10 August 1792.

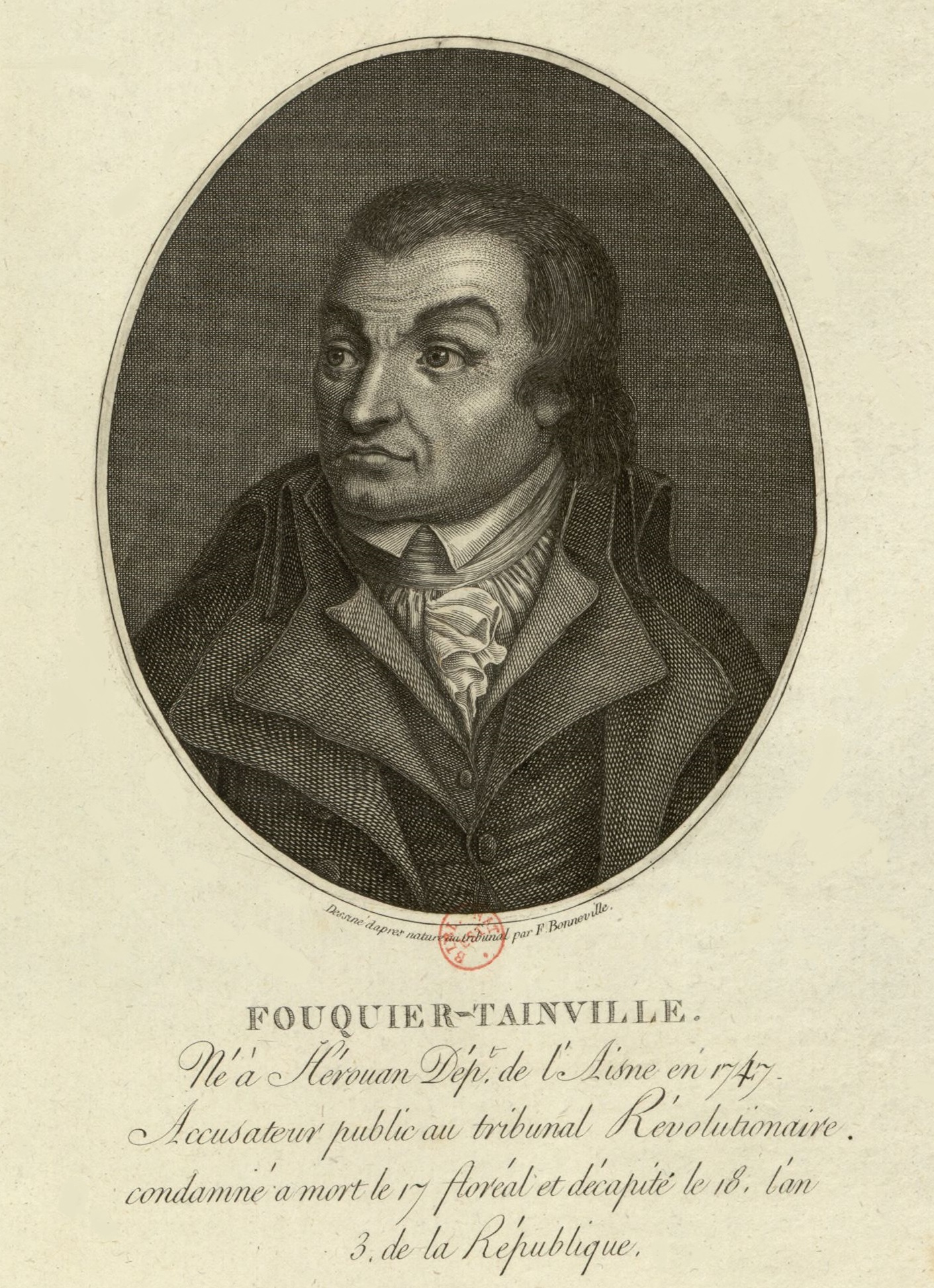
Antoine Fouquier-Tinville, engraving by François Bonneville, Paris, BnF (National Library of France), Department of Prints and Photography, 1796.

After Robespierre refused, Fouquier-Tinville was appointed as president. The Paris commune made the decision to permanently install the guillotine.

=== Public accuser ===
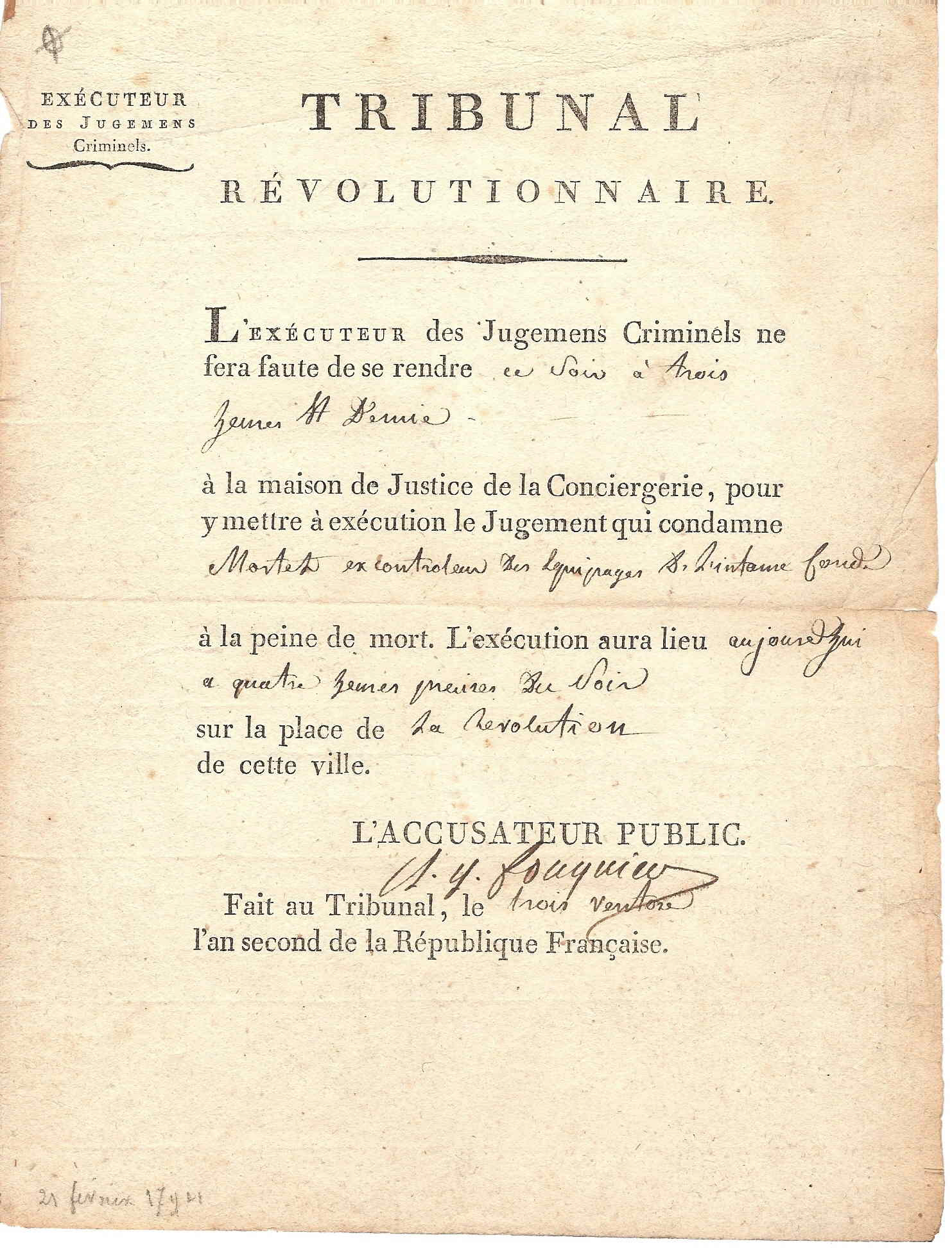
Act of death sentence signed by Fouquier-Tinville, public accuser to the committee of public safety in the Revolutionary Tribunal.

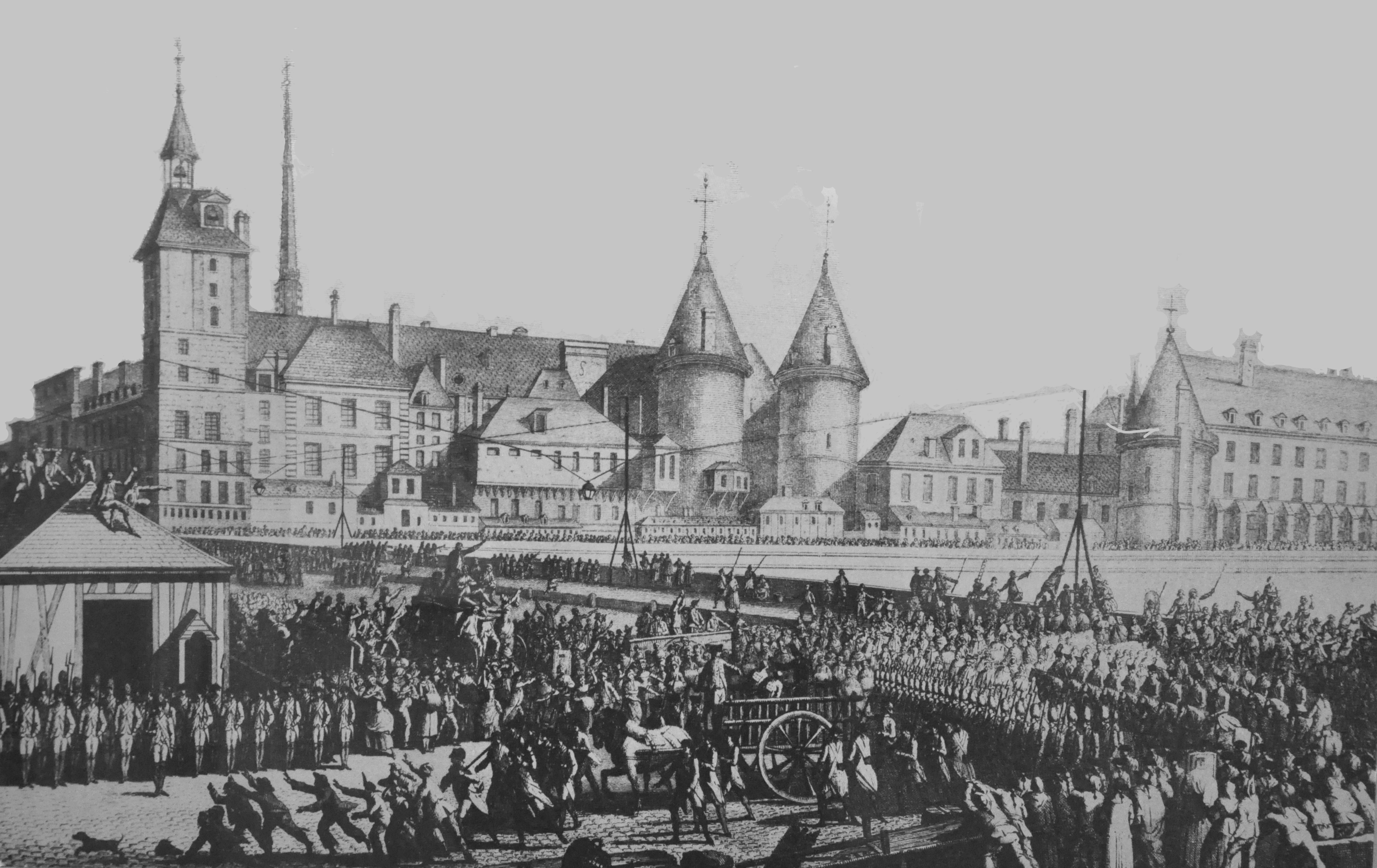
Conciergerie in 1790; the medieval towers still exist.

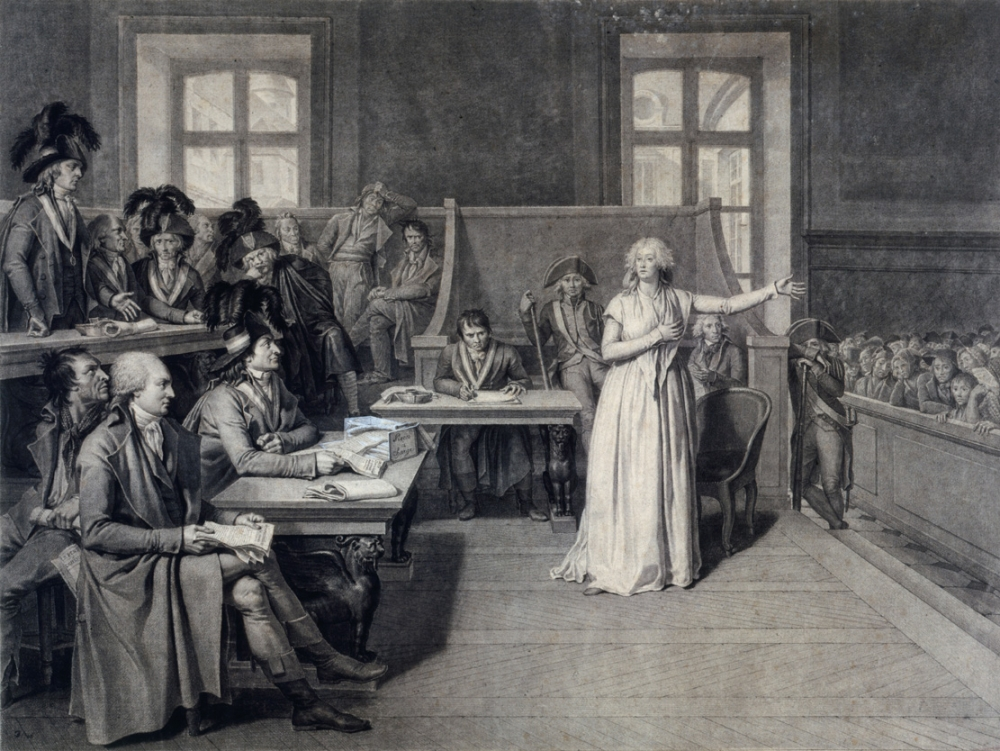
Procès de Marie-Antoinette le 15 octobre 1793

When the Revolutionary Tribunal of Paris was created by the National Convention on 10 March 1793, and Fauré refused the position, Fouquier was appointed on 15 March as public accuser, an office that he filled from the end of March until 1 August 1794. Documents would be sent by the Committee of General Security to the public accuser, who was to use them to draw up their indictment. Fouquier-Tinville was described by peers as a hardworking and conscientious man, and was also known for his radicalism. His zeal in prosecution earned him the nickname "Purveyor to the Guillotine." On 29 July he accused Jacques-Bernard-Marie Montané, president of the tribunal, of being insufficiently radical. On 17 September the Law of Suspects was introduced. On 26 September 1793 Martial Herman was appointed as president and René-François Dumas as vice president; Coffinhal and Joachim Vilate were each appointed as one of the judges and jurors, and Adrien Nicolas Gobeau as substitute of the public accuser.

Fouquier lived at Rue Saint-Honoré but moved to Place Dauphine and then to fr:Quai de l'Horloge both on Île de la Cité. An apartment between the towers of the Conciergerie was the home of Fouquier-Tinville. He lived there with his wife and twins while conducting the trials in the courtroom. His activity in the Conciergerie and the Palace of Justice earned him the reputation of one of the most sinister figures of the Revolution. His office as public accuser arguably reflected a need to display the appearance of legality during what was essentially political command, more than a need to establish actual guilt.

On 29 October 1793, Fouquier-Tinville sent a letter to the National Convention, which was later used during his trial. In the letter, he wrote:

We are arrested by the formalities prescribed by the law. [...] Moreover, one wonders, why witnesses? The Convention, all of France, accuse those whose trial is being conducted; the evidence of their crimes is evident; everyone in their hearts is convinced that they are guilty; the tribunal can do nothing on its own, it is obliged to follow the law; it is up to the Convention to remove all the formalities that hinder its progress.

In early April of 1794, Fouquier-Tinville asked the tribunal to order the Indulgents who "confused the hearing" and insulted "National Justice" to the guillotine, and claimed that the Dantonists were not serving the people and were "false patriots", who had preferred personal and foreign interests to the welfare of the nation. He did not align with any specific political movement, keeping his distance from factions such as the Jacobins, and he did not maintain any particular relationships with leaders from the Montagnards, such as Maximilien Robespierre, as reported by Antoine Boulant.

On 21 May 1794 the government decided that the Terror would be centralised, with almost all the tribunals in the provinces closed and all the trials held in Paris.

== Grande Terreur ==
On 10 June, Georges Couthon introduced the Law of 22 Prairial. Legal defense was sacrificed by banning any assistance for defendants brought before the revolutionary tribunal. "If this law passes," cried a deputy, "all we have to do is to blow our brains out." Fouquier, who feared to be incapable to deal with the number of trials, sent him a letter, but Robespierre did not reply. The tribunal was given the power to accuse and condemn any who were perceived to be an enemy of the revolution. The courtroom was renovated to allow more people to be sentenced simultaneously. It proposed to erect a guillotine inside the courtroom, but it was moved to the Faubourg Saint-Antoine in order to stand out less. According to François Furet, the prisons were overpopulated; they housed over 8,000 "suspects" at the beginning of Thermidor year II. The number of death sentences doubled. Within three days, 156 people were sent in batches to the guillotine; all the members of the Parlement of Toulouse were executed. More than 2,400 people were convicted by the "tribunal révolutionaire" accused of conspiring against liberty. The commune had to solve serious problems in the cemeteries because of the smell. Two new mass graves were dug in mid-July at Picpus Cemetery in the impermeable ground.

One of the last groups he prosecuted included seven nuns, aged 32 to 66, of the former convent of Carmelites living in Paris, plus an eighth nun from the Convent of the Visitation,

. . .who were charged with consorting together and scheming to trouble the State by provoking civil war with their fanaticism...Instead of living at peace within the bosom of the Republic, which had provided for their subsistence, and instead of obeying the laws, adopted the idea of residing together in this same house...and of making this house a refuge for refractory priests and counter-revolutionary fanatics, with whom they plotted against the Revolution and against the eternal principles of liberty and equality which are its basis.

Apparently, the nuns, whom he called criminal assassins, were corrupted by the ex-Jesuit Rousseau de Roseicquet, who led them in a conspiracy to poison minds and subvert the Republic. When the judge read this piece of Fouquier-Tinville's prose, he condemned them to be deported, as well as all those who had given them refuge.

=== Downfall ===
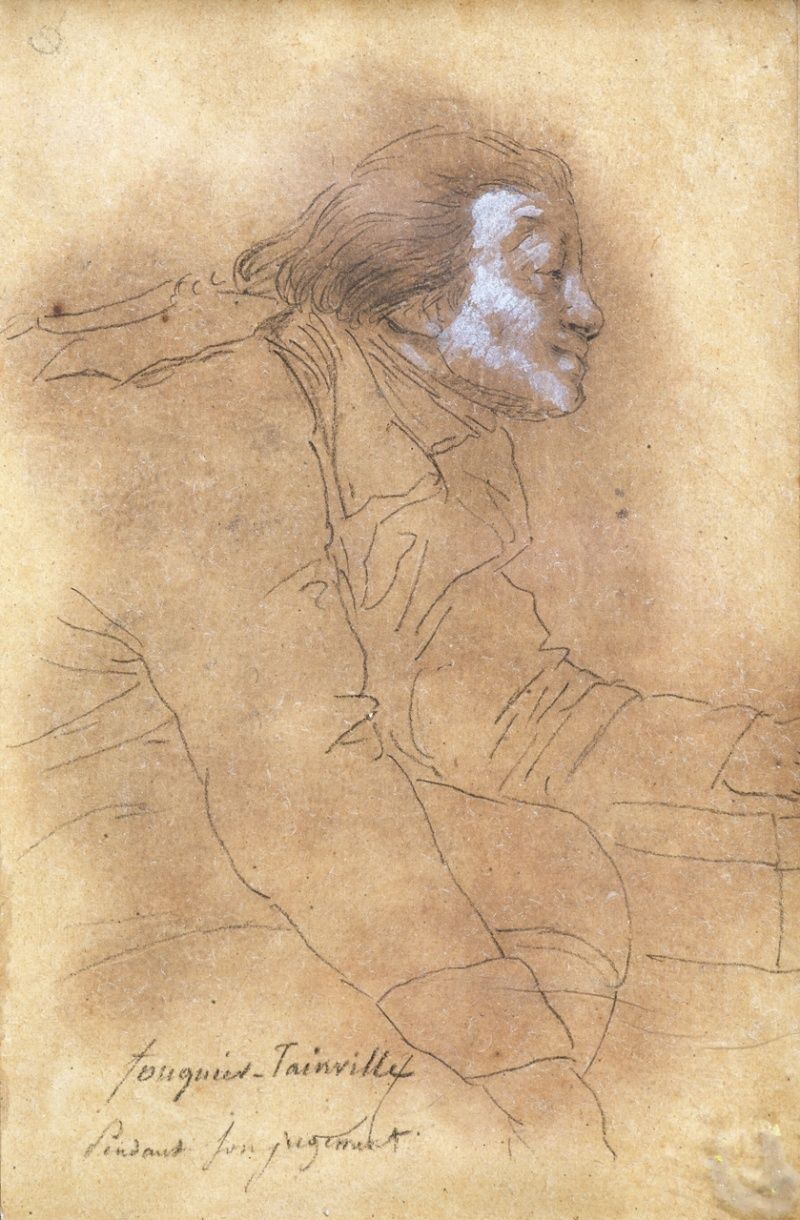
Fouquier Tinville par Vivant Denon

On 26–27 June, Robespierre demanded that Fouquier-Tinville, who had become involved in the trial of Catherine Théot, be replaced because he was considered too closely associated with the Committee of General Security.

During the events of 9 Thermidor, Fouquier-Tinville remained at his post. When the presiding judge Dumas was arrested during a session of the Revolutionary Tribunal by decree of the Convention, Fouquier-Tinville insisted that "justice take its course" and ordered the proceedings to continue. That evening, while dining with Coffinhal, he learned of the arrest of Robespierre, Couthon, Saint-Just and their associates. Invited to join the insurgents at the Hôtel de Ville, he refused, declaring that he recognised only the authority of the Convention. That night, he reported to the Committee of Public Safety and, after learning of the defeat of the Commune, congratulated the Convention on its victory.

On the morning of 10 Thermidor (28 July 1794), Fouquier-Tinville appeared before the Convention to assure it of the Tribunal's loyalty. When verifying the identity of the prisoners, Fouquier-Tinville had to solve a legal problem, as 13 of them were members of the insurrectionary Commune. Around 2 a.m., Robespierre and 21 "Robespierrists" were accused of counter-revolution and condemned to death by the rules of the law of 22 Prairial.

Although Fouquier-Tinville was initially retained as public prosecutor by the new government, as confirmed by Barère before the Convention, his position soon became untenable. On 14 Thermidor, Fréron denounced him as an accomplice of the Terror and demanded his arrest. Imprisoned on 1 August 1794, he argued that he had merely executed the laws and decrees enacted by the Convention and the Committee of Public Safety. On 21 Thermidor, Year II (8 August 1794), he was allowed to present his defence before the National Convention. His arguments failed to persuade the deputies, who decided that he, together with several judges and jurors of the Revolutionary Tribunal, should stand trial for his role during the Terror:

It is not I who ought to be facing the tribunal, but the chiefs whose orders I have executed. I had only acted in the spirit of the laws passed by a Convention invested with all powers. Through the absence of its members [on trial], I find myself the head of a [political] conspiracy I have never been aware of. Here I am facing slander, [facing] a people always eager to find others responsible.

=== Trial ===
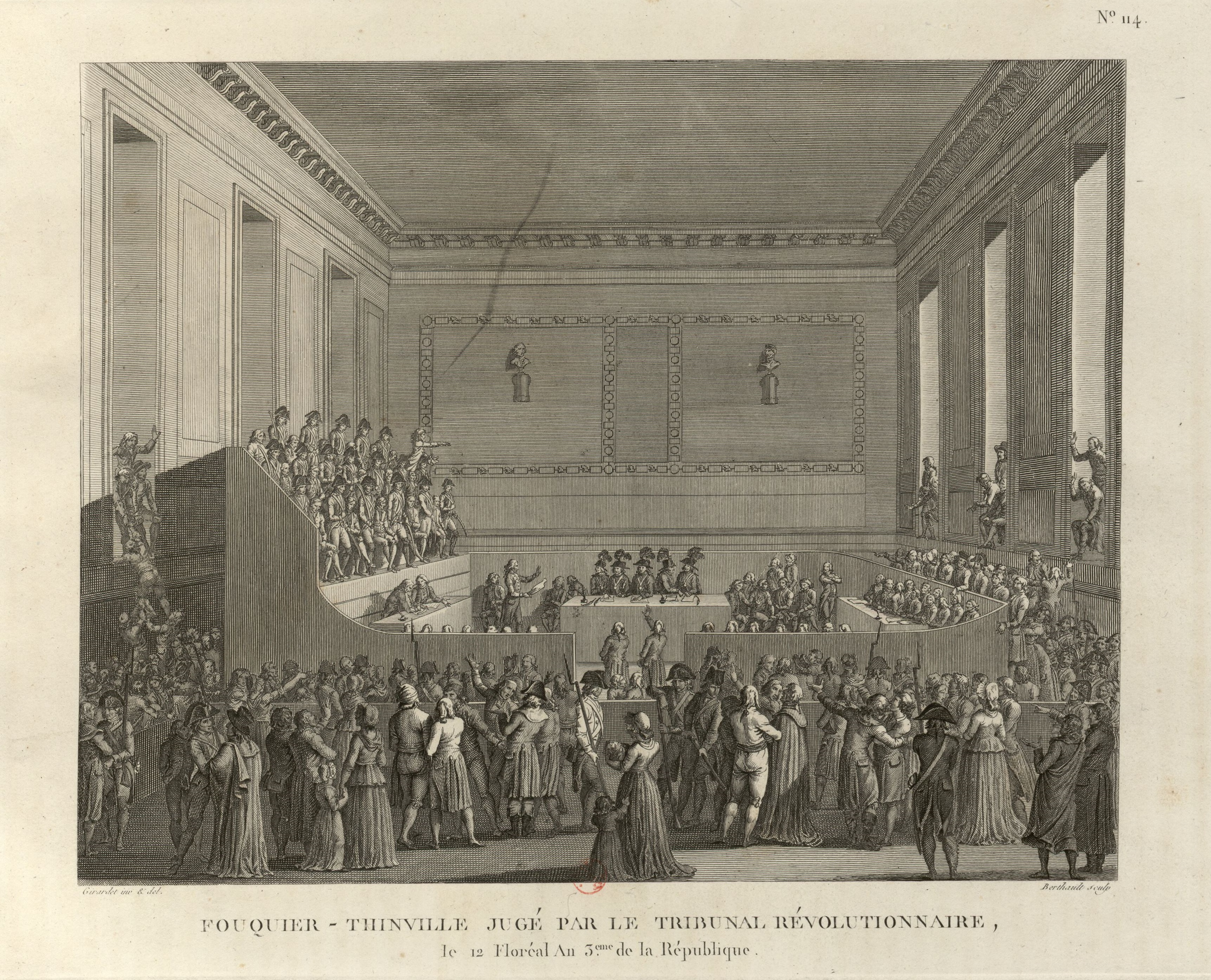
Fouquier-Thinville trial

Tallien, one of the leaders of the Thermidorians and a central deputy in the fall of Robespierre, opposed subjecting him to thorough questioning. This is generally interpreted as a maneuver aimed at preventing Fouquier-Tinville from providing lists of deputies who may have been complicit in his judicial work, including Tallien himself. Fouquier defended his innocence vehemently. In a letter to his wife and children dated 12 November 1794, in which he enclosed a lock of hair, he maintained his innocence, claimed to be the victim of slander, and stated that he was "sacrificed to public opinion."

His trial ensued, lasting forty-one days, the longest of the French Revolution. From the 9th Germinal, Year III (29 March 1795), to the 12th Floréal (1 May), a total of 419 witnesses were called, including 223 for the defense and 196 for the prosecution. Among the witnesses for the prosecution was, for instance, the Paris clerk, who accused him of shedding the blood of innocents, especially Danton. Also among the prosecution witnesses was the bailiff Lucien Dupré, who spoke of his "relentlessness." Among the witnesses for the defense was the owner of the Palais de Justice tavern, who claimed that Fouquier-Tinville had complained to her about the number of executions, and the lawyer Bernard Malarme, who asserted that he had released many patriots.

Generally, he defended himself by assigning responsibility for the executions of the Revolutionary Tribunal to the Committee of Public Safety, especially Maximilien de Robespierre. According to his testimony, he claimed to have met with Robespierre privately every evening to decide on the executions for the following day. This did not convince his prosecutors and he was sentenced to death.

=== Death ===
He was guillotined on 7 May 1795, together with 15 former functionaries of the Revolutionary Tribunal, who were sentenced as his accomplices. These are his final words, which he wrote before his execution:

I have nothing to reproach myself with; I have always complied with the laws, I have never been a creature of Robespierre or Saint-Just; on the contrary, I have been on the verge of being arrested four times. I die for my country and without reproach. I am satisfied: later, my innocence will be recognized.

== Analysis ==
Long considered the primary instigator of the judicial Terror, his role is now nuanced, with the most recent research including him in a broader process of judicial Terror with other actors. Fouquier-Tinville appears to have generally followed the instructions of Maximilien Robespierre but especially those of the Committee of Public Safety and the Committee of General Security during the period of the Terror. However, in some cases, he is said to have shown a desire for independence from political power, especially by granting significant rights to certain defendants.

== Posterity ==
- Literature : Alexandre Dumas and Anatole France wrote about him and included him in their historical novels. He was quoted in an article and in Illusions perdues of Honoré de Balzac. He is also to be found in Les Mémoires d'outre-tombe of Chateaubriand.
- Cinema: Fouquier was played by Roger Planchon in Andrzej Wajda's film Danton (1983). He appears as a character in the opera Andrea Chenier by Umberto Giordano.
- Video game : Tinville appears in the game We. The Revolution where he aids the player as a prosecutor for the Revolutionary Tribunal during the Reign of Terror.

== Notable victims ==
- Charlotte Corday
- Adam Philippe, Comte de Custine and his son,
- Marie Antoinette
- Girondist

- Jacques Pierre Brissot and 21 Girondins
- Madame Roland

- Olympe de Gouges
- Antoine Lavoisier
- Mme du Barry
- Antoine Barnave
- Armand Louis de Gontaut, duc de Lauzun, later duc de Biron
- Jacques Hébert as well as the leaders of the "armées révolutionnaires" were denounced by the Revolutionary Tribunal as accomplices of Hébert.
- Dantonists.

- George Danton
- Marie Jean Hérault de Séchelles
- Pierre Philippeaux
- Camille and Lucile Desmoulins

- Malesherbes, a lawyer who had defended the king and the deputés Isaac René Guy le Chapelier and Jacques Guillaume Thouret, four times elected president of the Constituent Assembly were taken to the scaffold.
- Cécile Renault
- Élisabeth of France
- Alexandre de Beauharnais
- André Chénier
- Martyrs of Compiègne
- Princess of Monaco
- Maximilien Robespierre and twenty-one of his associates were executed on 10 Thermidor Year II (28 July 1794). Further executions of members of the Paris Commune followed over the next two days. Soon afterwards, the Revolutionary Tribunal was suspended and replaced by a temporary commission. Although Fouquier-Tinville had initially remained in office, he was arrested on 14 Thermidor and became one of the principal targets of the Thermidorian reaction.

== Sources ==
- Chisholm, Hugh, ed. (1911). "Fouquier-Tinville, Antoine Quentin" . Encyclopædia Britannica. Vol. 10 (11th ed.). Cambridge University Press. p. 751. In turn, it cites as references:
  - Mémoire pour A. Q. Fouquier ex-accusateur public près le tribunal révolutionnaire, etc. (Paris, 1794)
  - M. Domenget, Fouquier-Tinville et le tribunal révolutionnaire (Paris, 1878)
  - Georges Lecocq, Notes et documents sur Fouquier-Tinville (Paris, 1885)
  - Jean Maurice Tourneux, Bibliographie de l'histoire de Paris pendant la Révolution Française, vol. i. Nos. 4445-4454 (1890), an ennumeration of the documents relating to Fouquier-Tinville's trial
  - Henri Wallon, Histoire du tribunal révolutionnaire de Paris (1880–1882)
- Furet, François; Ozouf, Mona, eds. (1989). A Critical Dictionary of the French Revolution. Translated by Arthur Goldhammer. Belknap Press of Harvard University Press. ISBN 978-0-674-17728-4.
- Israel, Jonathan (2014). Revolutionary Ideas: An Intellectual History of the French Revolution from The Rights of Man to Robespierre. Princeton University Press. ISBN 978-1400849994.

== Bibliography ==
- Procès de Fouquier-Tinville. A Paris: Chez Maret, 1795
- Procès de Fouquier Tinville. Paris: De l'imprimerie du Bulletin républicaine, 1795
- Réponse d'Antoine-Quentin Fouquier, ex-accusateur-public près le Tribunal révolutionnaire de Paris, aux différens chefs d'accusation portés en l'acte à lui notifié, le 26 frimaire: a la défense générale de Billaud-Varennes, Collot-d'Herbois, Barrère et Vadier, anciens membres des comités de gouvernement, et a celle particulière de Billaud, et encore aux faits avancés par quelques-uns d'eux, dans les séances de la Convention des 12 et 13 fructidor. Paris, Impr. de Marchant, 1795
- Réquisitoires de Fouquier-Tinville, ed. Hector Fleischmann, 1911
- Dunoyer, Alphonse J. The Public Prosecutor of the Terror: Antoine Quentin Fouquier-Tinville. Translated by A. W. Evans. New York: G. P. Putnam's Sons, 1913.
- Dulac, H. G. Le glaive vengeur de la République française une et indivisible, ou Galerie révolutionnaire.
