= René-François Dumas =

French politician and lawyer (1753 – 1794)

René-François Dumas (14 December 1753 – 28 July 1794) was a revolutionary French lawyer and politician, regarded as an ally of Maximilien Robespierre. He was guillotined along with Robespierre in Paris.

== Biography ==
Dumas was born in Jussey, in the bailiwick of Amont (now in Haute-Saône) and was well educated. In June 1790 Dumas founded a popular society in Lons-le-Saunier and became a member of the city council. In 1791 he was the mayor of Lons-le-Saunier. He became member of the "Society of the Friends of the Constitution", where he played a leading role, even occupying the presidency. On 26 September 1793, Dumas was appointed vice-president of the Revolutionary Tribunal and involved in the trial of Madame Elisabeth, Madame Roland, Marie-Antoinette and Madame du Barry.

On 8 April 1794, three days after the execution of Georges Danton and Camille Desmoulins, Dumas became the president of the court, taking over from Martial Joseph Armand Herman who was appointed Foreign minister. In this quality, with Antoine Quentin Fouquier-Tinville as the public prosecutor, he headed several major political trials in which defendants were sentenced to death. The trial of the "first conspiracy of the prisons" on 13 April considered in particular the general Arthur Dillon, the archbishop constitutional of Paris Jean-Baptiste Gobel, procureur syndic of the Commune of Paris Pierre Gaspard Chaumette, and the widows Marie Marguerite Françoise Hébert and Lucile Desmoulins.

In June the tribunal put in force the Law of 22 Prairial. According to Adolphe Thiers their goal was to keep the prisons empty. According to Fouquier-Tinville, Dumas and Coffinhal, the vice-president of the tribunal, went each morning to see Robespierre and did what he told them to do, not what the Committee of Public Safety had decided. His last victim was the Princess of Monaco on 28 July. At 4 pm a charge of 45 convicts was sent to the guillotine on the Place de la Nation but was stopped on the way in the Faubourg Saint-Antoine. Francois Hanriot, general of the Parisian National Guard, accompanied the procession.

In the evening of 27 July, Dumas joined the insurrectionary Commune of Paris in support of Maximilien Robespierre, Louis Antoine de Saint-Just, Georges Couthon, Philippe-François-Joseph Le Bas and Augustin Robespierre. In the early morning of 28 July, the group was arrested at the Hôtel de Ville and taken to the Tuileries Palace, where the Convention was sitting. After medical attention had been provided to the wounded prisoners, they were transferred to the Conciergerie. In the early afternoon, the Revolutionary Tribunal verified their identities as persons declared hors la loi. Without a trial the condemned were sent to the guillotine in the late afternoon. For the occasion, the guillotine had been moved from the Place du Trône-Renversé back to the Place de la Révolution, where Robespierre and his associates were executed before a large crowd Although Dumas was executed with the other Robespierrists, Fouquier-Tinville remained in office for several days and was arrested only on 14 Thermidor.
