= Martial Herman =

French lawyer and judge (1759–1795)

Martial Joseph Armand Herman
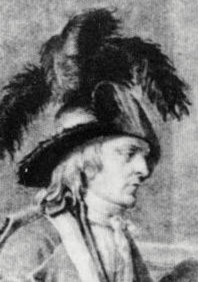
- Born: 29 August 1759; Saint-Pol-sur-Ternoise, Pas-de-Calais, Kingdom of France
- Died: 7 May 1795 (aged 35); Paris, French Repulic
- Cause of death: Execution by guillotine
- Occupation: Lawyer

Signature
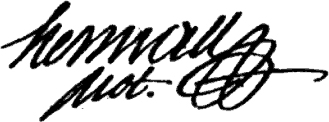

Martial Joseph Armand Herman (29 August 1759 – 7 May 1795) was a French lawyer and a chief judge during the Reign of Terror. His most famous cases were against Marie Antoinette and Georges Danton. As the commissioner of police, he dealt with the Luxembourg prison conspiracies, shortly before the Jacobin regime fell.

== Life ==
Martial was born in a family of lawyers. On 26 July 1783, he was admitted to the bar, and in 1786 he bought the post of substitute attorney general of the provincial Estates of Artois, which seated in Arras. In 1790, he founded the local club of Jacobins together with his younger brother. In 1791, he was elected criminal court judge in the Pas-de-Calais. In 1792, he married a lower-class woman from Willerval, who could not read; the couple had one child. On 28 August 1793, on instigation of Robespierre he replaced Jacques-Bernard-Marie Montané as president of the Revolutionary Tribunal. He presided at the trial of Marie-Antoinette, and the Girondins in October, Philippe Égalité, Madame Roland, and Jean Sylvain Bailly in November, and Jacques Hébert, Georges Danton and Camille Desmoulins in March/April 1794. On the proposal of Lazare Carnot, Herman set up twelve commissions created by the executive decree of 12 Germinal (1 April). They replaced the six ministries and their offices, of which Herman chaired the first (general administration and courts). René-François Dumas succeeded Herman when Herman was appointed commissioner of civil administration, police and courts after Jules-François Paré. Herman lived during this time at 19 Place Vendôme.

Three days after 9 Thermidor (30 July 1794), Herman was arrested and spent ten months in prison. In his first hours of captivity, Herman drafted a supporting memoir. He wrote that he always helped the wives and children of the detainees, etc. On 6 May 1795, after receiving the verdict sentencing him to death - with a majority of one vote - he flung his hat out of the window in a moment of rage. It was Scellier who threw a pamphlet at the presiding judge Liger-Verdigny. He was guillotined on the Place de Grève, at about eleven o'clock in the morning, together with Fouquier-Tinville the public prosecutor; Scellier (vice chairman of the Revolutionary Court), Lanne (judge) and Herman's assistant; Foucault (judge); Garnier-Launay (judge); Renaudin (juror); Leroy (juror), Vilate (juror); Prieur (juror), Chatelet (juror), Girard (juror); Boyaval; Trey; Verney, and Dupaumier.

== Sources ==
- Mémoire Justificatif Pour Le Citoyen Herman - Thermidor An II (1794)
- Boutboul, Julien Un rouage du Gouvernement révolutionnaire : la Commission des administrations civiles, police et tribunaux (germinal an II-brumaire an IV), vol. II (Paris, 2004)
- Landeux, Philippe Le tribunal révolutionnaire de Paris (1793-1795) (2017)

Political offices
| Preceded by Jean Marie Claude Alexandre Goujon | Minister of Foreign Affairs; 8 April 1794 – 20 April 1794 | Succeeded by Charles Delacroix |
| Preceded by Jules-François Paré | Minister of the Interior; 8 April 1794 – 20 April 1794 | Succeeded by Pierre Bénézech |
