= Renaudin =

Renaudin is a French surname. Notable people with the surname include:

- Cyprien Renaudin (1757–1836), French navy officer
- Jean François Renaudin (1750–1809), French Navy admiral
- Léopold Renaudin (1749–1795), French revolutionary

== See also ==
- French destroyer Renaudin
