= Joachim Vilate =

French priest

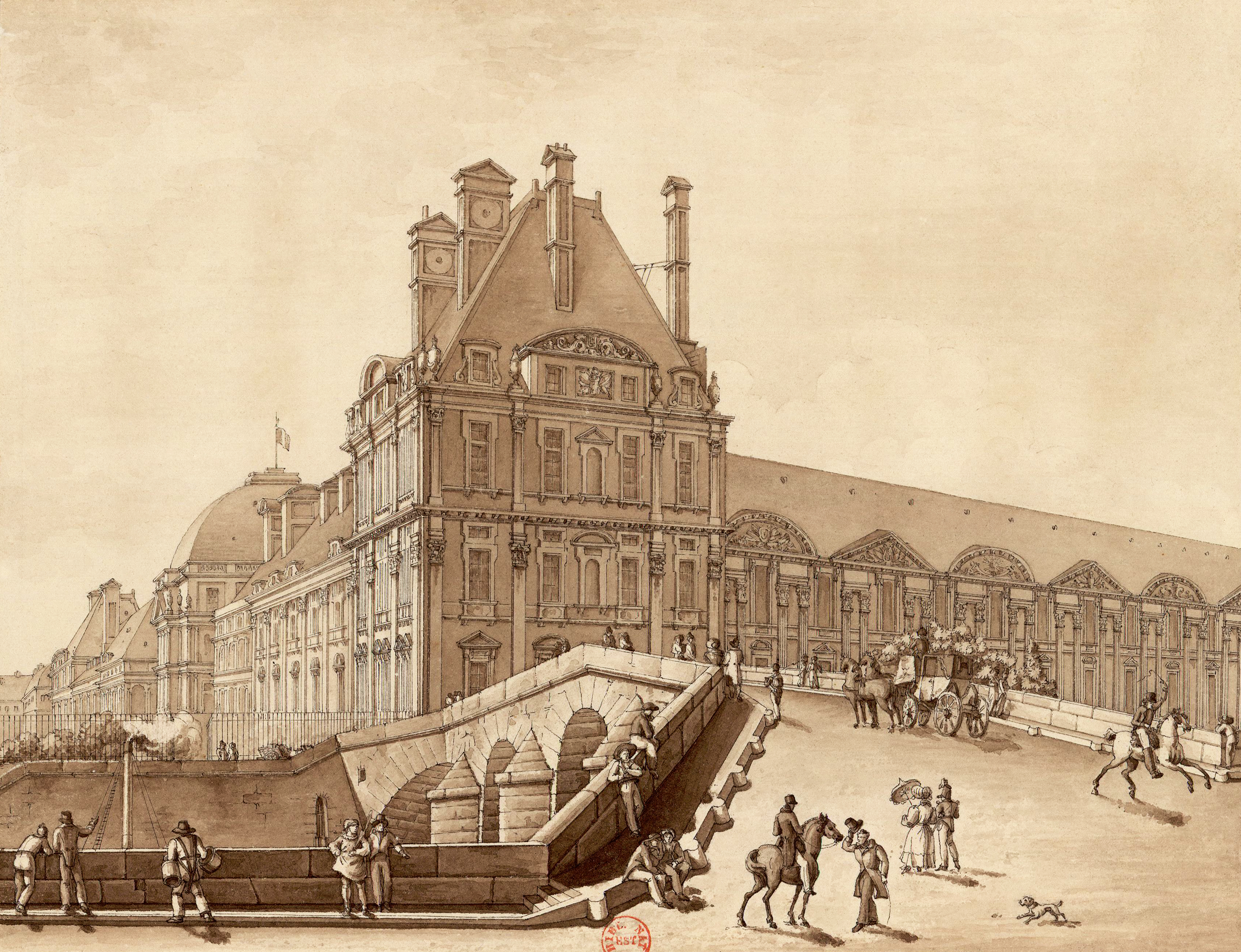
The Pavillon de Flore, the seat of the Committee of Public Safety and General Police Bureau. Also, Joachim Vilate, a dandy, lived there in an apartment. Drawing in brown ink (1814)

Joachim Vilate (9 October 1767 in Ahun, Creuse – 7 May 1795), also known as Sempronius-Gracchus Vilate, was a French revolutionary figure. The Committee of Public Safety appointed him as member of the jury (juror) of the Revolutionary Tribunal.

== Biography ==
An issue of a bourgeoise family of Haute-Marche, he was the son of François Vilate, a surgeon juror of Ahun, and Marie Decourteix (or de Courteix). He studied at Eymoutiers and later at University of Bourges, where he studied philosophy. After his father's death he attended a seminary at Limoges, and was named by the administrators of the second professor's department along with the city's royal college, in 1791, he was a rhetoric at Saint-Gaultier in Indre. In March 1792 he arrived in Paris to study medicine. He lived in Rue du Bac.

In September 1793 he was appointed as one of jurors. On 12 October 1793 when Hébert accused Marie-Antoinette during her trial of incest with her son, Vilate had dinner with Barère, Saint-Just and Robespierre. Discussing the matter, Robespierre broke his plate with his fork and called Hébert an "imbécile". According to Vilate Robespierre then had already two or three bodyguards.

In the morning of 8 June, before the Festival of the Supreme Being Vilate invited Robespierre for lunch.

Vilate was arrested on 20 July 1794 (3 Thermidor, year II) on orders of Billaud-Varenne for the crime of having invited Johann David Hermann, the piano-forte teacher of the royal family, to the sessions of the tribunal. He was released from La Force Prison on 9 Thermidor.

Vilate was the author of The Secret Causes of the Revolution of 9th and 10th Thermidor and its two sequels, published during the Thermidorian reaction, while he was in prison. He accused Barère, Billaud-Varenne and Robespierre of trying to decimate the convention. Exaggerating the numbers, raged against Robespierre keeping 300,000 people in prison and trying to guillotine two or three hundred people every day. Sentenced to death, he was guillotined, with fourteen other defendants on 18 Floreal, Year III (May 7, 1795), in the Place de Grève, Paris at about eleven o'clock in the morning.

== See also ==
- Martial Joseph Armand Herman
- Marie Joseph Emmanuel Lanne
- Léopold Renaudin
- Gabriel Toussaint Scellier
