= Jean-Baptiste Coffinhal =

French revolutionary (1762–1794)

Pierre-André Coffinhal-Dubail (French pronunciation: [pjɛʁ ɑ̃dʁe kɔfinal dybaj]), known as Jean-Baptiste Coffinhal (French pronunciation: [ʒɑ̃ batist kɔfinal]), (7 November 1762 in Vic-sur-Cère – 6 August 1794 in Paris (18 Thermidor Year II)) was a lawyer, French revolutionary, member of the General Council of the Paris commune and a judge of the Revolutionary Tribunal.

== Family ==
Pierre-André Coffinhal-Dubail was the youngest of the six sons of Annet-Joseph Coffinhal (Pailherols 22 September 1705 - Vic-sur-Cère 6 December 1767), a lawyer in the bailiwick of Vic-sur-Cère, and Françoise Dunoyer, who were married in Aurillac on 18 May 1745. He came from a long-established bourgeois family, which possessed wealth and authority already greater than that of the local nobility into which it was assimilating.

Two of his older brothers, Jean-Baptiste (Raulhac 1 April 1746 - Aurillac 13 June 1818) and Joseph (Vic-sur-Cère 12 April 1757 - 1 September 1841) studied law. Jean-Baptiste followed his father as lawyer in the bailiwick and bought a number of biens nationaux sold to the criminal court where his brother Joseph worked during the French Revolution. Joseph later worked at the Cour de cassation and was ennobled by Napoleon, taking the title Baron Dunoyer and becoming a State Councillor. In fact after the Revolution both Jean-Baptiste and Joseph secured permission to change their name to that of their mother in order to dissociate themselves from their brother.

Coffinhal himself began by studying medicine like his older brother Pierre but soon gave it up. He went to Paris, where he found a position as a clerk in a prosecutor's office.

== Revolutionary tribunal ==
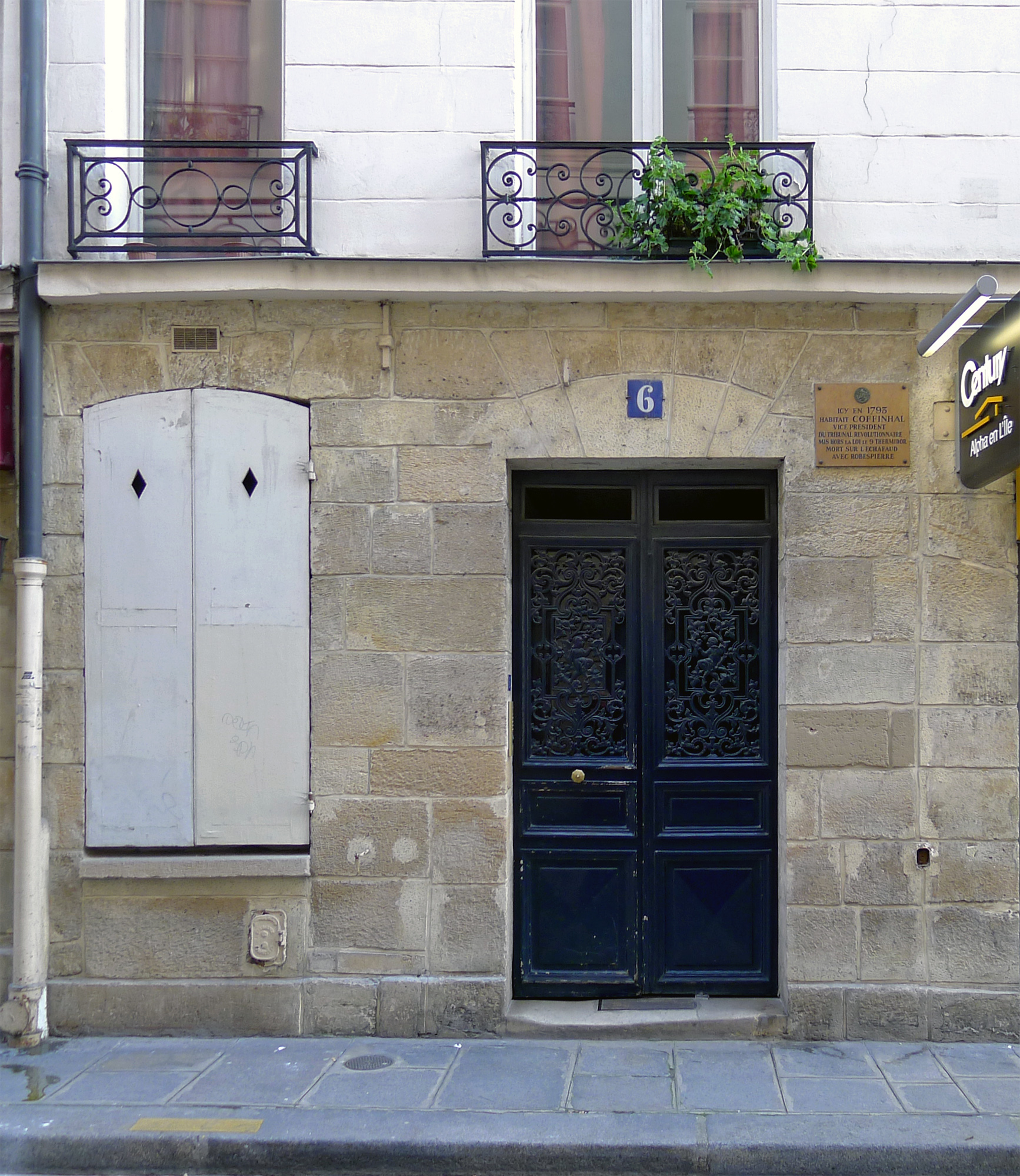
rue Le Regrattier 6, where Coffinhal lived in 1793 (plaque).

He was enthusiastic about the French Revolution and took an active part in the political life of the city. He was an elector for the Section de l'Île-Saint-Louis (renamed Section de la Fraternité in 1792) for the 1791 French legislative election and in the elections the following year for the Convention. He was then appointed police commissioner for this Section. A member of the Jacobin club, he took part in the storming of the Tuileries palace in August 1792 and became a judge in the special criminal court set up shortly afterward on 17 August. At some point he followed the minor fashion for adopting classical names (e.g. Gracchus Babeuf, Anacharsis Cloots) and took to calling himself Mucius Scaevola Coffinhal.

When the Revolutionary Tribunal was set up on 10 March 1793, he was named as one of its judges and thereby became a friend of Fouquier-Tinville. Politically close to Maximilien Robespierre, he behaved with a zeal and an intransigence that bred a deep hatred among his enemies, along with his tendency for misplaced witticisms.

A year after the Revolutionary Tribunal was established, Coffinhal presided at the trial of Jacques-René Hébert and the Hébertistes (March 1794), for which as well as directing the proceedings he was responsible for editing the official report. Produced in collaboration with three colleagues, his account bore little resemblance to the actual exchanges of the trial. In 1795, the discovery of various documents relating to the direction of trials over which he had presided proved that he had suppressed and altered much of the evidence, as his fellow-judge Féral had claimed in evidence on 9 Vendemiaire Year III (30 September 1794).

He also presided at the trial of Antoine Lavoisier and the Farmers General. It was during the course of this trial when he is said to have uttered the famous response to the appeal from Lavoisier's wife that he should be reprieved in order to pursue his scientific research: "La République n'a pas besoin de savants ni de chimistes; le cours de la justice ne peut être suspendu." ('The Republic has no need of scientists or chemists; the course of justice cannot be delayed.') (Note: Commenting on this quotation, Denis Duveen, an English expert on Lavoiser and a collector of his works, wrote that "it is pretty certain that it was never uttered". For Duveen's evidence, see the following: Duveen, Denis I. (February 1954). "Antoine Laurent Lavoisier and the French Revolution". Journal of Chemical Education. 31 (2): 60–65. Bibcode:1954JChEd..31...60D. doi:10.1021/ed031p60..) (Note: The French 'n'a pas besoin de savants' might also be translated as 'has no lack of scientists' or 'has no shortage of scientists', which would change the meaning, if indeed he actually said this.) (Note: According to the 'Le Dictionnaire de pédagogie de Ferdinand Buisson' (1911) the phrase was first employed by Antoine François, comte de Fourcroy in a speech he gave at the Lycée des Arts on 14 Thermidor Year IV commemorating Lavoisier, having actually found it in a report on vandalism by Henri Grégoire. Before this, the phrase had never actually been uttered. Likewise, Édouard Grimaux in 'Lavoisier, 1743-1794' Ayer Publishing 1888 p.376 indicates that the phrase has been attributed by different authors to Coffinhal, to René-François Dumas, or to Fouquier-Tinville, but that neither Fourcroy nor Jérôme Lalande, in his 'Notice sur la vie et les ouvrages de Lavoisier'(1795) make any mention of an appeal for clemency in behalf of Lavoisier.)

On 11 June 1794, the Tribunal was reorganized, and Coffinhal was made one of its three vice-presidents. Six weeks later he presided over the trial of those accused in the Luxembourg Conspiracy and condemned the poet Andre Chenier, only three days before the Thermidorian reaction which brought him down.

== Thermidorian reaction ==
During the evening of 9 Thermidor (27 July 1794) Coffinhal, together with 8 or 10,000 men from the sections and a company of artillery, succeeded in bringing Hanriot from the Committee of General Security to the Hôtel de Ville, Paris. The Convention then declared all the insurgents to be outlaws. After midnight the forces of the Convention stormed the building. Some accounts say that Coffinhal pushed the drunken Hanriot out of a window, shouting 'You fool! It is your cowardice that has lost us!' According to Ernest Hamel this was one of the many legends spread by Barère. Coffinhal managed to escape and made his way along the banks of the Seine to the Île des Cygnes where boatmen from his home region of Cantal concealed him. Eventually hunger forced him to break cover, and on 5 August he made for the house of his mistress Mme Nègre in the rue Montorgueil, but she refused to take him in. He came across someone who owed him money, who agreed to hide him, and then went straight to the police to denounce him. Nine days after his initial escape Coffinhal was arrested, totally exhausted.

The Revolutionary Tribunal itself had been suspended by this time, and he was condemned to death on 18 Thermidor (6 August 1794) by the criminal tribunal of the département, based on simple identification. The same day, the tumbrel took him on his own from the Conciergerie to the Place de Grève where he was guillotined. It is said that as he mounted the scaffold, the jeering crowd yelled at him the phrase he had used so much when presiding at the Revolutionary Tribunal - 'Coffinhal, tu n'as pas la parole!' ('Coffinhal, it's not your turn to speak!'). He was the 55th person executed under the purges of the Thermidorian reaction.

After his execution, an inventory was drawn up of his possessions, which included a cellar of 237 bottles of wine, with 300 empty bottles, and an additional full barrel, amounting to 225 litres of wine all told.
