= Jean-Louis Prieur =

French painter (1759–1795)

Jean-Louis Prieur (1759 – 7 May 1795) was a French painter.

== Life ==
Prieur was known as "le jeune" ("the Younger") to distinguish him from his father, the sculptor, artist and engraver Jean-Louis Prieur (1732-1795), a major figure in French neo-classicism. He was born in Paris and influenced by Cochin and Moreau le Jeune. Enthusiastic about the new ideas of the day, he produced more than sixty drawings or "tableaux historiques" (historical scenes) showing episodes from the French Revolution, now held at the Musée Carnavalet. He was a member of the 'section du Faubourg-Poissonnière' and in September 1793 a jury member on the revolutionary tribunal.

Prieur was arrested after the Insurrection of 12 Germinal, Year III, tried alongside Fouquier-Tinville and guillotined in place de Grève on 7 May 1795, only a day after his father's death. He later served as the model for the character of Gamelin in Anatole France's 1912 novel Les dieux ont soif.

A room in the Musée de la Révolution française bears the name of Jean-Louis Prieur.

== Bibliography ==
- (in French) Philippe de Carbonnières, Prieur, les Tableaux historiques de la Révolution : Catalogue raisonné des dessins originaux (préface de Claude Mazauric), Association Paris-Musées, Éditions Nicolas Chaudun, 2006, 198 pages ISBN 2879009774.
- (in French) Marie-Anne Pirez, Marie-Hélène Trouvelot, Les Prieur, Éditions Archives & Culture, 1993, 96 pages, p. 49.
- (in French) Jules Renouvier, Histoire de l'art pendant la révolution, 1789-1804, Paris, Veuve Jules Renouard, 1863, p. 58-60.
- Warren Roberts, Jacques-Louis David and Jean-Louis Prieur, revolutionary artists: the public, the populace, and images of the French Revolution, Suny Press, 2000, 370 pages.
