= Louis-Joseph Faure =

Louis-Joseph Faure (5 March 1760 – 12 June 1837) was a French jurist and politician who was one of the four authors of the Napoleonic Code.

He was born in Le Havre as the son of fr:Pierre joseph Denis Guillaume Faure, a lawyer and printer; he studied in Caen and became a judge in Paris in 1791. On 18 February 1792 he was elected as assistant to Maximilien Robespierre, the Accusateur public of the Tribunal criminel. The decree of 10 March 1793 created the Revolutionary Tribunal and appointed a public accuser and two deputies to the court Jean-Baptiste Fleuriot-Lescot and Fouquier-Tinville. Within three days Louis-Joseph Faure preferred to give up the post and was replaced by the latter. He and his father were arrested in June 1793 and released during the thermidorian reaction. In November 1795 he was appointed deputy prosecutor of the Seine, and then a member of the Council of Five Hundred. He joined the coup d'état by Bonaparte in 1799 and was appointed in the Tribunat. He became a member of the Conseil d'État in 1807. He submitted a report on the Code de procédure in 1806 and one on the Code pénal in 1810. In 1811 he was sent to Hamburg responsible for the assimilation of the Bouches-de-l'Elbe department. He cooperated with Davout, the military commander and François-Louis-René Mouchard de Chaban. Faure was primarily concerned with, firstly, the implementation with French law in the department, and secondly, the reorganization of the judiciary along French lines. On 25 February, 1824, he entered the Chamber of deputies. He voted with the majority royalist. Appointed an advisor at the court of cassation, 12 November, 1828, he was still in this position at his death.

== Source ==
- Dictionnaire Bouillet
