= Law of 22 Prairial =

1794 law of the Great Terror in revolutionary France

National Convention
- Long title: Law concerning the Revolutionary Tribunal, of 22 Prairial, in the second year of the French Republic, one and indivisible
- Territorial extent: France
- Enacted: 10 June 1794
- Repealed: 1 August 1794

Legislative history
- Rapporteur: Georges Couthon
- Committee responsible: Public Safety
- Passed: 10 June 1794

Repealed by
- Law repealing the Law of 22 Prairial concerning the organization of the Revolutionary Tribunal, of 14 Thermidor

Keywords
- Revolutionary Tribunal

Text of statute as originally enacted
- Status: Repealed

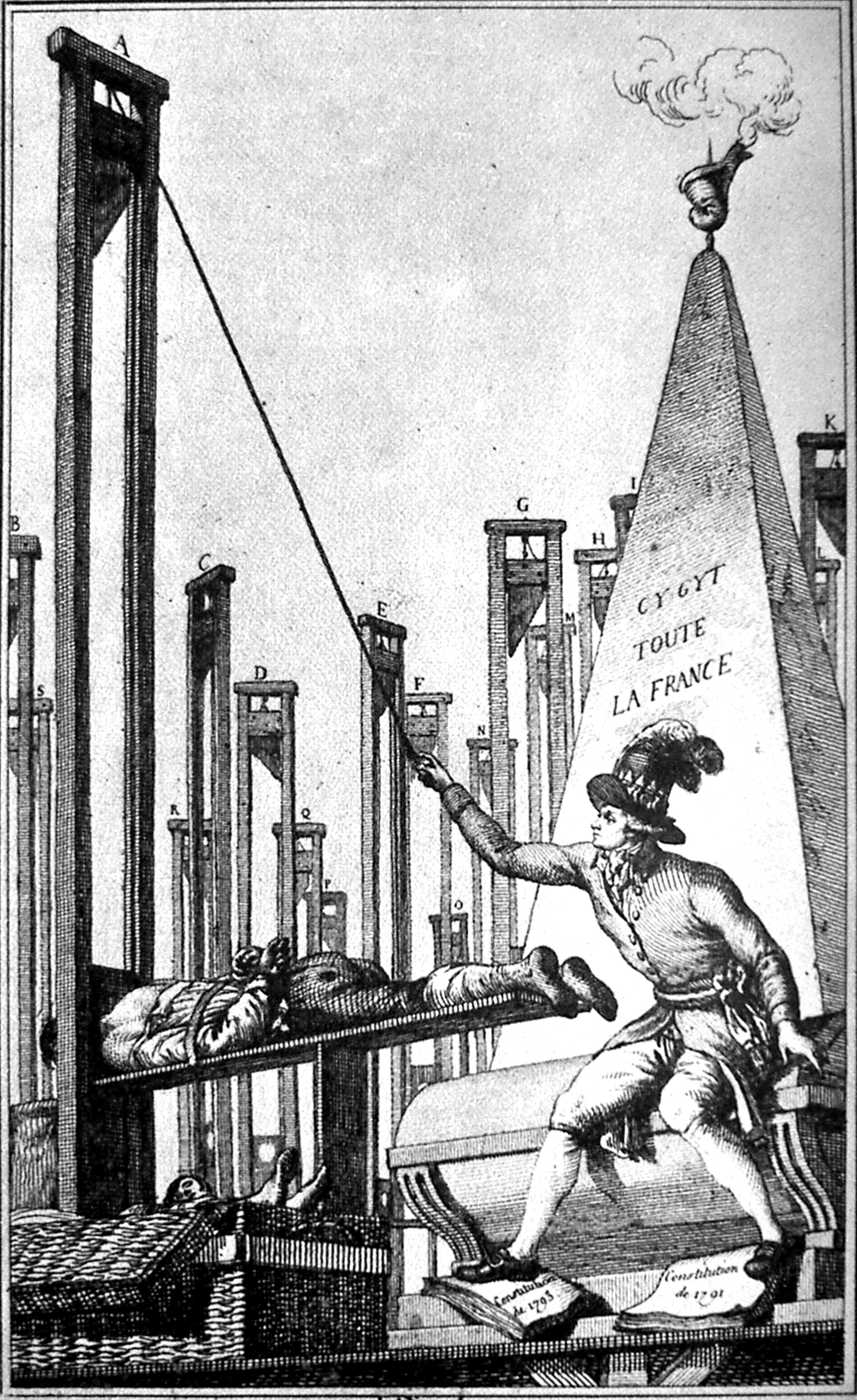
Contemporary cartoon showing Robespierre executing the executioner. The monument in the background carries the inscription 'Here Lies All Of France'

The Law of 22 Prairial, also known as the loi de la Grande Terreur, the law of the Great Terror, was enacted on 10 June 1794 (22 Prairial of the Year II under the French Revolutionary Calendar). It was proposed by Georges Auguste Couthon but seems to have been written by Maximilien Robespierre according to Laurent Lecointre. Using this law, the Committee of Public Safety simplified the judicial process to one of indictment and prosecution.

== Background ==
The immediate background to the introduction of the Prairial Law was the attempted assassinations of Jean-Marie Collot d'Herbois on 23 May and of Maximilien Robespierre on 25 May. Introducing the decree at the Convention, Georges Couthon, who had drafted it, argued that political crimes were far worse than common crimes because in the latter "only individuals are wounded" whereas in the former "the existence of free society is threatened". Under these circumstances, "indulgence is an atrocity... clemency is parricide". The law was an extension of the centralisation and organisation of the Terror, following the decrees of 16 April and 8 May which had suspended the revolutionary court in the provinces and brought all political cases for trial in the capital. The result of these laws was that by June 1794 Paris was full of suspects awaiting trial. On 29 April it was reported that the forty prisons of Paris contained 6,921 prisoners; by 11 June this number had increased to 7,321 and by 28 July to 7,800.

No Revolutionary Tribunal could work fast enough to prevent the ship of state sinking under such a sea of crime. What was to be done? Precedents had been created at Lyon, Marseille and elsewhere.... at Orange in particular, there had been set up, by decree of the Convention, a Commission of Five, which, by dispensing with the usual formalities of counsel and witness, had succeeded in condemning to death, within two months, 332 out of the 591 persons brought before it.

The law was also prompted by the idea that members of the Convention who had supported Georges Danton were politically unreliable - a view shared by Robespierre, Couthon, Saint-Just and others. They felt that these people needed to be brought swiftly to justice without a full debate by the Convention itself. They considered Jean-Pierre-André Amar, for example, to be suspect.

== Purpose ==
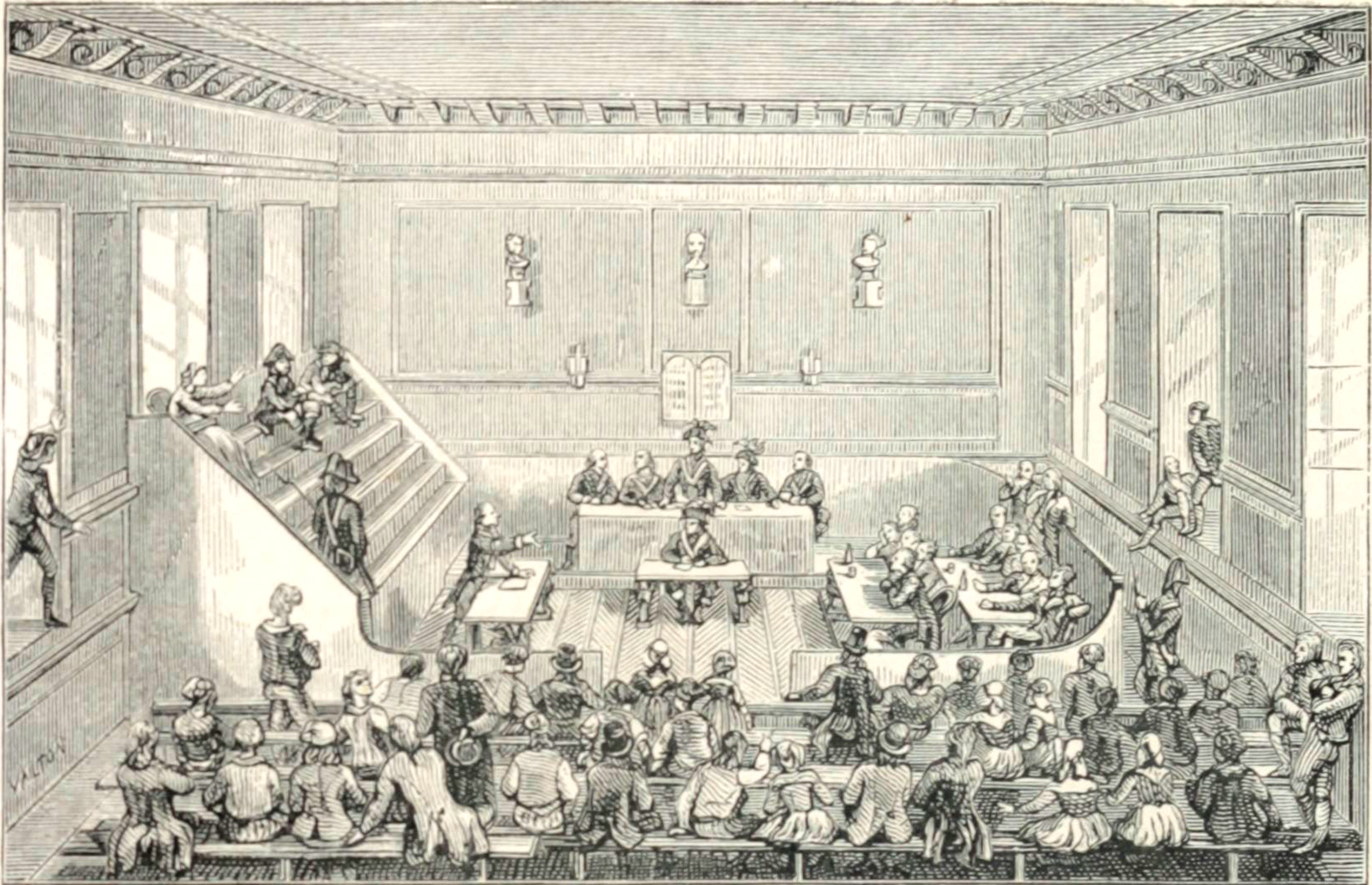
Revolutionary Tribunal in session

- The law extended the reach of the Revolutionary Tribunal, which henceforth could hear cases for "slandering patriotism", "seeking to inspire discouragement", "spreading false news" and "depraving morals, corrupting the public conscience and impairing the purity and energy of the revolutionary government".
- It placed an active obligation on all citizens to denounce and bring to justice those suspected - "Every citizen is empowered to seize conspirators and counterrevolutionaries, and to bring them before the magistrates. He is required to denounce them as soon as he knows of them." As Couthon explained to the Convention, "For a citizen to become suspect it is sufficient that rumour accuses him".
- It limited trials in the Revolutionary Tribunal to three days.
- It prevented the Revolutionary Tribunal both from calling witnesses, or from allowing defence counsel to the accused. Juries were to come to judgement entirely on the basis of the accusation and the accused's own defence.
- It required the Tribunal to come to one of only two possible verdicts - acquittal or death.
- The law cancelled all previous legislation on the same subject. Without being explicit, this removed the immunity of members of the Convention, which until then had protected them from summary arrest and required that the Convention itself vote to send any of its members to trial.
- The law would free the Revolutionary Tribunals from control by the Convention and would greatly strengthen the position of the accusateur public by limiting the ability of suspects to defend themselves. Furthermore, the law broadened the sorts of charges that could be brought so that virtually any criticism of the government became criminal.

== Effect ==
The Prairial Law had an immediate effect on the tempo of executions under the Terror. From an average of five executions a day in Germinal, the rate rose to seventeen in Prairial and twenty-six in Messidor. The law thus inaugurated the period known as "The Great Terror".

Revolutionary month	Executions	Acquittals
Germinal	155	59
Floréal	354	159
Prairial	509	164
Messidor	796	208
Thermidor 1-9	342	84

== Consequences ==
The proposals were met with dismay when they were presented to the Convention. The Committee of Public Safety had not reviewed the text before it was presented, although it was presented in the name of the Committee itself. The Committee of General Security had not even been informed that the law was being drafted.

Some of the deputies were uneasy, in particular, about the removal of their immunity and asked for the debate to be adjourned so the clauses could be examined. Robespierre refused and demanded immediate discussion. At his insistence the entire decree was voted on, clause by clause. It passed. The next day, 11 June, when Robespierre was absent, Bourdon de l'Oise and Merlin de Douai put forward an amendment proclaiming the inalienable right of the Convention to impeach its own members. The amendment was passed.

Furious, Robespierre and Couthon returned to the Convention the next day, 12 June, and demanded that the amendment of the previous day be revoked. Robespierre made a number of veiled threats and during the debate clashed particularly with Jean-Lambert Tallien. The Convention acceded to Robespierre's wishes and restored the original text of the decree Couthon had drafted.

As the Terror accelerated and members felt more and more threatened, Tallien and others began to make plans for the overthrow of Robespierre. Less than two months later, on 27 July, Tallien and his associates overthrew Robespierre, beginning the Thermidorian Reaction.

The Law of 22 Prairial was repealed on 1 August 1794 and Antoine Quentin Fouquier-Tinville, who had presided over the Revolutionary Tribunal, was arrested and later guillotined.

== See also ==
- Law of Suspects
