= Foreste =

- Commune
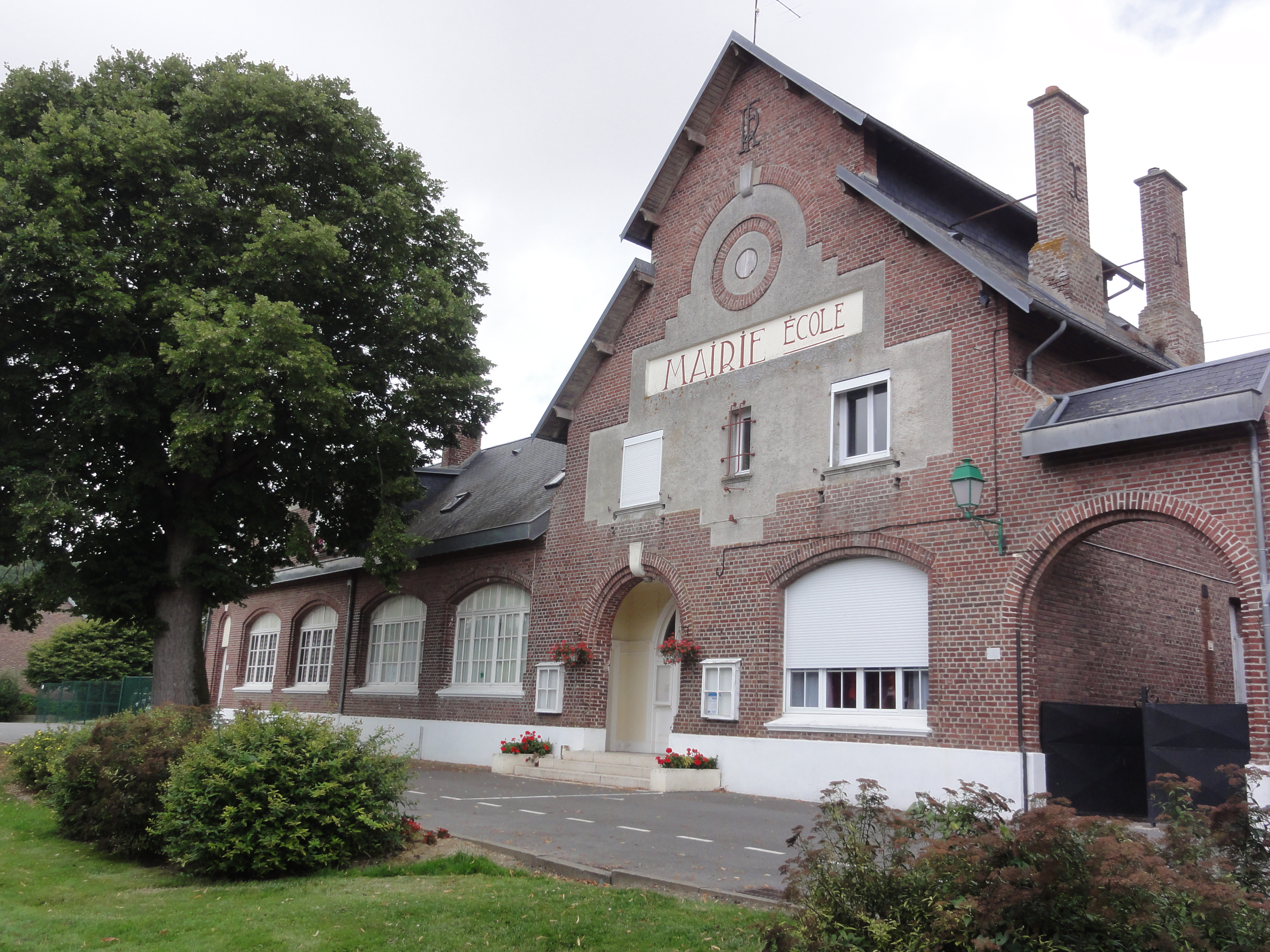
- The town hall and school of Foreste

- Coat of arms
- Location of Foreste
- Location within France Location within Hauts-de-France
- Coordinates: 49°48′34″N 3°05′59″E
- Country: France
- Region: Hauts-de-France
- Department: Aisne
- Arrondissement: Saint-Quentin
- Canton: Saint-Quentin-1
- Intercommunality: Pays du Vermandois

Government
  - Mayor (2026–32): Jean-Baptiste Fouquier d'Herouel
- Area^{1}: 4.94 km^{2} (1.91 sq mi)
- Elevation: 80 m (260 ft)
- Highest elevation: 91 m (299 ft)
- Lowest elevation: 63 m (207 ft)
- Population (2023): 166
  - Density: 33.6/km^{2} (87.0/sq mi)
- Time zone: UTC+01:00 (CET)
  - Summer (DST): UTC+02:00 (CEST)
- INSEE/Postal code: 02327 /02590
- ^{1} French Land Register data, which excludes lakes, ponds, glaciers > 1 km^{2} (0.386 sq mi or 247 acres) and river estuaries.

Foreste (French pronunciation: [fɔʁɛst]) is a commune in the Aisne department in Hauts-de-France in northern France.

== Population ==
Historical population
Year	Pop.	±% p.a.
1968	170	—
1975	163	−0.60%
1982	199	+2.89%
1990	165	−2.31%
1999	143	−1.58%
2007	179	+2.85%
2012	177	−0.22%
2017	165	−1.39%
2023	166	+0.10%
Source: INSEE

== See also ==
- Communes of the Aisne department
