= Accusateur public =

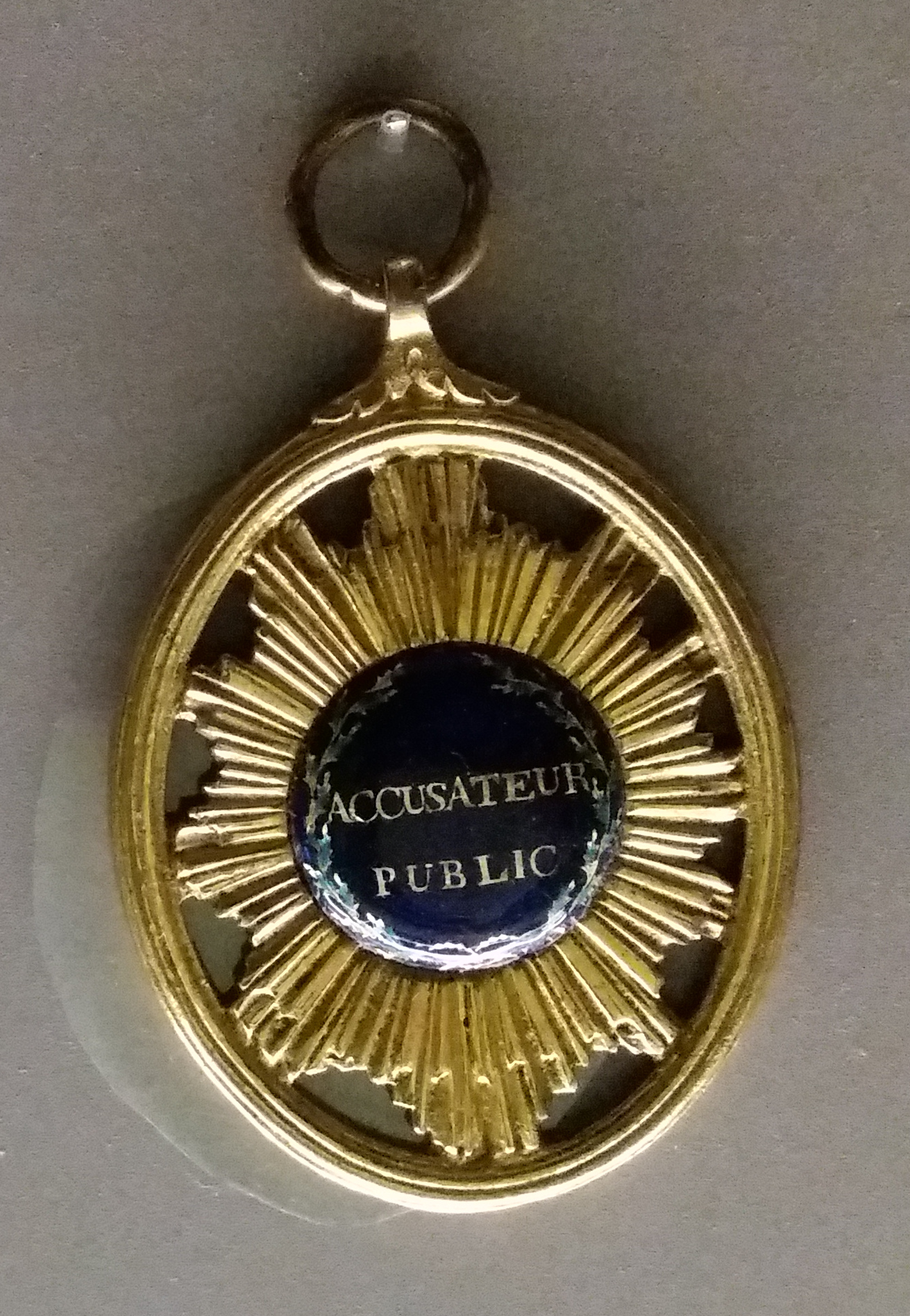
Accusateur public – Insigne du Tribunal révolutionnaire

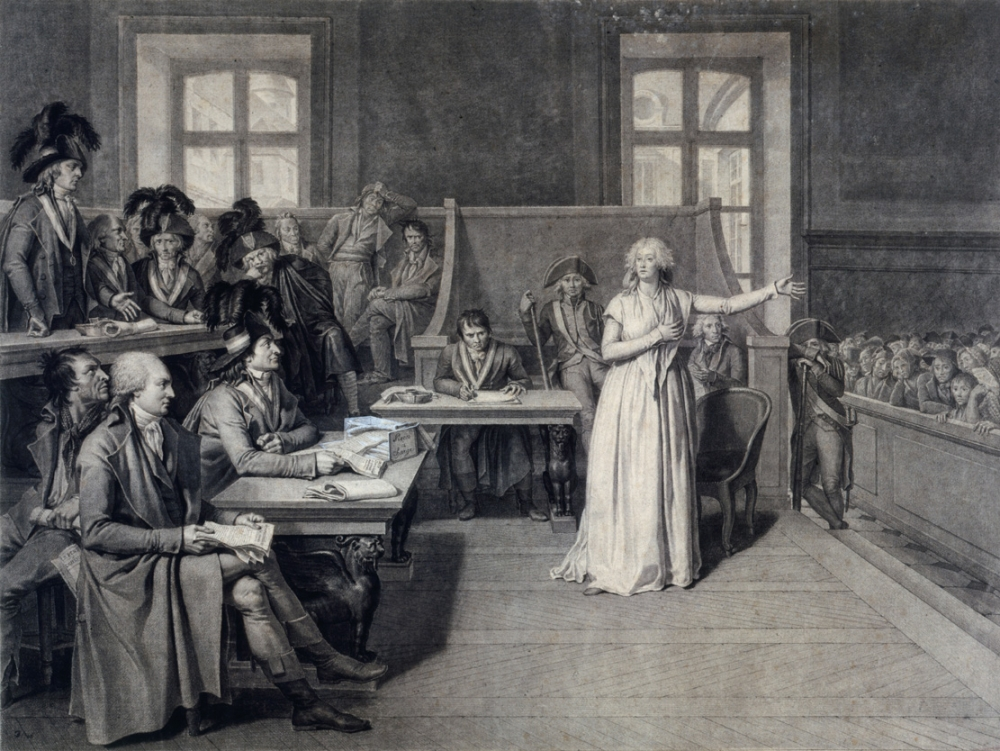
Trial of Marie-Antoinette on 15 October 1793. The public accusor is sitting behind his desk.

The function of public accuser, defending society, was established during the French Revolution by the decrees of 1 December 1790, 16 September 1791, 15 December 1791 and 15 February 1792, and disappeared in 1799 when the Constitution of 22 Frimaire An VIII was introduced, establishing the reconstitution of the public accuser's office as it had existed under the Ancien Régime.

Elected, as with the other judges of the criminal court, the accuser was responsible for prosecuting offences admitted to the indictment by the grand jury. He was to receive complaints and ensure that court decisions were carried out. Public accusers also took over the administrative role of supervising judicial police officers, justice of the peace and gendarmerie officers.

On 29 September 1791, the French Constituent Assembly decided that "public accusers will have the same costume as judges, with the exception of the feathers, placed around their hats; they will wear medals with the words 'public safety'.

In each criminal court, the public accuser was responsible for prosecuting the case on behalf of the king, defending his prerogatives. The other judges were elected on 15 February 1792. On 18 February 1792 Louis-Joseph Faure was elected as assistant to Robespierre. On 24 February 1792 Louis Pierre Manuel as procureur of the commune, charged with both the investigation and prosecution of crime, gave a speech. (Manuel cooperated with Robespierre responsible for the coordination of the local and the federal police in the department and the sections.) On 10 April, Robespierre resigned the unenviable position of "public accuser".

The decree of 10 March 1793 created the Revolutionary Tribunal and appointed a public accuser Louis-Joseph Faure and two deputies to the court Jean-Baptiste Fleuriot-Lescot and Fouquier-Tinville. Within three days Faure preferred to give up the post and was replaced by the latter, an office that he filled from the end of the month until 1 August 1794. His office as public accuser arguably reflected a need to display the appearance of legality during what was essentially political command, more than a need to establish actual guilt. After the Thermidorian reaction, his powers were gradually framed and decreased to the benefit of the commissioner of the executive power.

== List of public accusers in Paris ==
1. Pierre Louis Manuel till 15 February 1792
2. Maximilien de Robespierre from 15 February to 10 April 1792
3. Georges Antoine Chabot de l'Allier from 11 April to 16 August 1792?
4. Pierre-François Réal from 17 August 1792 to 12 March 1793?
5. Louis-Joseph Faure 13 March 1793 (rejected election)
6. Antoine Quentin Fouquier-Tinville from March 1793 to 1 August 1794
7. Michel-Joseph Leblois from August 1794 to January 1795
8. Antoine Judicis from January 1795 to 31 May 1795
