= Georges Couthon =

French politician and lawyer (1755–1794)

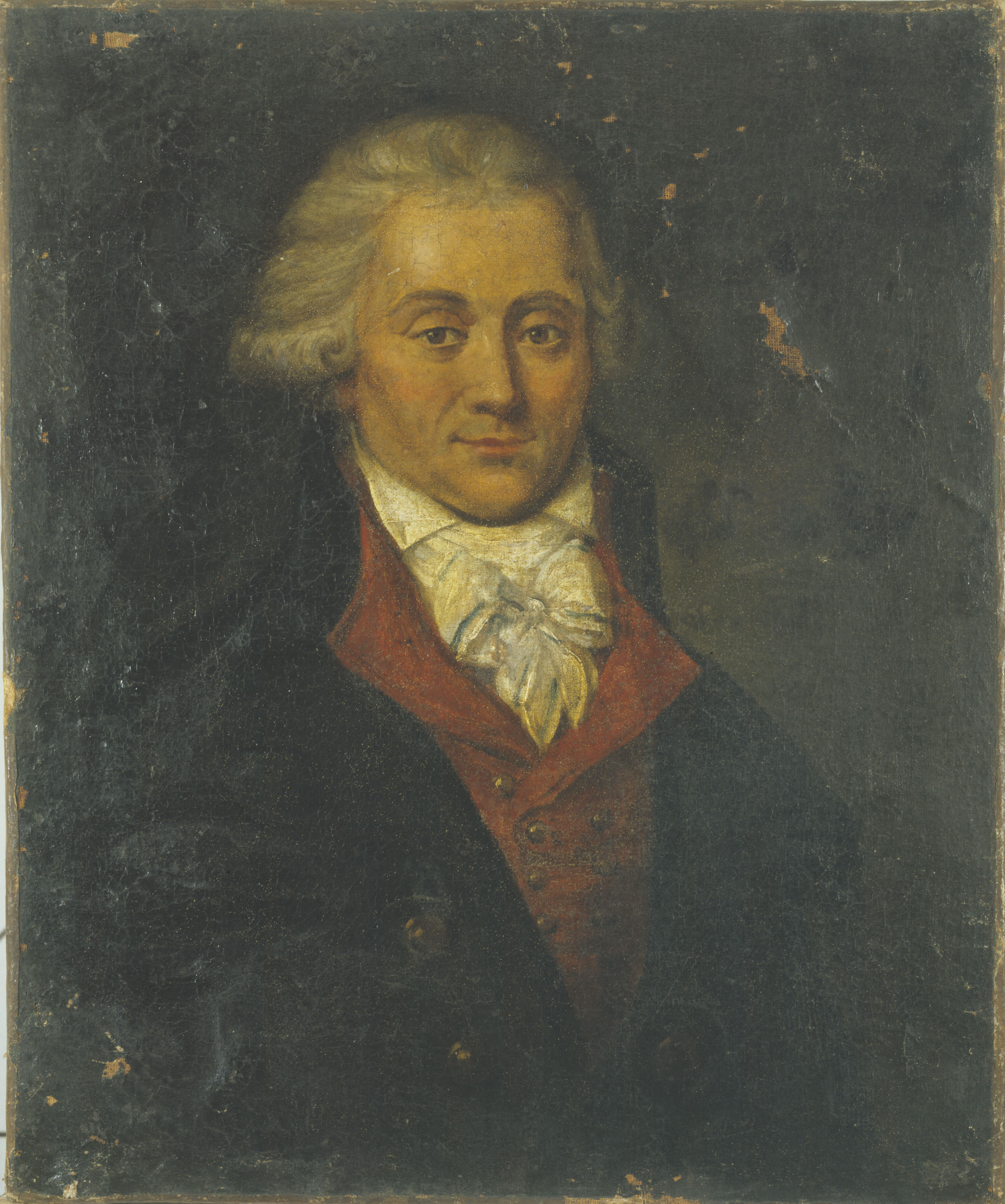
- Presumed portrait of Georges Couthon by François Bonneville, 1790

Member of the Committee of Public Safety
- In office 10 July 1793 – 28 July 1794

33rd President of the National Convention
- In office 21 December 1793 – 5 January 1794
- Preceded by: Jean-Henri Voulland
- Succeeded by: Jacques Louis David

Deputy of the National Convention
- In office 20 September 1792 – 10 July 1794
- Succeeded by: Gilbert-Amable Jourde
- Constituency: Puy-de-Dôme

Personal details
- Born: 22 December 1755 Orcet, Kingdom of France
- Died: 28 July 1794 (aged 38) Place de la Révolution, Paris, France
- Party: The Mountain
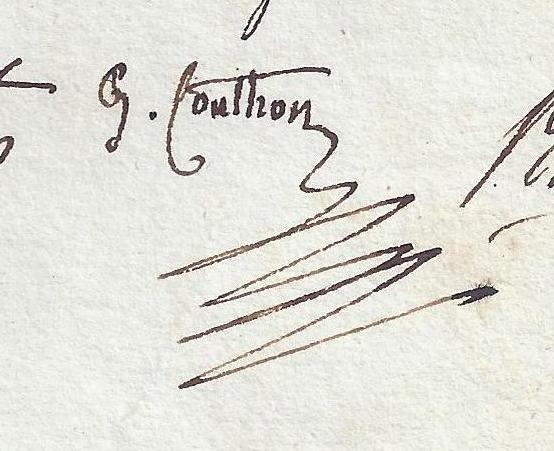
- Signature

Georges Auguste Couthon (French pronunciation: [ʒɔʁʒ oɡyst kutɔ̃], 22 December 1755 – 28 July 1794) was a French politician and lawyer known for his service as a deputy in the Legislative Assembly during the French Revolution. Couthon was elected to the Committee of Public Safety on 30 May 1793. Along with his close associate Louis Antoine de Saint-Just and Maximilien Robespierre, he formed an unofficial triumvirate within the committee which wielded power during the Reign of Terror until the three were arrested and executed in 1794 during the Thermidorian Reaction. A Freemason, Couthon played an important role in the development of the Law of 22 Prairial, which was responsible for a sharp increase in the number of executions of accused counter-revolutionaries.

== Background ==
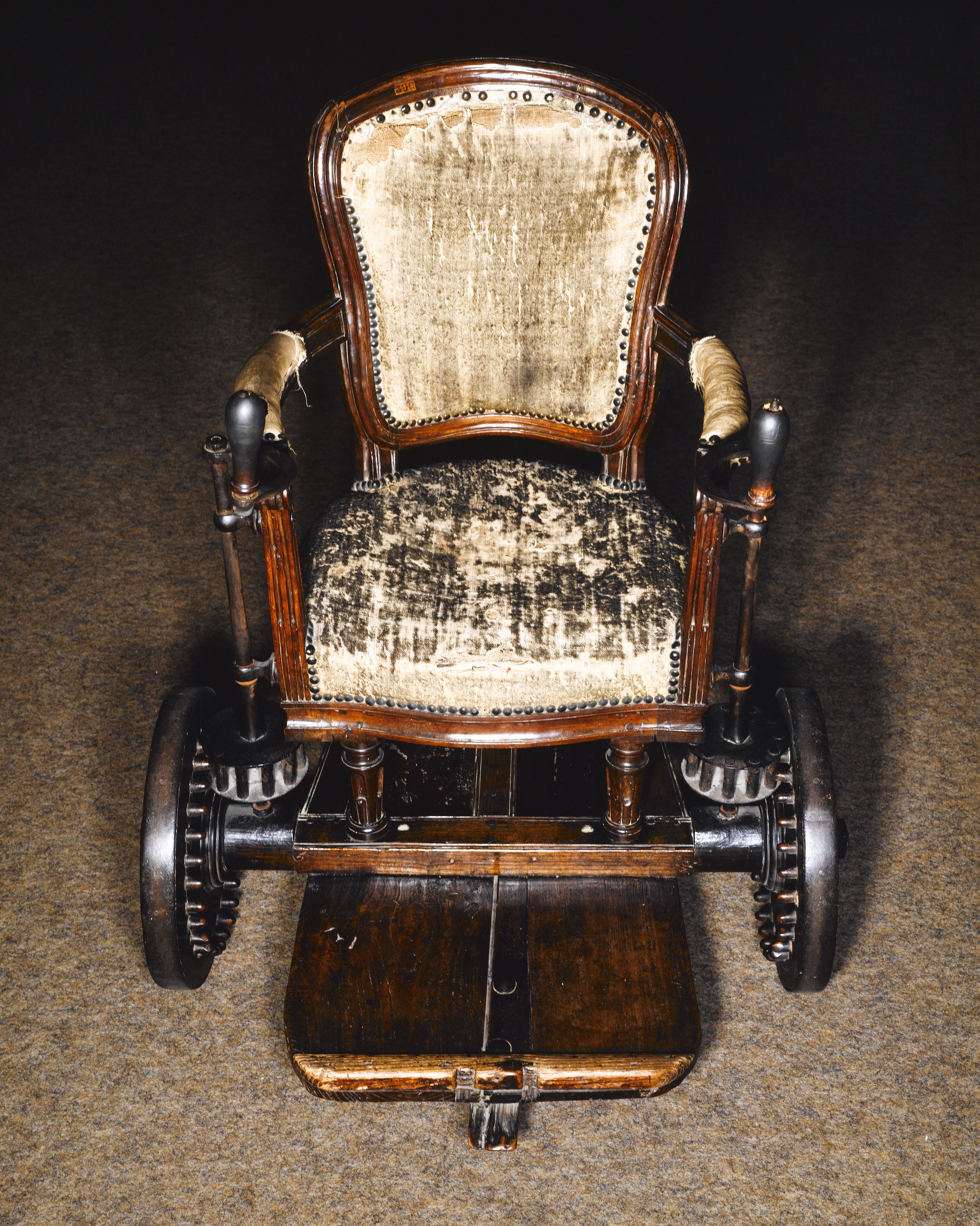
Couthon's wheelchair from c. 1780, Musée Carnavalet, Paris

Couthon was born on 22 December 1755 in Orcet in the province of Auvergne. His father was a notary, and his mother was the daughter of a shopkeeper. Couthon, like generations of his family before him, was a member of the lower bourgeoisie.

Georges Couthon suffered joint problems from childhood, however it was not until 1782 that his condition significantly worsened, necessitating the use of a cane by 1791. Doctors diagnosed Couthon with meningitis in 1792, but Couthon blamed his paralysis on the frequent sexual experiences of his youth. Although he began treating his condition with mineral baths, he grew so weak by 1793 that he began using a wheelchair driven by hand cranks via gears.

Following in his father's footsteps, Couthon became a notary. The skills that he acquired enabled him to serve on the Provincial Assembly of Auvergne in 1787, his first experience of politics. This same year, 1787 he married Marie Brunet and his first son Antoine was born. His other son Hippolyte would be born in 1790. He was well-regarded by others as an honest well-mannered individual.

His political aspirations took him away from Orcet and to Paris, and he joined the Freemasons in 1790 in Clermont. There, he became a fixture at its literary society, where he earned acclaim for his discussion on the topic of "Patience".

== Deputy ==
In 1791, Couthon traveled to Paris to fulfill his duty as a deputy in the Legislative Assembly, representing Puy-de-Dôme. He then joined the growing Jacobin Club of Paris. He chose to sit on the Left at the first meeting of the Assembly but soon decided against associating himself with such radicals, as he feared they were "shocking the majority". Reportedly, he was also a very proficient speaker.

In September 1792, Couthon was elected to the National Convention. During a visit to Flanders, where he sought treatment for his health, he met and befriended Charles François Dumouriez, later writing praises of him to the Assembly and referred to him as "a man essential to us." His relationship with Dumouriez briefly caused Couthon to consider joining the Girondist faction of the Assembly, but after the Girondist electors of the Committee of the Constitution refused Couthon a seat on the Committee in October 1792, he ultimately committed himself to the Montagnards and the inner group formed around Maximilien Robespierre; both shared many opinions. Couthon became an enthusiastic supporter of the Montagnards and often echoed their opinions. At the Trial of Louis XVI in December 1792, he argued loudly against the Girondist request for a referendum and went on to vote for the death sentence without appeal. On 30 May 1793 Couthon was appointed secretary of the original Committee of Public Safety. Couthon and 5 others, including his close friend Louis Antoine de Saint-Just, were brought in to assist in the drafting of the French Constitution of 1793. Three days after rising to that position, Couthon was the first to demand the arrest of proscribed Girondists.

== Lyon ==
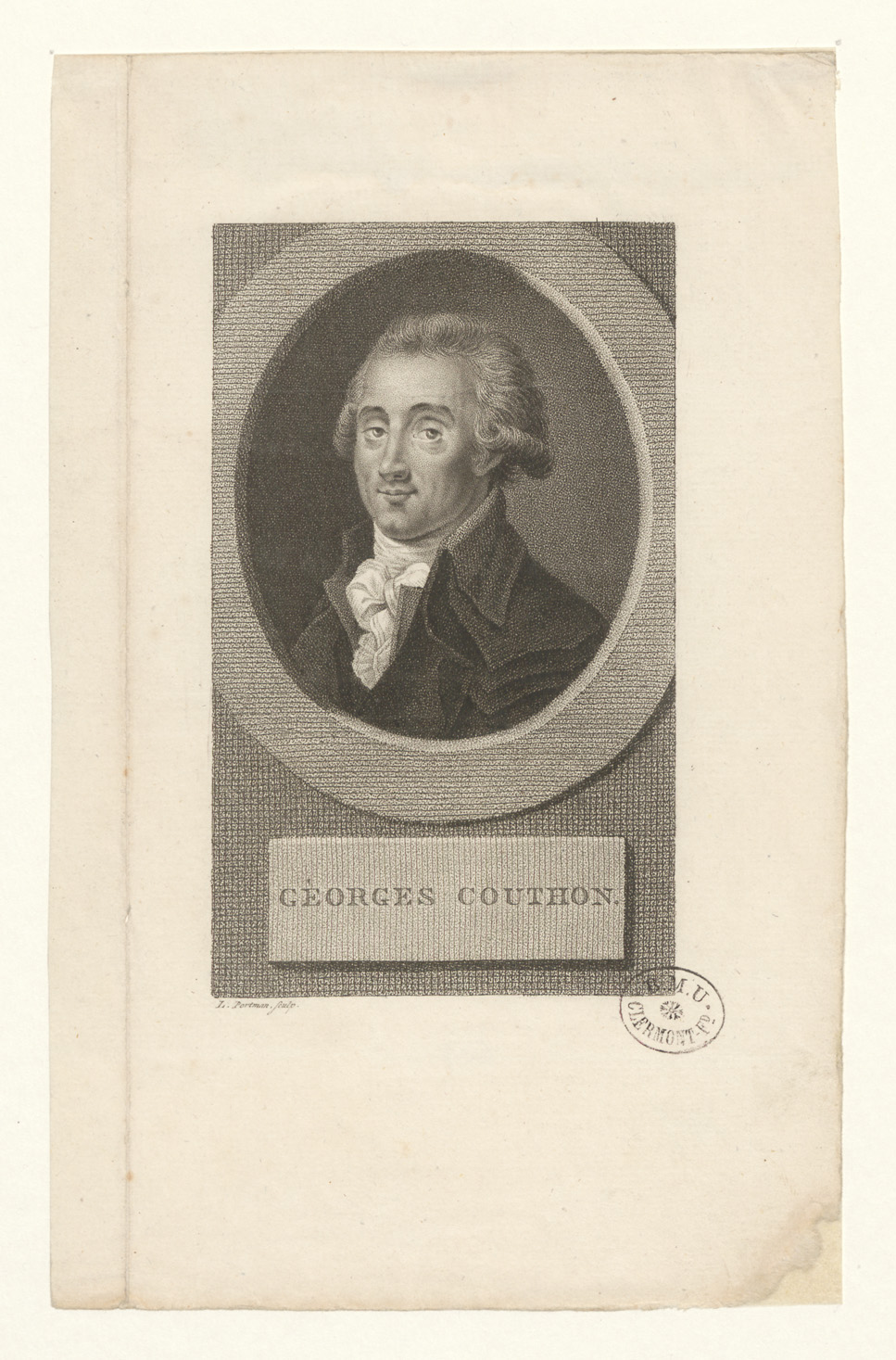
BOYER 607 - Georges Couthon

Growing unrest had been occurring in Lyon in late February and early May. By 5 July 1793, the National Convention determined the city of Lyon to be "in a state of rebellion", and by September, the Committee of Public Safety decided to send representatives to Lyon to end the rebellion. Couthon would be the representative to whom Lyon would surrender on 9 October 1793. He was suspicious of the unrest in Lyon upon his arrival and would not allow the Jacobins of the local administration to meet with one another for fear of an uprising.

In August, Couthon carried a law punishing any person who should sell assignats at less than their nominal value with imprisonment for twenty years in chains; on 8 September making investments in foreign countries punishable with death. On 12 October 1793, the Committee of Public Safety passed a decree that it believed would make an example of Lyon. The decree specified that the city itself was to be destroyed. Following the decree, Couthon established special courts to supervise the demolition of the richest homes in Lyon and leave the homes of the poor untouched. In addition to the demolition of the city, the decree dictated that the rebels and the traitors were to be executed. Couthon had difficulty accepting the destruction of Lyon and did not even contribute much to the property destruction. Eventually, he would find that he could not stomach the task at hand, and by the end of October the National Convention sent a replacement. Republican atrocities in Lyon began after Couthon was replaced on 3 November 1793 by Jean Marie Collot d'Herbois, who would go on to condemn 1,880 Lyonnais by April 1794.

== Law of 22 Prairial ==
Following his departure from Lyon, Couthon returned to Paris, and on 21 December, he was elected president of the convention. In March 1794, he contributed to the prosecution of the Hébertists and Dantonists (or Indulgents). His orientation to Louis Antoine de Saint-Just and Maximilien Robespierre's program at this time is not clear, but he did go along with the prosecutions and executions. He continued serving on the Committee of Public Safety for the next several months. On 10 June 1794 (22 Prairial Year II on the French Republican Calendar), Couthon drafted the Law of 22 Prairial with the aid of Robespierre. On the pretext of shortening proceedings, the law deprived the accused of the aid of counsel and of witnesses for their defence in the case of trials before the Revolutionary Tribunal. The Revolutionary Tribunals were charged with quick verdicts of innocence or death for the accused brought before them. The reason for the law was also related to the number of executions going on in the provinces and the lack of standard judicial proceedings for these improvised tribunals.

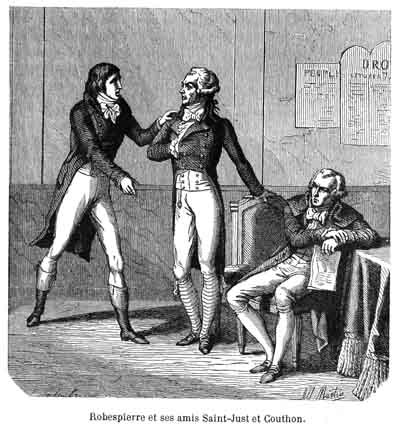
Triumvirate (left to right) of Saint-Just, Robespierre and Couthon

Couthon proposed the law without consulting the rest of the Committee of Public Safety, as both Couthon and Robespierre expected that the committee would not be receptive to it. The Convention raised objections to the measure, but Couthon justified the measure by arguing that the political crimes overseen by the Revolutionary Tribunals were considerably worse than common crimes because "the existence of free society is threatened." Couthon also famously justified the deprivation of the right to a counsel by declaring, "The guilty have no such right and the innocents do not need any."

Robespierre assisted Couthon in his arguments by subtly implying that any member of the Convention who objected to the new bill should fear being exposed as a traitor to the republic. Collot d'Herbois, Fouché and Tallien feared for their lives, due to the military excesses carried out by them in various regions of France to stamp out opposition to the revolutionary government. They feared that they would be exposed as having committed crimes against humanity. Almost all the deputies agreed it had become dangerous. Couthon proposed his resignation "rather than be suspected of taking part in measures" against his colleagues.

The law passed, and the rate of executions in Paris promptly rose. In Paris, compared to an average of 5 executions, which had been the norm two months earlier (Germinal), 17 executions would take place daily during Prairial, with 26 occurring daily during the following month of Messidor. Between the passing of the Law of 22 Prairial (10 June 1794) and the end of July 1794, 1,515 executions took place at the Place du Trône-Renversé, now Place de la Nation, more than half of the final total of 2,639 executions that occurred between March 1793 and August 1794.

== Arrest and execution ==
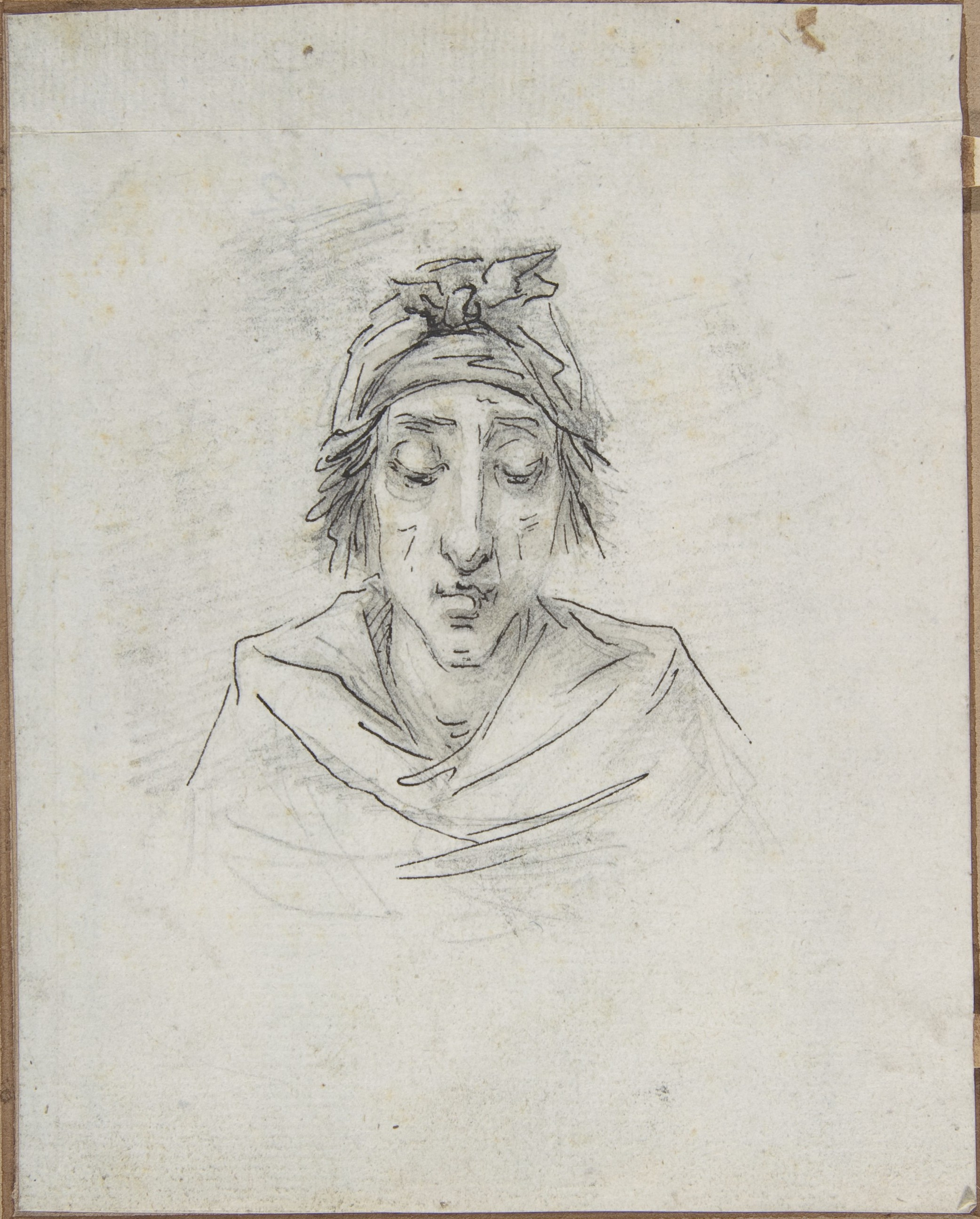
Couthon on his way to the guillotine on 28 July 1794, sketch by Vivant Denon

During the crisis preceding the Thermidorian Reaction, Couthon gave up a journey to Auvergne in order, as he wrote, that he might "either die or triumph with Robespierre". Robespierre had disappeared from the political arena for an entire month because of a supposed nervous breakdown as well as for health reasons and therefore did not realise that the situation in the convention had changed. His last speech seemed to indicate that another purge of the convention was necessary, but he refused to name names. In a panic of self-preservation, the Convention called for the arrest of Robespierre and his affiliates, including Couthon, Saint-Just and Robespierre's own brother, Augustin Robespierre. Couthon was guillotined on 10 Thermidor alongside Robespierre, but it took the executioner fifteen minutes (amidst Couthon's screams of pain) to arrange him on the board correctly because of his paralysis.

== Legacy ==
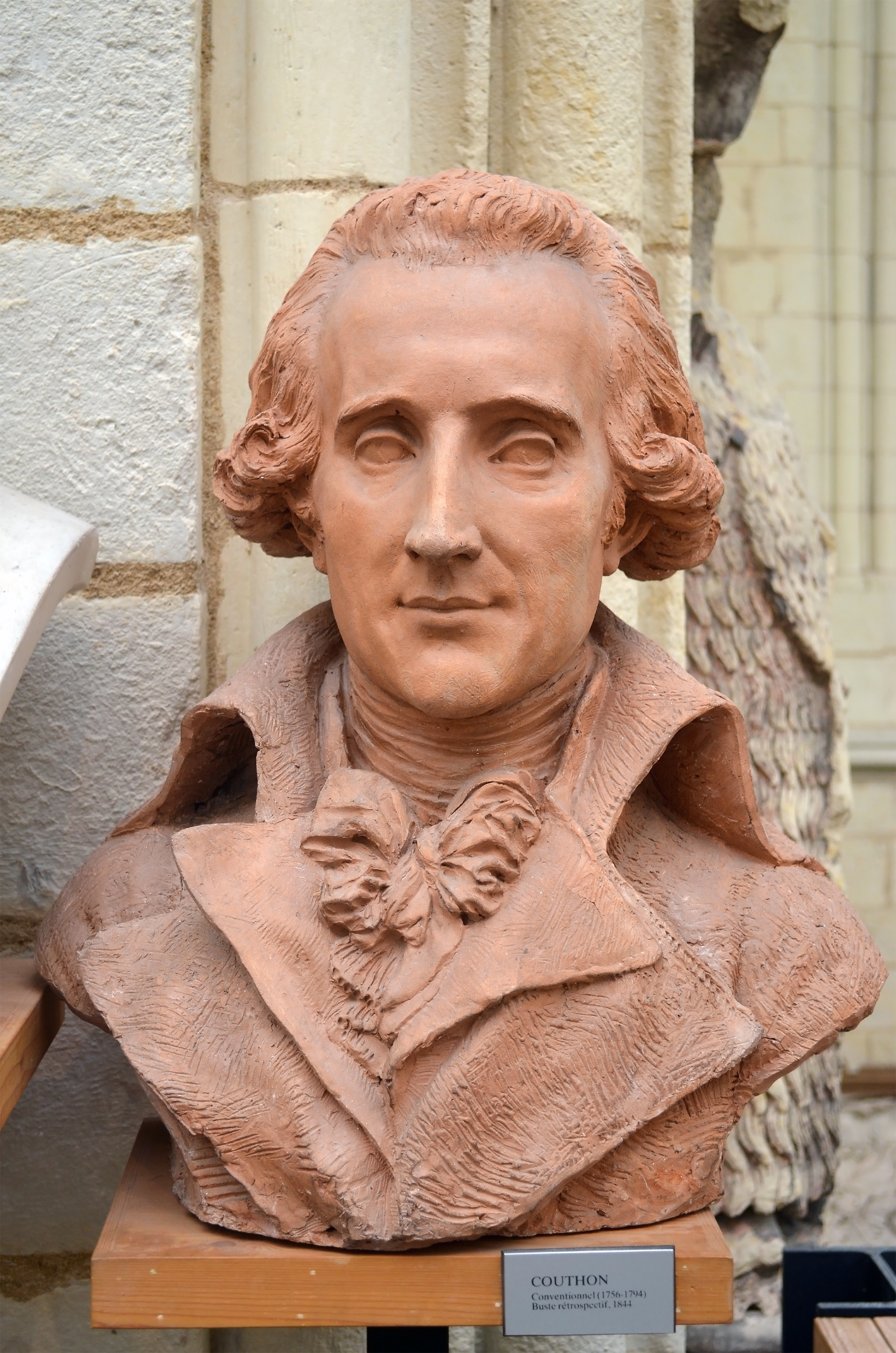
Bust of Georges Couthon by David d'Angers (1844).

The Law of 22 Prairial allowed tribunals to target noblemen and members of the clergy, as the accused no longer could call character witnesses on their behalf. Of the victims executed during June and July 1794, 38% were of noble descent and 26% represented the clergy. More than half of the victims came from the wealthier parts of the bourgeoisie.
