= Jacques-Bernard-Marie Montané =

Jacques-Bernard-Marie Montané (5 January 1751, Toulouse–after 1805) was president of the Revolutionary Tribunal from March to August in 1793, during the French Revolution.

He was president at the trial of Charlotte Corday.

He was seen as insufficiently radical, and was replaced by Martial Herman.

He survived the Thermidorian Reaction.

== Sources ==
- Landeux, Philippe Le tribunal révolutionnaire de Paris (1793-1795) (2017)
