= Léopold Renaudin =

French revolutionary and guillotine victim

Léopold Renaudin (11 March 1749 – 7 May 1795) was a French revolutionary sworn to the Revolutionary Tribunal.

== Career ==
Renaudin was born in Saint-Remy in the Vosges, the son of Gaspard Renaudin, shoemaker, and Mary Anne Miquel. He became a luthier and worked in Paris at the Royal Academy of Music. In 1776, he moved to rue Saint-Honoré, close to the Opera, in the section of the Oratory, where he remained until the end of his days. In his work, he is particularly known for his basses, which are still sought after in the 21st century.

A supporter of revolutionary ideals, he became an elector of his section 1791 and 1792. Mandated by the section to demand in the Legislature on 3 August 1792 that the king be deposed, he sat on the Paris Commune on August 10. One of the most energetic members of the Jacobin Club, the jury considered him the hardest of those tried in the Revolutionary Court. At trial, he defended himself, like most defendants, by saying: "At that time, everyone would have voted as we did". Sentenced to death on 17 Floreal, year III, he was guillotined the next day in Paris, on the Place de Grève, with fifteen co-defendants.
