= Revolutionary Tribunal =

Tribunal during the French Revolution

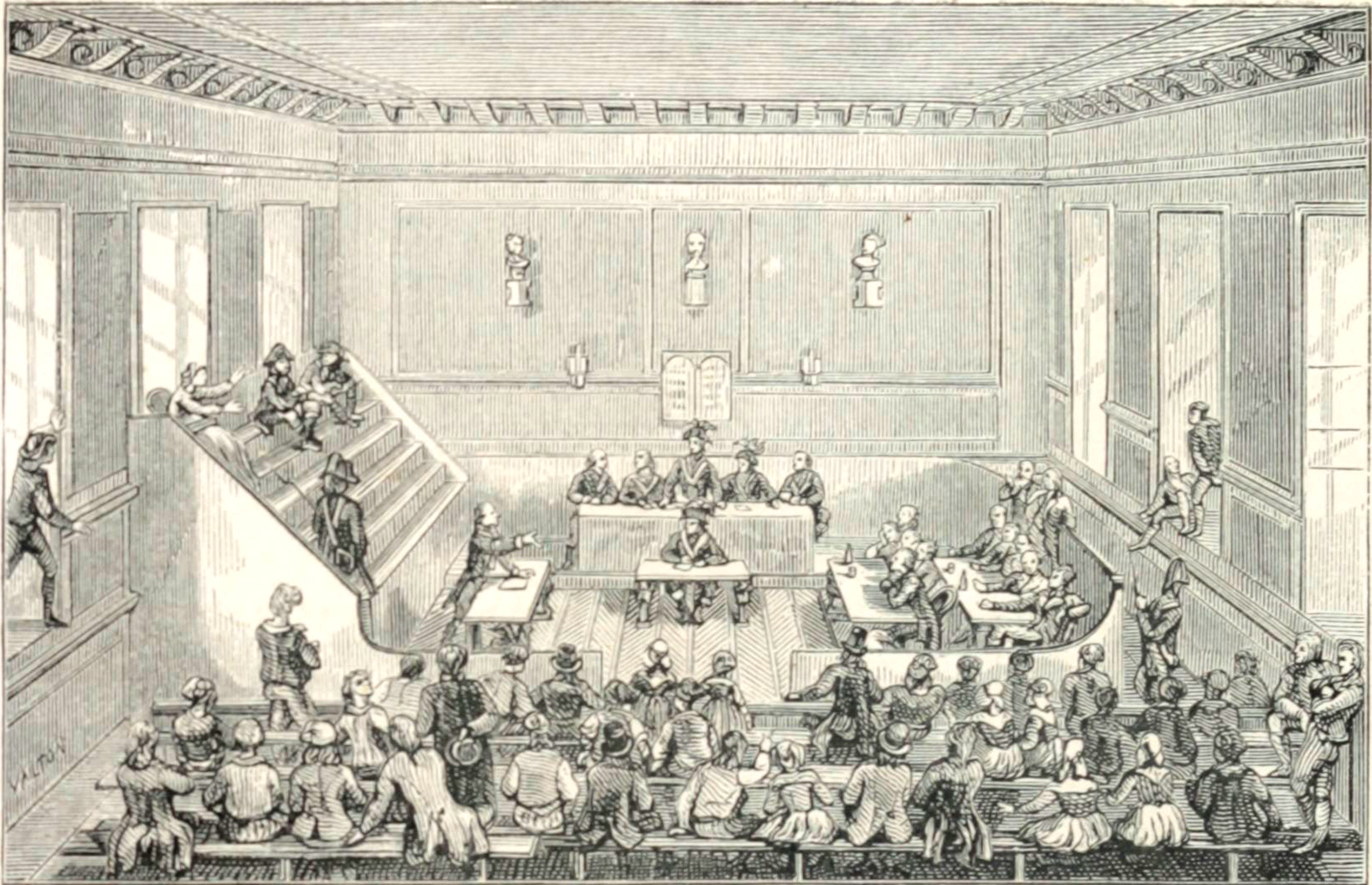
The Tribunal, from La Démagogie en 1793 à Paris by Dauban (H. Plon; 1868)

The Revolutionary Tribunal (French: Tribunal révolutionnaire; unofficially Popular Tribunal) was a court instituted by the National Convention during the French Revolution for the trial of political offenders. In October 1793, it became one of the most powerful engines of the period often called the Reign of Terror.

== Judicial reforms ==
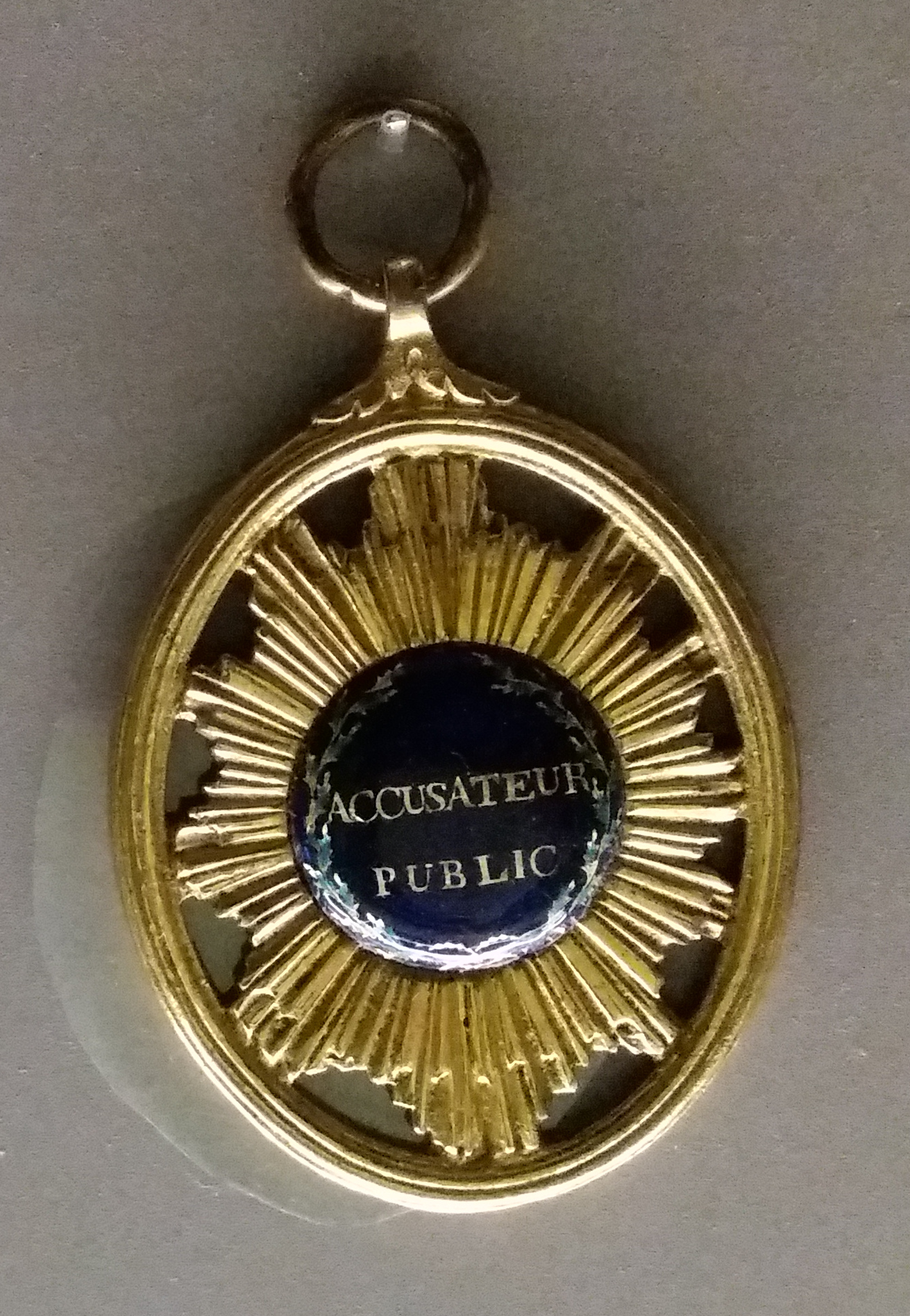
Accusateur public – Insigne du Tribunal révolutionnaire

In early 1791, freedom of defence became the standard; any citizen was allowed to defend another. From the beginning, the authorities were concerned about this experiment. Derasse suggests it was a "collective suicide" by the lawyers in the Assembly. In criminal cases, the expansion of the right ... gave priority to the spoken word. By December 1791, deputies voted themselves the power to select the judges, jury and accusateur public. On 15 February 1792 the Tribunal Criminel was installed with Maximilien Robespierre as accusateur. On 10 April, Robespierre decided to give up his position and became an ordinary citizen who published a magazine. Along with other Jacobins, he urged in the fifth issue of his magazine the creation of an "armée révolutionnaire" in Paris, consisting of at least 20,000 or 23,000 men, to defend the city, "liberty" (the revolution), maintain order in the sections and educate the members in democratic principles; an idea promoted by Jean-Jacques Rousseau.

== Origin ==
The provisional Revolutionary Tribunal was established on 17 August 1792 in response to the Storming of the Tuileries, to ensure that there was some appropriate legal process for dealing with suspects accused of political crimes and treason, rather than arbitrary killing by local committees. The provisional Tribunal was abolished in November 1792 at the start of the trial of Louis XVI, and during this time had sentenced twenty-eight people to death. Mostly these were ordinary criminals rather than political prisoners.

It incorporated elements from the reformed criminal justice system of 1791 as well as features with a more 'extraordinary' or 'revolutionary' potential. A bench of five judges would be responsible for running the court itself, but the Convention would control the caseload through deputies elected to a commission de six. Cases would then be presented to the court by an accusateur public (public prosecutor) helped in his work by two deputies, and jurors would decide on the guilt or innocence of defendants. The judges would then invoke punishments in accordance with the 1791 Penal Code...

In early March, the War in the Vendée and the War of the Pyrenees began; the population of the Austrian Netherlands were in insurrection against the French invasion, causing an alarming situation. On the evening of 9 March, a crowd gathered outside the Convention, shouting threats and calling for the removal of all "traitorous" deputies who had failed to vote for the execution of the king. On 12 March 1793, a Tribunal criminel extraordinaire was established; three days later the Convention appointed Fouquier-Tinville as the "accusateur public" and Fleuriot-Lescot as his assistant. On 11 March, Dumouriez addressed the Brussels assembly, apologising for the actions of the French commissioners and soldiers. On 12 March, Dumouriez criticized the interference of officials of the War Ministry which employed many Jacobins. He attacked not only Pache, the former minister of war, but also Marat and Robespierre. Dumouriez had long been unable to agree with the course of the Convention. He was disenchanted with the radicalisation of the revolution and its politics and put an end to the annexation efforts.

The Revolutionary Tribunal was fully re-established in October at a time of crisis in the new French Republic. The War of the First Coalition was going badly. An unsatisfied Dumouriez wanted to restore a (constitutional) monarchy and reintroduce the French Constitution of 1791. The provisional government responded by taking a number of measures to defend the integrity of the Republic.

Even in these circumstances, the Convention was initially reluctant to restore the Revolutionary Tribunal. On 10 March, responding to serious disorder in the streets of Paris, Georges Danton, with Robespierre's support, proposed its revival, but the majority of deputés were not in favour. After a long debate, towards midnight, Danton was able to persuade a majority to vote for it only by raising the spectre of further uncontrolled massacres, as had taken place the previous September. If the Convention did not agree to create the Tribunal, he argued, the people would be compelled to make their own justice. "Let us be terrible," said Danton, "so that the people will not have to be." On this basis, the Convention finally agreed that there should be established in Paris the Extraordinary Criminal Tribunal (Tribunal criminel extraordinaire), which received the official name of the Revolutionary Tribunal by a decree of 29 October 1793.

Robespierre became a member of the Committee of General Defence to coordinate the war effort. Danton, Charles-Francois Delacroix, Beurnonville and several other deputies were sent to Belgium to question and arrest Dumouriez. Other measures taken in response to the crisis around the same time included the formal establishment of a Revolutionary Watch Committee in every neighbourhood and the creation of the Committee of Public Safety on 6 April 1793.

== Form ==
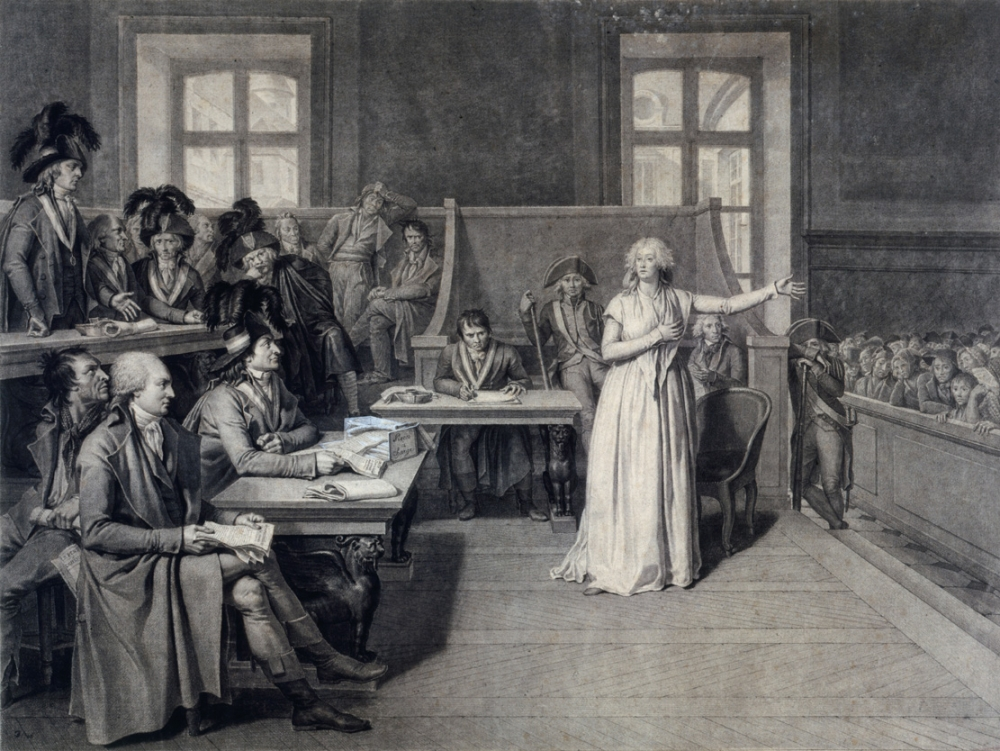
Trial of Marie Antoinette on 15 Oct 1793

The court was to hear cases of alleged counter-revolutionary offences from across France. It was composed of a jury of twelve. This was an innovation in French justice, borrowed from English law (although for the Revolutionary Tribunal the jury was carefully selected from politically reliable activists). It had five judges, a public prosecutor, and two deputy prosecutors, all nominated by the Convention; and from its judgements, there was no appeal. Jacques-Bernard-Marie Montané became President of the Tribunal until he was replaced in his post on 23 August 1793 by M. J. A. Herman. Fouquier-Tinville served as public prosecutor. The lists of prisoners to be sent before the tribunal were prepared by a popular commission and signed, after revision, by the Committee of General Security and the Committee of Public Safety jointly.

On 5 September 1793, the Convention split the Revolutionary Tribunal into four concurrent chambers so that the number of cases it dealt with could be greatly increased. It also decided that all jurors in the Tribunal should be directly appointed by the Committee of Public Safety or the Committee of General Security. This followed the news that rebels in Toulon had handed the city over to the British and several days of rioting in Paris.

== Operation ==
One of the earliest cases brought to the Tribunal led to its most famous acquittal. On 13 April 1793 Girondin deputés brought an accusation against Jean-Paul Marat. Crucially, this involved waiving the immunity enjoyed until then by members of the Convention (Marat was himself a deputé). Not only did the case against Marat collapse, but two days after his case was brought, members of the Paris Commune responded by bringing a case to the Tribunal against 22 leading Girondins. This case was dismissed, but the principle that Convention members could be tried by the Tribunal was an important one, and ultimately led to the Girondin leaders being tried and executed in October 1793.

During the months when Montané served as its President, the Tribunal dealt with 178 accused. 53% of these were set free after initial examination by a judge, without a full trial, while a further 17% were tried and acquitted by a jury. 5% were convicted and sentenced to imprisonment or deportation, and 25% were sentenced to death. From its formation up to September 1793, the Tribunal heard 260 cases and handed down 66 death penalties. As a result, it was criticized as ineffective by some Jacobins. The Law of Suspects (17 September 1793) greatly increased the number of prisoners who were imprisoned and might be brought to trial. Between October and the end of 1793 the Tribunal issued 177 death sentences.

Similar tribunaux révolutionnaires were also in operation in the various French departments. However, on 16 April 1794 (27 Germinal Year II) the Convention approved a report by Saint-Just proposing the abolition of the existing revolutionary tribunals in individual départements and requiring all suspects to be sent to the main tribunal in Paris, due to reports of corruption in the provincial tribunals. On 21 May 1794 the government decided that the judicial system would be centralized, with almost all the tribunals in the provinces closed and all the trials held in Paris. The provincial tribunals which were allowed to continue their work were Bordeaux, Arras, and Nîmes in the south, as well as Arras and Cambrai in the north.

Following the attempted assassinations of Convention members Jean-Marie Collot d'Herbois on 23 May and Maximilien Robespierre on 25 May 1794, on 10 June (22 Prairial Year II) the so-called "Prairial Laws" were passed. These limited trials in the Revolutionary Tribunal to three days. They also prevented the Revolutionary Tribunal from calling witnesses, or from allowing defense counsel. Juries were to convict or acquit entirely on the basis of the accusation and the accused's own defense. Further, the new laws confined the Tribunal to only two possible verdicts – acquittal or death. Finally, the law cancelled all previous legislation on the same subject. Without being explicit, this removed the immunity of members of the Convention which up till then had protected them from summary arrest and required that the Convention itself vote to send any of its members to trial.

Three days after the Prairial laws were passed, the guillotine was moved out of Paris. It had previously stood on the Place du Carrousel, was then moved to the Place de la Revolution, and then again to the Place St Antoine and later to the Place du Trône-Renversé. As the Revolutionary Tribunal accelerated the pace of executions in Paris, it became impractical to have it in the city.

== Criticism ==
The powers of the Revolutionary Tribunal were granted by the Convention, and there was only limited criticism of it. Royalists, émigrés and federalists were clearly opposed to the Tribunal and its workings, but since public criticism in support of the monarchy in Paris or in the press would be regarded as treasonable, it barely existed. At the same time, there were periodic demands from Enragés and Hébertists that the Tribunal accelerate its work and condemn more of the accused.

Among the first to speak up publicly against the Tribunal was Camille Desmoulins in his short-lived journal, "Le Vieux Cordelier". As a result of his criticisms he was expelled from the Jacobin Club. Later he was arrested, tried and executed together with Danton.

On the eve of his execution, Danton expressed his regret for having advocated the Tribunal. "It was just a year ago that I was the means of instituting the Revolutionary Tribunal; may God and man forgive me for what I did then; but it was not that it might become the scourge of humanity."

== After Thermidor ==
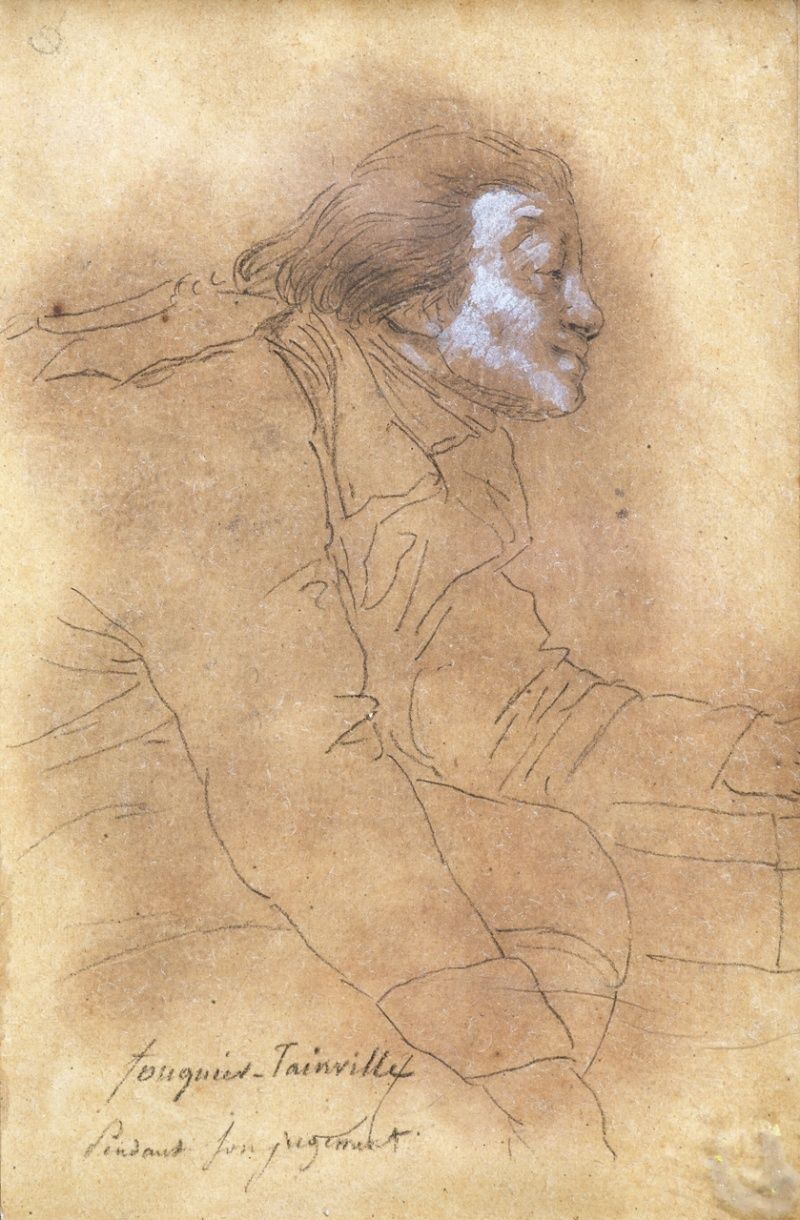
Sketch of Fouquier-Tinville made during his trial

After the coup of Thermidor in July 1794, some people expected the Revolutionary Tribunal to be abolished, but this did not happen. In the five days after the Thermidorian Reaction, the Convention freed 478 political prisoners, but 8,000 still remained incarcerated, despite popular demands for a general amnesty.

On 1 August 1794 (14 Thermidor Year II) the Prairial Laws were revoked, meaning that the burden of proof against suspects was once again with the prosecution. Soon afterwards, all of the judges on the Revolutionary Tribunal were replaced, and the local surveillance committees were curtailed, so that there were henceforth to be only twelve in Paris and one per district outside the capital. The Law on Suspects however remained in force.

The Revolutionary Tribunal was used by the Thermidorian Convention as an instrument to destroy the political leaders who had taken an active part in what was eventually called the Reign of Terror. On 16 December 1794 (26 Frimaire Year III) Jean-Baptiste Carrier was sentenced to death and executed. On 6 May 1795 (17 Floreal Year III), the former President of the Revolutionary Tribunal, Martial Herman, the former Chief Prosecutor Fouquier-Tinville and three former judges and six former jury members of the Revolutionary Tribunal were convicted, and the following day, guillotined. After most of those associated with the previous radical government had been eliminated, the Revolutionary Tribunal was finally discontinued on 31 May 1795 (12 Prairial Year III).

While the Convention itself had most people associated with the Revolutionary Tribunal in Paris executed, no similar official process was followed in the provinces. In 1795, the First White Terror broke out in parts of the country, particularly in the South East, as anti-Jacobin mobs attacked and murdered people who had been associated with revolutionary tribunals in their area. On 14 February 1795 for example, Joseph Fernex, who had served as a judge on the Tribunal in Orange, was killed and thrown into the Rhône by a mob. On 27 June other members of the same tribunal received the same treatment.

== Assessment ==
From the beginning of 1793 to the Thermidorian Reaction, around 17,000 people were sentenced and beheaded by some form of revolutionary court in France (in Paris or in the provinces), in addition to some 25,000 others who were summarily executed in the September Massacres, retributions in the War in the Vendée and elsewhere. The Paris Revolutionary Tribunal was responsible for 16% of all death sentences.

Of all those accused by the Revolutionary Tribunal, about half were acquitted (the number dropped to a quarter after the enactment of the Law of 22 Prairial Year II) (10 June 1794). Before 22 Prairial the Revolutionary Tribunal had pronounced 1,220 death sentences in thirteen months; during the forty-nine days between the passing of the law and the coup of Thermidor, 1,376 persons were condemned (an average of 28 per day).

== List of court presidents ==
1. Jacques-Bernard-Marie Montané 13 March 1793 to 23 August 1793
2. Martial Herman 28 August 1793 to 7 April 1794
3. René-François Dumas 8 April 1794 to 27 July 1794
4. Claude-Emmanuel Dobsen 28 July 1794 to 31 May 1795

== List of public prosecutors ==
1. Louis-Joseph Faure 13 March 1793 (rejected election)
2. Antoine Quentin Fouquier-Tinville 13 March 1793 to 1 August 1794
3. Michel-Joseph Leblois August 1794 to January 1795
4. Antoine Judicis January 1795 to 31 May 1795

== Sources ==
- Haydon, Colin; Doyle, William (2006). Robespierre. Cambridge University Press. ISBN 978-0521026055.
