= La Révolution française (film) =

- Release posters for Part I and Part II.
- Directed by: Robert Enrico (Part 1); Richard T. Heffron (Part 2)
- Screenplay by: David Ambrose; Daniel Boulanger
- Produced by: Denis Héroux; Enrico Manca; Alexandre Mnouchkine; Bodo Scriba
- Starring: Klaus Maria Brandauer; Andrzej Seweryn; Jean-François Balmer; Jane Seymour; Peter Ustinov; François Cluzet
- Cinematography: François Catonné; Bernard Zitzermann
- Edited by: Patricia Nény; Annie Baronnet; Martine Barraqué; Peter Hollywood
- Music by: Georges Delerue
- Production company: Les productions ALLIANCE
- Distributed by: Les Films Ariane
- Release date: 10 May 1989
- Running time: 360 minutes
- Countries: France; West Germany; Italy; Canada
- Languages: French; English; German
- Budget: FRF 300 million
- Box office: $4.8 million

La Révolution française is a two-part 1989 historical drama co-produced by France, Germany, Italy and Canada for the 200th anniversary of the French Revolution. The full film runs at 360 minutes, but the edited-for-television version is slightly longer. It purports to tell a faithful and neutral story of the Revolution, from the calling of the Estates-General to the fall of Maximilien Robespierre. The film had a large budget (FRF 300 million) and boasted an international cast. It was shot in French, German and English.

== Plot ==
Part I
La Révolution française: les Années lumière (The French Revolution: Years of Hope), directed by Robert Enrico

The first part focuses on the events of the early days of the French Revolution.

The Estates General of 1789 quickly falls apart as many members of the Third Estate swear an oath to continue assembling until they are given more rights. In response, King Louis XVI closes the assembly. In a private lunch following the incident, Marie Antoinette gives Louis a few ideas, such as using force should the people refuse the King's demands. Meanwhile, many orators rouse the people to demand for change.

Finance minister Jacques Necker, a friend and popular figure of the people, resigns and returns to Switzerland, which worsens the situation. On 12 July, Desmoulins speaks to a crowd to defend themselves against Swiss and German troops who would attack them, only for the gathering to be dispersed. When Desmoulins' friend and colleague Georges Danton hears the news, he delivers a fiery speech at Paris' Cordeliers Convent asking every man in the district to volunteer to fight and proclaiming that they will not allow tyranny to triumph over liberty.

On 14 July 1789, revolutionaries gather at the Bastille prison, seeking weapons and gunpowder for their revolutionary cause. A battle ensues between Revolutionary forces and the prison's garrison, headed by the Marquis de Launay, where the Revolutionaries emerge victorious after a bloody struggle and several tense negotiations. Launay is lynched and his head stuck on a pike, the revolutionaries dancing "La Carmagnole" around it in celebration.

Louis XVI arrives at Paris while the Marquis de Lafayette reads the Declaration of the Rights of Man and of the Citizen out to the National Assembly. In October, Versailles holds a welcoming banquet for Flanders Regiment officers after they arrive to defend the palace as a precaution, due to bread shortages agitating the populace. When word reaches Paris, Danton is enraged, and on 4 October, dictates a leaflet in the presence of Desmoulins to be printed and posted on the city walls, calling the banquet an insult to liberty, and calling for insurrection. The day after the missive is sent, thousands of women march to demand bread, and head towards Versailles. They are joined by more revolutionaries at Danton's encouragement.

The women storm the palace, overpowering the guards but stopping short of the King and Queen, protected by guards and soldiers. At the request of the people, Louis XVI appears on the balcony, followed by his wife, Marie Antoinette, to prove their loyalties. As the mob prepares to shoot her, she kneels down, pleading forgiveness, and the mob relents, shouting "God save the Queen!".

Afterward, Louis meets with inventor Joseph-Ignace Guillotin and works out the final design for a new device: the guillotine. Meanwhile, Danton starts his own political newspaper. A few days later, the Fête de la Fédération is held on the Champ de Mars. Some of those in the masses are Danton, Robespierre, and Mirabeau, who privately express discontent with the celebration. Lafayette and the people swear an oath of faith and loyalty to France, while King Louis swears fidelity to the Constitution and the people. Soon afterwards, a mutiny in the Nancy garrison is quickly put down, many being beaten publicly to death or hanged.

In a speech before the National Assembly, Danton demands the resignation of several government ministers. Soon afterwards, mob attacks on churches break out across France. Sacraments such as baptism are mocked, and organists are forced to play revolutionary music. Subsequently, Lafayette signs an edict demanding the arrest of all Revolutionaries in the National Assembly. Meanwhile, the royal family flees Paris, hoping to reach the Austrian Netherlands disguised as servants. However, they are identified by an innkeeper at Varennes, and returned to Paris. In response, orators call for the abolition of the monarchy.

The Mayor of Paris, Jean Sylvain Bailly, is forced to declare martial law after Danton and his supporters gather at the Champ de Mars. Initially dispersed by the National Guard, they return on 17 July 1791, gathering souvenirs, banners and flags. However, the National Guard also returns, and despite the soldiers firing a warning shot, the crowd refuses to disperse and begins to throw stones and other objects at the soldiers. Taking this as a sign of hostility, Bailly orders his troops to open fire, despite Lafayette's efforts to maintain peace between both sides. The resulting massacre is a bloodbath, with dozens dead or wounded.

A few weeks later, Louis XVI and the National Assembly declare war on the great powers of Europe. The Assembly is jubilant, but Robespierre foresees disaster. French troops march on the Belgian frontier, but are quickly annihilated by forces of Prussia and Austria. In the ensuing chaos, a French general is killed by his own soldiers. Responding to the defeats, Jean-Paul Marat demands that "ten thousand heads must fall here in France." The Duke of Brunswick issues a manifesto demanding that France surrender, or he will "burn Paris to the ground." The National Assembly calls for more troops, though Robespierre continues to be skeptical. While French soldiers make their way to the front, they are given provisions in the towns they enter, and discover a young boy singing a new tune. Intrigued, they ask him of its origins, and as they resume marching, they sing this new song: "La Marseillaise".

On 10 August, thousands of Revolutionaries surround the Tuileries Palace. Initially, the National Guard are ordered to defend the palace, but unwilling to fire upon their fellow brethren, they switch sides and point cannons at the palace. An armed standoff takes place, where Louis XVI, Marie Antoinette, and the rest of the nobility are escorted out of the Palace for refuge in the meeting place of the National Assembly, where the children watch the proceedings. Back at the Tuileries, the insurrectionists break through the Palace gates, and an intense firefight ensues between the Swiss Guards and the revolutionaries. Despite the Swiss Guards' best efforts, and heavy losses sustained by the Revolutionaries, the Palace is taken. Louis then tells his son that "there is no longer a King in France".

Part II
La Révolution française: les Années terribles (The French Revolution: Years of Rage), directed by Richard T. Heffron

The second part focuses on the aftermath of the 10 August Insurrection and the Reign of Terror.

Although the King has been deposed, the situation hasn't improved. As Prussian forces advance closer to Paris, desperate measures are taken by Danton and his associates. Death warrants are issued, and public agitation leads to the September Massacres. However, reprieve comes on 20 September, as French forces fight and emerge victorious over the Prussians at the Battle of Valmy. As 1793 comes, the National Convention decides on the fate of the King. Louis is brought to trial and sentenced to death. On 21 January, he is brought to the scaffold in a closed carriage. He attempts to make a speech to the crowd, but is drowned out by drums mid-speech. Amidst the ensuing jubilation, cannons herald the former King's death. Shortly afterwards, his own son, Louis Charles, is taken by soldiers to be tutored by a man named Citizen Simon.

Robespierre and Danton consider a new Revolutionary Tribunal as Marat is brought to trial for public agitation, though he is acquitted. At the bidding of the Paris Commune, armed citizens surround the Convention and drive out Brissot and his supporters. Soon after, a young woman named Charlotte Corday hears a speech criticizing and denouncing Marat, and decides to act. She enters Marat's room and stabs him whilst he is writing for a newspaper in his bathtub, killing him instantly. During Marat's funeral, Robespierre proposes new granaries for the starving populace.

On 15 October 1793, Marie Antoinette is escorted by her guards to the Revolutionary Tribunal for her trial. During the proceedings, she is accused of several crimes, among which is acts of debauchery committed between her and her son. Antoinette is then convicted, condemned to death, and executed the next day on October 16. Two weeks later, Brissot, too, is executed. Danton is remarried (after the death of his old wife a few months earlier), and later gives a speech in front of the Convention, questioning the direction of the Revolution and criticizing the actions of the people. He then demands that a "Committee of Clemency" be established to counteract this violence.

Hébert has great concern for Danton's enormous popularity and denounces him, first via newspaper, then later to a crowd, accusing him of treason and having betrayed the Revolution. Robespierre then appears and asks for a Committee to investigate Danton's career and integrity, and declares the accusations false and fraudulent, saving Danton's life in the process. Hébert incites his followers to insurrection, but the Committee of Public Safety unanimously votes for the arrest of Hébert. On charges of supporting counterrevolutionaries, he is arrested and later executed. Despite this, the Committed debates Danton's situation, seeing him as a potential threat, and elects to arrest him. Shortly before his arrest, he confides to Louis Legendre that he would come out of a trial not guilty.

Danton's ensuing trial is chaotic: the gallery is flooded with his supporters who constantly interrupt the proceedings, and on several occasions blatant miscarriages of justice are performed just to move things along. Blatantly inauthentic letters and testimonials are also used, one of which claims a plot by Danton and his associates to restore the monarchy. The next day, the evidence is presented, and Danton is found guilty. As the defendants are led out of the courtroom, Legendre leads the people in singing the Marseillaise. At the scaffold, Danton asks Sanson to display his head to the people, to which the executioner complies.

Robespierre holds the Festival of the Supreme Being on 8 June 1794, which does little to help his already-fragile situation. Aside from men like Saint-Just and Couthon, the Committee stands against Robespierre, declaring that he has gone too far, and decide to put an end to him. At the Convention, Robespierre attempts to justify himself by presenting his situation from his perspective, and claims a conspiracy against the Republic, which includes many members of the Convention. After Robespierre refuses to name the accused, the meeting turns violent as he is dragged around by the members, who call him a tyrant and call for his death. Once Robespierre leaves, the Convention unanimously votes for his and his associates' arrests and immediate executions.

Robespierre and his supporters take refuge in the Hôtel de Ville, Paris and organize a defense of the building. The Convention musters a large force to storm the building and take Robespierre prisoner, whilst Robespierre's followers barricade themselves in the building. A cannon brings down the barricaded door, and a brief skirmish ensues between the National Guard and Robespierre's supporters. The doors to the main room are broken down and a large scuffle ensues, with Robespierre himself accidentally shooting himself in the jaw after being tackled to the floor. Robespierre and his supporters are all arrested and await execution. The next day, Robespierre, Saint-Just, and other prominent Robespierrists are taken to the Place de la Révolution and guillotined, effectively marking the end of the Reign of Terror.

== Cast ==
- Klaus Maria Brandauer as Georges Danton
- Andrzej Seweryn as Maximilien Robespierre
- Jean-François Balmer as King Louis XVI of France
- Jane Seymour as Queen Marie-Antoinette
- Peter Ustinov as Comte de Mirabeau
- François Cluzet as Camille Desmoulins
- Marianne Basler as Antoinette Gabrielle Danton
- Marie Bunel as Lucile Desmoulins
- Vittorio Mezzogiorno as Jean-Paul Marat
- Claudia Cardinale as Gabrielle de Polastron, duchesse de Polignac
- Sam Neill as Gilbert du Motier, marquis de La Fayette
- Christopher Thompson as Louis Antoine de Saint-Just
- Raymond Gérôme as Jacques Necker
- Christopher Lee as Charles Henri Sanson
- Philippine Leroy-Beaulieu as Charlotte Corday
- Jean-François Stévenin as Louis Legendre
- Marc de Jonge as Antoine Joseph Santerre
- Michel Duchaussoy as Jean Sylvain Bailly
- Henri Serre as Marquis de Launay, Governor of the Bastille
- Richard De Burnchurch as Henry Essex Edgeworth
- Serge Dupire as Billaud-Varenne
- Ronald Guttman as Herman
- Yves Beneyton as Fouquier-Tinville
- Michel Subor as Vadier
- Jean Bouise as Maurice Duplay
- Dominique Pinon as Jean-Baptiste Drouet
- Gabrielle Lazure as Marie Thérèse Louise of Savoie-Carignan, Princess of Lamballe
- Jean-Pierre Laurent as François Hanriot
- Yves-Marie Maurin as François Alexandre Frédéric de La Rochefoucauld, Duke of La Rochefoucauld
- Hanns Zischler as Johann Wolfgang von Goethe
- Michel Galabru as Abbot Jean-Sifrein Maury
- Massimo Girotti as The Pope's envoy
- François-Éric Gendron as Bertrand Barère
- Georges Corraface as Jacques-René Hébert
- Edgar Givry as Jean-Baptiste Cléry
- Michel Melki as Jacques-Alexis Thuriot de la Rosière
- Jean-Yves Berteloot as Count Axel von Fersen
- François Levantal as Romeuf
- Liliane Rovère as a Woman

== Production ==
Production took three years, and cost around $50,000,000 (equivalent to $129,865,772 in 2025) with the extensive support of the French government, making it the most expensive French film at the time.

== Reception ==
The film is generally considered by historians as historically accurate. Among the few departures from the historical facts, executioner Charles-Henri Sanson was shown executing both Louis XVI and Marie Antoinette. The elder Sanson actually executed only Louis XVI; it was his son who executed Marie-Antoinette, however Charles-Henri Sanson did attend the execution.

Some critics pointed out, however, that it suffered from its neutrality, which resulted in a lack of point of view and some incoherence. The first part, which dealt with a complex historical subject, was also criticized for disjointed pacing. The second part was considered by audiences and critics more gripping and dramatic. Balmer received great praise from critics and audiences for his portrayal of a rather sympathetic Louis XVI, and Seweryn was considered very convincing as Robespierre.

Despite critical success, the film was not commercially successful in France.

== See also ==
- List of longest films
