= Julien of Toulouse =

Political figure in the French Revolution

Jean Julien known as Julien of Toulouse (1750 in Saint-Laurent-d'Aigouze – 1828) was a deputy to the National Convention and a political figure in the French Revolution.

== Life ==
A Protestant minister in Toulouse at the outbreak of the Revolution, in September 1792 Julien was elected as deputy for the département of Haute-Garonne at the National Convention which voted for the death of Louis XVI. He was next sent on a mission to Orléans and the Vendée, in which he acted as a committed Montagnard, before becoming a member of the Committee of General Security, in which he was put in charge of a report on the rebel and federalist administrators who resisted the events of 31 May. Due to this report Robespierre accused him of being a feuillant and counter-revolutionary, but Julien retracted his report and assured him he had been deceived.

Orders were then put out for his arrest for fraud or trafficking his opinions and speculating in financial companies with Chabot, Basire and Delaunay, but he managed to evade arrest though designated a foreign agent and outlaw. After 9 Thermidor and Robespierre's fall, he appealed against his proscription, which he attributed to his hatred for Robespierre. On Marec's suggestion (full of praise for Julien), the Convention revoked his status as an outlaw but did not allow him to re-enter the legislative assembly. Included in the proscription of 18 Brumaire, he was momentarily arrested and condemned to deportation, but this measure was not carried out and Julien went back to obscurity, from which he would never return. Forced to leave France in 1816 after the Bourbon Restoration, he was unable to remain in Switzerland and so took refuge in Turin.

== Sources ==
- Alphonse de Beauchamp, Biographie moderne, Paris, Leroux, 1816, p. 175-6.
