= Louis-Pierre Deseine =

French sculptor (1749–1822)

- Born: 20 July 1749; Paris, Kingdom of France
- Died: 11 October 1822 (aged 73); Paris, Kingdom of France
- Resting place: Montparnasse Cemetery
- Occupation: Sculptor
- Relatives: Claude André Deseine (brother)

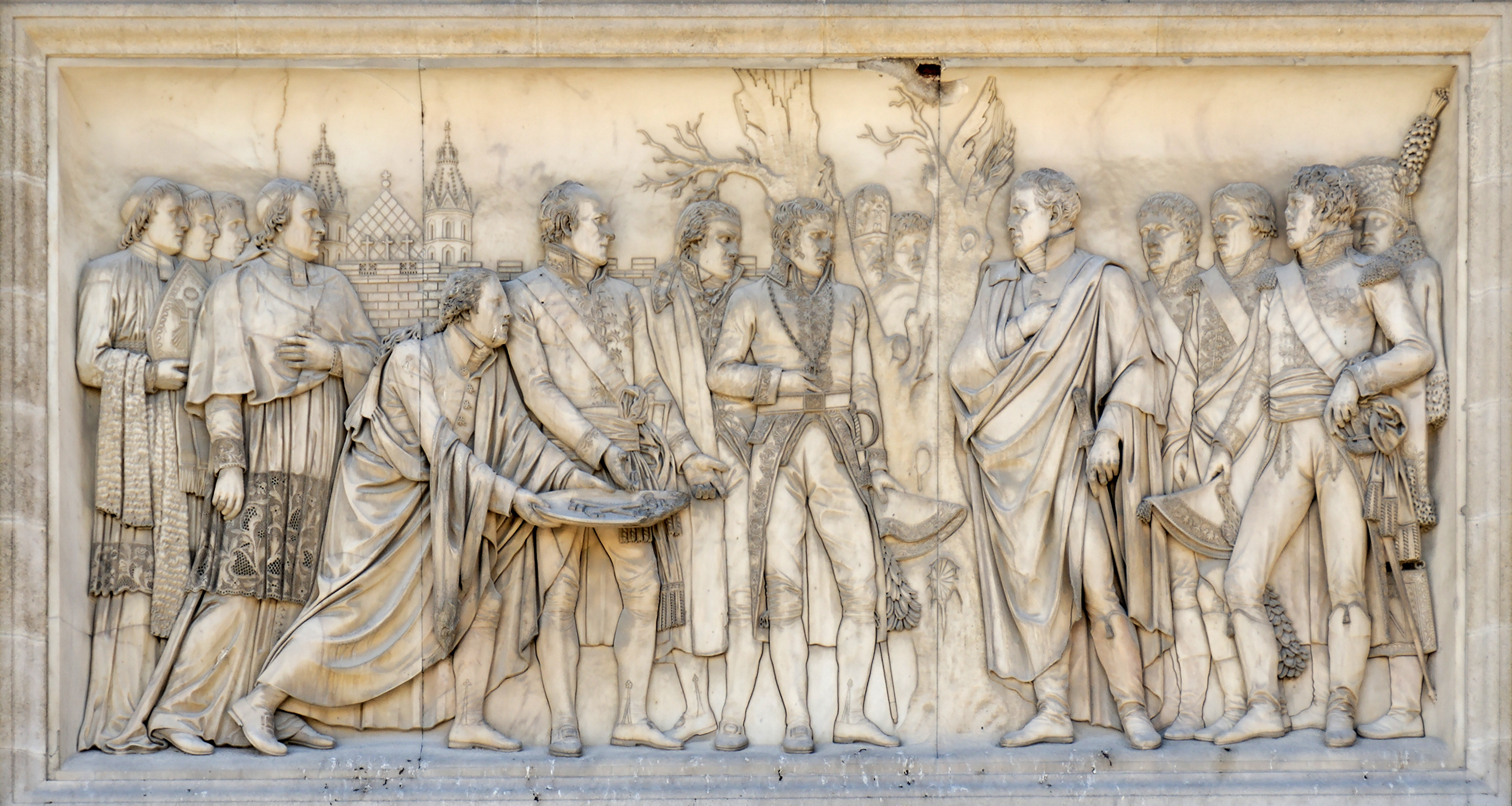
Entry to Vienna, bas-relief at the Arc de Triomphe du Carrousel, Paris

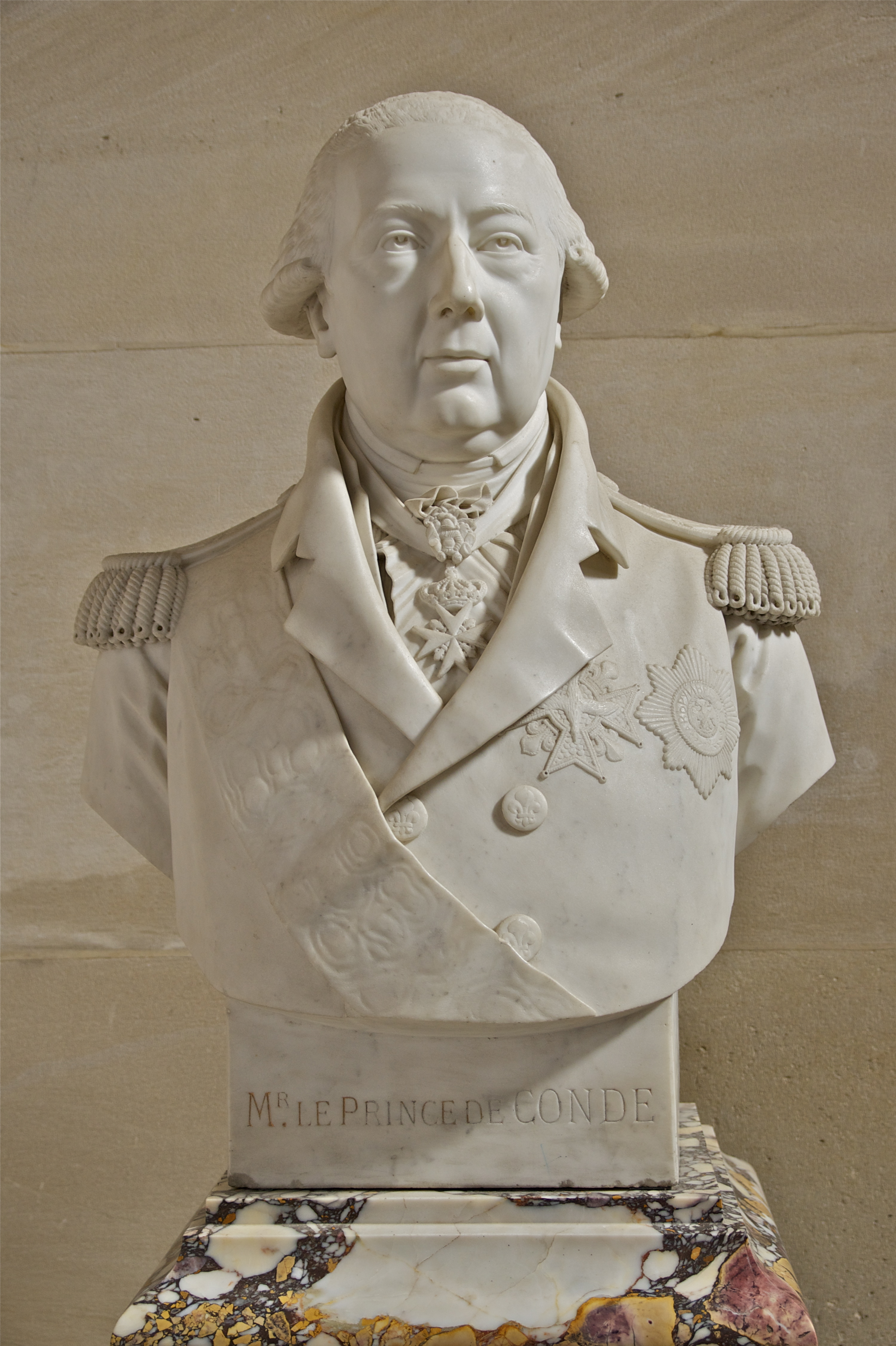
Louis Joseph, Prince of Condé, bust, 1814, (Château de Chantilly).

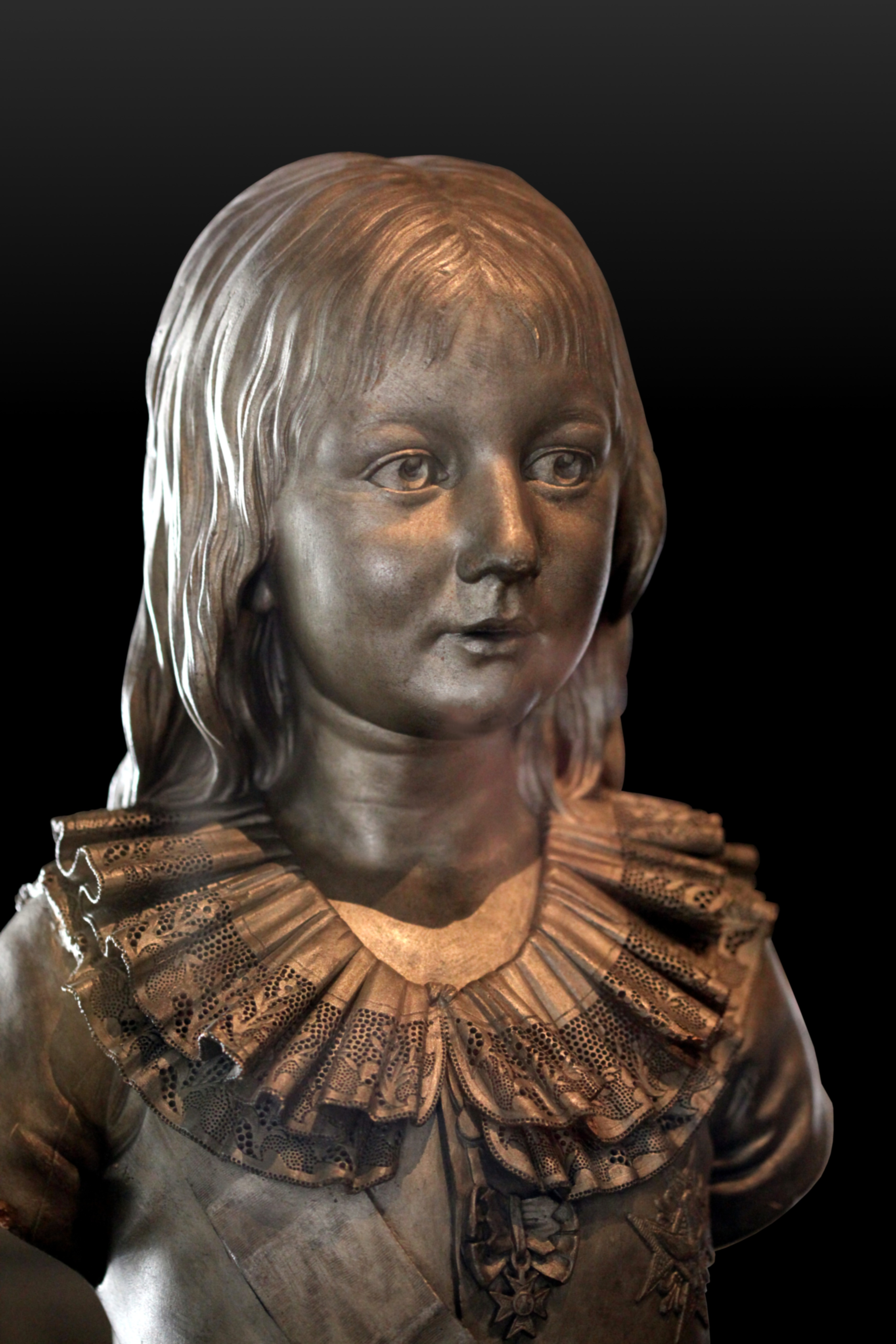
Bust of the dauphin Louis-Charles of France, (Musée de la Révolution française).

Louis-Pierre Deseine (20 July 1749 – 11 October 1822) was a French sculptor, who was born and died in Paris. He is known above all for his portrait busts and imaginary portraits.

== Early life ==
Deseine was born on 20 July 1749 in Paris to Louis-André Deseine and Madeleine Potier. He was the younger brother of the sculptor Claude André Deseine.

== Career ==
Deseine trained in several ateliers, notably with Augustin Pajou, whose portrait bust he exhibited at the Salon of 1785. He won a first prize from the Académie, which sent him to study further in Rome (1781–84).

At the Salon of 1789, he showed a portrait head of Belisarius.

In 1814 he published a history of the Académie royale de peinture et de sculpture, of which he had been a member. He described himself in 1814 as a member of the academies of Copenhagen and of Bordeaux, and as holding the post of first sculptor to the prince de Condé, for whom he had executed statues in the 1780s for the dining room at Chantilly, where some drawings and maquettes are preserved.

== Death ==
He died on 11 October 1822 in Paris and is buried in the Montparnasse Cemetery.

== Works ==
- Portrait bust of Augustin Pajou (1785), terracotta, Paris, musée du Louvre
- Portrait bust of Claude-Pierre-Louis Durand at the age of four (1788), plaster, Paris, musée du Louvre
- Portrait bust of Louis XVI (1790), marble, Versailles
- Portrait bust of Louis XVII (1790), marble, Versailles
- Mucius Scaevola (1791), marble, Paris, musée du Louvre. This was his morceau de reception when he became an Academician
- Portrait bust of Charles VIII (1799), terracotta, Paris, école nationale supérieure des Beaux-Arts
- Portrait d'Abélard (1801), plaster bust in a stone medallion, Paris, École nationale supérieure des Beaux-Arts
- Portrait bust of Pope Pius VII (1805, shown at the Salon of 1806), plaster, tinted to resemble terracotta, Rueil-Malmaison, château de Malmaison
- Portrait bust of Pierre-Nicolas de Fontenay, sénateur (1743–1806) (1807), marble, Versailles
- Portrait bust of the duc de Luynes, pair de France, plaster, (1808, signed) sold, Château de Belle Eglise, 5 June 2006, lot 306
- Portrait bust of Jean-Baptiste Bessières, duc d'Istrie, maréchal de France (1813), plaster patinated bronze, île d'Aix, musées de l'île d'Aix
- Portrait bust of Louis-Antoine-Henri de Bourbon, duc d'Enghien (1817), plaster, Chantilly, musée Condé. The monument was finished after his death by his nephew.
- Portrait bust of Louis XVIII, (1817), Chantilly, musée Condé
- Maquette for the monument of the duc d'Enghien at Vincennes (1817), plaster over wood, Chantilly, musée Condé
- Maquette for the monument of the Cardinal de Belloy, plaster, (c 1819) musée du Louvre. The monument to Cardinal de Belloy was erected in Notre-Dame de Paris, 1819

=== Not dated ===
- Two Nymphs supporting a putto, terracotta, inscribed, sold Sotheby's Arcade, 22 July 1993, lot 292
- Terracotta maquette, Virgin and Child (sold Bonham's London, 9 May 1996, lot 7
- The Entry at Vienna, bas-relief on the Arc de Triomphe du Carrousel, Paris
- Portrait bust of Jean-Joachim Winckelmann, tinted plaster, musée de Versailles,
- Comte Jean-Étienne-Marie Portalis, over lifesize statue, marble, Versailles

== Drawings ==
Drawings by Deseine are at the musée du Louvre ("Étude d'un homme debout avec une draperie sur l'épaule") and the musée Condé, Chantilly ("Le Déluge", "Deux Romains saluant un empereur assis" and "Lars Porsenna"); the musée Condé also conserves two projects for the monument to the duc d'Enghien.

== Sources ==
- Emmanuel Schwartz, Les Sculptures de l'École des Beaux-Arts de Paris. Histoire, doctrines, catalogue, (École nationale supérieure des Beaux-Arts, Paris) 2003.
