= Georges Danton =

French revolutionary (1759–1794)

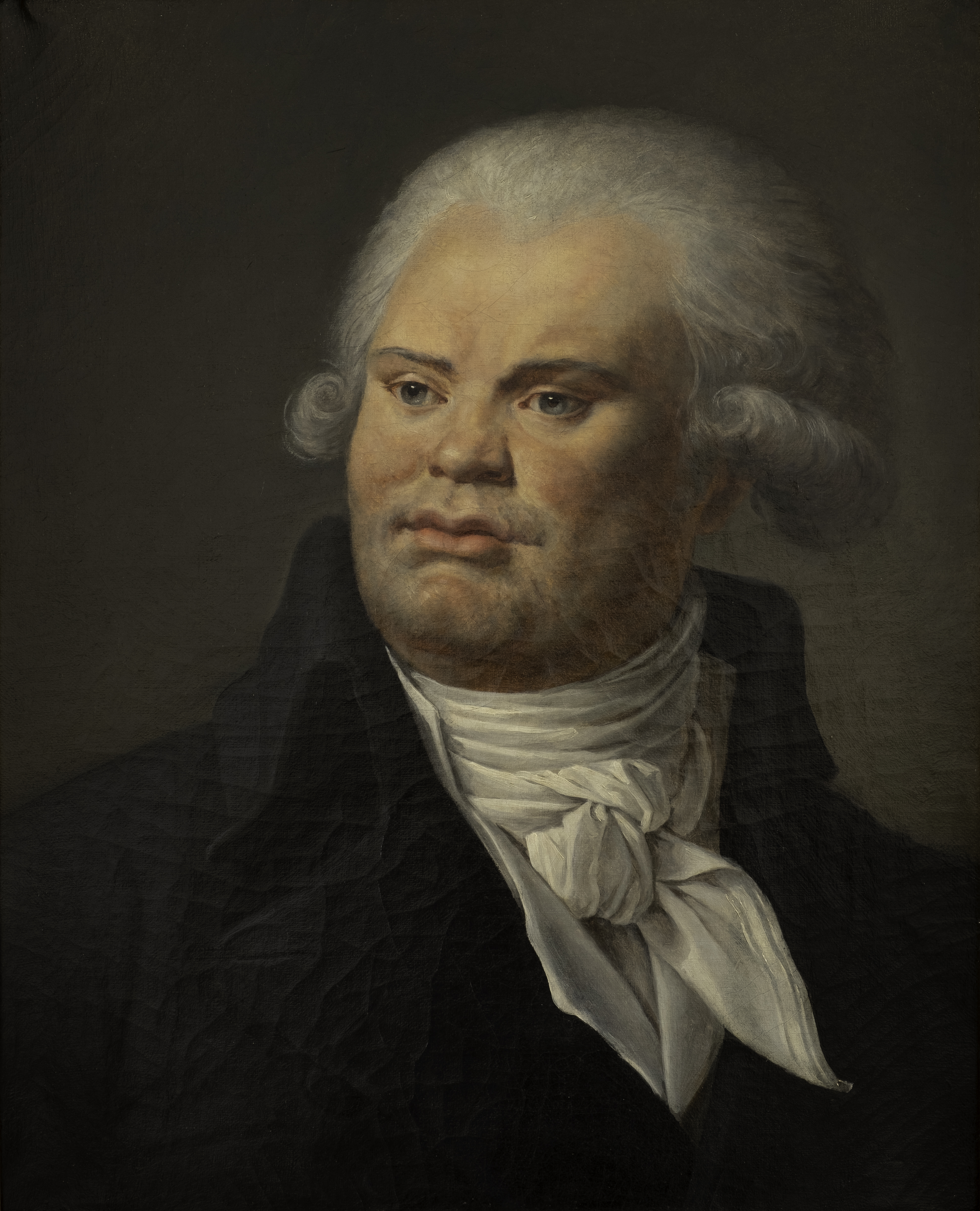
- Georges Jacques Danton. Musée Carnavalet, Paris

Member of the Committee of Public Safety
- In office 6 April 1793 – 10 July 1793
- Preceded by: Office created

Minister of Justice
- In office 10 August 1792 – 9 October 1792
- Preceded by: Étienne Dejoly
- Succeeded by: Dominique Joseph Garat

23rd President of the National Convention
- In office 25 July 1793 – 8 August 1793
- Preceded by: Jean Bon Saint-André
- Succeeded by: Marie-Jean Hérault de Séchelles

Deputy in the National Convention
- In office 20 September 1792 – 5 April 1794
- Constituency: Seine

Personal details
- Born: 26 October 1759 Arcis-sur-Aube, Kingdom of France
- Died: 5 April 1794 (aged 34) Paris, French First Republic
- Cause of death: Execution by guillotine
- Party: The Mountain (1792–1794)
- Other political affiliations: Jacobin Club (1789–1794); Cordeliers Club (1790–1794); Indulgents (1793–1794)
- Spouses: Antoinette Gabrielle Charpentier (m. 1787; died 1793) Louise Sébastienne Gély (m. 1793)
- Children: 3
- Parent(s): Jacques Danton; Mary Camus
- Occupation: Lawyer, politician
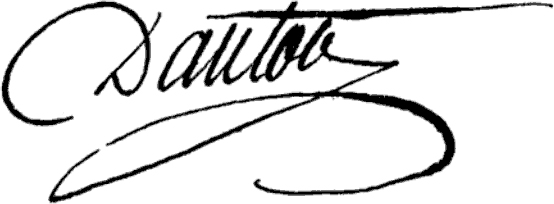
- Signature

Georges Jacques Danton (/ˈdæntən/, US: also /dɑːnˈtɒ̃/; French: [ʒɔʁʒ dɑ̃tɔ̃]; 26 October 1759 – 5 April 1794) was a French politician and one of the leading figures of the French Revolution. A relatively obscure lawyer before the Revolution, he became a prominent orator of the Cordeliers Club and, following the overthrow of the monarchy on 10 August 1792, was appointed Minister of Justice. His role in the September Massacres has long been disputed. In early 1793, the National Convention sent him to Belgium in connection with the military and political crisis surrounding General Dumouriez. That spring, Danton supported the establishment of the Revolutionary Tribunal and helped establish the Committee of Public Safety, of which he became one of the first members.

During the Insurrection of 31 May – 2 June 1793, Danton supported the dissolution of the Commission of Twelve, while taking a more ambivalent position toward the use of force against the Girondins. After leaving the Committee of Public Safety in July 1793, Danton increasingly distanced himself from its policies and in September refused to rejoin it. In early October 1793, Danton withdrew from political life for a time, but returned to Paris mid-November and emerged as one of the leading moderates calling for greater clemency and end to the Terror. His criticism of the Committee of Public Safety brought him into growing conflict with its members. On 25 December 1793 (5 Nivôse, year II), Robespierre responded publicly to demands associated with Danton and his allies for greater clemency. In late March 1794, Danton again spoke in favour of ending the Terror. Within days he was arrested, tried on charges of conspiracy and venality, and executed by guillotine on 5 April 1794.

Danton's political role and historical reputation have long been subjects of debate. During the Third Republic (1870–1940), he was often portrayed as a central figure in the overthrow of the monarchy and the establishment of the First Republic.

== Early life ==
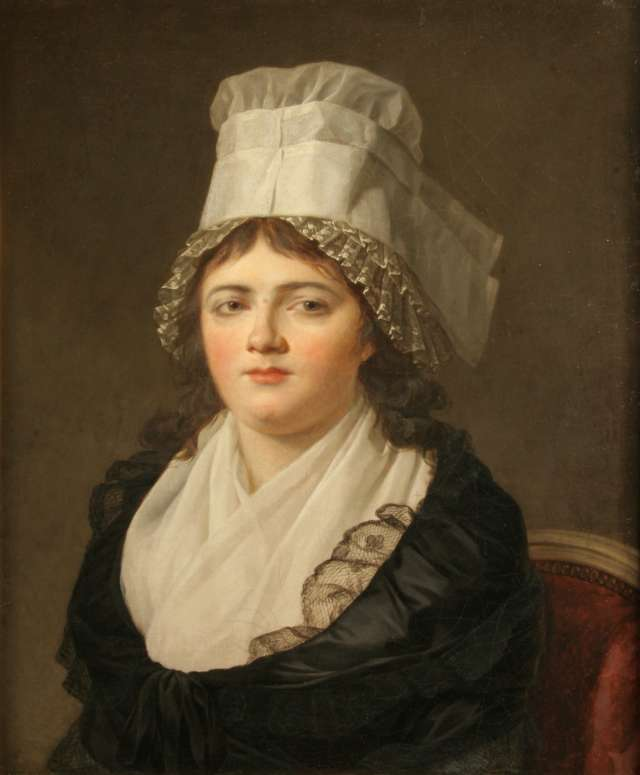
Antoinette Gabrielle Charpentier, wife of Danton

Danton was born in Arcis-sur-Aube (Champagne in northeastern France) to Jacques Danton, a respectable, but not wealthy lawyer, and Madeleine Camus. He was cousin to Georges Nicolas Jeannet-Oudin and Louis-François Jeannet.

As a baby, he was attacked by a bull and a few years later, came down with a bout of smallpox which resulted in the disfigurement and scarring of his face. He initially attended the school in Sézanne, but at the age of thirteen he left his parents' home to enter the seminary in Troyes before making a transition to a boarding school in the same area. While attending school, his classmate and friend Jules-François Paré was to have his hands rapped as punishment, but Danton defended his friend and spoke out against corporal punishment in class. Danton spoke so persuasively that the head of the school decided to ban the practice. In 1780, he settled in Paris, where he became a clerk under the Barrister Maître Vinot. In 1783, he passed the Barrister examination in Reims, and in 1787 he became a Conseil du Roi, or prosecutor. He began to frequent a cafe known as the Parnasse, which is where he met Antoinette Gabrielle Charpentier, whom he would marry on 14 June 1787 at the church of Saint-Germain-l'Auxerrois. The couple lived in a six-room apartment in the heart of the Left Bank (near the Café Procope), and had three sons:

- François, born in May 1788, died in infancy on 24 April 1789.
- Antoine, born on 18 June 1790, died on 14 June 1858.
- François Georges, born on 2 February 1792, died on 18 June 1848.

== Revolution ==
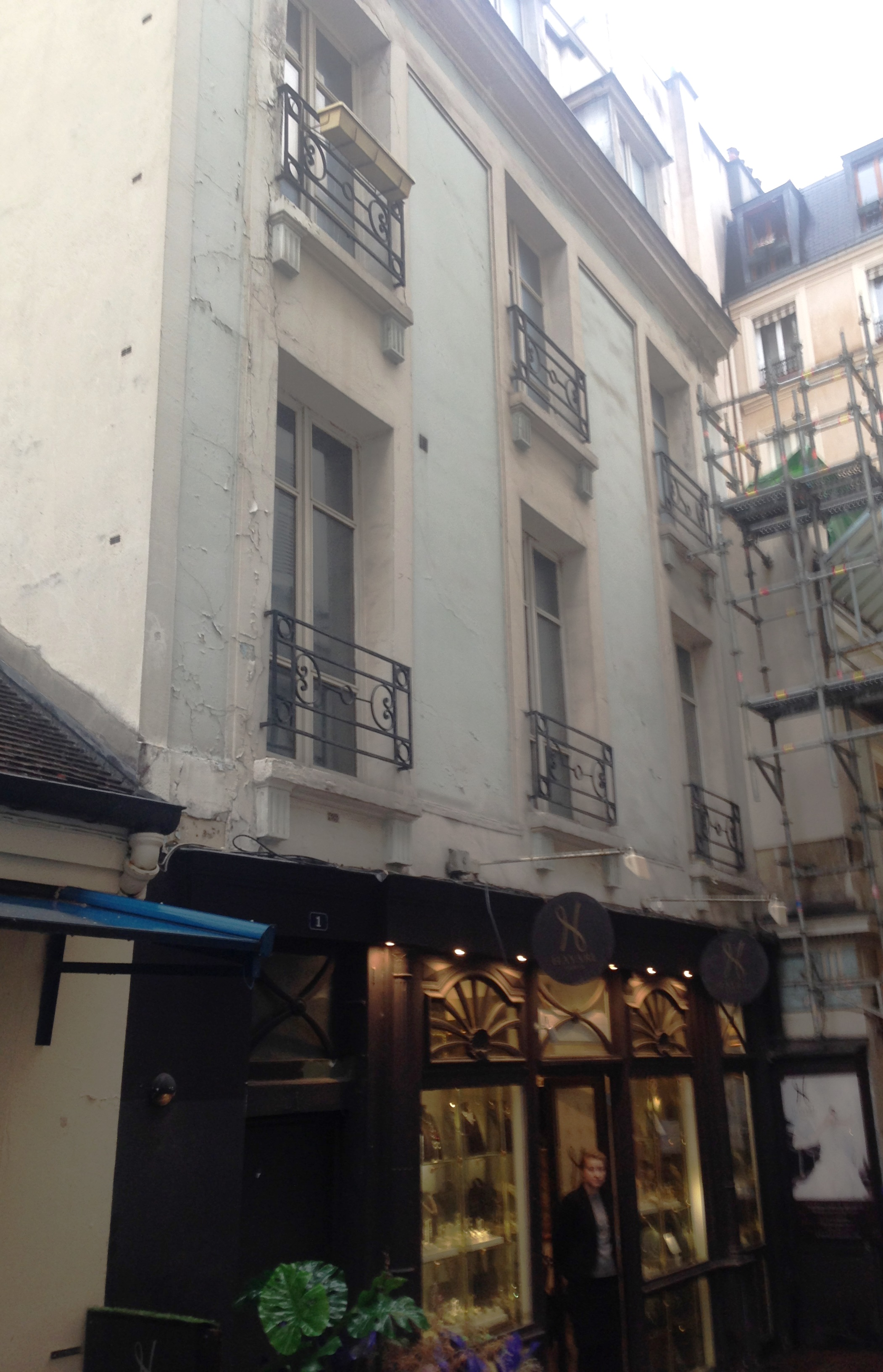
The historic Cour du Commerce Saint-Andre in the 6th arrondissement of Paris, France. The house at No. 1 was where Georges Danton lived when he was the District President.

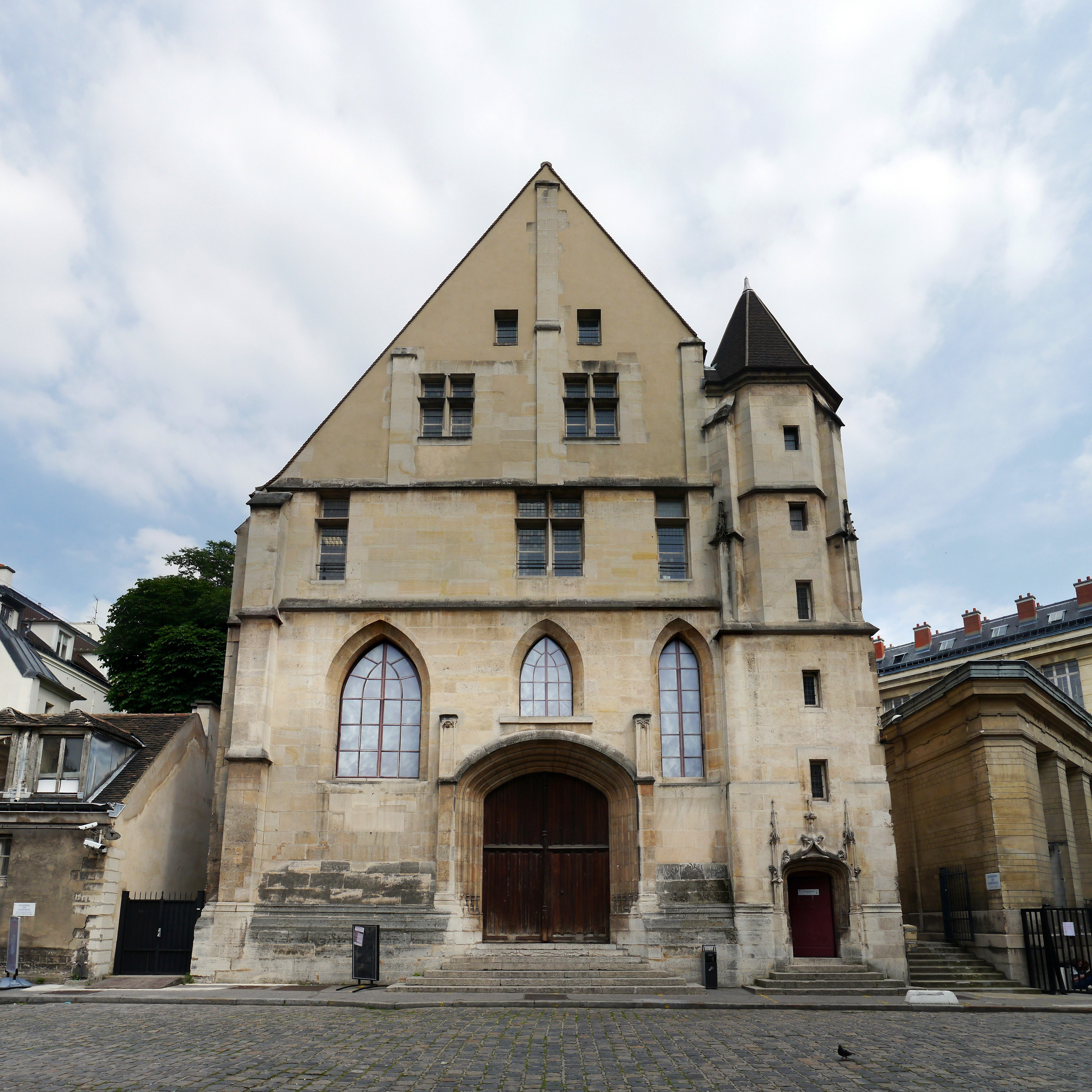
Cordeliers university library, front view (formerly Cordeliers Convent)

In the spring of 1789, Danton found his revolutionary beginnings as one of the many people giving speeches to the crowds gathered in the Palais Royal. His demanding voice and rhetorical skill quickly gained him fame, as well as his nickname of "The Thunderer". As the Cordeliers district Danton resided in grew more persistent in its revolutionary ideals, it eventually formed its own street militia that was involved in the storming of the Bastille on 14 July 1789. Danton himself was not present for the event, however, he soon after led the Cordeliers militia, as well as other revolutionaries, on a mission to retake the Bastille from its provisional governor, which gained him more popular support from the revolutionaries. He and his district opposed the Marquis de LaFayette, the commander of the National Guard, as well as Jean Sylvain Bailly, the provisional mayor. In early October, he was elected president of his section (around the Cordeliers Convent) and deputy to the Commune and wrote the poster for the Cordeliers which called Parisians to arms.

His home in the Rue des Cordeliers was open to many people from the neighborhood. Danton, Desmoulins, and Marat, who lived nearby, frequented the Café Procope and the political clubs of the district. In January 1790, the district of the Cordeliers resisted attempts to execute an arrest warrant against Marat, and Danton became involved in the resulting confrontation with the authorities. He was subsequently himself subjected to legal proceedings by the Grand Châtelet. Later in 1790, Paris's sixty districts were replaced by forty-eight sections. The reorganization ended Danton's position in the district administration, although he remained active in the new Section du Théâtre-Français.

On 27 April 1790, he became president of the Club de Cordeliers. On 2 August, Bailly became Paris' first elected mayor; Danton had 49 votes, Marat and Louis XVI only one each. In spring 1791, Danton suddenly began investing in property, in or near his birthplace, on a large scale.

Robespierre, Pétion, Danton, and Brissot were prominent figures at the Jacobin Club. On 15 July 1791, Danton and Brissot were among five members appointed to draft a petition opposing the restoration of Louis XVI. The petition was read at the Champ de Mars on 16 July, but the following day the Jacobins withdrew their support after the National Assembly had confirmed the king's constitutional position. Robespierre had urged caution, fearing that the petition would provide a pretext for repression.

After the Champ de Mars massacre on 17 July, the authorities launched a crackdown on radical political societies and journalists. Danton left Paris and subsequently spent several weeks in England, while Jean-Paul Marat's printing presses were seized and he went into hiding. Robespierre, who remained a deputy of the National Assembly, found refuge at the home of Maurice Duplay.

After the amnesty voted in the Assembly on 13 September 1791, Danton returned to Paris. He sought election to the new Legislative Assembly, but the opposition of the moderates in the electoral assembly of Paris led to his defeat. In December 1791, during the partial renewal of the municipality, there was significant abstention. This led to the defeat of LaFayette and the resignation of Bailly, which revealed the decline of the "constitutional" party which had until then dominated the Hôtel de Ville. Danton was elected second deputy procureur public of the Commune. The debate at the beginning of December 1791 on whether to go to war with neighboring powers opposing the Revolution, triggered conflict between Jacobins and led to the birth of the opposition between Montagnards and Girondins. Danton hesitated on the need for war. He leaned more towards Robespierre than the pro-war Brissot, but, overall, limited his participation in the dispute.

=== 1792 ===
On 9 August 1792, Danton returned from Arcis. In the evening before the storming of the Tuileries, he was visited by Desmoulins, his wife, and Fréron. After dinner, he went to the Cordeliers and preferred to go to bed early. It seems he went to the Maison-Commune after midnight. Faced with the insurrectionary Commune which relied on the insurgent sections and which held Paris, the Legislative Assembly had no choice but to suspend Louis XVI and replace him with a provisional Executive Council of six members composed of former Girondin ministers (Roland in the Interior, Servan in the War, Clavière in Finance, Monge in the Navy and Lebrun in Foreign Affairs). The Girondins, hostile to revolutionary Paris, needed a popular man committed to the insurgents to liaise with the insurrectional Commune and had Danton appointed to Minister of Justice the next day; he appointed Fabre and Desmoulins as his secretaries. More than a hundred decisions left the department within eight days. On 14 August, Danton invited Robespierre to join the Council of Justice, which Robespierre declined to do.

Danton seems to have dined almost every day at the Rolands'. On 28 August, the Assembly ordered a curfew for the next two days. At the behest of Danton, thirty commissioners from the sections were ordered to search in every suspect house for weapons, munition, swords, carriages and horses. By 2 September, between 520 and 1,000 people were taken into custody on the flimsiest of warrants. The exact number of those arrested will never be known.

On Sunday 2 September, at about 13:00, Danton, as a member of the provisional government, delivered a speech in the assembly: "We ask that anyone refusing to give personal service or to furnish arms shall be punished with death". "The tocsin we are about to ring is not an alarm signal; it sounds the charge on the enemies of our country." He continued after the applause: "To conquer them we must dare, dare again, always dare, and France is saved!". His speech acted as a call for direct action among the citizens, as well as a strike against the external enemy. Many believe this speech was responsible for inciting the September Massacres. It is estimated that around 1,100–1,600 people were murdered. Madame Roland held Danton responsible for their deaths. Danton was also accused by the French historians Adolphe Thiers, Alphonse de Lamartine, Jules Michelet, Louis Blanc and Edgar Quinet. However, according to Albert Soboul, there is no proof that the massacres were organized by Danton or by anyone else, though it is certain that he did nothing to stop them.

He did intervene, however, in protecting Roland and Brissot from an arrest warrant from the Supervisory Committee of the Commune on 4 September, opposing Marat by having the mandates removed, and was complicit in the escape of Adrien Duport, Talleyrand, and Charles de Lameth. On 6 September, he was elected by his section, "Théâtre Français", to be a deputy for the convention, gathering on 22 September. Danton remained a member of the ministry, although holding both positions simultaneously was illegal. Danton, Robespierre, and Marat were accused of forming a triumvirate. On 26 September, Danton was forced to give up his position in the government; he stepped down on 9 October.

At the new National Convention on 4 October 1792, Danton proposed to declare that the fatherland was no longer in danger, asking only to renounce extreme measures. He measured the risks posed to the Revolution by fratricidal quarrels between Republicans. He preached conciliation and calls the Assembly several times to "holy harmony". "It was in vain that we complained to Danton about the Girondine faction", wrote Robespierre, "he maintained that there was no faction there and that everything was the result of vanity and personal animosities". But the attacks from the Girondins concentrated on him, Marat and Robespierre—the "triumvirs"—accused of aspiring to dictatorship. Danton defends Robespierre at the end of October by declaring that "all those who talk about the Robespierre faction are, in my eyes, either prejudiced men or bad citizens", but dissociates himself from Marat by pronouncing "I don't like the individual Marat. I say frankly that I have experiences his temperament: he is volcanic, cantankerous and unsociable." The Girondins attacked Danton for his management of the secret funds of the Ministry of Justice. Roland, Minister of the Interior, scrupulously gave his accounts but Danton would not. Harassed by Brissot, he only escaped through weariness of the convention and for months the Girondins shouted "And the accounts?" to interrupt him at the podium. Meanwhile, his influence began to decline in favor of Robespierre as the real leader of the Mountain.

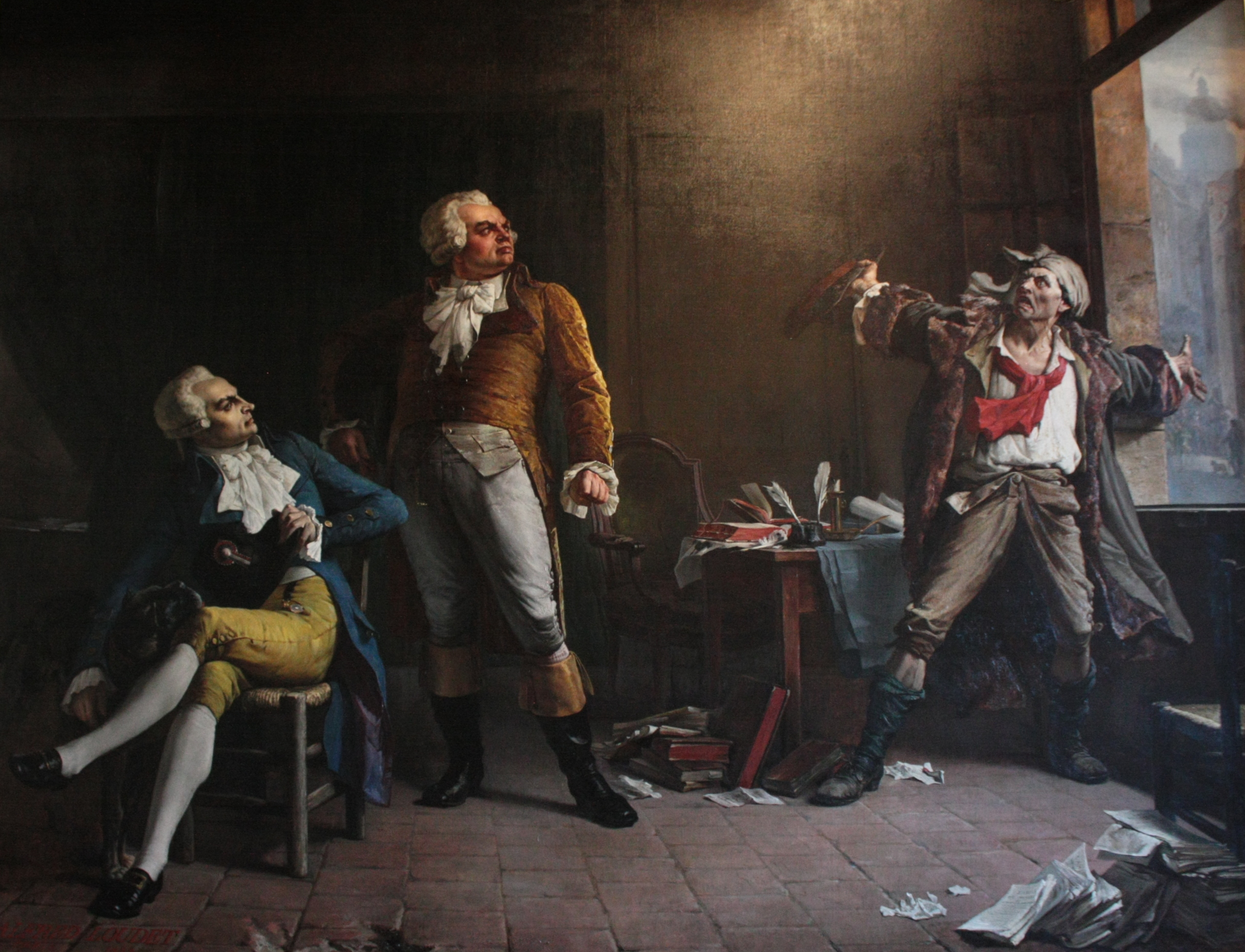
Imaginary meeting between Robespierre, Danton and Marat (illustrating Victor Hugo's novel Ninety-Three ) by Alfred Loudet

=== 1793 ===
On 10 February 1793, while Danton was on a mission in Belgium, his wife died while giving birth to their fourth child, who also died. Robespierre sent Danton a message. Danton was so affected by their deaths that he recruited the sculptor Claude André Deseine and, a week after Charpentier's death, brought him to Sainte-Catherine cemetery to exhume her body and execute a plaster bust of her appearance.

On 10 March, Danton supported the foundation of a Revolutionary Tribunal. He proposed the release of all imprisoned debtors as conscripts in the army. On 6 April, the Committee of Public Safety, which was then composed of only nine members, was installed on the proposal of Maximin Isnard, who was supported by Georges Danton. Danton was appointed a member of the committee. He and other members of the committee, despite its primary charge of defeating invasion and internal rebellions, were advocates of the moderation necessary to minimize popular resistance to military requisitions. Due to military reversals in 1793, many – especially among the sans-culottes – criticized its conduct, and subsequent committee membership included more radical thinkers who pressed for more extreme measures to ensure victory over enemies of the Revolution internal and external. On 20 March 1793 the National Convention sent Danton and Delacroix to Leuven to investigate Dumouriez and his generals. On 27 April, the Convention decreed (on the proposal of Danton) to send additional military forces to the departments in revolt.

On 1 June Hanriot was ordered to fire a cannon on the Pont-Neuf as a sign of alarm. When the Convention assembled Danton rushed to the tribune: "Break up the Commission of Twelve! You have heard the thunder of the cannon". Girondins protested against the closing of the city gates, against the tocsin and alarm-gun without the approval of the convention; Vergniaud suggested arresting Hanriot. That night Paris changed into a military camp according to Otto Flake. On 2 June according to Louis Madelin and Mignet a large force of armed citizens, some estimated 80,000 or 100,000, but Danton spoke of only 30,000, surrounded the Convention with 48 pieces of artillery. The next day the Interior minister Garat forced Danton to disavow the events from the evening before.

On 1 July 1793, Danton married Louise Sébastienne Gély, aged 17, daughter of Marc-Antoine Gély, court usher (huissier-audiencier) at the Parlement of Paris and member of the Club des Cordeliers. He also married in a Catholic ceremony, confessing his sins first to the priest Pierre-Marie Grayo de Keravenan. On 10 July, he was not re-elected as a member of the Committee of Public Safety. Seventeen days later, Robespierre joined the Committee of Public Safety, nearly two years after Danton had extended an invitation to him to do so. On 5 September, Danton argued for a law to give the sans-culottes a small compensation for attending the twice-weekly section meetings, and to provide a gun to every citizen.

== Reign of Terror ==
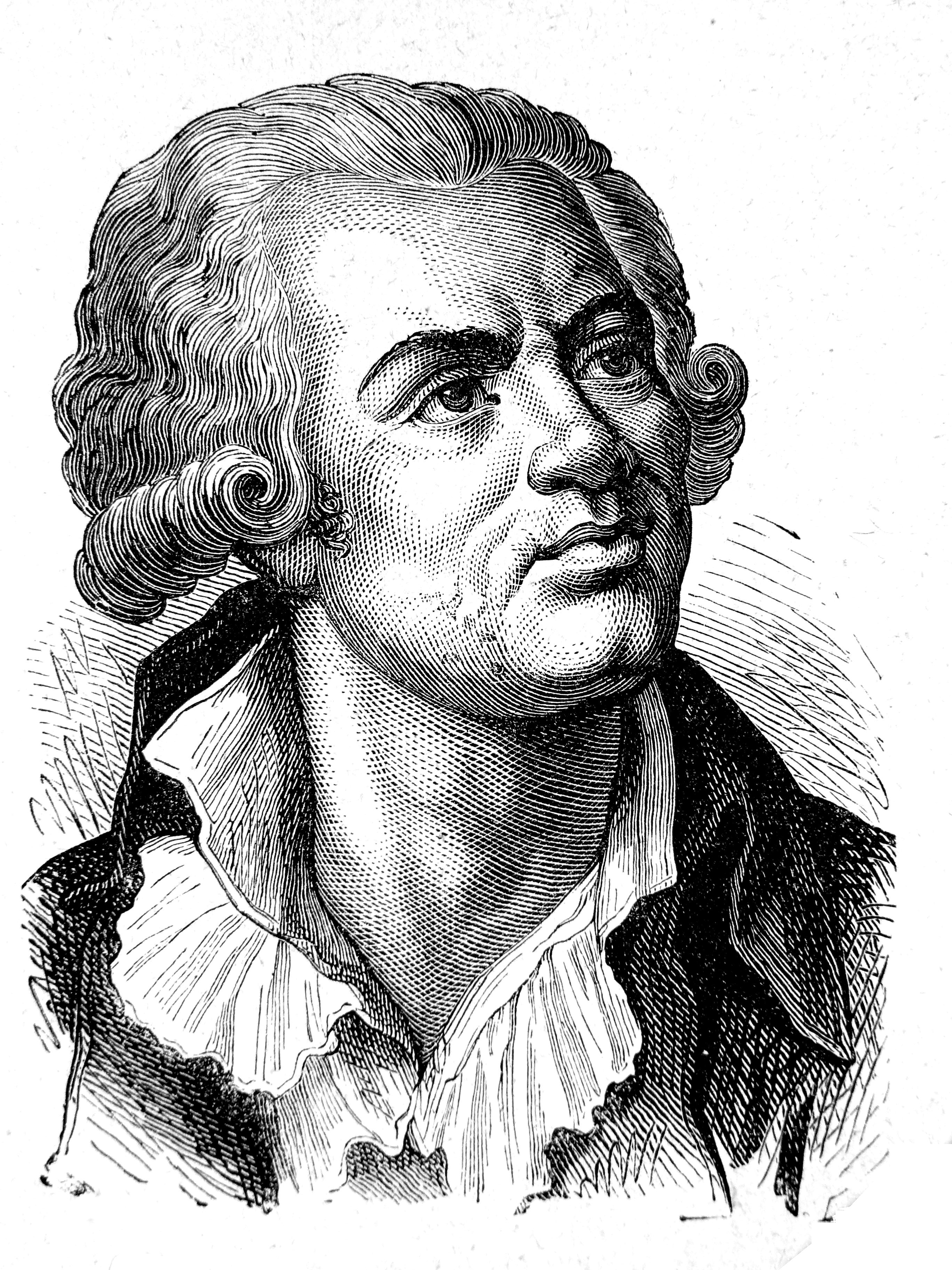
According to a biographer, "Danton's height was colossal, his make athletic, his features strongly marked, coarse, and displeasing; his voice shook the domes of the halls".

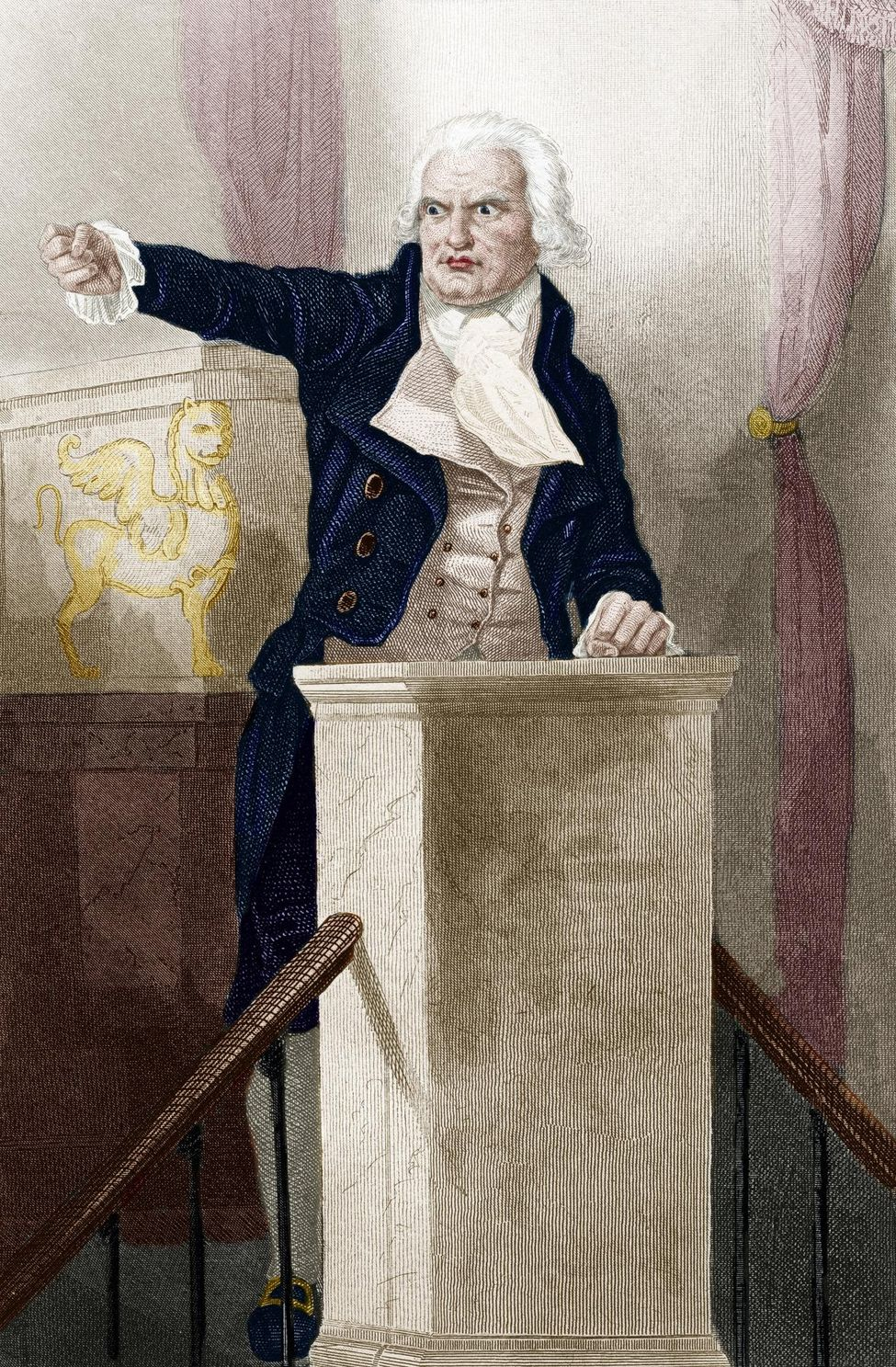
Danton addressing the Convention

On 6 September, Danton refused to take a seat in the Committee of Public Safety, declaring that he would join no committee, but would be a spur to them all. He believed a stable government was needed which could resist the orders of the Committee of Public Safety. On 10 October, Danton, who had been dangerously ill for a few weeks, quit politics, and set off to Arcis-sur-Aube with his 17-year-old wife, who had pitied Marie Antoinette since her trial began. On 18 November, after the arrest of François Chabot, Edme-Bonaventure Courtois urged Danton to come back to Paris to again play a role in politics.

On 22 November, Danton attacked religious persecution and demanded frugality with human lives. He tried to weaken the Terror by attacking Jacques René Hébert. On 3 December, Robespierre accused Danton of feigning an illness with the intention to emigrate to Switzerland, declaring that Danton showed too often his vices and not his virtue. Robespierre was stopped in his attack. The gathering was closed after thunderous applause for Danton. Danton maintained that he had absolutely no intention of breaking the revolutionary impulse.

On 9 December, Danton became embroiled in a scandal concerning the bankruptcy proceedings of the French East India Company, when it was discovered that directors of the company had bribed certain government officials to allow the company to liquidate its own assets, rather than the government controlling the process. By December, a Dantonist party had been formed in support of Danton's more moderate views and his insistence on clemency for those who had violated the Committee for Public Safety's increasingly arbitrary and draconian "counter-revolutionary" measures. On 25 December (5 Nivôse, year II) Robespierre replied to Danton's plea for an end to the Terror.

The French National Convention during the autumn of 1793 began to assert its authority further throughout France, creating the bloodiest period of the French Revolution, during which some historians assert approximately 40,000 people were killed in France. Following the fall of the Girondins, a group known as the Indulgents would emerge from amongst the Montagnards as the legislative right within the convention, with Danton as their most vocal leader. Having long supported the progressive acts of the Committee of Public Safety, Danton would begin to propose that the Committee retract legislation instituting terror as "the order of the day."

On 26 February 1794, Saint-Just delivered a speech before the Convention in which he directed the assault against Danton, claiming that the Dantonists wanted to slow down the Terror and the Revolution. It seems Danton became exasperated by Robespierre's repeated references to virtue. On 6 March, Barère attacked the Hébertists and Dantonists.

While the Committee of Public Safety was concerned with strengthening the centralist policies of the convention and its own grip over that body, Danton was in the process of devising a plan that would effectively move popular sentiment among delegates towards a more moderate stance. This included support for measures popular among the sans-culottes, particularly controls on the price of bread and other necessities amid severe inflation and food shortages. Danton also advocated negotiations with the powers of the First Coalition and a less expansionist foreign policy. In late March 1794, Danton again called for an end to the Terror. His position brought the Indulgents into increasingly direct conflict with the Committee of Public Safety.

The Reign of Terror was not a policy that could be easily transformed. Indeed, it would eventually continue past the Thermidorian Reaction (27 July 1794), when some members of the Convention rose against the committee, executed its leaders, and placed power in the hands of new men with a new policy – to dissolve Jacobinism (White Terror). However, in Germinal – that is, in March 1794 – the anti-Terror sentiment had not yet reached critical mass. The committees were still too strong to be overthrown, and Danton, heedless, instead of striking with vigor in the convention, waited to be struck. "In these latter days", wrote Morley in the Encyclopædia Britannica Eleventh Edition, "a certain discouragement seems to have come over his spirit". Danton remarried, and, Morley continues, "the rumour went that he was allowing domestic happiness to tempt him from the keen incessant vigilance proper to the politician in such a crisis."

Ultimately, Danton himself would become a victim of the Terror. In attempting to shift the direction of the revolution by collaborating with Camille Desmoulins on the production of Le Vieux Cordelier – a newspaper that called for the end of the official Terror and Dechristianization, as well as for launching new peace overtures to France's enemies – Danton had placed himself in a precarious position. Those most closely associated with the Committee of Public Safety, among them key figures such as Maximilien Robespierre and Georges Couthon, would eventually indict Danton for counter-revolutionary activities.

== Financial corruption and accusations ==
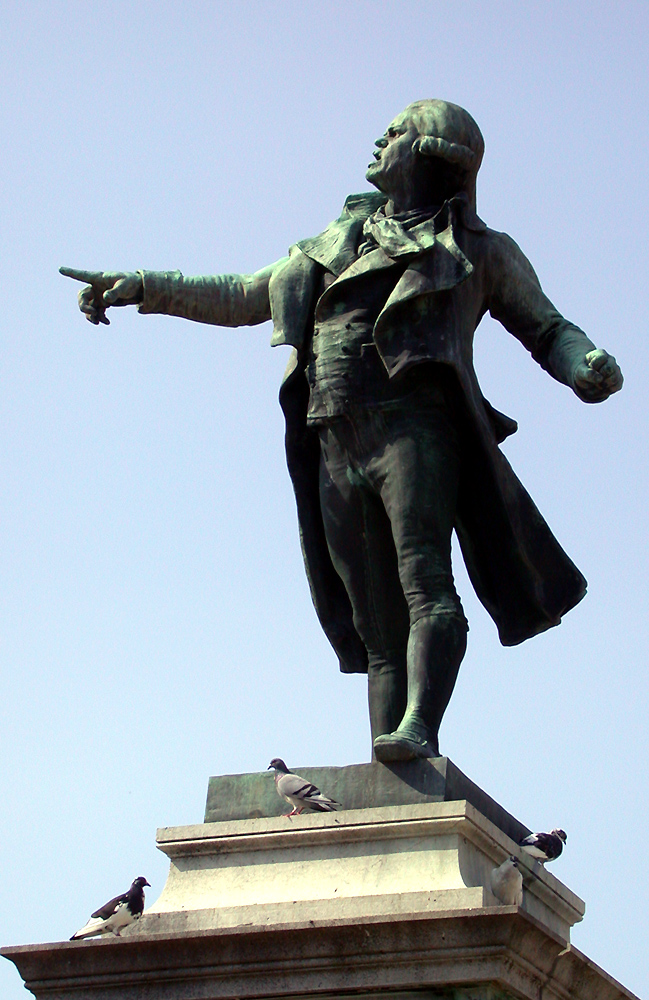
Statue of Danton in Tarbes.

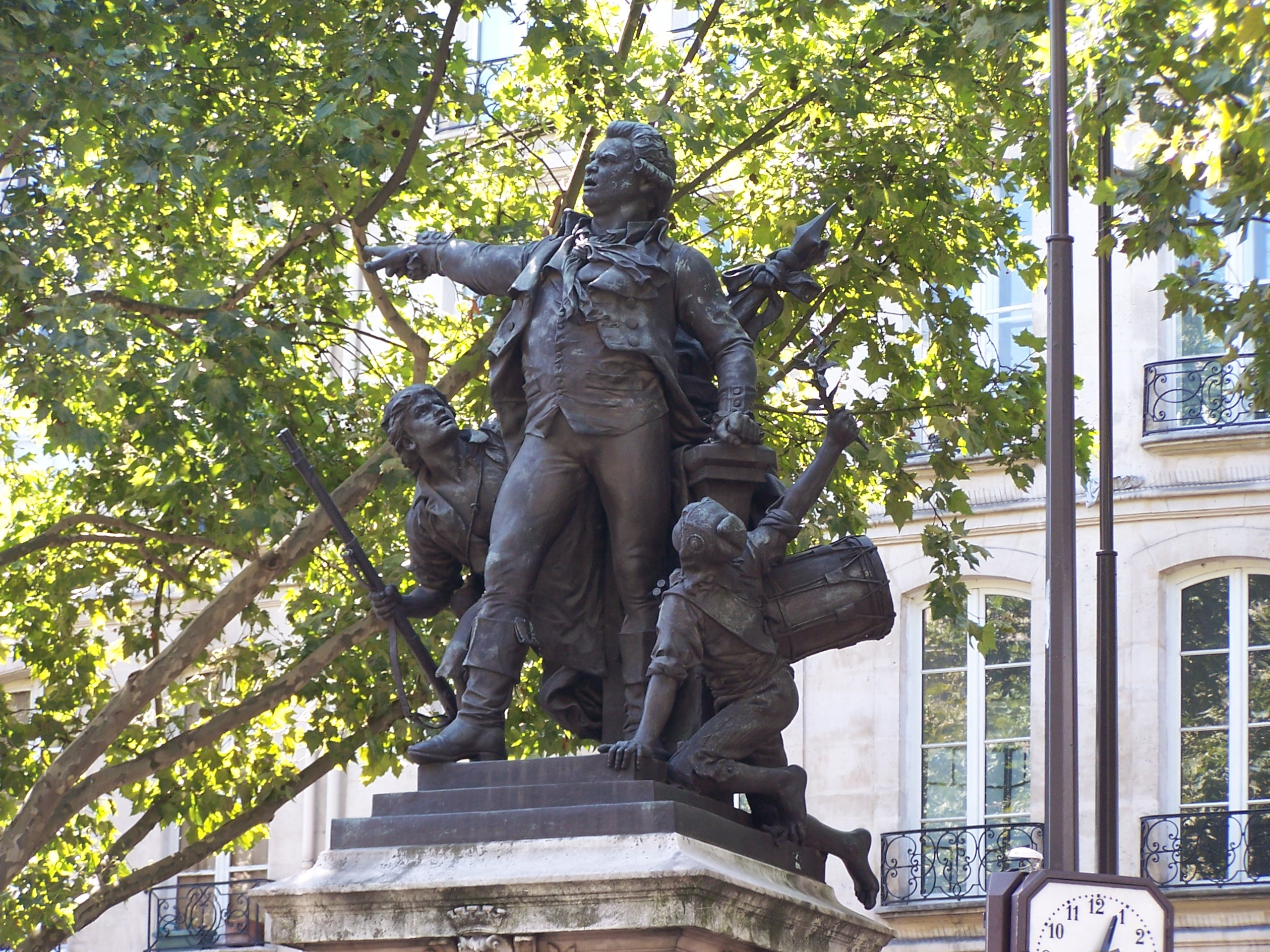
Statue de Danton au carrefour de Odéon (place Henri-Mondor, Paris)

Toward the end of the Reign of Terror, Danton was accused of various financial misdeeds, as well as using his position within the Revolution for personal gain. Many of his contemporaries commented on Danton's financial success during the Revolution, certain acquisitions of money that he could not adequately explain. Many of the specific accusations directed against him were based on insubstantial or ambiguous evidence. For the Revolutionary Tribunal legal evidence was unnecessary, moral conviction by jury was enough to speed up the proceedings.

Between 1791 and 1793, Danton faced many allegations, including taking bribes during the insurrection of August 1792, helping his secretaries to line their pockets, and forging assignats during his mission to Belgium. Perhaps the most compelling evidence of financial corruption was a letter from Mirabeau to Danton in March 1791 that casually referred to 30,000 livres that Danton had received in payment.

During his tenure on the Committee of Public Safety, Danton supported negotiations for an alliance with Sweden. Although the Swedish government never ratified the treaty, on 28 June 1793, the convention voted to pay 4 million livres to the Swedish Regent for diplomatic negotiations. According to Bertrand Barère, Danton had appropriated part of the money intended for the Swedish negotiations.

The most serious accusation, which haunted him during his arrest and formed a chief ground for his execution, was his alleged involvement with a scheme to appropriate the wealth of the French East India Company. During the reign of the Old Regime, the original French East India Company went bankrupt. It was later revived in 1785, backed by royal patronage. The Company eventually fell under the notice of the National Convention for profiteering during the war. The company was soon liquidated while certain members of the Convention tried to push through a decree that would cause the share prices to rise before the liquidation. Discovery of the profits from this insider trading led to the blackmailing of the directors of the company to turn over half a million livres to known associates of Danton. While there was no hard evidence that Danton was involved, he was vigorously denounced by François Chabot, and implicated by the fact that Fabre d’Eglantine, a Dantonist, was implicated in the scandal. After Chabot was arrested on 17 November, Courtois urged Danton to return to Paris immediately.

In December 1793, the journalist Camille Desmoulins launched a new journal, Le Vieux Cordelier, attacking François Chabot and defending Danton in the first issue. In the second, Desmoulins attacked the use of terror as a governing tactic, comparing Robespierre with Julius Caesar and, in the following issue, arguing that the Revolution should return to its original ideas which were in vogue around 10 August 1792. Robespierre replied to Danton's plea for an end to the Terror on 25 December (5 Nivôse, year II). Danton continued to defend Fabre d'Eglantine even after the latter had been exposed and arrested.

By February 1794, Danton was exasperated by Robespierre's repeated references to virtue as the foundation of the revolutionary government. Danton's continual criticism of the Committee of Public Safety provoked further counter-attacks. On 26 February 1794, Saint-Just, the president of the Convention, delivered a speech in which he directed the assault against Danton.

At the end of March 1794, Danton made a triumphant speech announcing the end of the Terror. Some government members were convinced that Danton was pushing for leadership in a post-Terror government. For several months, Robespierre had resisted arresting Danton. According to Linton, Robespierre had to choose between friendship and virtue. His aim was to sow enough doubt in the minds of the deputies regarding Danton's political integrity to make it possible to proceed against him. Robespierre refused to see Desmoulins and rejected a private appeal. Then Robespierre broke with Danton, who had angered many other members of the Committee of Public Safety with his more moderate views on the Terror, but whom Robespierre had, until this point, persisted in defending.

== Arrest, trial, and execution ==
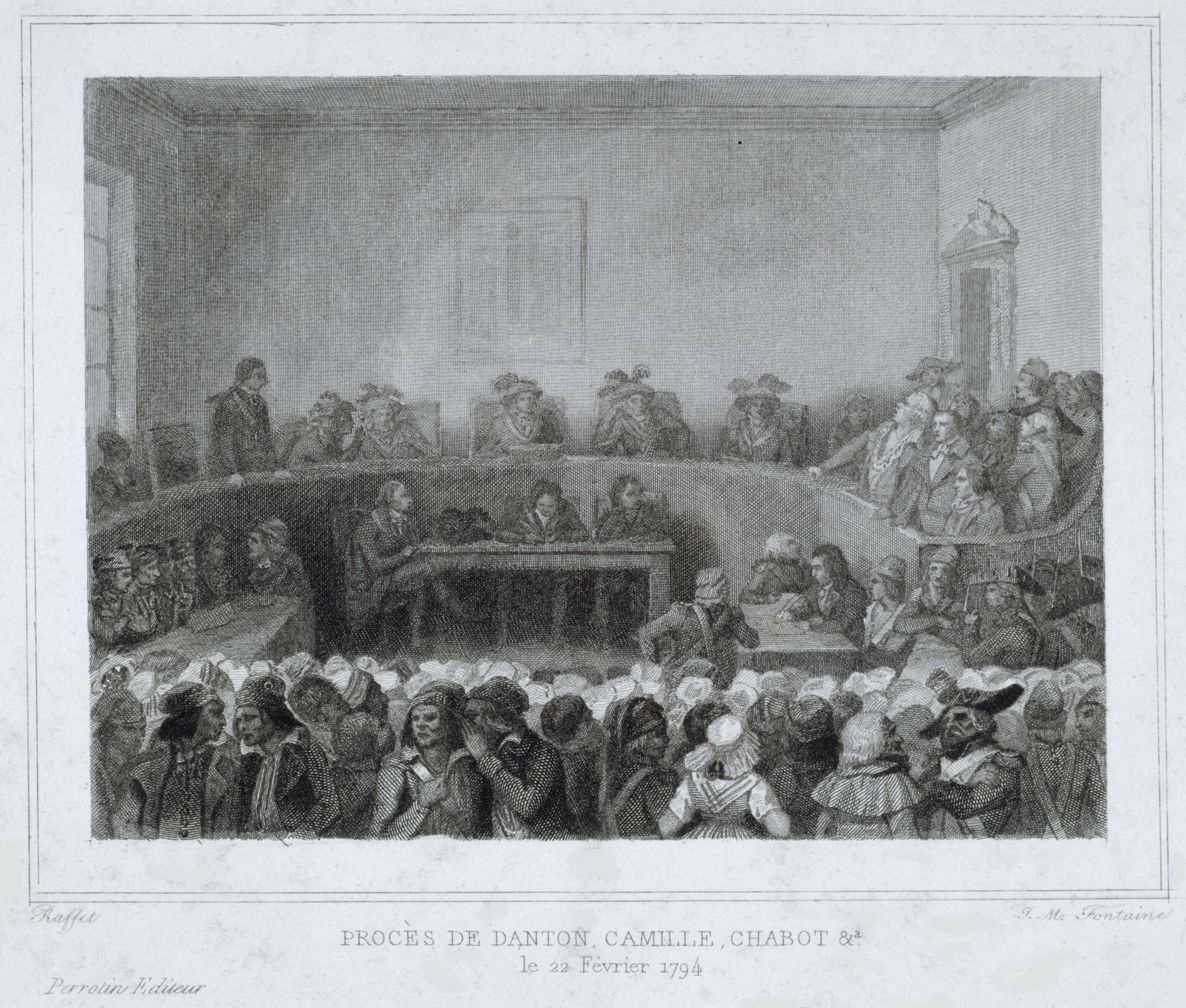
Danton, Desmoulins and their allies tried before the Revolutionary Tribunal

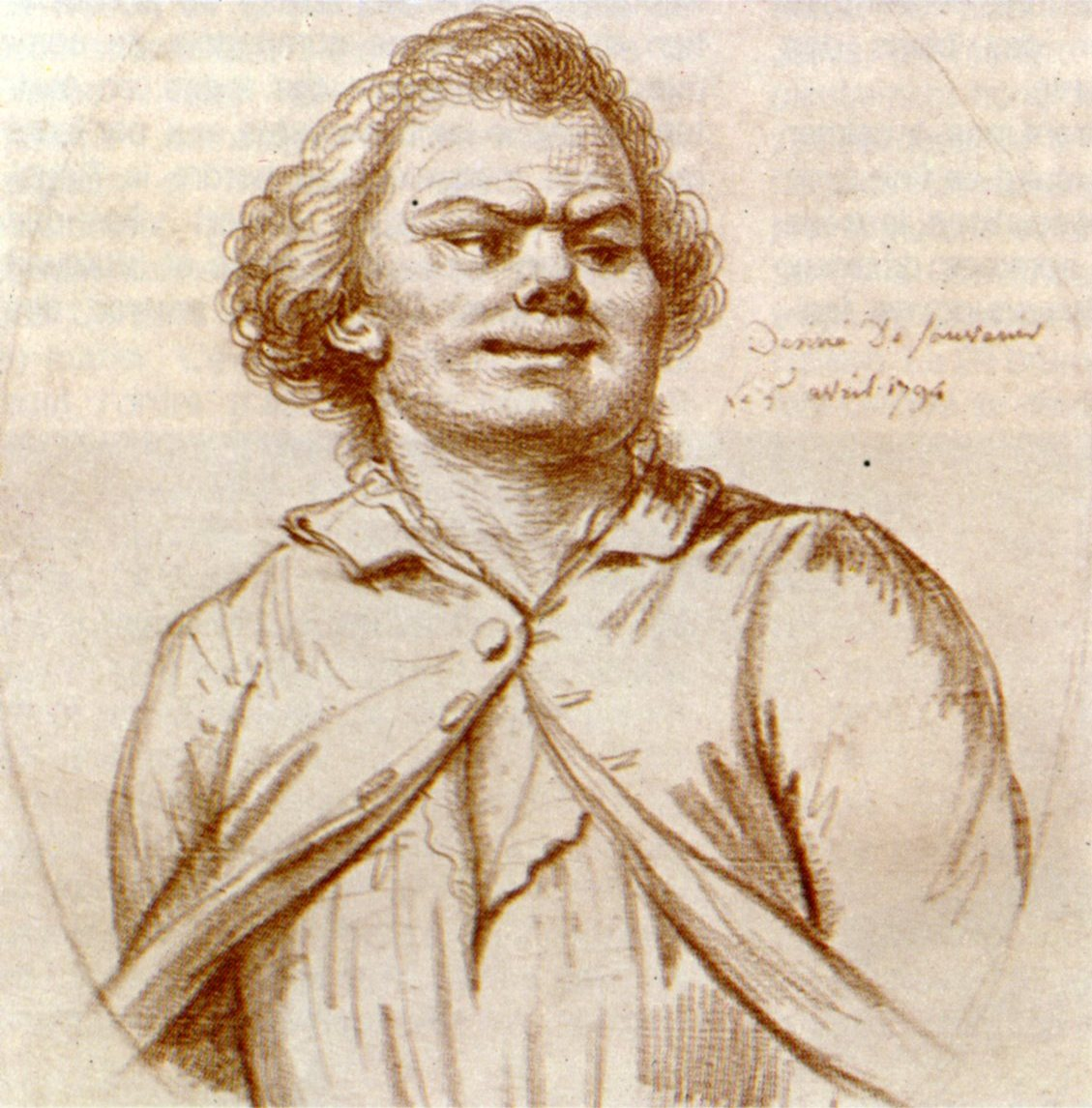
Danton on 5 April 1794 by Pierre-Alexandre Wille

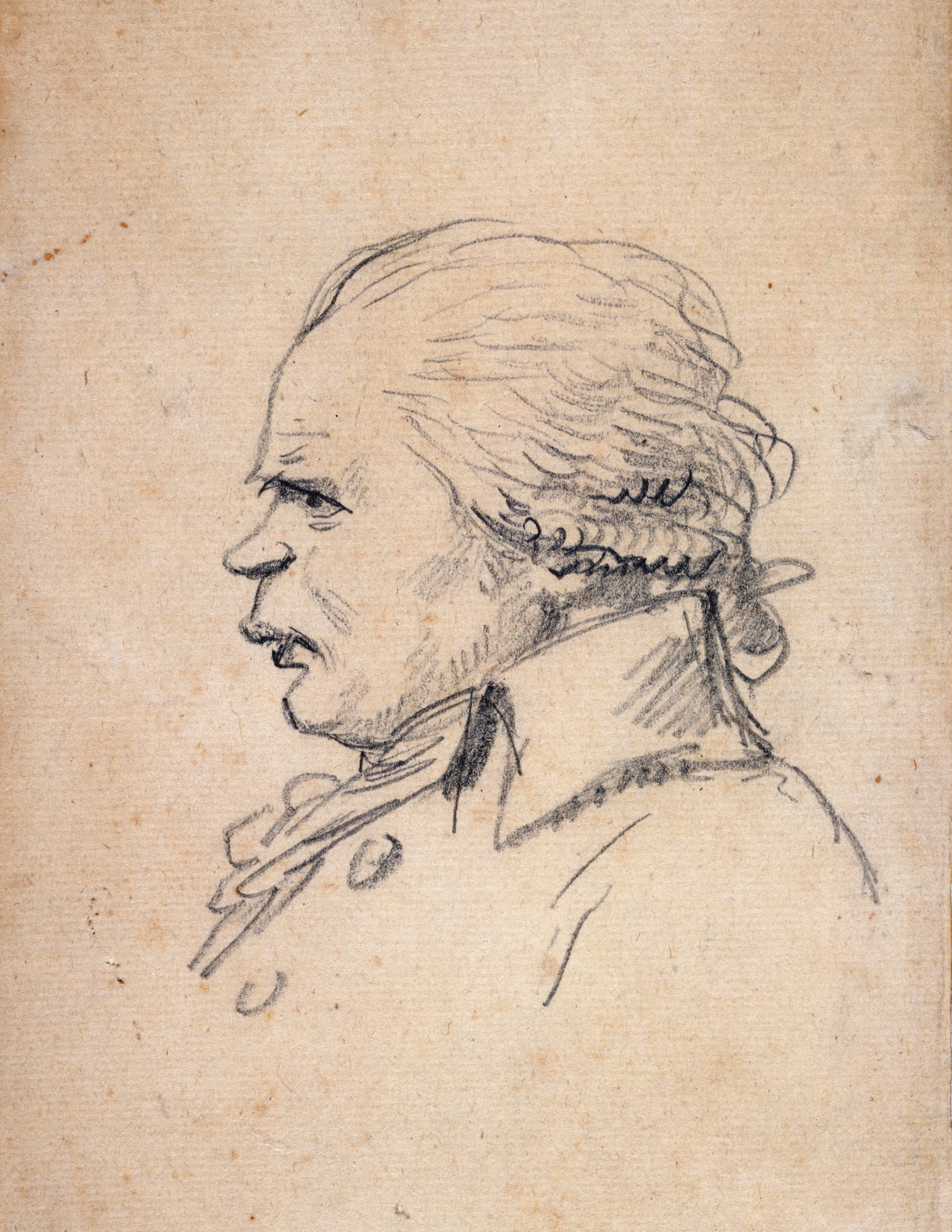
Danton by Jacques-Louis David

On 30 March, the two committees reached a decision to apprehend Danton, Desmoulins, Marie-Jean Hérault de Séchelles, and Pierre Philippeaux. The trial began on 2 April, accusing them of conspiracy with count Mirabeau, Marquis de Lafayette, the Duke of Orléans and Dumouriez. In Robespierre's eyes, the Dantonists had ceased to be true patriots prioritizing personal and foreign interests over the nation's welfare. The accusations of theft, corruption, and the scandal involving the French East India Company conveniently paved the way for Danton's downfall.

Danton, Desmoulins, and several others faced trial from 3–5 April before the Revolutionary Tribunal, presided over by Martial Herman. Described as more politically charged than criminally focused, the trial proceeded in an irregular manner. The tribunal constituted a jury of five judges, including Souberbielle, and François Topino-Lebrun (who both hesitated to condemn Danton); the law required twelve jurors but only seven were present. Both Delacroix and Danton requested the right to present about 15 witnesses in their defense, but President Herman denied their request.

During the Convention, Louis Legendre, who was also one of the witnesses, proposed hearing from Danton within the assembly, but Robespierre replied, "It would be violating the laws of impartiality to grant to Danton what was refused to others, who had an equal right to make the same demand." This answer silenced at once all solicitations in his favor. No friend of the Dantonists dared speak up, in case he too should be accused of putting friendship before virtue. The death of Hébert had rendered Robespierre master of the Paris Commune; the death of Danton would make him master of the convention as well.

During the trial, Delacroix and Danton's disruptive behavior unsettled Fouquier-Tinville. Danton vigorously criticized the Committee of Public Safety, causing concern among the jury that he might win favor with the crowd. Following Robespierre's advice, a decree was accepted to present Saint-Just's account on Danton's alleged royalist tendencies at the tribunal, effectively ending further debates and restraining any further insults to justice by the accused.

The Convention, amidst what was described as one of its "worst fits of cowardice", approved Saint-Just's proposal during the trial. This proposal allowed the tribunal to exclude any prisoner displaying disrespect for justice from further proceedings, enabling the tribunal to pronounce a sentence in the absentia of the accused.

President Herman struggled to control the proceedings until the Convention enacted the aforementioned decree, limiting the accused from further self-defense. These events were compounded by confusing and often incidental accusations, such as a report suggesting that while engaged as a commissioner in Belgium, Danton had allegedly appropriated a carriage filled with table linen worth two or three hundred thousand livres from the Archduchess of Austria. The Moniteur published an account of the discussion in the Jacobin Club: Danton was accused of wanting to arrest Francois Henriot on 31 May 1793 and to become regent for Louis XVII.

On the last day Fouquier-Tinville asked the tribunal to order the defendants who "confused the hearing" and insulted "National Justice" to the guillotine. "I leave it all in a frightful welter", Danton said. "Not a man of them has an idea of government. Robespierre will follow me; he is dragged down by me. Ah, better to be a poor fisherman than to meddle with the government of men!". Judge Souberbielle asked himself: "Which of the two, Robespierre or Danton, is the more useful to the Republic?"

Fouquier-Tinville resorted to his customary approach, "asking" the jury if they felt adequately "enlightened," ultimately leading to a verdict of guilty. The defendants, of whom nine were députés of the Convention, were removed from the room before the verdict was delivered and, by cutting their hair, prepared for the guillotine. Danton was beheaded on 5 April 1794 at sunset, together with group of fifteen people which included Hérault de Séchelles, Westermann and Philippeaux among others. Hérault de Séchelle was first, Desmoulins died third and Danton last. It is said his last words, spoken to his executioner Sanson were "show the people my head. It is well worth seeing."

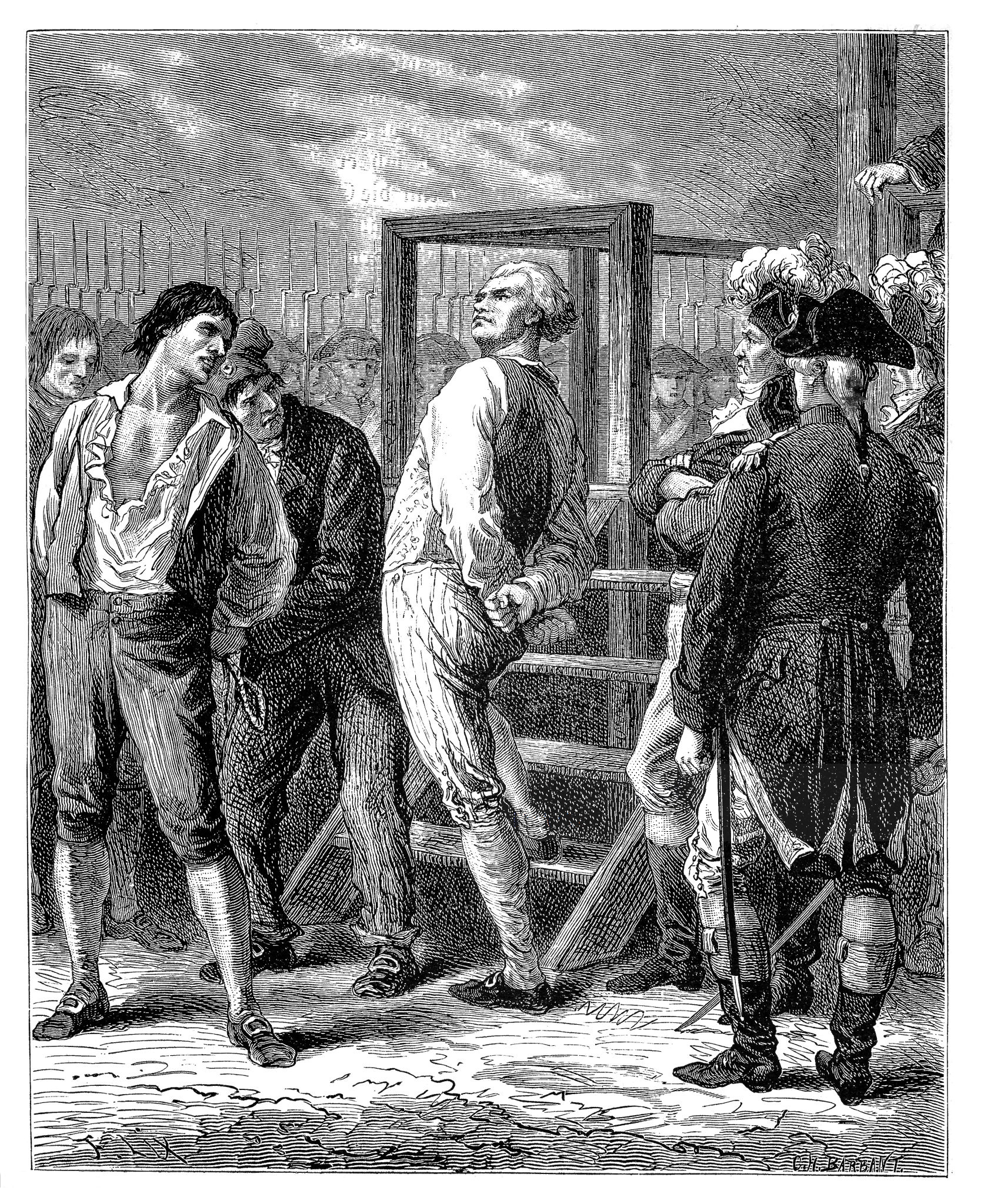
Execution of Danton on 5 April 1794

Fabre d'Églantine, Delaunay, Junius Frey, Chabot, Bazire were involved in the scandal around the French East India Company. Robespierre was sharply critical of Amar's report, which presented the scandal as purely a matter of fraud. Robespierre insisted that it was a foreign plot, demanded that the report be re-written, and used the scandal as the basis for rhetorical attacks on William Pitt the Younger who he believed was involved. The directors of the French East India Company were never interrogated at all. Some scholars have supported this view, pointing to links between the Pitt government and the Baron de Batz, who developed plans to use economic warfare to create discord among leaders of the Revolution.

Danton and his associates were buried in the Errancis Cemetery, a common place of interment for those executed during the Revolution. In the mid-19th century, their skeletal remains were transferred to the Catacombs of Paris. Martial Herman resigned as president on 7 April.

On 9 Thermidor, when Garnier de l’Aube witnessed Robespierre's inability to respond, he shouted, "The blood of Danton chokes him!" Robespierre then finally regained his voice to reply with his one recorded statement of the morning, a demand to know why he was now being blamed for the other man's death: "Is it Danton you regret? ... Cowards! Why didn't you defend him?"

== Character disputes ==
Danton's influence and character during the French Revolution were, and still are, widely disputed among many historians, with the varied perspectives on him ranging from corrupt and violent to generous and patriotic. Danton did not leave very much in the way of written works, personal or political; therefore most information about his actions and personality has been derived from secondhand sources.

One view of Danton, presented by historians like Thiers and Mignet, suggested he was "a gigantic revolutionary" with extravagant passions, a high level of intelligence, and an eagerness for violence in the pursuit of his goals. Another portrait of Danton emerges from the work of Lamartine, who called Danton a man "devoid of honor, principles, and morality" who found only excitement and a chance for distinction during the French Revolution. He was a mere "statesman of materialism" who was bought anew every day. Any revolutionary moments were staged for the prospect of glory and more wealth.

A differing perspective on Danton is presented by Robinet, whose assessment is more positive and portrays him as a figure worthy of admiration. According to Robinet, Danton was a committed, loving, generous citizen, son, father, and husband. He remained loyal to his friends and the country of France by avoiding "personal ambition" and gave himself wholly to the cause of keeping "the government consolidated" for the Republic. He always had a love for his country and the laboring masses, who he felt deserved "dignity, consolation, and happiness".

Morley (1911) wrote that Danton stands out as a master of commanding phrase. One of his fierce sayings has become a proverb. Against the Duke of Brunswick and the invaders, "il nous faut de l'audace, et encore de l'audace, et toujours de l'audace" – "We need daring, and yet more daring, and always daring!". According to Georges Lefebvre, Danton was "nonchalant and lazy", but also optimistic, energetic, fond of the pleasures of life, carefree and indulgent, qualities that helped make him a natural leader.

== Fictionalized accounts ==
A print of Danton's son, using an optical viewer, with his stepmother

- Danton's last days were made into a play, Dantons Tod (Danton's Death), by Georg Büchner.
  - The play formed the basis of the 1921 German film Danton.
  - On the basis of Büchner's play, Gottfried von Einem wrote an opera with the same title, on a libretto by himself and Boris Blacher, which premiered on 6 August 1947 at the Salzburger Festspiele.
- Danton, Robespierre, and Marat are characters in Victor Hugo's novel Ninety-Three (Quatrevingt-treize), set during the French Revolution.
- Danton is a central character in Romanian playwright Camil Petrescu's play of the same name.
- Danton appears in the Hungarian play The Tragedy of Man and the animated movie of the same name as one of Adam's incarnations throughout Lucifer's illusion.
- Danton's and Robespierre's quarrels were turned into a 1983 film, Danton, directed by Andrzej Wajda. The film itself is loosely based on Stanisława Przybyszewska's 1929 play Sprawa Dantona ("The Danton Case").
- Danton's and Robespierre's relations were also the subject of an opera by American composer John Eaton, Danton and Robespierre (1978).
- Danton is extensively featured in La Révolution française (1989).
- In his novel Locus Solus, Raymond Roussel tells a story in which Danton makes an arrangement with his executioner for his head to be smuggled into his friend's possession after his execution. The nerves and musculature of the head ultimately end up on display in the private collection of Martial Canterel, reanimated by special electrical currents and showing a deeply entrenched disposition toward oratory.
- The Revolution as experienced by Danton, Robespierre, and Desmoulins is the central focus of Hilary Mantel's novel A Place of Greater Safety (1993).
- Danton and Desmoulins are the main characters of Tanith Lee's The Gods Are Thirsty – A Novel of the French Revolution (1996).
- Danton and Robespierre are briefly referred to in the book The Scarlet Pimpernel. The two men both applaud a guard for his work in catching aristocrats.
- In The Tangled Thread, Volume 10 of The Morland Dynasty, a series of historical novels by author Cynthia Harrod-Eagles, the character Henri-Marie Fitzjames Stuart, bastard offshoot of the fictional Morland family, allies himself with Danton in an attempt to protect his family as the storm clouds of revolution gather over France.
- Danton appears briefly in Rafael Sabatini's adventure novel Scaramouche: A tale of romance in the French Revolution.
- Danton appears in a series of comics entitled "The Last Days of Georges Danton" in Step Aside, Pops: A Hark! A Vagrant Collection by Kate Beaton.
- Danton is one of six point-of-view characters in Marge Piercy's novel City of Darkness, City of Light (1996).
- Danton, along with Marat and Robespierre, is a secondary character in the 1927 epic Napoléon. His portrayal in the film is somewhat cartoonish, as he is depicted as a decadent fop, albeit dedicated to republicanism and revolution, and it is he that allows Rouget de Lisle to premiere "La Marseillaise" at the Club des Cordeliers. (In reality, no such performance by Rouget de Lisle is known to have taken place.)
- Danton appears as a Jacobin Great Person in the 2025 video game Civilization VII. He appears for the French Empire; when activated on a palace a celebration is triggered.
- Danton has a dedicated song, from the Italian Rapper Caparezza, the song is called "La ghigliottina" <The guillotine> and is from his 5th album "Il Sogno Eretico"

== Sources ==
- Hampson, Norman (1974). The Life and Opinions of Maximilien Robespierre. Duckworth. ISBN 978-0-7156-0741-1.
- Linton, Marisa (2013). Choosing Terror: Virtue, Friendship, and Authenticity in the French Revolution. Oxford University Press. ISBN 978-0-19-957630-2. OCLC 854998068.
- Schama, Simon (1989). Citizens: A Chronicle of the French Revolution. New York: Alfred A. Knopf. ISBN 978-0-394-55948-3.

Political offices
Preceded by Etienne Dejoly	Minister of Justice; 1792	Succeeded by Dominique Joseph Garat
