= Pierre-Marie Grayo de Keravenan =

French priest (1762–1831)

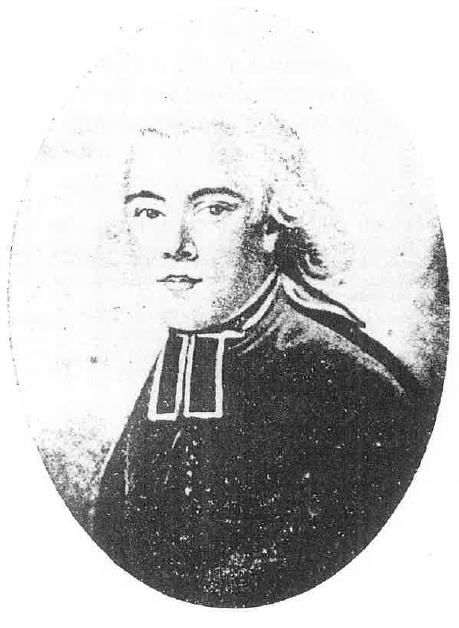
Pierre-Marie Grayo de Keravenan

Pierre-Marie Grayo de Keravenan (February 3, 1762 – May 26, 1831) was a French priest.

Pierre-Marie Grayo was born on February 3, 1762, in Keravenan, Questembert, and attended the Collège Saint-Yves in Vannes. He studied at the Saint-Sulpice seminary and was ordained priest in 1786. He then became curate at Saint-Sulpice in Paris. When the Revolution broke out, he opposed the Civil Constitution of the Clergy and continued his ministry clandestinely. He escaped execution at the Carmelite Convent, reconciled Georges Danton to the Catholic faith in 1793, and became parish priest of Saint-Germain-des-Prés in 1816. He died in Paris on May 26, 1831.

== Biography ==
=== Martyrs of Compiègne ===
On August 10, 1792, with the fall of the French monarchy, the Paris Commune led a hunt for nobles and refractory priests, provoking raids across the city. On August 15, 1792, Abbé Pierre Grayo de Keravenan, then at the Sulpician house in Issy, surrounded by seminarians and priests celebrating the feast of the Mary's Assumption, was arrested by a group of revolutionaries led by Claude François Lazowski, taken by force and imprisoned in the Carmelite convent on rue Vaugirard in Paris.

On September 2, 1792, the revolutionaries carried out a summary judgment. 191 clergy, including three bishops, were executed at the Carmelite convent under the leadership of commissioner Stanislas-Marie Maillard. Abbé de Keravenan, who had taken refuge in the attic, escaped murder.

After these executions, Keravenan continued his clandestine religious ministry of baptisms, confessions, and marriages despite the dangers of the Revolutionary Terror.

=== De Keravenan and Danton ===
In 1793, he witnessed Georges-Jacques Danton's return to Catholicism. Having lost his wife, Danton planned to marry Louise Gély, but she stipulated that the marriage be blessed by a priest who had not sworn allegiance to the new Constitution.

Living in a modest apartment in the Saint-Germain-des-Prés district, de Keravenan received Danton, heard his confession, and granted him absolution. Then, on June 17, 1793, de Keravenan secretly celebrated Danton's marriage to Louise Gély.

Danton was arrested in March 1794. Condemned to death on his final journey to the scaffold on April 5, 1794, Abbé Grayo de Keravenan, in the crowd, gave him a sign of absolution. After Danton's execution, Abbé Pierre Grayo de Keravenan continued to hide in Paris, and despite the dangers he faced, began to celebrate masses clandestinely.

=== After the revolution ===
During the Directory period, following the elections of Germinal in 1797, moderates enjoyed a period of relative tranquility. However, following the coup d'état on September 4, 1797, religious persecution resumed. Abbé de Keravenan, vicar of Saint-Sulpice, was forced to return to clandestine ministry.

After the government of Napoleon Bonaparte signed the Concordat of 1801 with the Pope, Pierre Grayo declined an offer to become parish priest at Saint-Germain-des-Prés, preferring to resume his duties as vicar at Saint-Sulpice.

In 1804, Pierre Grayo de Keravenan, along with his cousin Louis Burban, provided a hiding place for the royalist Georges Cadoudal as he fled from the police. Cadoudal and Louis Burban were later arrested and sentenced to death. de Keravenan ministered to them before their executions.

On April 5, 1804, he visited General Jean-Charles Pichegru on the eve of his death. Pichegru, a former revolutionary general and clandestine monarchist, was imprisoned for his conspiracy against Napoleon. Keravenan heard his last confession and gave him the Eucharist.

On July 3, 1804, Napoleon forbade Abbé de Keravenan to stay in Paris, and on July 7, he was ordered to retire to the diocese of Orléans under police supervision. In 1807, he was accepted into the diocese of Versailles, but attempts to return to Paris were all rejected. Abbé Grayo remained excluded from Paris until the end of the Empire.

=== Curé de Saint-Germain-des-Prés ===
In November 1816, Keravenan accepted the post of parish priest at Saint-Germain-des-Prés. The church, devastated during the revolution, was in need of major renovation. Keravenan invested personal funds and enlisted the help of his parishioners and public authorities, even gaining the support of Louis XVIII. His reputation earned him a warm welcome at court, where he was appreciated for his devotion to the poor. For fifteen years, Keravenan ministered at Saint-Germain-des-Prés. His life was overshadowed by the revolution of 1830. He suffered a stroke and died on May 26, 1831.
