= Louis Legendre =

French politician (1752–1797)

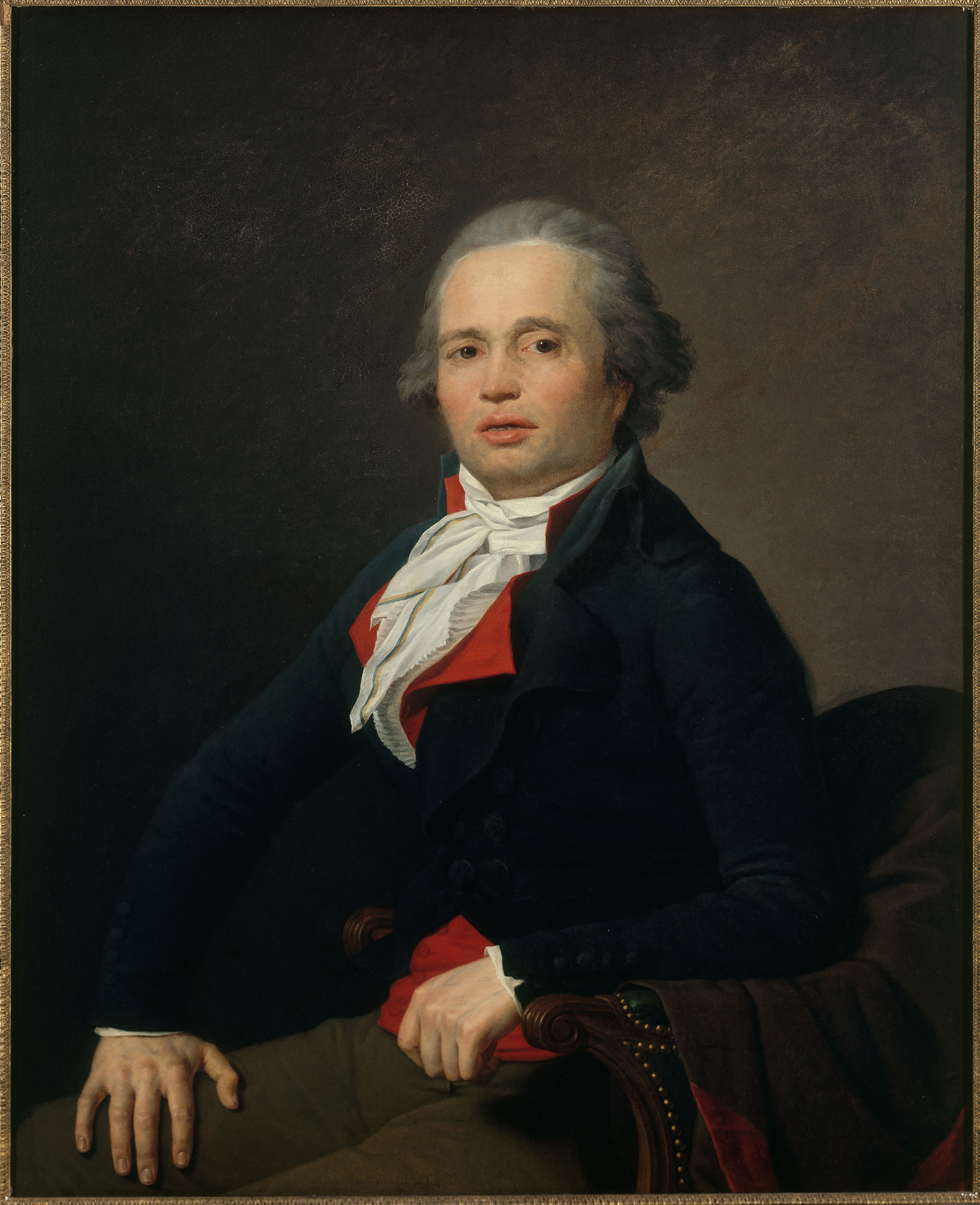
- Portrait of Legendre, c. 1795, oil on canvas by Jean-Louis Laneuville, Paris (Musée Carnavalet)

54th President of the National Convention
- In office 6–24 November 1794
- Preceded by: Pierre Louis Prieur
- Succeeded by: Jean-Baptiste Clauzel

Personal details
- Born: 22 May 1752 Versailles, Kingdom of France
- Died: 13 December 1797 (aged 45) Paris, France
- Party: The Mountain

Louis Legendre (French pronunciation: [lwi ləʒɑ̃dʁ]; 22 May 1752 – 13 December 1797) was a French politician of the Revolution period.

== Early activities ==
Born at Versailles, he was keeping a butcher's shop in Saint Germain, Paris, by 1789. He was an ardent supporter of the ideas of the Revolution and a leader of the Storming of the Bastille; a close friend of Georges Danton, Legendre was a member of the Jacobin Club, and one of the founders of the club of the Cordeliers. In spite of his diction problems and lack of education, he became a noted orator.

He was present in the crowd that demanded the removal of King Louis XVI on Champ de Mars in July 1791 (and during the subsequent massacre ordered by Jean Sylvain Bailly). Louis Legendre also took part in the 10 August attack on the Tuileries Palace (1792).

It was alleged that the day before the execution, on 20 January, he made a motion in the tribune of the Jacobins that the body of the ex-king be divided into 84 pieces so that one could send one to each of the 84 departments of the Republic.

== Convention and Terror ==
Deputy for the Seine département to the National Convention, he joined the non-affiliated group led by Jean-Paul Marat, and voted for the execution of Louis XVI. He was sent on missions to Lyon (in February 1793, before the town revolted) and to the Seine-Inférieure (from August to October 1793). Upon his return from Lyon, he was singled out as a moderate by the Jacobins, but became an adversary of the Girondists after clashes with Count Lanjuinais - as a member of the Committee of General Security during the Reign of Terror, he contributed to the downfall of the group; he was excluded by the Cordeliers after Jacques Hébert accused him of favoring Maximilien Robespierre.

With Louis Louchet and Jean-François Delacroix, he was again on mission to Rouen, and was accused by Hébert of supporting the Royalists. Legendre also supported Danton in early March 1794, but ultimately sided with Robespierre after the latter threatened him with the guillotine.

== Reaction and Directory ==
From that moment until July, he remained inactive. On 27 July, the start of the Thermidorian Reaction, Legendre, after having signed his name on the list of speakers, would have asked Jacques-Alexis Thuriot de la Rosière (one of the putsch leaders): "Strike my name off. I shall see how this turns out". As Robespierre's fall seemed inevitable, Legendre sided with the Reaction, and led troops against putsches of Jacobins and Charles Pichegru (1795).

He was elected president of the convention, and helped bring about the impeachment of Jean-Baptiste Carrier, the perpetrator of mass executions by drowning (noyades) of royalist sympathizers. He was subsequently elected a member of the Council of Ancients. During the French Directory, Legendre was elected to the Council of Five Hundred, but was already suffering from dementia.

== Mistaken identity ==
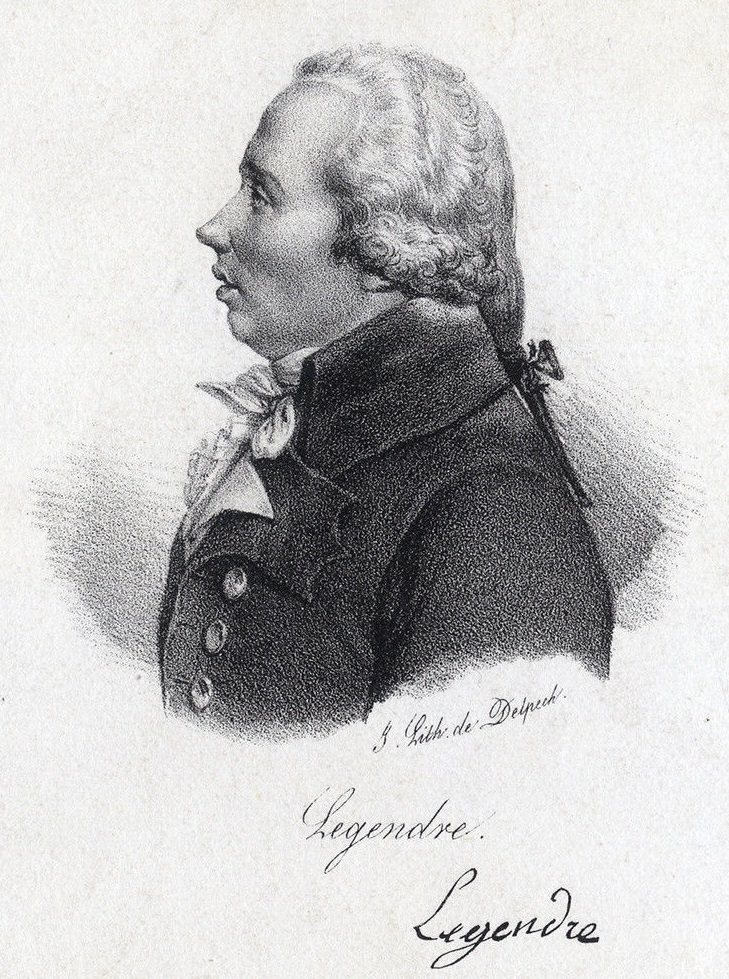
Side view sketching of Louis Legendre, whose portrait was mistakenly used, for nearly 200 years, to represent French mathematician Adrien-Marie Legendre, i.e., up until 2005 when the mistake was discovered.

For two centuries, until the discovery of the error in 2005, media including books, paintings, and articles had incorrectly printed a side-view portrait of Louis Legendre as that of the French mathematician Adrien-Marie Legendre (1752–1833). The error arose from the fact that the sketch was labelled simply "Legendre".

In 2008, after a three-year active search, the error was finally corrected, when an 1820 book containing the sketches of seventy-three famous French mathematicians, including Adrien-Marie Legendre, was found.
