= Claude André Deseine =

French sculptor

Claude-André Deseine (12 April 1740 – 30 December 1823) was a French sculptor and the elder brother of Louis-Pierre Deseine.

== Life ==
Deseine was the son of an artisan and his wife, and was one of many (perhaps more than fifteen) children. His father died in 1777 and a court ruled that Deseine, "being deaf and dumb from birth", could control his own income but had to have his possessions managed by guardians.

In 1778, he was a student at the Royal Academy of Painting and Sculpture in Paris. Soon after, he started working professionally: in 1783 he sold busts of Madame Saint-Huberty, Voltaire and Rousseau, from his house in Paris. Deseine had been a former pupil of l'Abbe de l'Eppe, a priest who had opened the world's first free school for the deaf, and developed a form of sign language. In 1786 he presented the National Assembly with a bust of his former teacher.

Deseine's work gained prominence during the French Revolution. The art historian Michael Levey has contrasted his Republican sensibilities, and the exaggerated character of his portrait studies, with the work of his royalist younger brother Louis-Pierre. Deseine was often at the Jacobin Club, where he obtained a prize for his 1791 bust of Mirabeau and sold a number of busts of other deputies. He successfully petitioned the Assembly for the right to make a full-size statue of l'Eppe based upon his earlier bust, but never completed this work: as time went on, all priests soon became objects of suspicion to the revolutionary authorities.

One of Deseine's more notorious commissions took place on the night of 17 February 1793. The sculptor was recruited by Georges Danton and brought to Sainte-Catherine cemetery, to the grave of Danton's recently deceased wife. The body of Antoinette Gabrielle Danton was excavated so that Deseine could make her death mask. This was then used to create an accurate commemorative bust.

After the fall of Robespierre in 1794 many Jacobins, including Deseine, went underground. Little is known of his later years.

== Partial List of Works ==
- Portrait bust of Madame Saint-Huberty (1783)
- Portrait bust of Voltaire (1783)
- Portrait bust of Rousseau (1783)
- Portrait bust of a young girl with wreath of flowers (1784)
- Portrait bust of l’Abbé de l’Épée (1786)
- Portrait bust of Muhammad Osman Khan (1788)
- Allegory of Liberty, with M. d'Orléans (1791)
- Portrait bust of Mirabeau (1791)
- Portrait bust of Robespierre (1792)
- Portrait bust of Antoinette Gabrielle Danton (1793)
- Portrait bust of Lepeletier de Saint-Fargeau (1793)
- Portrait bust of Jean-Paul Marat (1793)
- Portrait bust of Mucius Scaevola (1793)
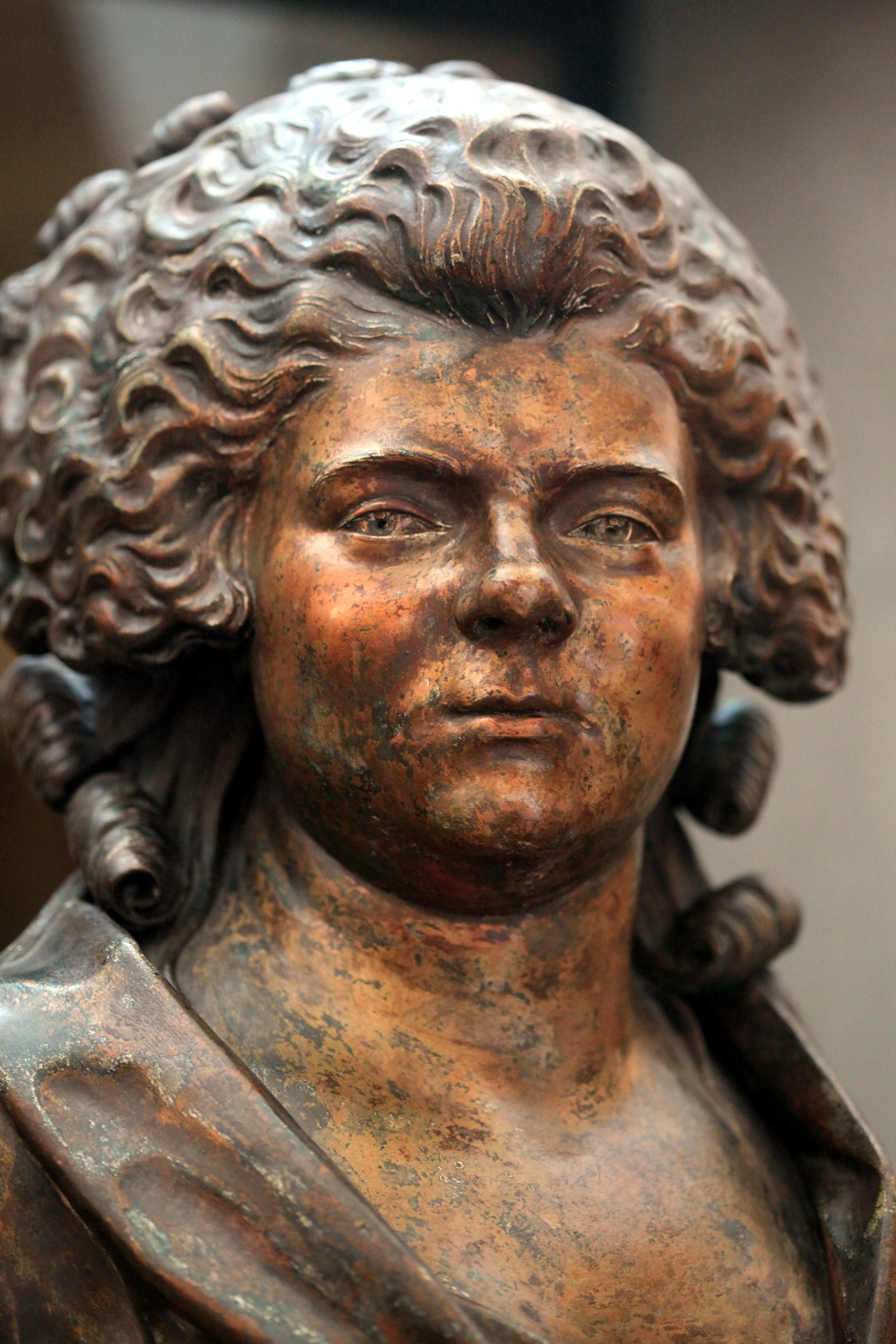
Bust of Antoinette Gabrielle Danton

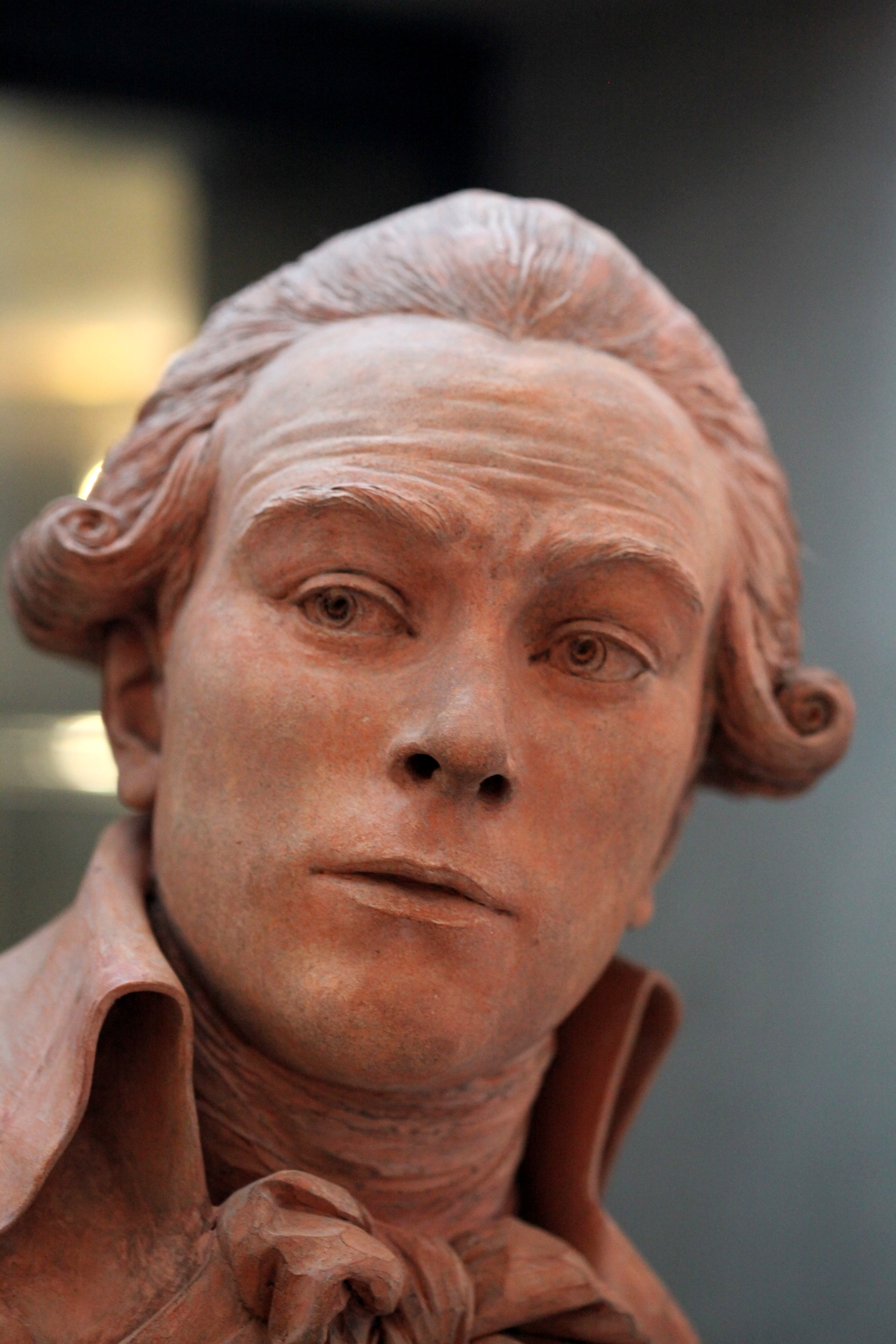
Bust of Robespierre (Musée de la Révolution française)
