= Claude Basire =

French revolutionary politician (1764–1794)

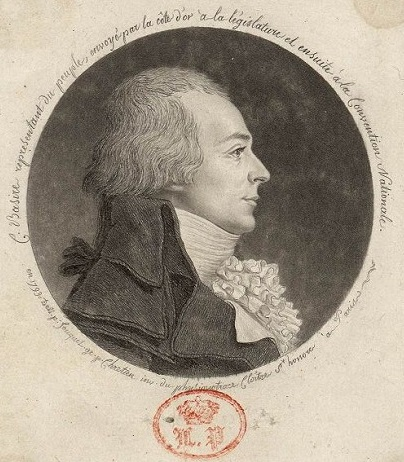
- Born: 1764; Dijon, Province of Burgundy, France
- Died: 5 April 1794 (aged 29–30); Paris
- Occupation: politician
- Known for: execution of Louis XVI

Claude Basire (French pronunciation: [klod baziʁ]; 1764 – 5 April 1794) was a French politician of the Revolutionary period. He was guillotined.

== Biography ==
Born in Dijon, in the Province of Burgundy, he became a deputy for the Côte-d'Or in the Legislative Assembly, he made himself prominent by denouncing the Bourbon and the Tuileries Palace's comité autrichien (“Austrian committee”, the purported Royalist group supporting the Austrians with whom the country was at war). On 20 June 1792, he spoke in favor of the deposition of King Louis XVI, though on 20 September he advised discussion before moving to decide in favour of abolition.

Elected to the National Convention, he affiliated with The Mountain, opposing the adjournment of the king's trial, and voting in favor of his execution. He joined the attack upon the Girondists, but, as member of the Committee of General Security, he condemned the Reign of Terror.

He was implicated by François Chabot in the falsification of a decree relative to the East India Company. Although his involvement seems only to have been that he failed to reveal the plot – of which he knew only part – he was nonetheless accused before the Revolutionary Tribunal at the same time as Georges Danton and Camille Desmoulins. He is memorialized by the street name Rue Claude Basire in central Dijon.
