= François Chabot =

French politician (1756–1794)

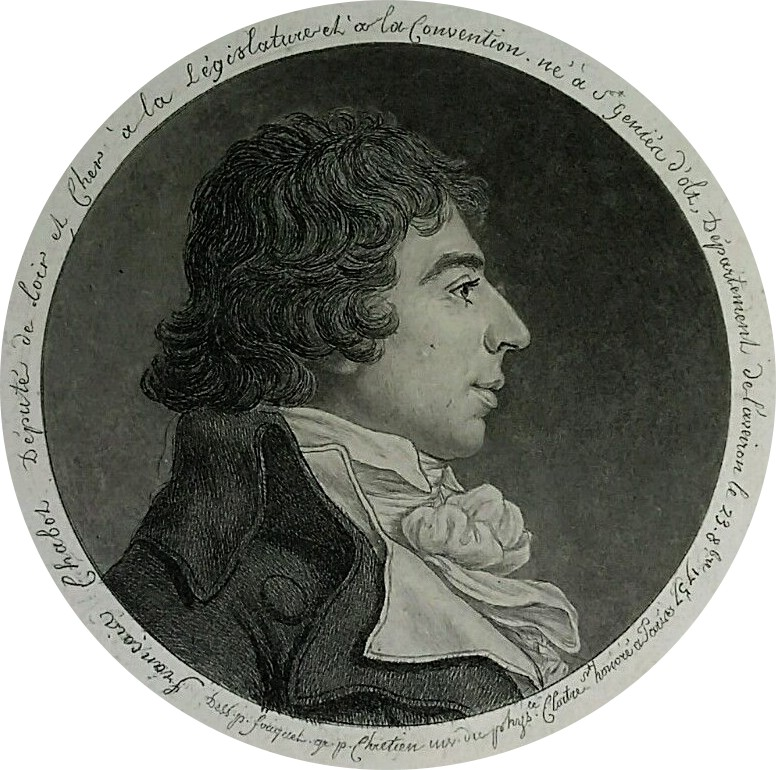
- Born: 23 October 1756; Saint-Geniez-d'Olt, Kingdom of France
- Died: 5 April 1794 (aged 37); Paris, French First Republic
- Cause of death: Guillotine
- Other name: Père Augustin
- Political party: Jacobins
- Other political affiliations: Cordeliers
- Movement: The Philosophes
- Spouse: Leopoldine Frey
- Father: Étienne Chabot

François Chabot (English: /ʃæˈboʊ/ sha-BOH, French: [fʁɑ̃swa ʃabo]; 23 October 1756 – 5 April 1794) was a French politician.

== Early life ==
Born in Saint-Geniez-d'Olt (Aveyron), Chabot became a Capuchin friar in Rodez before the French Revolution, while continuing to be attracted to the works of philosophes - the reason for which he was banned from preaching in the respective diocese.

After the Civil Constitution of the Clergy, he got married and continued to act as constitutional priest, becoming grand vicar of Henri Grégoire, bishop of Blois; he was also the founder of the Jacobin Club in Rodez. He was later elected to the Legislative Assembly, sitting at the far left, and forming with Claude Bazire and Antoine Christophe Merlin the "Cordelier Trio".

== Convention ==
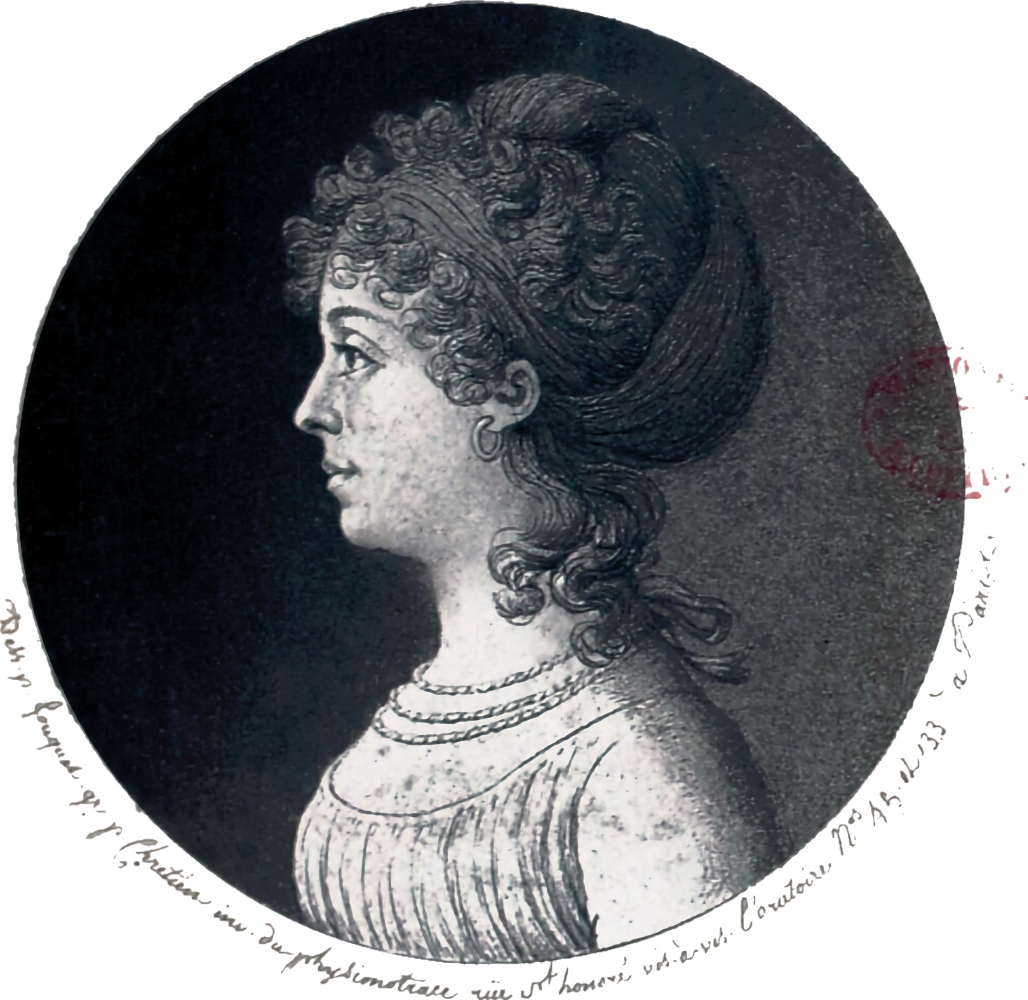
Portrait of Chabot’s wife Leopoldine Frey

Re-elected to the National Convention for the département of Loir-et-Cher, he voted for the execution of King Louis XVI, and opposed the proposal to prosecute the authors of the September Massacres, as there were heroes of the Battle of Jemappes among them.

In March 1793, Chabot arrived in Aveyron as one of two Representatives-on-mission to the department of Aveyron and the Tarn, the other being Jean-Baptiste Bô. As their first act, Chabot and Bô instituted a special commission for military recruitment from the region. Several days later, a war tax was instituted on the aristocrats and wealthy bourgeois. In an attempt to quell the specter of urban revolts (seen as parts of a single movement, and labelled by the Parisians as "federalism"), the two proceeded to suspend the democratic system, reserving the right to suspend or dismiss officials lacking in 'civic zeal'. Combined with crackdowns on local churches and the lifting of restrictions on governmental search and seizure, Chabot and Bô were infamous as two of the most activist Representatives-on-Mission in the country. On 5 May 1793, Chabot and Bô left their Aveyron commission; Chabot was reassigned to Toulouse, where his administration was quite similar.

On the 1st of November 1793, Chabot, speaking in the Jacobins explained why, from 1788 to 1793 freedom of the press "was necessary against tyranny" this was no longer true. Now, he claimed that France had a popular regime and the press would not be permitted to diverge from the proper path.

In November 1793, François Chabot was denounced by several members of the Convention, notably Fabre d'Eglantine, Jacques-René Hébert and Louis Pierre Dufourny de Villiers, on the grounds that he had attempted to falsify the finances of the French East India Company, offering bribes to various elected representatives in the process. Chabot claimed to Robespierre that he had been, of his own initiative, infiltrating a pre-existing plot to meddle with the finances of the French East India Company. The plot, Chabot claimed, was hatched by the known royalist, the Baron de Batz, with Hebert, Dufourny, and Claude Basire, a fellow Cordelier, as key accomplices, with the plot’s ultimate originator being William Pitt. Robespierre allowed Chabot to present his case before the Committee of General Security, from which he had been removed on suspicion of corruption one month earlier.

Little evidence was brought against Chabot in the counter-denunciation; the greater part of Dufourny’s speech on the floor concerned Chabot’s marriage to Leopoldine Frey, sister to Austrian-Jewish banker Junius Frey. Her nationality, along with the substantial dowry which Chabot received, was key in the discrediting of Chabot’s testimony. To quote Dufourney's testimony:

When Antoinette was on trial before the revolutionary tribunal, when the nation was at its maximum of execration for foreigners, when our brothers who were [fighting] on the frontiers left us widows to console, sisters and family to succor, it was then that Chabot made a marriage of interests with an Autrichienne!

In Dufourny's version of the East India scandal, Chabot and his close associates were working with the Baron de Batz, who had previously been accused of offering a bounty for the rescue of Marie Antoinette, on behalf of members of the Austrian royalty. Batz had proposed turning Chabot and other leading figures of the Revolution against each other by using or fabricating financial conflicts.

== Execution ==
Compromised both in the falsification of the decree suppressing the East India Company and in the plot to bribe certain members of the Convention, Chabot was arrested and brought before the Revolutionary Tribunal. He was sentenced to death and guillotined at the same time as the Dantonists, who protested their association with a fripon ("loafer").

Claude Basire and Fabre d'Eglantine, accused by Chabot of involvement in the East India Company Scandal, and Chabot's brother-in-law Junius Frey were also executed alongside him.

== Quotes ==
- Christ was the first "sans-culotte".
- "What is my law, you ask? I answer: the natural law, the one saying: Poor people, seek the rich; girls, seek the boys. Follow your instincts".
