= Antoinette Gabrielle Charpentier =

Wife of the French Revolutionary leader Georges Jacques Danton

Antoinette Gabrielle Danton
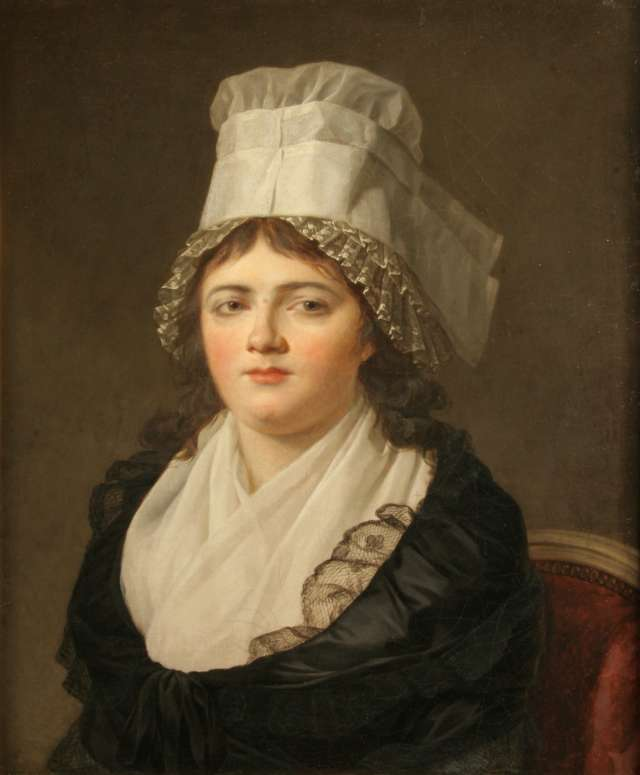
- Antoinette Gabrielle Danton, painted by Jacques-Louis David, 1793 (Troyes, musée d'art d'archéologie et de sciences naturelles).

Personal details
- Born: Antoinette Gabrielle Charpentier c. 1762 Paris, Kingdom of France
- Died: 10 February 1793 Paris, First French Republic
- Cause of death: Death in childbirth
- Spouse: Georges Jacques Danton (m. 1787)

Antoinette Gabrielle Danton (née Charpentier); (c. 1762 – 10 February 1793) was the first wife of the French Revolutionary leader Georges Jacques Danton.

== Biography ==
Antoinette Gabrielle Charpentier was the daughter of Jérôme François Charpentier, owner of the Café Parnasse or Café de l'École, located since 1773 on the site of the current La Samaritaine store in Paris. She married Georges Jacques Danton on 14 June 1787 at the church of l'Saint-Germain-l'Auxerrois à Paris. The marriage resulted in the births of four children:

1. François Danton, born in May 1788 in Paris, died 24 April 1789 in Arcis-sur-Aube (Aube) at the age of 11 months;
2. Antoine Danton, born 18 June 1790 in Paris and baptized the same day in the church of Saint-Sulpice, died on 14 June 1858 at Arcis-sur-Aube (Aube), wife Sophie Rivière (1803–1848). The couple had a daughter, Sophie Octavie Danton (1828–1897) who married Louis Menuel, and they have descendants to this day from their son Georges-André Menuel (1852–1906);
3. François-Georges Danton, born 2 February 1792 in Paris, and baptized the same day at the Church of Saint-André-des-Arts de Paris, died without issue on 18 June 1848 at Arcis-sur-Aube (Aube);
4. Unnamed (boy) Danton, born dead in 1793, whose birth led to the death of his mother on 10 February 1793.

François-Georges Danton and his exact contemporary Horace Camille Desmoulins (1792–1825) were raised by a wet-nurse from L'Isle-Adam.

On 10 February 1793, while Danton was on mission in Belgium, Antoinette Gabrielle Danton died in Paris giving birth to her fourth son, who did not live. On his return to Paris on 17 February 1793, Georges Danton found an artiste from the faubourg Saint-Marceau, the sculptor Claude André Deseine, who was deaf and mute, and took him (in exchange for a bundle of assignats), to the Sainte-Catherine cemetery where his wife was buried.

In the middle of the night, with the cemetery caretaker's aide, Georges Danton had his wife Antoinette Gabrielle disinterred and her coffin opened, covering her with kisses and imploring her to pardon him for his many sexual indiscretions, and had a death mask taken. The mortuary bust of Antoinette Gabrielle Danton, which caused a scandal when first exhibited in the year of her death, is now visible in the museum in Troyes in Aube.

Georges Jacques Danton remarried Louise Sébastienne Gély (1776–1856) on 1 July 1793. She was a friend of the couple who took care of their children.
