= Jean-François Delacroix =

French politician

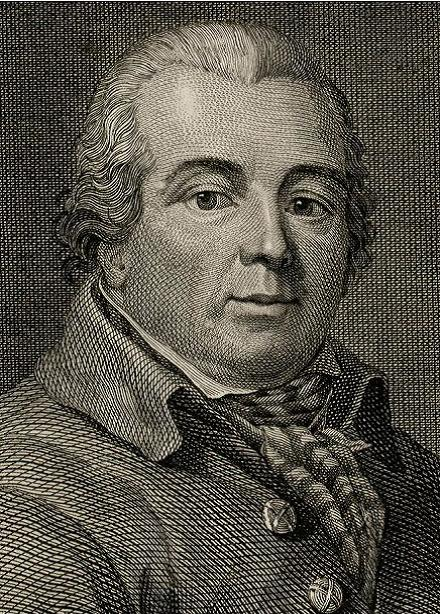
- Jean-François Delacroix

2nd President of the National Convention
- In office 4–18 October 1792
- Preceded by: Jérôme Pétion de Villeneuve
- Succeeded by: Marguerite-Élie Guadet

National Legislative Assembly

Deputy
- In office 1791–1792
- Constituency: Eure-et-Loir

National Convention

Deputy
- In office 1792–1794
- Constituency: Eure-et-Loir

Personal details
- Born: 3 April 1753 Pont-Audemer, Kingdom of France
- Died: 5 April 1794 (aged 41) Paris, France
- Cause of death: Execution by Guillotine
- Party: The Mountain
- Occupation: Lawyer; Politician

Jean-François de Lacroix or Delacroix (French pronunciation: [ʒɑ̃ fʁɑ̃swa dəlakʁwa]; 3 April 1753 – 5 April 1794) was a French politician and member of the Committee of Public Safety. He was known as "Lacroix of Eure-et-Loir" and was guillotined in 1794.

== Life ==
Son of a surgeon, Jean-François Lacroix served in a body of police, which, according to the count of Espinchal he was "chased". Having studied law, he became a lawyer and settled in Anet near Dreux where he served the tax judge. In 1782 he married Marie-Louise de La Barre, daughter of Nicolas Landes. Landes Barre, a tax attorney and justice of the Bailiwick of Water and Forestry of the Principality of Anet who bore him a son, Jean Born in Anet, 28 February 1783. In his unpublished notes, Count Espinchal said he had married "rich" and "die of grief was his first wife."

=== From magistracy to the Jacobins ===
He became attorney general trustee of Eure-et-Loir in 1789 and then in 1791 he was appointed deputy judge at Supreme Court for the same department. The 28 August 1791 he was chairman of the electoral assembly of Eure-et-Loir when he was elected MP for his department to the Legislative. Coming to Paris at the time of the split of the Jacobin Club he was pressed by Charles Lameth to join the club of the Feuillants. Affiliated to the Jacobin Club he remained opposed to the old regime policies. Tall and handsome, he befriended Georges-Jacques Danton and they shared the expensive lifestyle, supported in part by government contracts, including one with François Lanchères who ran a large company of military transports and whom the Minister of War Narbonne had entrusted to supply artillery horses.

In the legislature, Jean-François Lacroix raised various motions against royal ministers, the court and the king and he was said to have been the first who described the parties of the Assembly using the terms "right, middle, left" to refer to the liberal, moderate and radical divisions of the assembly. On 6 October 1791, he asked the Vice President of the Assembly to be called to order after he described Louis XVI as "sovereign" and two days later he attacked the minister Montmorin, causing his resignation.

On 5 February 1792 he named Louis XVI as the cause of all troubles in refusing to sanction the decrees relating to non-juring priests and on 13 March asked for the confiscation of property of emigrants. Madame Roland, in her Memoirs, advanced very serious charges of duplicity.

=== From entry into the Committee to execution ===
He entered the Committee of Public Safety and spoke strongly against the Girondins contributing to the Insurrection of 31 May – 2 June 1793. It was a way to deceive and chase away the suspicions of the Jacobins, who asked him to explain his missions to Dumouriez in Belgium and the dilapidations of which he was accused. To avoid having to justify sums newly fallen into his wallet, he married his new mistress setting up for himself, 4 June 1793, with the notary Viennot at Vincennes, a dowry of 350,400 pounds. Mme. Roland, very well informed, said that this business of justifying the source of funds found an appeasement with the elimination of the Girondins so much longed for; "There exist," she wrote from prison, "in the hands of the former Chairman of the Department of Eure, two letters of Lacroix, formerly tax judge at Anet. As for one of them, it makes a bid of five hundred thousand pounds for some of the national assets. For the other, it withdraws his bid and gives his withdrawal based on the decree which requires Members to justify the growth in their assets since the Revolution. But this decree has not run since the inconvenient twenty-two (Girondins) were expelled."

Before having to make a serious accounting, he still could, with his friend Danton, propose and bring to a vote on 16 Pluviose Year II (4 February 1794) the abolition of slavery of blacks in the colonies, saying that the Convention should not "dishonor itself by a long discussion", and so the Convention passed the law by acclamation. He also caused to be decreed on 19 Ventose Year II (9 March 1794), the arrest of slave-owning white settlers present in France who were intriguing against the execution of the decree.

== Sources ==
- (in French) Pierre Caron
- (in French) Georges Champagne, Nicolas Bonnet, Documents pour servir à l’histoire de Nicolas Bonnet, Dreux, Lefebvre-Marnay, 1902, p. 45.
