= List of political groups in the French Revolution =

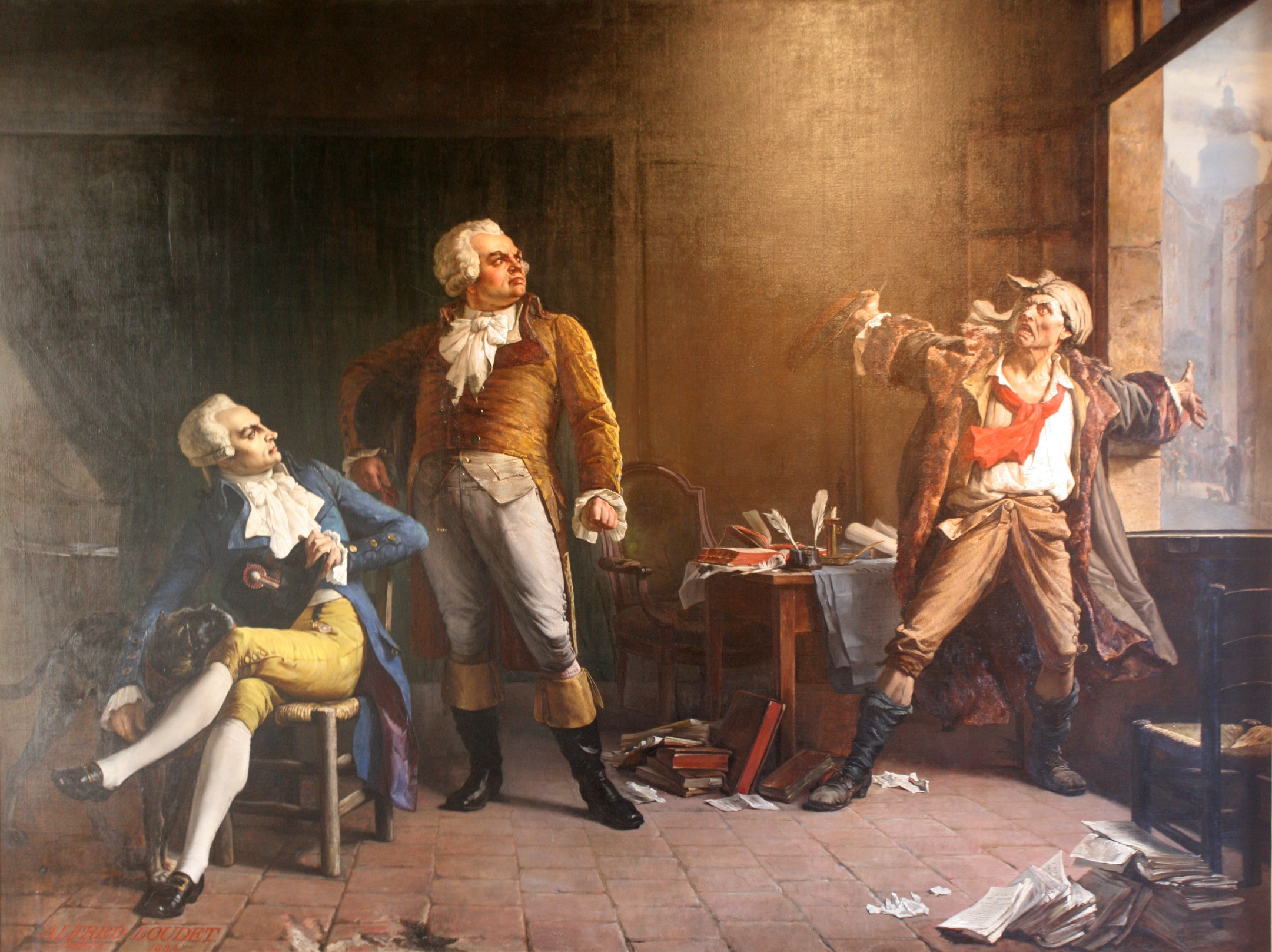
Maximilien Robespierre, Georges Danton and Jean-Paul Marat in a portrait by Alfred Loudet, 1882 (Musée de la Révolution française)

During the French Revolution (1789–1799), multiple differing political groups, clubs, organizations, and militias arose, which could often be further subdivided into rival factions. Every group had its own ideas about what the goals of the Revolution were and which course France (and surrounding countries) should follow. They struggled to carry out these plans at the cost of other groups. Various groups played an important role, such as citizens' clubs, parliamentarians, governmental institutions, and paramilitary movements.

- Royalists: the term most commonly given to a wide range of supporters of the Ancien Régime who sought to reverse most changes of the Revolution and restore the royal House of Bourbon and the Catholic Church to its pre-1789 authority. Some armed themselves and formed rebel armies, especially in Western France, under the name of Catholic and Royal Army (also called Chouans, see also the Chouannerie), the most important battleground being the War in the Vendée (1793–1796). Others fled France as émigrés, some of whom would also arm themselves and form the Armée des Émigrés (1792–1814), who together with the troops of the First Coalition and Second Coalition sought to bring down the French Republic and restore the Bourbon monarchy.
- Jacobins (originally the Society of Friends of the Constitution, but better known by their home base in the old Dominican convent of Saint Jacques, hence the name Jacobins; since 1792 officially Society of Jacobins): revolutionary club originally consisting of Breton delegates to the National Constituent Assembly founded in June 1789, which soon grew and branched out across France and welcomed non-parliamentarians as members starting in October. Due to the high membership fee, the club remained elitist, initially shifting to the right. In Spring 1790, the radical leftist Cordeliers seceded, and in July 1791, the right-wing Feuillants also split themselves off. Together with the Cordeliers, the Jacobin left-wing would eventually come to be known as The Mountain while the right wing of the Jacobins would become known as the Girondins. From 1790 onwards, Maximilien Robespierre would become increasingly dominant within the Jacobin Club and from July 1793 until July 1794 use it as his powerbase for the Reign of Terror, arresting and executing the leaders of both Cordelier factions, namely the radical leftist Hébertists (March 1794) as well as the centre-left Dantonists (April 1794). After the Fall of Maximilien Robespierre, the National Convention closed the Jacobin Club on 12 November 1794.
- Girondins (named after the Gironde department, where many of its prominent members came from; initially they were also called Brissotins after their leader Jacques Pierre Brissot): faction of liberal republicans who were primarily supported by the wealthy bourgeoisie from southern and western France. They consisted of the right wing of the Jacobins and were staunch defenders of the rights of man and popular sovereignty against a centralized state governed from Paris. The Girondins desired to export the Revolution to the rest of Europe and therefore urged on war with Austria and Prussia (20 April 1792). They played a central role in the fall of the monarchy (21 September 1792) and the execution of the deposed king, Louis XVI (21 January 1793). Faced with the rise of The Mountain, the Girondins showed increasingly royalist tendencies in the spring of 1793. They were overthrown by the Montagnard insurrection of 31 May – 2 June 1793 and their leaders were guillotined.
- The Plain (La Plaine), also pejoratively known as The Marsh (Le Marais) or Maraisards (Marsh-dwellers), was a container term for a large group of parliamentarians who held middle-ground views and inside the National Convention were seated on the lowest benches. Ideologically, they were most closely affiliated with the Girondins, but they barely dared to speak out against the radical Montagnards.
- The Mountain (La Montagne, also called the Montagnards, literally Mountain-dwellers, because they were seated on the highest benches in Parliament): grouping of radical and leftist politicians in the Legislative Assembly and National Convention (1792–1795). Their members came from the clubs of the Cordeliers and the left wing of the Jacobins and sought to establish a radical-democratic republic centrally governed from Paris. From June 1793 until July 1794, the Montagnards dominated French politics and the Reign of Terror was conducted under the leadership of Robespierre. Notably after their takeover in June 1793, The Mountain can be thought of as consisting of three rival factions that vied for control, namely the Hébertists (radical leftist Cordeliers), the Dantonists (moderate and more right-wing Cordeliers) and in between them Robespierre and his Jacobin followers (who together are sometimes called Robespierrists).
  The National Convention in 1792 The Plain The Mountain Girondins
- Society of 1789 (also known as the Patriotic Society of 1789): club of moderate conservative constitutional monarchists founded in May 1790. They merged with the Feuillants in 1791.
- Thermidorians: a group of Montagnards who conspired against Robespierre's regime and staged a coup d'état on 27 July 1794 (9 Thermidor Year II), known as the Thermidorian Reaction, which overthrew Robespierre and saw him and his associates executed two days later. As moderate republicans, the Thermidorians tried to calm down the Revolution and closed most Jacobin clubs across France. These events triggered the right-wing royalist and anti-revolutionary First White Terror, especially aimed against Montagnards and Jacobins in the Rhône valley and southern Brittany. However, a royalist coup d'état on 13 Vendémiaire (5 October 1795) was crushed by general Napoleon Bonaparte. With the Constitution of the Year III, the Thermidorians established the Directory as the executive power (replacing Robespierre's Committee of Public Safety) and replaced the National Convention by the Council of Five Hundred and the Council of Ancients, as the bicameral legislative power.
- Dantonists: right-wing of The Mountain. They are named after their leader Georges Danton, a cofounder of the Cordeliers Club and from April until July 1793 the de facto head of the French government. After Robespierre seized power, Danton (who reconciled with Catholicism) and his allies tried to moderate and stabilize the Revolution. However, this brought them into conflict with the radical leftist Hébertists who wished to push the Revolution even further. Robespierre had the Dantonist leaders (including Danton himself and Camille Desmoulins) arrested on 30 March 1794 and executed on 5 April 1794.
- Monarchiens (officially the Friends of the Monarchial Constitution, also Monarchial Club): club of center-right revolutionary monarchists founded in December 1789 by Jean Joseph Mounier. They merged with the Feuillants in 1791.
- Cordeliers (officially the Society of the Friends of the Rights of Man and of the Citizen, but better known by their home base in the old Franciscan Cordeliers Convent, hence Cordeliers): a radical-leftist club which split from the Jacobins in the spring of 1790 under the leadership of Georges Danton and Camille Desmoulins. Together with the radical left Jacobins, they constituted The Mountain in Parliament. Until his assassination on 13 July 1793, radical demagogue Jean-Paul Marat played an important role as well. Thereafter, the club was taken over by the Hébertists of Jacques Hébert. Shortly after the execution of the Hébertists leaders by Robespierre on 24 March 1794, the Cordeliers Club was closed down.
- Feuillants (official the Society of the Friends of the Constitution): club of centre-right constitutional monarchists who held the majority in parliament during the Legislative Assembly era (October 1791–September 1792). They split from the Jacobins on 16 July 1791 and disappeared after the Storming of the Tuileries (10 August 1792). Although enemies of the Ancien Régime, they also opposed democracy. They maintained that the establishment of the constitutional monarchy on 3 September 1791 had meant the French Revolution had achieved its goal and should be finished.
- Hébertists: radical left-wing of The Mountain primarily composed of Cordeliers. They are named for their leader Jacques Hébert and were outspoken atheists, anti-Christians, and republicans. They invented the Cult of Reason as an alternative Enlightened worldview to replace all religions. On 13 March 1794, the Hébertist leaders were arrested and they were executed on 24 March by the order of Robespierre.
- Enragés: radical left-wing of the Jacobin Club, which supported the demands of the radical sans-culottes and advocated for an early form of socialism, guided by direct democracy. Its leaders were arrested during the Reign of Terror and Jacques Roux committed suicide before trial, while the rest were banned from political activity.
- Equals: Former members of the Jacobin Club that agitated for the overthrow of the Directory in the wake of the Thermidorian Reaction. They advocated for an egalitarian and socialist republic, denouncing the new wealthy elites of France. Their conspiracy was uncovered and their members arrested, with the leader François-Noël Babeuf being executed.
- Society of the Friends of the Blacks: an abolitionist pressure group founded in 1788 by Jacques Pierre Brissot (later also the leader of the Girondins) just before the Revolution broke out. Although early revolutionaries would officially denounce slavery, this declaration was initially of little practical consequence. Not until the Haitian Revolution broke out in August 1791 did French politicians begin to seriously consider the factual abolition of slavery, which was eventually legislated on 4 February 1794. The gens de couleur libres (manumitted slaves) had already been granted civil rights on 4 April 1792.

== See also ==
- List of factions in the Mexican Revolution
- Modérantisme
- Radicalism (historical)
- Timeline of the French Revolution
