= The Mountain =

Political group during the French Revolution

The Mountain La Montagne
- Leaders: Maximilien Robespierre; Louis Antoine de Saint-Just; Georges Danton; Paul Barras; Bertrand Barère
- Founded: 1792; 234 years ago
- Dissolved: 1799; 227 years ago
- Succeeded by: Thermidorians (Faction)
- Headquarters: Tuileries Palace, Paris
- Newspaper: L'Ami du peuple; Le Vieux Cordelier; Le Père Duchesne
- Political club(s): Jacobin Club; Cordeliers Club
- Ideology: Centralisation; Dirigism; Jacobinism; Radicalism; Abolitionism; Egalitarianism; State nationalism; Factions: Robespierrists: Patriotism French nationalism Dantonists: Moderate Jacobinism
- Political position: Left-wing to far-left
- Colors: Red

The Mountain (French: La Montagne, pronounced [la mɔ̃taɲ]) was a political group during the French Revolution. Its members, called the Montagnards (French: [mɔ̃taɲaʁ]), sat on the highest benches in the National Convention. The term, first used during a session of the Legislative Assembly, came into general use in 1793. By the summer of 1793, the pair of opposed minority groups, the Montagnards and the Girondins, divided the National Convention. That year, the Montagnards were influential in what is commonly known as the Reign of Terror.

The Mountain was the left-leaning radical group and opposed the more right-leaning Girondins. Despite the fact that both groups of the Jacobin Club had virtually no difference with regard to the establishment of the French Republic, the aggressive military intentions of the rich merchant class-backed Girondins, such as conquering the Rhineland, Poland and the Netherlands with a goal of creating a protective ring of satellite republics in Great Britain, Spain, and Italy, and a potential war with Austria, enabled the Montagnards to take over the administrative power of the National Convention under the leadership of Maximilien Robespierre who openly advocated for a more peaceful external policy and rather focusing on the issues within the newly founded French First Republic. This sharp transition of power from Girondins to Montagnards was effected after Robespierre accused the former group of traitorous and counter-revolutionary activities as well as betraying the Republic, which resulted in the execution of fellow Revolutionists including considerably influential figures like Jacques Pierre Brissot, and later the former Montagnard Georges Jacques Danton.

The Mountain was composed mainly of members of the middle class but represented the constituencies of Paris. As such, the Mountain was sensitive to the motivations of the city and responded strongly to demands from the working-class sans-culottes. The Mountain operated on the belief that what was best for Paris would be best for all of France. Although they attempted some rural land reform, most of it was never enacted and they generally focused on the needs of the urban poor over that of rural France.

The Girondins were a moderate political faction created during the Legislative Assembly period. They were the political opponents of the more radical representatives within the Mountain. The Girondins had wanted to avoid the execution of Louis XVI and supported a constitution that would have allowed a popular vote to overturn legislation. The Mountain accused the Girondins of plotting against Paris because this caveat within the proposed constitution would have allowed rural areas of France to vote against legislation that benefits Paris, the main constituency of the Mountain; however, the real discord in the Convention occurred not between the Mountain and the Gironde but between the aggressive antics of the minority of the Mountain and the rest of the Convention.

The Mountain was not unified as a party and relied on leaders like Robespierre, Danton, and Jacques Hébert, who themselves came to represent different factions. Hébert, a journalist, gained a following as a radical patriot Montagnard (members who identified with him became known as the Hébertists) while Danton led a more moderate faction of the Mountain (followers came to be known as Dantonists). Regardless of the divisions, the nightly sessions of the Jacobin club, which met in the rue Saint-Honoré, can be considered to be a type of caucus for the Mountain. In June 1793, the Mountain successfully ousted most of the moderate Gironde members of the Convention with the assistance of radical sans-culottes.

Following their coup, the Mountain, led by Hérault de Séchelles, quickly began construction on a new constitution which was completed eight days later. The Committee of Public Safety reported the constitution to the Convention on 10 June and a final draft was adopted on 24 June. The process occurred quickly because as Robespierre, a prominent member of the Mountain, announced on 10 June the "good citizens demanded a constitution" and the "Constitution will be the reply of patriotic deputies, for it is the work of the Mountain". This constitution was never actually enacted, and the French Constitution of 1793 was also delayed due to the situation in the war and the Thermidorian Reaction that purged much of the government, and was eventually abandoned.

== History ==
=== Origins ===
It is difficult to pinpoint the conception of the Montagnard group because the lines which defined it were themselves quite nebulous early on. Originally, members of The Mountain were the men who sat in the highest rows of the Jacobin Clubs, loosely organized political debate clubs open to the public. Though members of the Montagnards were known for their commitment to radical political resolutions prior to 1793, the contours of political groups presented an ever-evolving reality that shifted in response to events. Would-be prominent Montagnard leaders like Jean-Baptiste Robert Lindet and Jean Bon Saint-André were tempted by early Girondin proposals and soon many moderates—even anti-radicals—felt the need to push for radical endeavors in light of threats both within and without the country. It was only after the trial of Louis XVI in December 1792, which united the Montagnards on a position of regicide, that the ideals and power of the group fully consolidated.

=== Rise and terror ===
The rise of Montagnards corresponds to the fall of the Girondins. The Girondins hesitated on the correct course of action to take with Louis XVI after his attempt to flee France on 20 June 1791. Some of the Girondins believed they could use the king as figurehead. While the Girondins hesitated, the Montagnards took a united stand during the trial in December 1792–January 1793 and favored the king's execution. On 24 February the Convention decreed the first albeit unsuccessful Levée en Masse, triggering uprisings in rural France as the Montagnards' influence waned in Marseille, Toulon, and Lyon. Riding on this victory, the Montagnards then sought to discredit the Girondins. They used tactics previously employed by the Girondins to denounce them as liars and enemies of the Revolution. They also formed a legislative committee in which Nicolas Hentz proposed a limitation of inheritances, gaining more support for the Montagnards. Girondin members were subsequently banned from the Jacobin club and excluded from the National Convention on 31 May – 2 June 1793.

=== Policies of the Mountain ===
Through attempted land redistribution policies, the Mountain showed some support for the rural poor. In August 1793, Montagnard member Jean Jacques Régis de Cambacérès drafted a piece of legislation which dealt with agricultural reform; in particular, he urged "relief from rent following harvest loss, compensation for improvements and fixity of tenure". This was in part to combat restlessness of share-croppers in the southwest. This draft never made it into law, but the drastic reforms suggest the Mountain's awareness of the need to please their base of support, both the rural and urban poor.

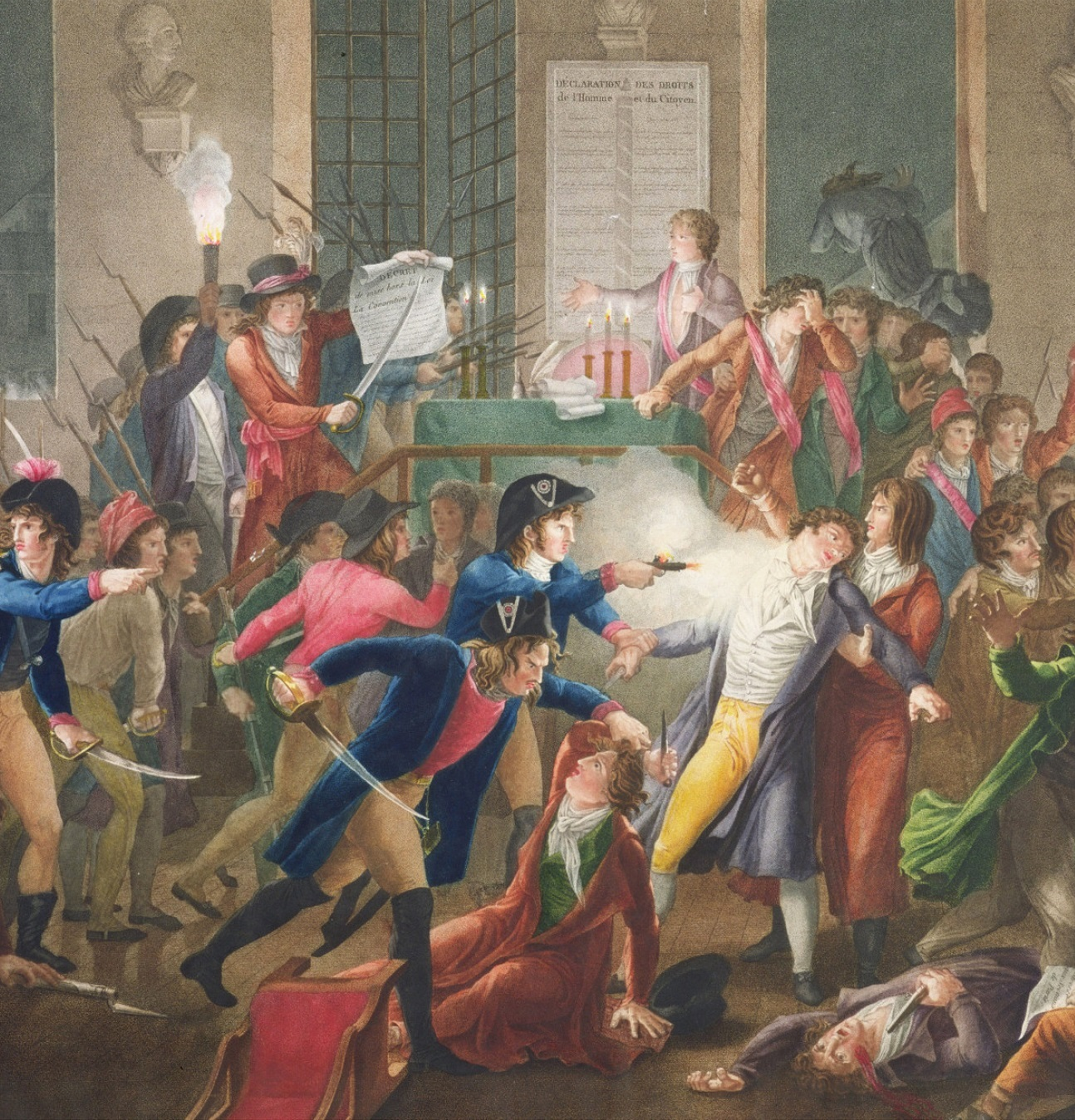
The arrest of Maximilien Robespierre and his allies showing at the centre of the image gendarme Merda firing at Robespierre (colour engraving by Jean-Joseph-François Tassaert after the painting by Fulchran-Jean Harriet, Carnavalet Museum)

Other policies aimed at supporting the poor included price controls enacted by the Mountain in 1793, called the General Maximum. The law was supported by a group in the Mountain called the Enragés, and it fixed prices and wages throughout France. At the same time, bread prices were rising as the commodity became scarce, and in an initiative spearheaded by Collot d'Herbois and Billaud-Varenne, a law was enacted in July 1793 that forbade the hoarding of "daily necessities". The hoarding of grain became a crime punishable by death.

Other economic policies enacted by the Mountain included an embargo on the export of French goods. As a result of this embargo, France was essentially unable to trade with foreign markets and the import of goods effectively ended. In theory, this protected French markets from foreign goods and required French people to support French goods. In addition to the embargo against foreign goods, Act 1651, passed by the Mountain in October 1793, further isolated France from the rest of Europe by forbidding any foreign vessels from trading along the French coast. The Mountain also enacted policies restricting and granting religious freedom. These policies varied but began with a ban on religion, allowing only for "the worship of Reason" in 1793 and progressing to religious freedom with the separation of Church and State in 1795.

=== Decline and fall ===
The fall and exclusion of the Montagnards from the National Convention began with the collapse of the Revolution's radical phase and the death of Robespierre on 10 Thermidor (28 July 1794). While the Montagnards celebrated unity, there was growing heterogeneity within the group as the Committee of Public Safety extended themselves with their tight control over the military and their extreme opposition to corruption in the government. Their extension drew the ire of other revolutionary leaders and a number of plots coalesced on 9 Thermidor (Thermidorian Reaction) when collaborators with the more moderate group the Dantonists acted in response to fears that Robespierre planned to execute them.

The purge of Robespierre was strongly similar to previous measures employed by the Montagnards to expel factions, such as the Girondins. However, as Robespierre was widely considered the heart of the Montagnards, his death symbolized their collapse. Few desired to take on the name of Montagnards afterwards, leaving around only about 100 men. Finally, at the end of 1794 the Mountain largely devolved into a group called the Crêtois (English: Crest), which lacked any real power.

== Factions and prominent members ==
The Mountain was born in 1792, with the merger of two prominent left-wing clubs: the Jacobins and Cordeliers. The Jacobins were initially moderate republicans and the Cordeliers were radical populist. In late 1792, Danton and his supporters wanted a reconciliation with the Girondins, which caused a break with Robespierre. After the trial of Girondins in 1793, Danton became strongly moderate while Robespierre and his allies continued their more radical policies. The moderates of Danton were also rival to the followers of Jacques Hébert who wanted the persecution of all non-Montagnards and the dechristianisation of France. When the Robespierrist and unaligned Montagnards eliminated first the Hébertists (March 1794) and then the Dantonistes (April 1794), these groups held the most influence in The Mountain. This was until the Thermidorian Reaction, when several conspirators supported by The Plain instituted a coup d'état. They executed Robespierre and his supporters and split from The Mountain to form the Thermidorian Left. The Montagnards that survived were arrested, executed or deported. By 1795 the Mountain had effectively been marginalized.

Robespierrists

- Maximilien Robespierre
- Louis Antoine de Saint-Just
- Georges Couthon
- Pierre-François-Joseph Robert
- Augustin Robespierre
- Jacques-Louis David
- Pierre Choderlos de Laclos
- Louis-Michel le Peletier
- François Hanriot
- Jean-Baptiste de Lavalette
- Jean-Baptiste Fleuriot-Lescot
- Antoine Simon
- René Levasseur
- Gilbert Romme
- Jean-Marie Claude Alexandre Goujon
- Félix Lepeletier
- Claude-François de Payan
- François Nicolas Anthoine
- Jeanbon Saint-André
- Marc-Antoine Jullien de Paris
- Marc-Antoine Jullien
- Lucien Bonaparte

Hébertists

- Jacques Hébert
- Pierre Gaspard Chaumette
- Jean-Paul Marat (supporter)
- Jean-Baptiste-Joseph Gobel
- Anacharsis Cloots
- François Chabot
- Jean Baptiste Noël Bouchotte
- Stanislas-Marie Maillard
- François-Nicolas Vincent
- Antoine-François Momoro
- Charles-Philippe Ronsin
- Joseph Le Bon
- Jean-Baptiste Carrier
- Jean-Nicolas Pache (Formerly a Girondin)
- Claude Javogues

Indulgents

- Georges Danton
- Camille Desmoulins (Formerly a Robespierrist)
- Fabre d'Églantine
- Julien of Toulouse
- François Louis Bourdon
- Louis Legendre
- Antoine Marie Charles Garnier
- Antoine Christophe Merlin
- Louis-Marie Stanislas Fréron
- Pierre Philippeaux
- François Joseph Westermann
- Edme-Bonaventure Courtois
- Jacques-Alexis Thuriot de la Rosière
- Marie-Jean Hérault de Séchelles

Independent Montagnards

- Pierre Joseph Cambon
- Edmond Louis Alexis Dubois-Crancé
- Jean Francois Rewbell
- Lazare Carnot (Formerly a Plain)
- Philippe-Antoine Merlin de Douai (Formerly a Plain)
- Henri Grégoire (Formerly a Plain)
- Paul Barras (Formerly a Robespierrist, later founder of the Thermidorians)
- Pierre Louis Prieur (Close to Robespierre)
- Claude-Antoine Prieur-Duvernois (Formerly a Plain)
- Elie Lacoste
- Marc-Guillaume Alexis Vadier
- Armand-Joseph Guffroy (Formerly a Robespierrist)
- Claude Basire
- Francois Chabot
- Joseph Fouché (Later a member Thermidorians)
- Jean-Lambert Tallien
- Jacques Nicolas Billaud-Varenne
- Bertrand Barère

== Electoral results ==
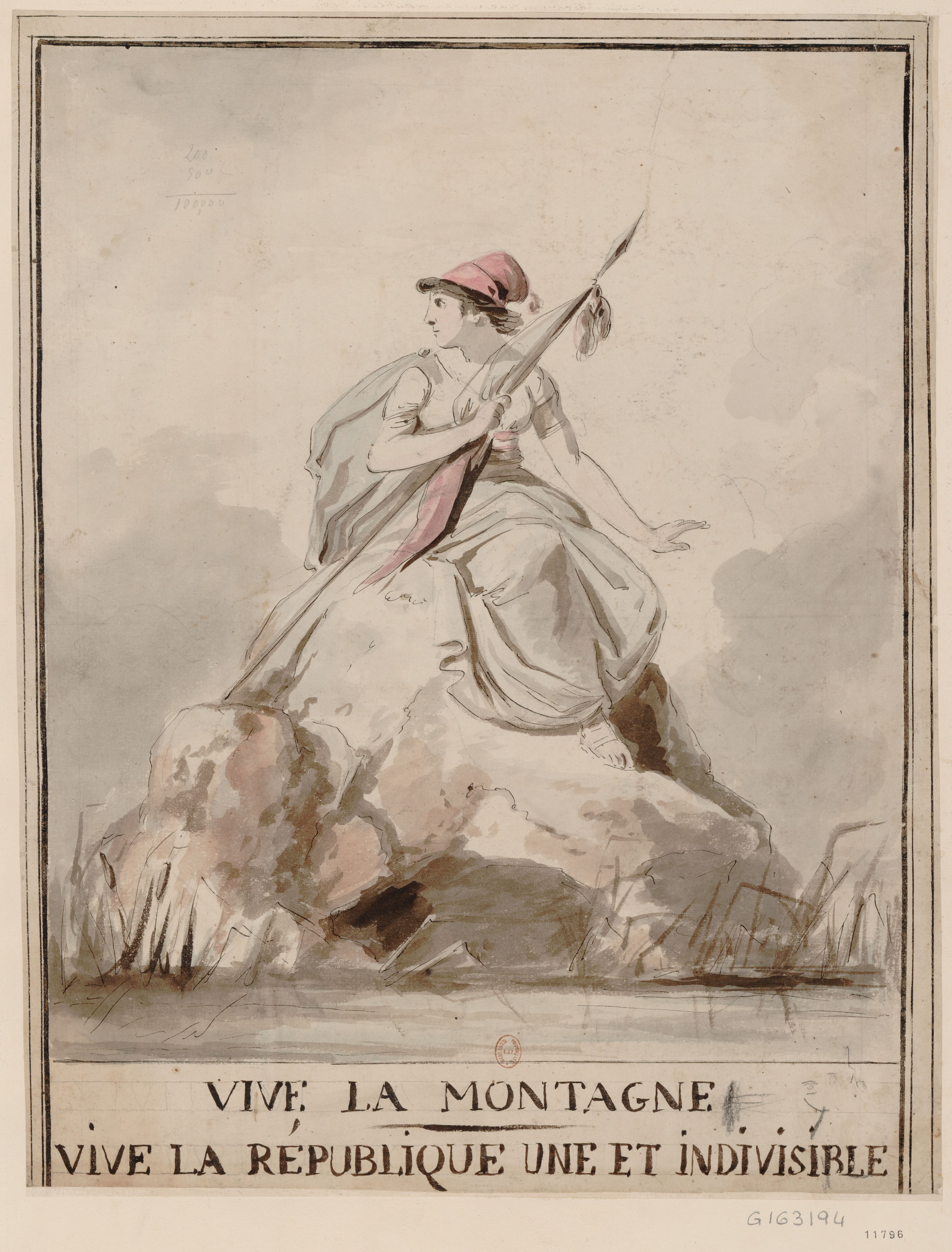
Pro-Montagnard art

Election year	No. of overall votes	% of overall vote	No. of overall seats won	+/–	Leader
National Convention
1792	907,200 (2nd)	26.7	200 / 749	▲64	Maximilien Robespierre
Legislative Body
1795	Did not participate	Did not participate	64 / 750	▼136	
1797	Did not participate	Did not participate	Unknown		
1798	Unknown (1st)	70.7	175 / 750	▲111	Marie-Joseph Chénier
Council of Five Hundred
1799	Unknown (1st)	48.0	240 / 500	▲65	Jean Debry

== See also ==
- Anti-clericalism
- Crêtois
- Left-wing populism
- Liberalism and radicalism in France
- Port-de-la-Montagne, punishing name for Toulon after the 1793 siege of Toulon
- Republicanism
- Socialism in France
- The Mountain (1849)

== Bibliography ==
- François Furet and Mona Ozouf. A Critical Dictionary of the French Revolution. (Belknap Press, 1989).
- Jeremy D. Popkin, A Short History of the French Revolution, 5th ed. (Pearson, 2009).
- Marisa Linton, Choosing Terror: Virtue, Friendship, and Authenticity in the French Revolution. (Oxford University Press, 2013).
- Morris Slavin. The Making of an Insurrection: Parisian Sections and the Gironde. (Harvard University Press, 1986).
- Peter Kropotkin, Trans. N. F. Dryhurst The Great French Revolution, 1789–1793. (New York: Vanguard Printings, 1927).
- Peter McPhee, Robespierre: A Revolutionary Life. (Yale University Press, 2012).
- Robert J. Alderson, This Bright Era of Happy Revolutions: French Consul Michel-Ange-Bernard Mangourit and International Republicanism in Charleston, 1792-1794. (University of South Carolina Press, 2008).
- Voerman, Jan, The Reign of Terror. (Andrews University Press, 2009).
- "Mountain (the Mountain)". Collins English Dictionary Online. Retrieved 24 May 2014.
- "Montagnard (French history)". Encyclopædia Britannica Online. Retrieved 8 May 2014.
