= René Levasseur =

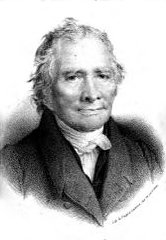

Member of the National Convention
- In office 6 September 1792 – 26 October 1795
- Constituency: Sarthe

Personal details
- Born: 27 May 1747 Sainte-Croix, Le Mans, France
- Died: 17 September 1834 (aged 87) Le Mans, France
- Party: Montagnard
- Profession: Surgeon

René Levasseur (27 May 1747 – 17 September 1834) was a French surgeon and politician, who was a Montagnard deputy in the National Convention during the French First Republic.

== Early life ==
Levasseur was a surgeon and man-midwife under the Ancien Régime. He was disinherited by one of his uncles for his political radicalism.

== National Convention ==
After the French Revolution, Levasseur served on the municipal government of Le Mans in 1790 and the district government in 1791. In the 1792 election to the new National Convention he won a seat representing the département of Sarthe. At the 1793 trial of Louis XVI, Levasseur voted in favour of his execution. He supported the creation of the Revolutionary Tribunal and was among the fiercest opponents of Modérantisme, especially in the insurrection of 31 May – 2 June 1793, supporting the arrest of all Girondins. He served in the Army of the North and his horse was shot from under him at the Battle of Hondschoote. He was tasked with restoring order in Beauvais and Oise, but was considered too moderate and André Dumont was sent to assist him. Maximilien Robespierre replaced him in November 1793 when disturbances erupted in Gonesse.

Levasseur voted for the Law of 4 February 1794, which abolished slavery in France. In 1794 he opposed the Dantonists and was sent to restore order in the département of Ardennes. He returned to Paris after the Fall of Robespierre, opposed the Thermidorean Reaction, and took part in the insurrection of 12 Germinal, Year III, for which the Convention imprisoned him until the amnesty at its dissolution in 1795.

== Later life ==
Levasseur returned to practising as a surgeon during the Directory, Consulate and Empire (1795–1814). He went into exile during the Bourbon Restoration, returning to France for the Hundred Days (1815) and again after the July Revolution of 1830. He died in Le Mans. Four volumes of memoirs were published under his name (1829–1831) which were prosecuted for offending the monarchy and religion. At the trial, Achille Roche, putative editor of the memoirs, was regarded as the author. Karl Marx read the memoirs for a planned history of the convention.

== Legacy ==
Levasseur is commemorated in Le Mans by boulevard René Levasseur, and an obelisk in the main cemetery visited in 1943 by Ernst Jünger. A bronze statue erected in 1911 was melted down in World War Two to reuse the metal. Sarthe departmental archives marked the 220th anniversary of the abolition of slavery with an exhibition on Levasseur.

== Bibliography ==
- Dissertation sur la Symphyséotomie et sur l’enclavement, Bruxelles, 1822
- Mémoires de R. Levasseur, (de la Sarthe) ex-conventionnel. Tome premier; Tome deuxième; Tome troisième, Paris: A Levavasseur, 1829–1834
