= Modérantisme =

Moderate faction in the French Revolution

During the French Revolution, modérantisme (French: [mɔdeʁɑ̃tism]) or the faction des modérés (faction of the moderates) was the name the Montagnards gave to their relatively more moderate opponents, first the Girondins and then the Dantonists. Modérantisme was denounced before the Jacobin and the Cordeliers clubs, who then led the first attacks on it in 1794.

Jacobin and Cordelier orators soon demanded that the guillotine be used against those they saw as trying to stop the Revolution. One day, Carrier shouted "The monsters! They want to break down the scaffolds – but, citizens, never forget, those who want no guillotines are those who should feel that they are worthy of the guillotine!". Camille Desmoulins, who came to found the newspaper le Vieux Cordelier in which he begged for clemency with Georges Danton's consent, from then on laid himself open to their hatred and vengeance.

On 5 April 1794, the leaders of the moderate party were guillotined and modérantisme was returned to power after Maximilien Robespierre's fall and its turn was to once again hold sway against the Montagnards who still supported Robespierre, with the Thermidorian Reaction done in the name of modérantisme. The crimes committed in Le Midi were also committed by men who claimed the title of modérés, although this did not stop them carrying out excessive acts of violence.

== Sources ==
- Elphège Boursin and Augustin Challamel (1893). Dictionnaire de la révolution française. Paris: Jouvet et cie. p. 351.
