= Pierre-François-Joseph Robert =

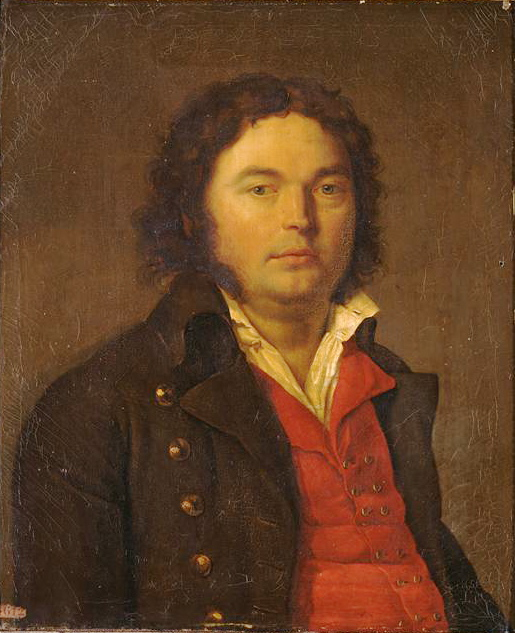
Portrait by Jean-Louis Laneuville

Pierre-François-Joseph Robert (French: [pjɛʁ fʁɑ̃swa ʒozɛf ʁɔbɛʁ]; 21 January 1763 – 13 April 1826) was a lawyer, politician and professor of public law at the société philosophique, journalist. He was born in Gimnée in the Prince-Bishopric of Liège and died in Brussels.

== Life ==
Robert was secretary to Georges Danton for a time, and was above all interested in financial affairs, working as a munitions supplier to the French army until 1808. He was the son of Jean-François Robert and Catherine Douhomme. He married Louise-Félicité de Kéralio and their daughter, Adélaïde Robert, married the famous Belgian musicologist François-Joseph Fétis.

In July 1790 he was one of the founders of the Cordeliers Club, and was also inscribed among the members of the Société des amis de la Constitution, the Société Fraternelle des Jacobins and the Club des indulgents. In April 1791, he became president of the Cordeliers and, under his influence, women were admitted. In May 1791, François Robert was in charge of federating the popular societies within a central committee, of which he was elected president - however, the Jacobins refused to adhere to his central committee. He was himself elected to the National Convention as deputy for Paris and voted for the death of Louis XVI on 20 January 1793. Thus, on the Bourbon Restoration, he was forced to leave France in 1815 and ended up as a liqueur merchant in Belgium, though he was named sub-prefect of Rocroi during the Hundred Days.
