= Cordeliers =

1790–1794 populist political club during the French Revolution

Cordeliers Club Club des Cordeliers
- "Open-eye" logo used in some Cordelier publications
- Presidents: Georges Danton (1790–1791); Pierre-François-Joseph Robert (1791–1792); Jacques Hébert (1792–1794)
- Founders: Georges Danton; Camille Desmoulins
- Founded: 27 April 1790; 236 years ago
- Dissolved: 20 February 1795; 231 years ago
- Headquarters: Cordeliers Convent, Paris
- Newspaper: Le Vieux Cordelier (Dantonists); Le Père Duchesne (Hébertists)
- Ideology: Jacobinism; Populism; Direct democracy Radicalism
- Political position: Left-wing to far-left
- National affiliation: The Mountain (1792–1794)
- Colours
- Slogan: Liberté, égalité, fraternité ("Liberty, equality, fraternity")

Party flag

The Society of the Friends of the Rights of Man and of the Citizen (French: Société des Amis des droits de l'homme et du citoyen [sɔsjete dez‿ami de dʁwa də lɔm e dy sitwajɛ̃]), mainly known as Cordeliers Club (French: Club des Cordeliers [klœb de kɔʁdəlje]), was a populist political club during the French Revolution from 1790 to 1794, when the Reign of Terror ended and the Thermidorian Reaction began.

The club campaigned for universal male suffrage and direct democracy, including the referendum. It energetically served as a watchdog looking for signs of abuse of power by the men in power. By 1793, it was challenging the centralization of power by Robespierre and his Committee of Public Safety. They responded by arresting the leadership, charging them with conspiring to overthrow the Convention. The leaders were guillotined, and the club disappeared.

== History ==
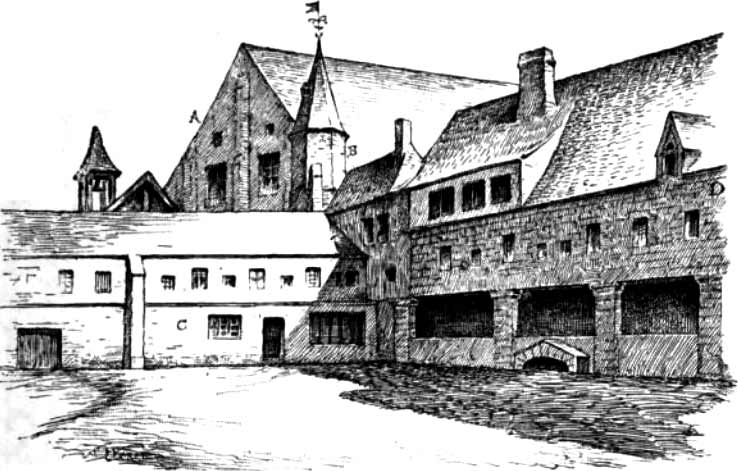
The Cordeliers Convent in 1793

The club had its origins in the Cordeliers district, a famously radical area of Paris called, by Camille Desmoulins, "the only sanctuary where liberty has not been violated". Under the leadership of Georges Danton, this district had played a significant role in the Storming of the Bastille and was home to several notable figures of the Revolution, including Danton himself, Desmoulins and Jean-Paul Marat—on whose behalf the district placed itself in a state of civil rebellion, when in January 1790 it refused to allow the execution of a warrant for his arrest that had been issued by the Châtelet.

Having issued in November 1789 a declaration affirming its intent to "oppose, as much as we are able, all that the representatives of the Commune may undertake that is harmful to the general rights of our constituents", the Cordeliers district remained in conflict with the Parisian government throughout the winter and spring of 1790. In May and June 1790, the previous division of Paris into 60 districts was by decree of the National Assembly replaced by the creation of 48 sections. This restructuring abolished the Cordeliers district.

Anticipating this dissolution, the leaders of the Cordeliers district founded in April 1790 the Société des Amis des droits de l’homme et du citoyen, a popular society which would serve as an alternative means of pursuing the goals and interests of the district. This society held its meetings in the Cordeliers Convent and quickly became known as the Club des Cordeliers. It took as its motto the phrase Liberté, égalité, fraternité, and because its aim was to keep an eye on the government its emblem was an open eye.

The membership fees of this society were fixed low and thus affordable to a more diverse range of citizens than those of many other political clubs at the time, including the Jacobin Club. There were no other restrictions on membership. The Cordeliers presented themselves as exceptionally populist and they prided themselves on counting working men and women among their members. A contemporary account describes one meeting:

About three hundred persons of both sexes filled the place; their dress was so unkempt and so filthy that one would have taken them for a gathering of beggars. The Declaration of the Rights of Man was stuck on the wall, crowned by crossed daggers. Plaster busts of Brutus and William Tell were placed on each side, as if expressly to guard the Declaration. Facing, behind the tribune, as supporters, there appeared busts of Mirabeau and Helvétius, with Rousseau in the middle.

However, the preponderance of Cordeliers were members of the bourgeoisie and its leadership was largely drawn from the educated middle classes.

From 1791 the Cordeliers met in a hall in the Rue Dauphine. On 21 June of that year, following an attempt by the royal family to flee Paris, the Cordeliers moved to draft a petition which offered the National Assembly a choice between the immediate deposition of Louis XVI or a national referendum on the future of the monarchy. The Cordeliers actively moved against the majority interests in this case. Large demonstrations in support of this and similar petitions led to civil unrest, and culminated in the Champ de Mars massacre on 17 July. The National Guard, led by the Marquis de Lafayette, fired on the protestors, resulting in the deaths of at least dozen of them. Subsequent action taken against the Cordeliers included the closing of the Cordeliers Convent to them and the issuing of arrest warrants for Danton and Desmoulins. Despite these measures, the society remained a highly influential force in Parisian politics.

The Cordeliers participated significantly in the planning and execution of the 10 August 1792 insurrection. Danton, at this time perhaps the most powerful figure within the Cordeliers Club, acted—in Hilaire Belloc's words—as "the organizer and chief of the insurrection" and was appointed Minister of Justice in the government that resulted, with Desmoulins and Fabre d'Églantine—both prominent members of the Cordeliers Club—as his secretaries.

Subsequent to this insurrection and to the September Massacres that followed closely on its heels, the Cordeliers Club became increasingly the province of ultra-revolutionary factions, particularly the Hébertists, who advocated extreme measures to intensify the Terror.

In December 1793, Desmoulins began publishing a journal entitled Le Vieux Cordelier or "The Old Cordelier", which attempted to reclaim the title of the society from those who had associated it with extremism. In the seven numbers of the journal, Desmoulins attacked the Hébertists and called for an end to the Terror, comparing revolutionary Paris to Rome under the tyrants. The Hébertists were arrested and, on 24 March 1794, executed, but the less extreme Desmoulins, Danton and the "Old Cordeliers" of the Dantonist faction quickly followed them to the guillotine. Their execution took place on April 5. The Cordeliers Club, deprived of its most important members, initially played no role in the further course of the revolution. After the Jacobin Club closed in November 1794, its most vehement representatives (so-called crêtois) joined the Cordeliers. In response, the Thermidorians arranged for its final closure on the 20th of Pluviose III (February 20, 1795).

== Bibliography ==
The papers emanating from the Cordeliers are enumerated in Jean Maurice Tourneux, Bibliographie de l'histoire de Paris pendant la Révolution (1894), i. (on the trial of the Hébertists) Nos. 4204–4210, ii. Nos. 9795–9834 and 11,813. See also A. Bougeart Les Cordeliers, documents pour servir a l'histoire de la Révolution (Caen, 1891); G. Lenotre, Paris révolutionnaire (Paris, 1895); G. Tridon, Les Hébertistes, plainte contre une calomnie de l'histoire (Paris, 1864). The last-named author was condemned to four months' prison; his work was reprinted in 1871. The inventory of the pictures found in 1790 in the Cordeliers Convent was published by J. Guiffrey in Nouvelles archives de l’art français, viii., 2nd series, iii. (1880).

== Factions and members ==
- Hébertists or Exaggerateds (radicalism)
  - Jacques-René Hébert (leader)
  - Antoine-François Momoro
  - Charles-Philippe Ronsin
  - Pierre Gaspard Chaumette
  - Jean-Baptiste-Joseph Gobel
  - Marie-Joseph Chénier
  - François-Nicolas Vincent
  - Jean-Baptiste Noël Bouchotte
- Dantonists or Indulgents (moderatism)
  - Georges Jacques Danton (leader)
  - Camille Desmoulins
  - Pierre Philippeaux
  - Bertrand Barère
  - Fabre d'Églantine
  - Pierre-François-Joseph Robert
  - Pierre Choderlos de Laclos
- Non-affiliated extremists
  - Jean-Paul Marat (leader)
  - Jean-Baptiste Carrier
  - François Chabot
  - Stanislas-Marie Maillard
  - Théroigne de Mericourt

== See also ==
- Society of the Friends of Truth
- Convent of the Cordeliers of Nantes
