= Violet Methley =

English children's writer (1882 – 1953)

Methley's biography of Camille Desmoulins

Violet M. Methley (1882 – 1953) was an English writer of children's adventure novels, short stories, and drama.

== Early life ==
Methley was born in Seal, Kent.

== Works ==
Notable themes in her works are:

- Biography. Methley was the author of Camille Desmoulins: A Biography (1915) and gave a 'Biography of Boots and Shoes' on Radio 4 in 1924.
- Drama. Methley wrote plays for young children to act out and a guide to drama (Amateur Actor's Companion, 1915), noting that 'We are very far removed now from the century-old days when Jane Austen's heroine considered it grossly indecent and immodest for young ladies to dream of acting a play with a love-scene.'
- Australia. It is speculated that Methley spent time living in Australia as many of her stories feature Australia or Australian people. For example, 'The Bunyip Patrol' (1926) features a patrol of schoolgirls who attempt to track down the creature of Aboriginal legend, the bunyip.
- Horror. Methley is noted as an early woman writer of science fiction and horror. Some of her stories ('Dread at Darracombe', 1930 and 'The Milk Carts', 1932) appear in Weird Tales under her own name.
- WWII. 'The Vackies' (1941) follows a family of evacuated children and picks up on the themes of evacuated children’s attachment to animals.

== Select works ==
- Fourteen Fourteens (1900)
- Camille Desmoulins: A Biography (1914)
- Girl Friday (1928)
- The Windmill Guides (1930)
- The Queer Island (1934)
- Seeing the Empire (1935)
- Cocky and Co. and Their Adventures (1937)
- Dragon Island: An Adventure Story for Girls (1938)
- Mystery Camp (1940)
- Lydia Gaff (1941)
- Great Galleon (1942)
- Derry Down-Under: A Story of Adventure in Australia (1943)
- Two in the Bush (1945)
- Georgie and the Dragon (1950)
- Armada Ahoy! (1953)
