= Le Vieux Cordelier =

French journal (published 1793–1794)

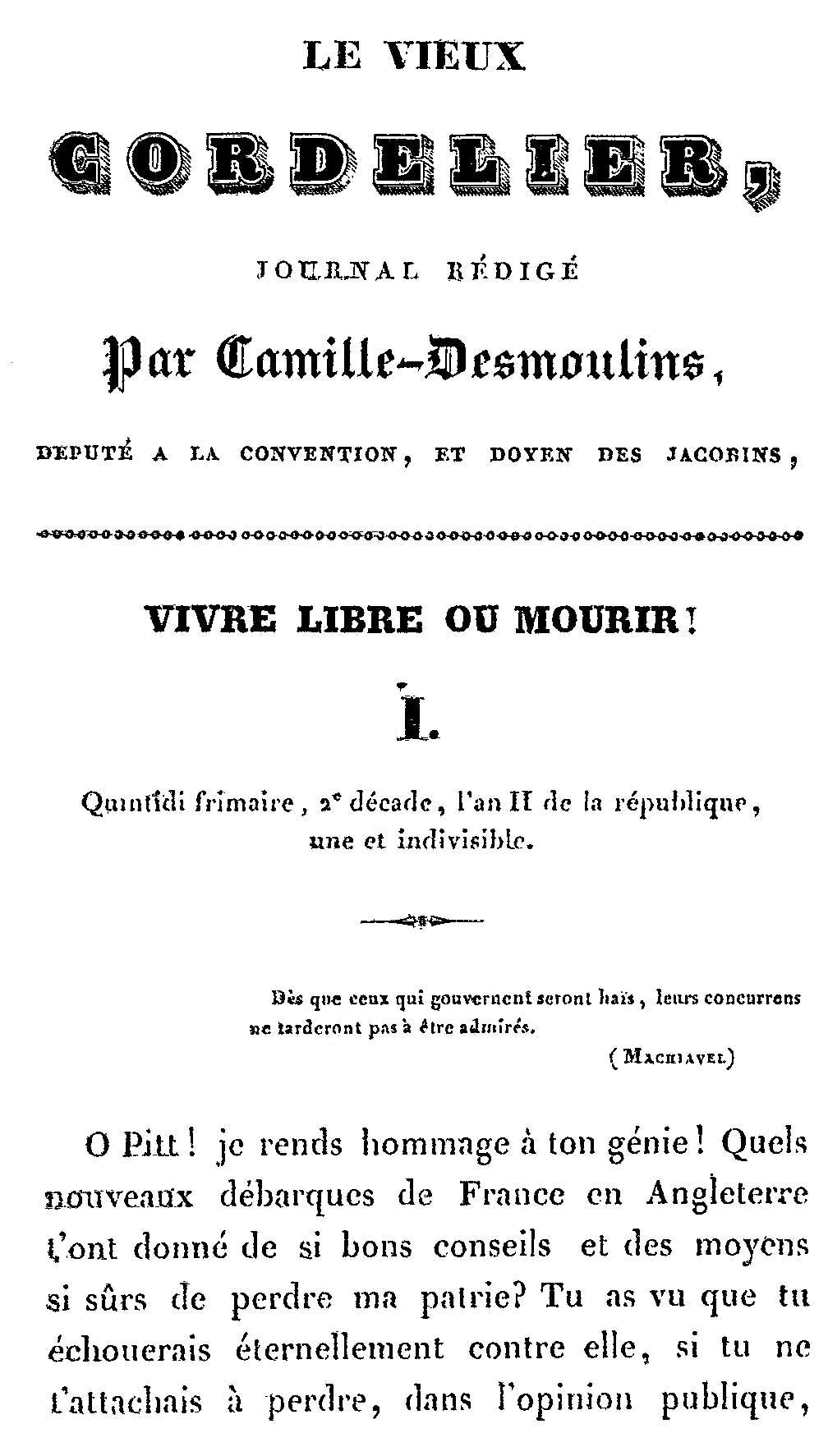
- First issue of Le Vieux Cordelier
- Type: Daily newspaper
- Format: Broadsheet
- Editor: Camille Desmoulins
- Founded: 5 December 1793
- Ceased publication: 3 February 1794
- Political alignment: Dantonism; Moderatism
- Language: French
- Headquarters: Paris, French Republic
- Circulation: 100,000 copies

Le Vieux Cordelier (French: [lə vjø kɔʁdəlje]) was a French journal published by Camille Desmoulins between 5 December 1793 and 3 February 1794 at the instigation of Georges Danton and warned not to exaggerate the Terror. Desmoulins argued that the French Revolution should return to its original ideas en vogue around 10 August 1792.

Its radical criticism of ultra-revolutionary fervor and repression in France during the Reign of Terror contributed significantly to the downfall and execution of the moderate Dantonists. It comprised seven numbers, of which six appeared; the seventh remained unpublished for some forty years. Le Vieux Cordelier was published twice a "décade" and sold very well.

== Camille Desmoulins ==
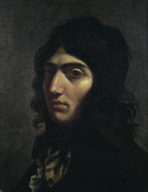
A portrait of Camille Desmoulins by Joseph Boze.

Desmoulins was born 2 March 1760, in Guise in Northern France. Desmoulins' role as a journalist led him to the production of Le Vieux Cordelier. He personally struggled in his attempts to become a lawyer; despite his acceptance in law school as well as into the Parlement of Paris, Desmoulins found himself inadequate to continue his career as a lawyer. His stammer and lack of connections to the Parisian legal community proved obstacles to success in this arena. Nevertheless, he still continued his struggle to contribute to a reconstructed government. As a Jacobin radical, Desmoulins was not the only one who contributed to these efforts. His close friends Maximilien Robespierre, Pétion de Villeneuve and Georges Danton played significant roles alongside him. This friendship lasted up until both Desmoulins and Danton (among fifteen other revolutionists), were put on trial in early April 1794 for their alleged royalist tendencies, their executions exemplified the height of the Reign of Terror.

== Title ==
The title of Le Vieux Cordelier ("The Old Cordelier") refers to the Cordeliers Club, an influential revolutionary society that, from its relatively moderate origins under Danton, had come to be associated with ultra-revolutionary factions – principally the followers of journalist Jacques René Hébert. Desmoulins sought to ally his journal's arguments with the less extreme politics of the earlier, "old" Cordeliers, while simultaneously repudiating the violent, anti-religious Hébertists. In this goal, Desmoulins was supported by Robespierre, who viewed the Vieux Cordelier's attacks on the Hébertists as an effective means of reducing the faction's power and popularity. However, later numbers of the journal introduced criticisms of the Revolutionary Tribunal, the Committee of Public Safety, and Robespierre himself.

== Issues ==
The first edition appears to be written to the glory of Maximilien Robespierre. He denounced the Hébertistes as agents of William Pitt the Younger. In the second issue the writer claims to be a democrat for the first time. He attacked Anarchasis Cloots and Jacques-René Hébert who contributed to divide the patriots.

=== Third Number ===
The third number of the Vieux Cordelier, appearing 25 Frimaire (15 December 1793), changed tone, purporting to quote without comment passages from the Annals of the Roman historian Tacitus concerning the oppressive reign of the emperor Tiberius. While more likely drawn from the Discourses on Tacitus published in 1737 by Thomas Gordon, these terse portraits – describing a civilization turned sick by fear and brutality – were effective in drawing a powerful parallel between Rome under Tiberius and France during the Terror. Desmoulins openly advocated for the release of prisoners, a clear indication of a forthcoming peace-oriented policy.

=== Fourth Number ===
The fourth issue of Le Vieux Cordelier, published 30 Frimaire (20 December 1793), was explosive. He attacked the de-Christianisers and compared Maximilien Robespierre with Julius Caesar as dictator. Desmoulins counseled Robespierre not to attempt to build the Republic on such a rare quality as virtue. He took up the cause of the 200,000 defenseless civilians that had been detained in prisons as suspects and called for clemency:

You want to remove all your enemies by means of the guillotine! Has there ever been such great folly? Could you make a single man perish on the scaffold, without making ten enemies for yourself from his family or his friends? ... I think quite differently from those who tell you that terror must remain the order of the day.

The fourth number argued against the Law of Suspects, saying: "...in the Declaration of Rights there is no house of suspicion... there are no suspected persons, only those convicted of crimes fixed by the law." It also appealed for a "Committee of Clemency" to counter the excesses of the Committee of Public Safety and Committee of General Security. So controversial were these views that Desmoulins was expelled from the Cordeliers Club and denounced at the Jacobin Club. Robespierre, hoping to present his friend "as an unthinking child who had fallen into bad company," recommended that the offending numbers of the journal be publicly burnt as an alternative to expelling Desmoulins from the Jacobins. Initially Robespierre supported Camille's new project, as long as he believed it would lead to the end of the Hébertists. Eventually, the more popular the newspaper got the farther he felt Desmoulins from their initial purpose nevertheless, leading him to requesting the right to proofread anything before it was published.

=== Fifth Number ===
In the fifth number, which appeared 16 Nivôse (5 January 1794) though dated 5 Nivôse (25 December 1793), Desmoulins addressed himself in a "justificatory discourse" to the Jacobins, maintaining his calls for an end to the Terror. He accuses Hébert of aiming to prepare the counter-revolution through his extremism, with the assistance, although not explicitly mentioned, of Jean de Batz. Shortly after this issue appeared, on 21 Nivôse (10 January), Desmoulins was expelled from the Jacobin Club.

=== Sixth Number ===
The sixth number, though dated 10 Nivôse (30 December 1793), was further delayed due to the political concerns of its publisher Desenne, and did not appear until 15 Pluviôse (3 February 1794). Though Desmoulins had rephrased his demands for a Committee of Clemency and called instead for a "Committee of Justice", and turned his attacks again against the politically acceptable target of Hébert, his criticism of the Terror continued. Desenne hesitated to release this issue, ultimately deciding to withhold the Seventh Number rather than proceeding further.

=== Seventh Number ===
The Seventh Number, penned mid-March, even before the arrest of his Hébertist enemies, never saw the light during Desmoulins' lifetime, largely due to apprehension about its political stance. He addressed the members of the Committee of general security, which had stifled the case of François Chabot. It also contained a plea for the freedom of the press. In the early hours of March 31, Desmoulins was arrested under a warrant from the Revolutionary Tribunal. Alongside Danton, he faced trial on charges of counter-revolutionary conspiracy and, on 5 April 1794, met his fate at the guillotine.

== Sources ==
- Claretie, Jules. Camille Desmoulins and His Wife: Passages from the History of the Dantonists. London: Smith, Elder, & Co., 1876.
- Hammersley, Rachel. French Revolutionaries and English Republicans: The Cordeliers Club 1790-1794. Rochester: Boydell & Brewer Inc., 2005.
- Giovanni Tarantino, "Republicanism, Sinophilia, and Historical Writing Thomas Gordon (c. 1691–1750) and his ‘History of England’." Brepols Publishers, 2012.
- Methley, Violet. Camille Desmoulins: A Biography. New York: E.P. Dutton & Co., 1915.
- Scurr, Ruth. Fatal Purity: Robespierre and the French Revolution. New York: Owl Books, 2006.
- Weber, Caroline. Terror and Its Discontents: Suspect Words in Revolutionary France. Minneapolis: University of Minnesota Press, 2003.
