= National Convention =

Constituent assembly of France from 1792 to 1795

National Convention Convention nationale
- Kingdom of France; French First Republic
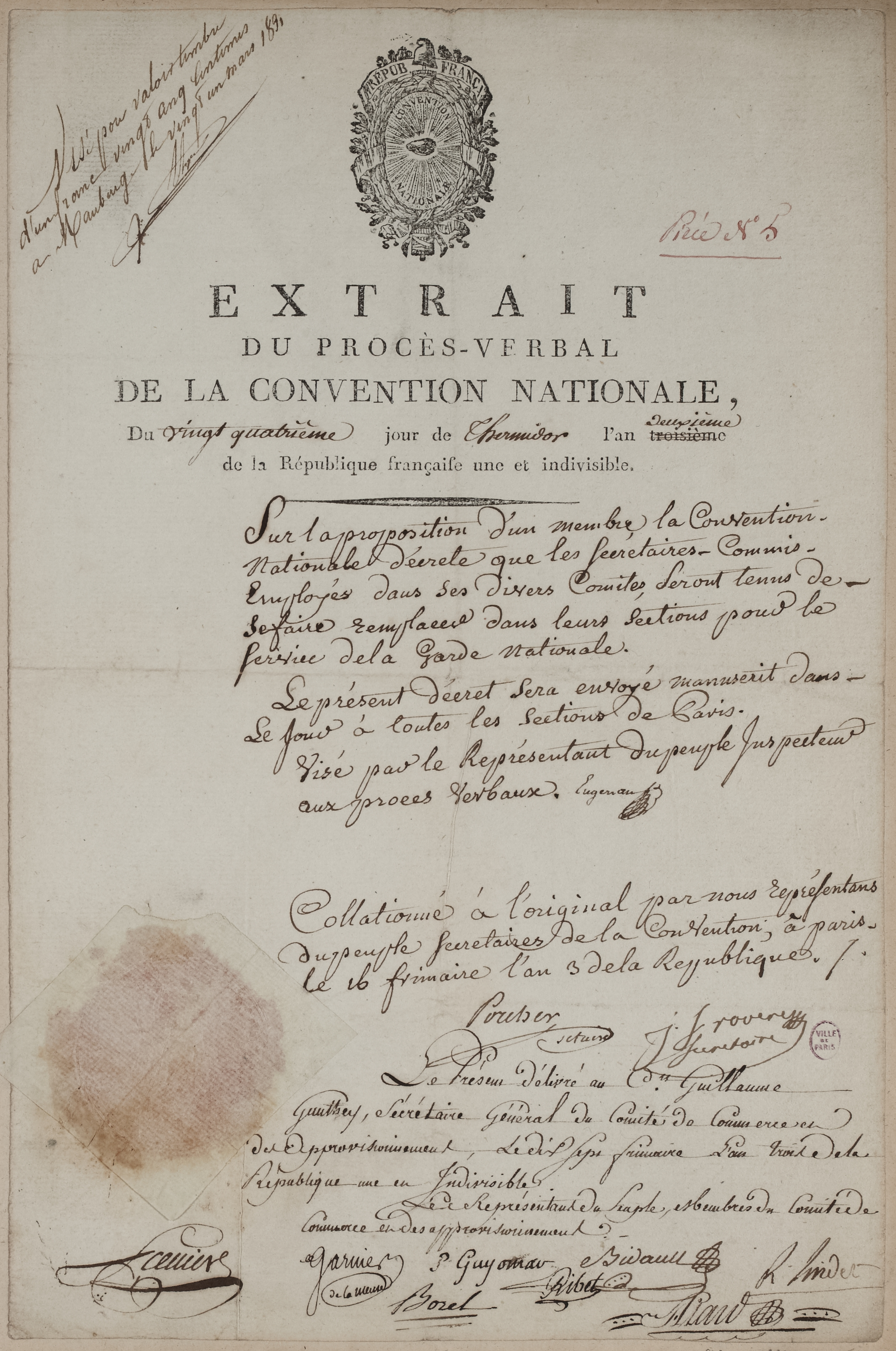
- Emblem of the National Convention

Type
- Type: Unicameral

History
- Established: 20 September 1792
- Disbanded: 3 November 1795
- Preceded by: Legislative Assembly
- Succeeded by: Council of Ancients; Council of Five Hundred

Structure
- Seats: Varied
- Political groups: Composition of the National Convention prior to the Insurrection of 31 May – 2 June 1793 and the subsequent purge of the National Convention: The Mountain (302) The Mountain (disputed members) (7) Girondins (178) Girondins (disputed members) (49) The Plain (153) The Plain (disputed members) (97)

Meeting place
- Salle du Manège (1792–1793); Salle des Machines (1793–1795)

The National Convention (French: Convention nationale, [kɔ̃vɑ̃sjɔ̃ nɑsjɔnal]) was the constituent assembly of the Kingdom of France for one day and of the French First Republic for its first three years during the French Revolution, following the two-year National Constituent Assembly and the one-year Legislative Assembly. The National Convention was created after the insurrection of 10 August 1792. It was the first French government organized as a republic, abandoning the monarchy altogether. The Convention sat as a single-chamber assembly from 20 September 1792 to 26 October 1795 (4 Brumaire IV under the Convention's adopted calendar).

The Convention came about when the Legislative Assembly decreed the provisional suspension of King Louis XVI and the convocation of a National Convention to draw up a new constitution with no monarchy. The other major innovation was to decree that deputies to that Convention should be elected by all Frenchmen 21 years old or older, domiciled for a year and living by the product of their labor. The National Convention was, therefore, the first French assembly elected by a suffrage without distinctions of class.

Although the Convention lasted until 1795, power was effectively delegated by the Convention and concentrated in the small Committee of Public Safety from April 1793. The eight months from the fall of 1793 to the spring of 1794, when Maximilien Robespierre and his allies dominated the Committee of Public Safety, represent the most radical and bloodiest phase of the French Revolution, known as the Reign of Terror. After the fall of Robespierre, the Convention lasted for another year until a new constitution was written, ushering in the French Directory.

== Elections ==
The indirect election took place from 2 to 10 September 1792 after the election of the electoral colleges by primary assemblies on 26 August. Despite the introduction of universal male suffrage, the turn-out was low, (Note: The Convention had therefore been elected by small minority of the population, but those who were the most determined. That explains the ambiguity of the word "popular" when it is applied to this period: "popular" the French Revolution was certainly not in the sense of participation by the people in public affairs. But if the word "popular" is taken to mean that revolutionary policy was formed under pressure from the sans-culotte movement and organized minorities, and received an egalitarian impetus from them, then yes, the Revolution had well and truly entered its "popular" age.) though there was an increase in comparison to the 1791 elections—in 1792 11.9% of a greatly increased electorate votes, compared to 10.2% of a much smaller electorate in the 1791. The low turn-out was partly due to a fear of victimization. In Paris, Maximilien Robespierre presided over the elections and, in concert with the radical press, managed to exclude any candidate of royalist sympathies. In the whole of France, only eleven primary assemblies wanted to retain the monarchy. The electoral assemblies all tacitly voted for a "republic", though only Paris used that word.

On 20 September the Convention held its first session in the "Salle des Cent-Suisses;" the next day it moved to the Salle du Manège, which had little room for the public and bad acoustics. From 10 May 1793 it met in the Salle des Machines, an immense hall in which the deputies were loosely scattered. The Salle des Machines had galleries for the public who often influenced the debates with interruptions or applause. (Note: During the early meetings of the Convention the deputies had sat indiscriminately, where they pleased. But it was noticed that, as the quarrel between Jacobins and Girondins developed, they grouped themselves to the right and left of the President's chair, whiles the extreme Jacobins found a place of vantage in the higher seats at the end of the hall, which came to be called The Mountain (French: La Montagne).)

The members of the Convention came from all classes of society, but the most numerous were lawyers. 75 members had sat in the National Constituent Assembly, 183 in the Legislative Assembly. The full number of deputies was 749, not counting 33 from the French colonies, of whom only some arrived in Paris in time. Thomas Paine and Anacharsis Cloots were appointed in the Convention by Girondins. Besides these, however, the newly formed départements annexed to France from 1782 to 1789 were allowed to send deputations.

According to its own ruling, the Convention elected its president every fortnight (two weeks), and the outgoing president was eligible for re-election after the lapse of a fortnight. Ordinarily, the sessions were held in the morning, but evening sessions also occurred frequently, often extending late into the night. Sometimes in exceptional circumstances, the Convention declared itself in permanent session and sat for several days without interruption. For both legislative and administrative purposes the Convention used committees, with powers more or less widely extended and regulated by successive laws. The most famous of these committees included the Committee of Public Safety and the Committee of General Security.

== Political breakdown ==
The National Convention was made up of three major factions: The Montagnards (the Mountain), the Marais (the Plain) and the Girondins, also called Brissotins. Historians are divided on the makeup of the Convention, but the current consensus is that the Mountain was the biggest faction with around 302–309 deputies. The Girondins were represented by 178–227 deputies, and the Plain was represented by 153–250 deputies. Of the three groups the Mountain was the most cohesive, and the Plain was the least cohesive. Over 94% of the Mountain voted similarly on core issues; comparatively the Girondins and the Plain were much more divided with only 70% of Girondins voting similarly on the same issues and only 58% of the Plain voting similarly on the same issues.

== Girondin Convention ==
=== Girondins and Montagnards ===
The Girondins were more conservative than the Montagnards, although they were still democrats. The Girondins drew their name from the Gironde, a region of France from which many of the deputies of this faction were elected (although many "Girondins" were actually Parisian by origin) and were also known as the Brissotins after their most prominent speaker, Jacques Pierre Brissot. The Montagnards drew their support from the Paris Commune and the popular societies such as the Jacobin Club and the Cordeliers; they got their name from the high bleachers on which they sat while the Convention was in session.

=== The Plain ===
The Plain was a third faction during the Convention. It derived its name from their place on the floor of the Convention. During the start of the Convention, they sided with the Girondins, however, as it progressed and the Montagnards began to push for the execution of Louis XVI, The Plain began to side with them.

=== Trial and execution of the king ===
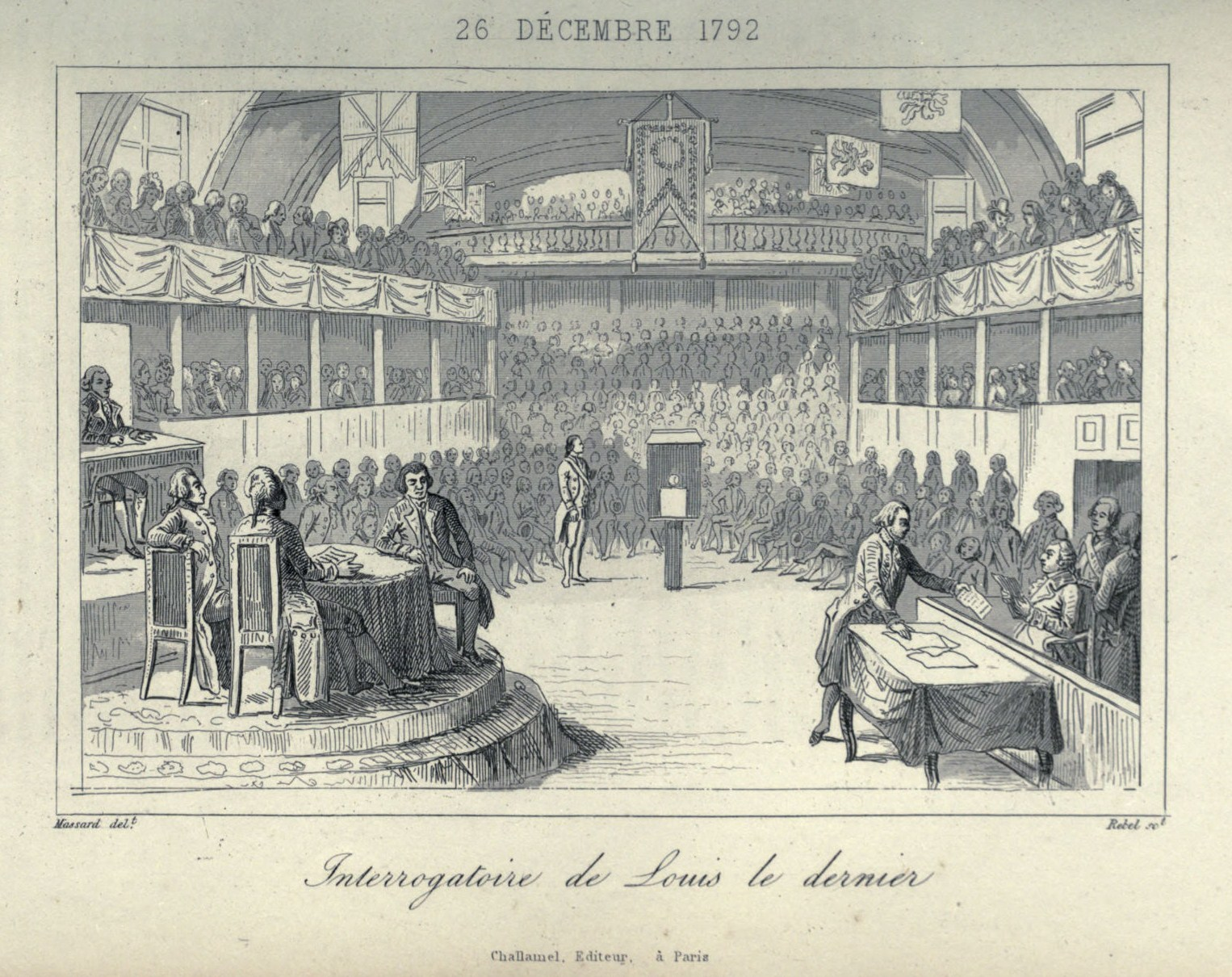
The trial of Louis XVI

The Convention's unanimous declaration of a French Republic on 21 September 1792 left open the fate of the former king. A commission was therefore established to examine the evidence against him while the Convention's Legislation Committee considered legal aspects of any future trial. Most Montagnards favoured judgment and execution, but the Girondins were divided concerning Louis's fate, with some arguing for royal inviolability, others supporting clemency and still others advocating lesser punishment or banishment. On 13 November Robespierre stated that a constitution which Louis had violated, despite declaring his inviolability, could not be used in his defence. Robespierre had been taken ill and had done little other than support Montagnard leader Louis Antoine de Saint-Just, who gave his first major speech, in his argument against the king's inviolability. On 20 November, opinion turned sharply against Louis following the discovery of a secret cache of 726 documents consisting of Louis's personal communications with bankers and ministers. At his trial, he claimed not to recognise documents that had been clearly signed by him.

=== Crisis and fall of Girondins ===
Military setbacks from the First Coalition, Charles François Dumouriez's defection to the enemy, and the War in the Vendée (which began in March 1793) were all used as arguments by Montagnards and sans-culottes to portray Girondins as soft. The Montagnards proposed measures, but the Girondins were reluctant to take such measures. The Girondins were forced to accept the Montagnards' creation of the Revolutionary Tribunal and a Committee of Public Safety. Social and economic difficulties exacerbated the tensions between the groups.

The final showdown, the insurrection of 31 May – 2 June 1793, was precipitated by Jean-Paul Marat's trial and the arrest of sectional activists. On 25 May, the Paris Commune marched to the Convention to demand the release of the activists.

== Montagnard Convention ==
=== Revolutionary government ===
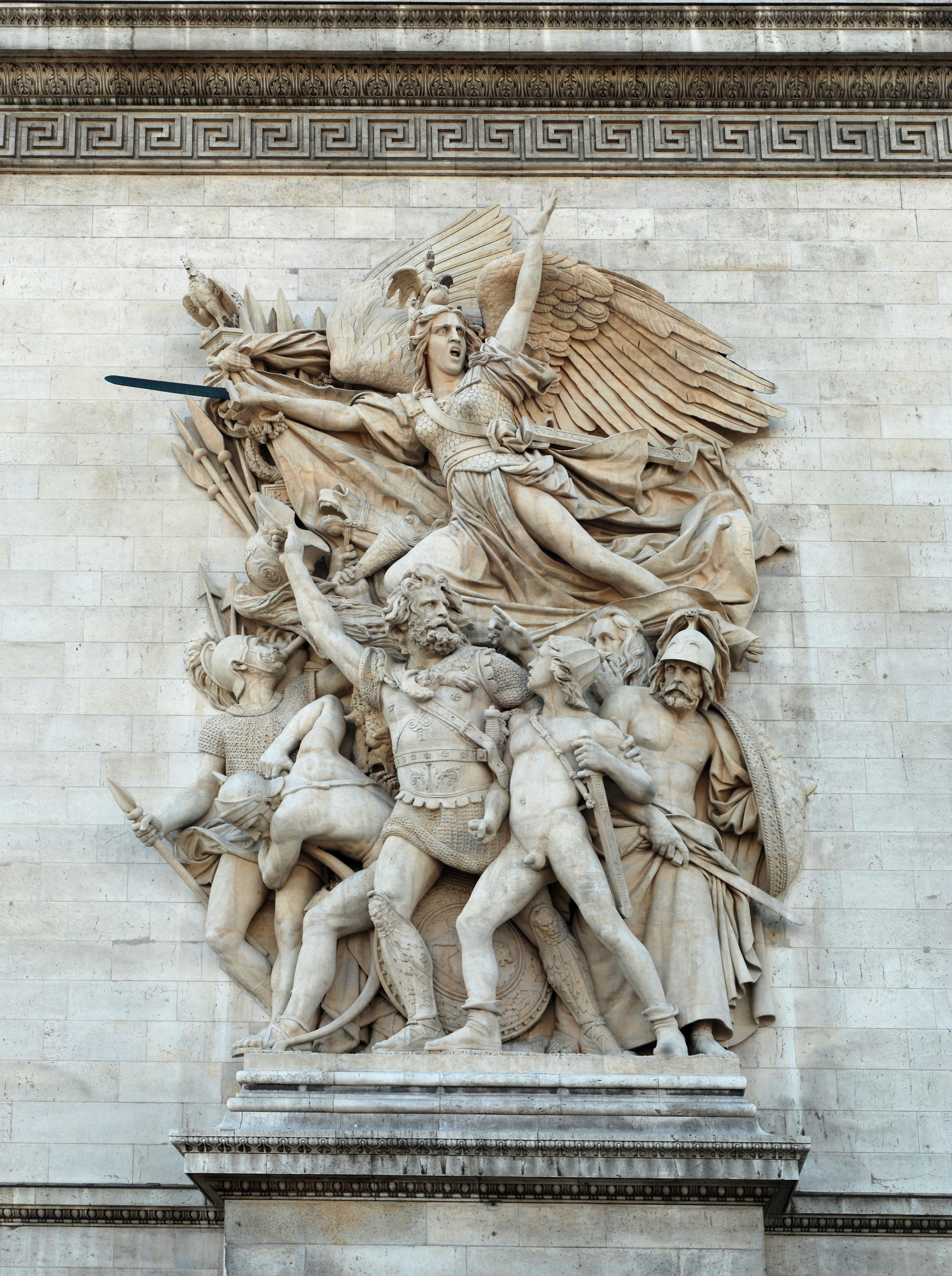
La Marseillaise by François Rude

On 5 September, Parisians tried to repeat the revolt of 2 June. Armed sections again encircled the Convention to demand the setting up of an internal revolutionary army, the arrest of suspects and a purge of the committees. It was probably the key day in the formation of the revolutionary government: the convention yielded, but kept control of events. It put Terror on the agenda on 5 September, on the 6th elected Collot d'Herbois and Billaud-Varenne to the Committee of Public Safety, on the 9th created the revolutionary army, on the 11th decreed the Maximum for grain and fodder (general controls for prices, and wages on the 29th), on the 14th reorganized the Revolutionary Tribunal, on the 17th voted in the law on suspects, and on the 20th gave the local revolutionary committees the task of drawing up lists of them.

=== Fall of factions ===
As late as September 1793, there were two distinct wings among the revolutionaries. Firstly, those who were later called Hébertists although Jacques Hébert himself was never the official leader of a party that advocated war to the death and adopted the program of the enragés, ostensibly because the sans-culottes approved it. The Hébertists preferred to side with the Montagnards so long as they could hope to control the Convention through them. They dominated the Cordeliers Club, filled Bouchotte's offices, and could generally carry the Commune with them. The other wing was the Dantonists, which formed in response to the increasing centralization of the Revolutionary Government and the dictatorship of the Committees. The Dantonists were led predominately by deputies of the Convention (rather than the sans-culottes), including Danton, Delacroix, and Desmoulins.

Ultimately, the Committee had undermined its own support by eliminating the Dantonists and Hébertists, both of which had backed the Committee. By compelling the Convention to allow the arrests of the Girondins and Dantonists, the Committee believed that it had destroyed its major opposition. However, the trials demonstrated the Committee's lack of respect for members of the Convention, several of whom had been executed. Many Convention members who had sided with the Committee by mid-1794 no longer supported it. The Committee had acted as mediator between the Convention and the sans-culottes from which they both had acquired their strength. By executing the Hébertists and alienating the sans-culottes, the Committee became unnecessary to the Assembly.

=== Terror ===
The Terror was meant to discourage support for the enemies of the Revolution by condemning outspoken critics of the Montagnards.

The goal was to strike down alleged enemies of the Revolution, in the provinces and elsewhere, of various classes. According to Marxian historian Albert Mathiez, "The severity of repressive measures in the provinces was in direct proportion to danger of revolt." Many outspoken members of the community were tried and executed for claims of treason. Camille Desmoulins and Georges Danton were two of the more notable men executed for their "threats" against the Revolution.

=== Slavery ===
The monarchy made a distinction between French soil on the mainland and soil under French control such as the colonies. That distinction allowed for slavery to be illegal in France but continue in the colonies. Colonists in Saint Domingue wanted to have representation, 21 members because of their population size and contribution to the economy. That was shot down by the National Convention as the majority of their population were slaves and thus had no rights as citizens and contributed nothing to representative population. The Société des amis des Noirs in France originally opposed slavery during the 1780s, but much of the opposition was ignored as a result of the French Revolution breaking out. The French showed a much greater willingness to act on the issue of slavery when the threat of a war with Spain seemed imminent.

In 1792 the National Convention agreed to delegate 3 commissaries for Saint Domingue. Two of the commissaires, Léger-Félicité Sonthonax and Étienne Polverel, implemented rights for free men of color that were equal to their white counterparts. On 5 May 1793 Sonthonax and Polverel attacked the plantation system and forced the owners to treat the slaves better and care more for their well-being. Sonthonax then attacked slavery itself by freeing any slave Huzards, Latin for hazards, who had been armed by their masters since they could not return to peaceful plantation life. Polverel issued a proclamation in Cap Francais on 21 June 1793, which freed all slaves who agreed to fight for the French Republic from both internal and external threats. The commissaires then ruled that the Republic would pay an indemnity to the owners of female slaves marrying free men and that all children of that union would be free. The National Convention eventually allowed for six representative members for the colony. When pressured by the Society of the Friends of the Blacks to end the slave trade in the colonies, the National Convention refused on the grounds of slavery being too core to the French economic wealth. The committee felt "six million French people relied on the colonies to survive" and continued to stand by the argument.

On 12 October 1790 the National Convention declared the only body of power who could control the status of people in the colonies were committees in the colonies themselves, which meant although free blacks met the requirement for active citizenship, the white colonists would not allow it. That was done in an attempt to please the white colonists and convince them not to join forces with the British. It also gave the colonies the power to control their own laws regarding slavery and allowed for the National Convention to wash their hands of the issue. Three deputies from Saint Domingue traveled to France to attempt to persuade the National Convention to abolish slavery. The National Convention abolished slavery after hearing speeches from the deputies on 4 February 1794. However, the Committee of Public Safety delayed sending the proclamation to the colonies for two months. That was because of the apparent opposition of Robespierre to the abolition of slavery. The issue was eventually resolved by the Committee circumventing Robespierre and ordering the abolition decree to be sent to Saint Domingue. However, Napoleon's attempt to return to slavery in 1801 removed France's state of being the first to abolish slavery and led to the loss of the most prosperous French colony.

== Legacy ==
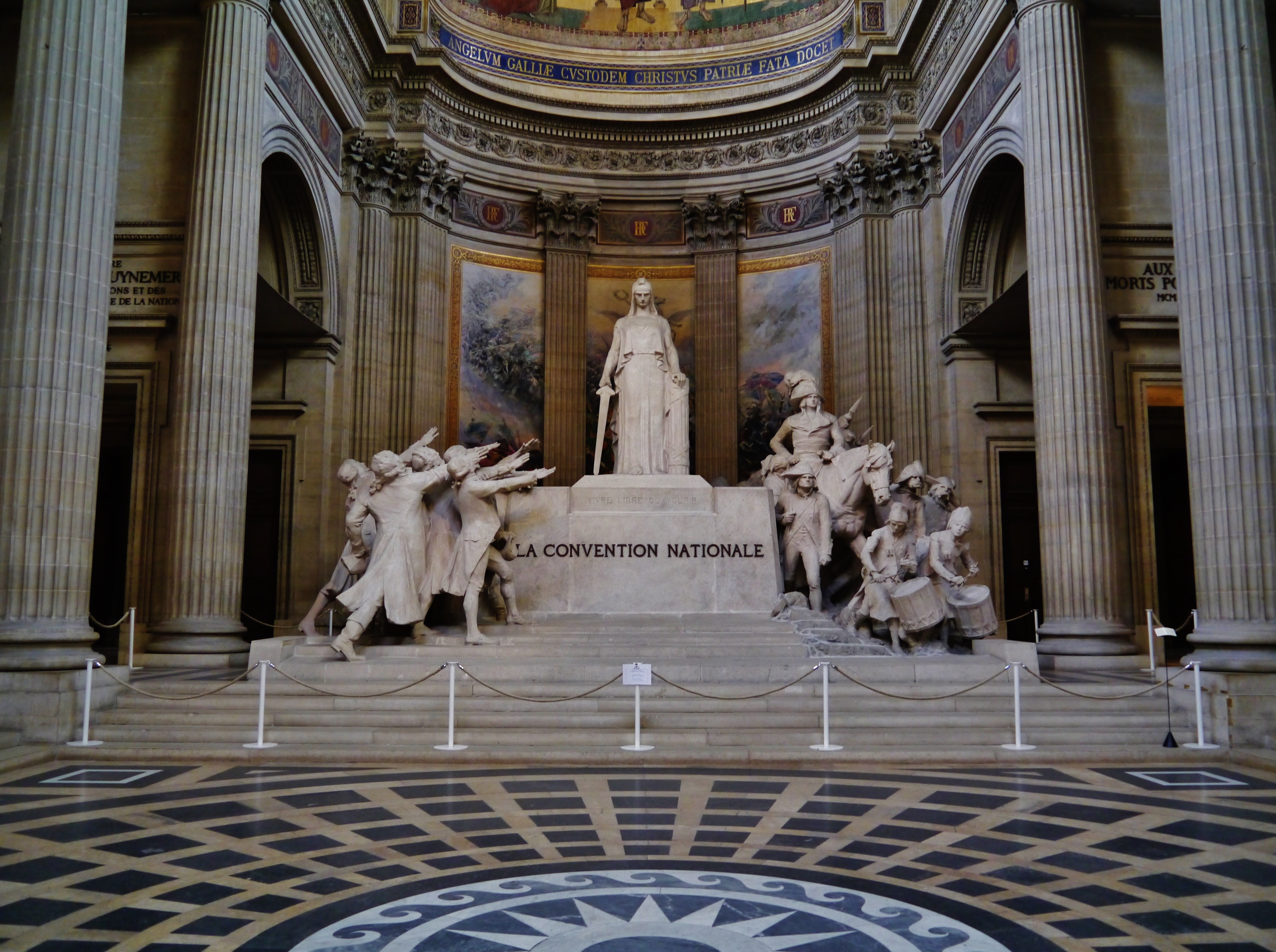
Autel de la Convention nationale or Autel républicain by François-Léon Sicard (1913), Panthéon, Paris

Anchel (1911) concludes, "The work of the Convention was immense in all branches of public affairs. To appreciate it without prejudice, one should recall that this assembly saved France from a civil war and invasion, that it founded the system of public education (Museum, École Polytechnique, École Normale Supérieure, École des langues orientales, Conservatoire), created institutions of capital importance, like that of the Grand Livre de la Dette publique, and definitely established the social and political gains of the Revolution." By a decree of 4 February 1794 (16 Pluviôse) it also ratified and expanded to the whole French colonial empire the 1793 abolition of slavery on Saint-Domingue by civil commissioners Sonthonax and Polverel, though this did not affect Martinique or Guadeloupe and was abolished by the law of 20 May 1802.

In the field of education, a law was introduced on May the 30th 1793 that established a minimum 1,500 livre salary for teachers and mandated (as noted by one study) “that all towns with a population between 400 and 1,500 should have at least one primary school.” A number of social welfare policies and programs were also introduced under the National Convention. Under a public assistance law of 19 March 1793, various principles were established such as state aid to be distributed according to population in each department, while work was to be provided to the able-bodied and home relief "wherever possible for other varieties of the needy," while almsgiving was prohibited. A later public assistance law dated 28 June 1793 provided for state aid to be given through district ‘agencies’ to the aged, children and, for the first time in the history of France, unmarried mothers. In addition, abandoned children were to be received in hospitals until they turned 12, when they were to be apprenticed. A law of 15 October 1793, however, provided for the prohibition of begging and almsgiving and that "departmental maisons de repression are to be established, to set beggars to work." A law on pensions for soldier’s dependents was introduced on 9 February 1794, along with a "Generous and humane" law on pensions for war widows on 4 June 1794. In addition, a law of 11 May 1794 established the Grand Livre de Bienfaisance Nationale, "a register of state pensions benefiting the needy in rural areas."

A decree of June 1793, as noted by one study, "proposed to provide the services of physicians, nurses, midwives, and apothecaries to the sick poor." A variety of local and concrete welfare projects were pursued by the Jacobins, including a program that provided for free healthcare for armaments workers, along with pay for sick leave and disability and death benefits. Other Jacobin welfare projects included the founding of primary schools in some districts, an "egalitarian food policy," and the division and distribution of the land of the emigres. According to one study however, the actual impact of such policies and laws were much more limited, arguing that "Decree after decree proclaimed the eradication of mendacity and the end of chronic deprivation, and ever larger appropriations were ear-marked with seemingly reckless abandon for poor relief…all to no lasting effect."

== See also ==
- Fall of the French monarchy
- Girondist
- The Mountain
- Georges Danton
- Maximilien Robespierre
- Marat
- Ministers of the French National Convention

== Sources ==
- This article incorporates text from a publication now in the public domain: Anchel, Robert (1911). "Convention, The National". In Chisholm, Hugh (ed.). Encyclopædia Britannica. Vol. 7 (11th ed.). Cambridge University Press. p. 46.
- Andress, David (2006). The Terror: the merciless war for freedom in revolutionary France. Farrar: Straus and Giroux. ISBN 0-374-27341-3.
- Andress, David, and Manuel Covo. "Race, Slavery, and Colonies in the French Revolution." In The Oxford Handbook of the French Revolution, The Oxford Handbook of the French Revolution, Chapter 017. Oxford University Press, 2015.
- Aulard, François-Alphonse (1910). The French Revolution, a Political History, 1789–1804, in 4 vols. New York: Charles Scribner's Sons.
- Bouloiseau, Marc (1983). The Jacobin Republic: 1792–1794. Cambridge: Cambridge University Press. ISBN 0-521-28918-1.
- Dupuy, Roger (2005). La République jacobine. Terreur, guerre et gouvernement révolutionnaire (1792–1794). Paris: Le Seuil, coll. Points. ISBN 2-02-039818-4.
- Furet, François (1996). The French Revolution: 1770–1814. Oxford: Blackwell Publishers Ltd. ISBN 0-631-20299-4.
- Greer, Donald (1935). Incidence of the Terror During the French Revolution: A Statistical Interpretation. Peter Smith Pub Inc. ISBN 978-0-8446-1211-9.
- Hampson, Norman (1988). A Social History of the French Revolution. Routledge: University of Toronto Press. ISBN 0-7100-6525-6.
- Jordan, David (1979). The King's Trial: Luis XVI vs. the French Revolution. Berkeley: University of California Press. ISBN 0-520-04399-5.
- Kennedy, Michael L. (1988). The Jacobin clubs in the French Revolution: the Middle Years. Princeton University Press. pp. 308–10. ISBN 978-0-691-05526-8.
- Lefebvre, Georges (1962). The French Revolution: from its Origins to 1793. Vol. I. New York: Columbia University Press. ISBN 0-231-08599-0.
- Lefebvre, Georges (1963). The French Revolution: from 1793 to 1799. Vol. II. New York: Columbia University Press. ISBN 0-231-02519-X.
- Lefebvre, Georges (1964). The Thermidorians & the Directory. New York: Random House.
- Linton, Marisa, Choosing Terror: Virtue, Friendship and Authenticity in the French Revolution (Oxford University Press, 2013).
- Mathiez, Albert (1929). The French Revolution. New York: Alfred a Knopf.
- Robespierre, Maximilien de (1958). Textes choisis. Vol. III: Novembre 1793 – Juillet 1794. Introduction et notes explicatives par Jean Poperen. Éditions sociales.
- Rude, George (1988). The French Revolution. New York: Grove Weidenfeld. ISBN 1-55584-150-3.
- Soboul, Albert (1974). The French Revolution: 1787–1799. New York: Random House. ISBN 0-394-47392-2.
- Soboul, Albert (2005). Dictionnaire historique de la Révolution française. Quadrige / PUF. ISBN 978-2130536055.
- Stein, Robert. "The Revolution of 1789 and the Abolition of Slavery." Canadian Journal of History/Annales Canadiennes D'Histoire 17, no. 3 (1982): 447–468.
- Thompson, J. M. (1959). The French Revolution. Oxford: Basil Blackwell.
- Woronoff, Denis (1984). The Thermidorean regime and the directory: 1794–1799. Cambridge: Cambridge University Press. ISBN 0-521-28917-3.
