= Le Père Duchesne =

Radical newspaper during the French Revolution

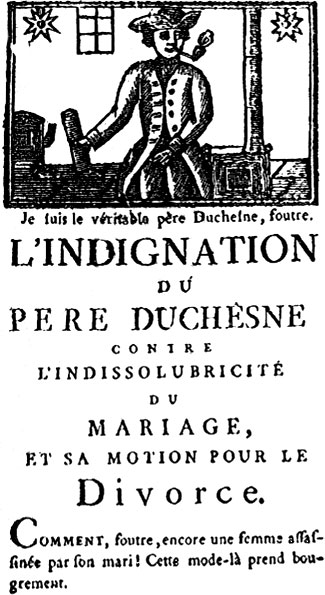
- Cover of issue no. 25 of Hébert's Le Père Duchesne
- Type: Daily newspaper
- Format: Broadsheet
- Editor: Jacques Hébert
- Founded: 1790
- Ceased publication: 24 March 1794
- Political alignment: Radicalism; Far-left
- Language: French
- Headquarters: Paris, French Republic
- Circulation: Unknown

Le Père Duchesne (French pronunciation: [lə pɛʁ dyʃɛːn]; "Old Man Duchesne" or "Father Duchesne") was an extreme radical newspaper during the French Revolution, edited by Jacques Hébert, who published 385 issues from September 1790 until eleven days before his death by guillotine, which took place on 24 March 1794.

== History ==
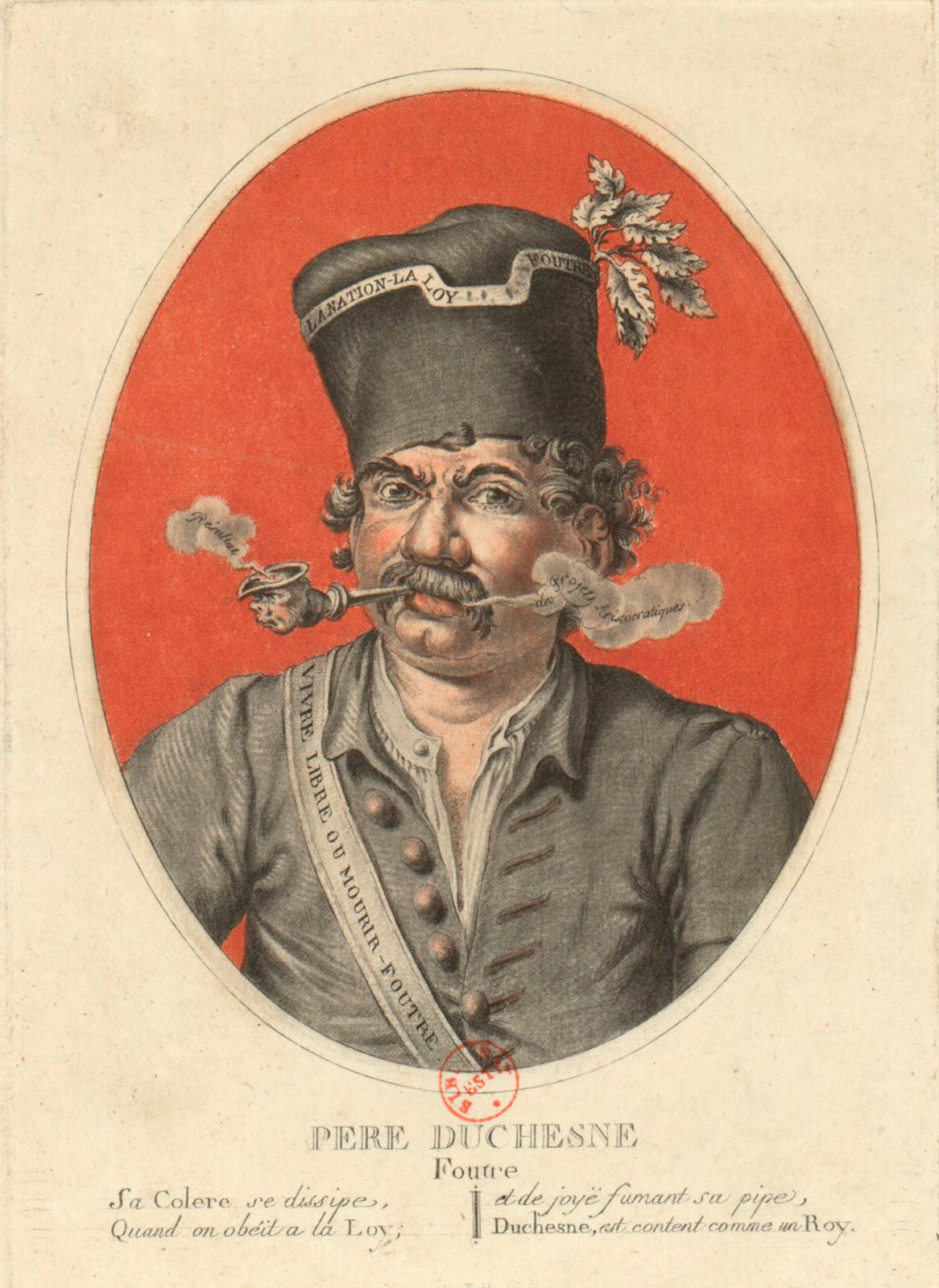
Père Duchesne

To be denounced as an enemy of the Republic by Le père Duchesne often led to the guillotine. The journal frequently used euphemistic language to call for the trial and execution of perceived enemies, such as calling for the "carriage with thirty-six doors" to take a "toad of the Marais" to "sneeze in the bag", "ask the time from the fanlight", or "try on Capet's necktie".

The anti-feminist views of the publication have been noted by numerous scholarly works. Women's political agency was maligned as a threat to society. Perverse imagery about women's bodies caricatured the threat posed by women's political power, for example, by incendiary accusations that blood flowed from the "miraculous teats" instead of breast milk.

Born in the fairs of the 18th century, Père Duchesne was a character representing the man of the people, always moved to denounce abuses and injustices. This imaginary character is found in a text entitled le plat de Carnaval ("the Carnival dish"), as well as an anonymous minor work in February 1789 called "Journey of Père Duchesne to Versailles" or "Père Duchesne's Anger at the Prospect of Abuses" in the same year.

In 1789, several pamphlets had been published under this name. In 1790, an employee of the post office by the name of Antoine Lemaire and Abbé Jean-Charles Jumel had been attacked in newspapers resorting to the fictional pseudonym Père Duchesne, but the Père Duchesne of Hébert, sold by the street-criers yelling "Père Duchesne is damn angry today!", was distinguished by the violence which characterized his style.

From 1790 to 1791, Père Duchesne represented the Jacobin Club, and eulogized King Louis XVI and the Marquis de La Fayette for their attempts to balance the power of aristocrats and the people of France. After the king's attempted flight to Varennes, the writers changed their views of Louis and blamed Marie Antoinette and Jean-Sifrein Maury, the great defender of papal authority against the Civil Constitution of the Clergy. In 1792, the government printed certain issues of Père Duchesne at the expense of the Republic, in order to distribute them to the army to rouse soldiers from a torpor considered dangerous to public safety.

The tone towards Louis changed drastically after his failed attempts to make changes to benefit the common people of France. La Fayette was also attacked after the Champ de Mars massacre. Marie Antoinette was criticized because she was partially seen as a reason for Louis's downfall. Her nationality was blamed because she was seen as an outsider who didn't deserve the king. The issues of children also brought trouble because it was believed that she was the reason for the infertility, and this put a strain on Louis.

The paper continued to run until Hébert's death in 1794.

== Focuses ==
It said that the country was ruled by the rich, but "nineteen-twentieths are neither rich nor merchants," but "this mass was always pure." The paper criticized the government's lack of action in stopping counterrevolution and the "dictatorial actions" used to rule the country. It would often focus on specific people and events and completely degrade every single part of it. Hébert was a radical, never slow to express his opinion, and used profane language in the majority of his published pieces. The paper was used to fight off and call out other parties that contradicted the author's views, such as the Girondists.

The editor had followers who called themselves Hébertists. Hébertists shared the idea of the dechristianization of France, which was a recurring topic in the paper.

In some cases, the paper would criticize the people whom it was trying to defend, the sans-culottes. It spoke of their "gullibility" when it came to the words of the government. It stated that they were a "sheep-like species" who "cannot see farther than their noses." It said that the people were making it more difficult for themselves by believing what the government was telling them.

== Camille Desmoulins ==
One of the main enemies of the paper was journalist Camille Desmoulins. Desmoulins was against the movement to dechristianize France, which Hébert and his followers supported. Père Duchesne and Desmoulins would often bicker back and forth within their respective papers. Desmoulins was executed a few weeks after Hébert.

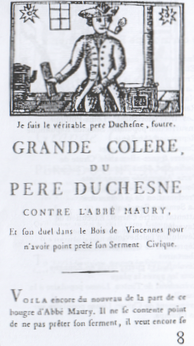
Issue attacking non-juror priests

== End and revival of Père Duchesne ==
As soon as Hébert was guillotined, these counterfeit Père Duchesnes had a field day, producing parodies such as The great anger of Père Duchesne seeing his head fall from the national window. Others, such as Saint-Venant, would try, with Moustache without fear, to write new parodies in the spirit of the time and in the same lewd gutter style that characterized Hébert. Lebon published one of them in 1797, and Damane published 32 issues under the name Père Duchesne in Lyon. The title was reprised numerous times in the 19th century.

The title was used hundreds of times again afterwards, mainly during revolutionary periods, for publications with no direct connection to the original: for example, during the July Revolution of 1830, the Revolution of 1848, and during the Paris Commune (1871).
