= Pierre Philippeaux =

French lawyer of the Revolutionary period

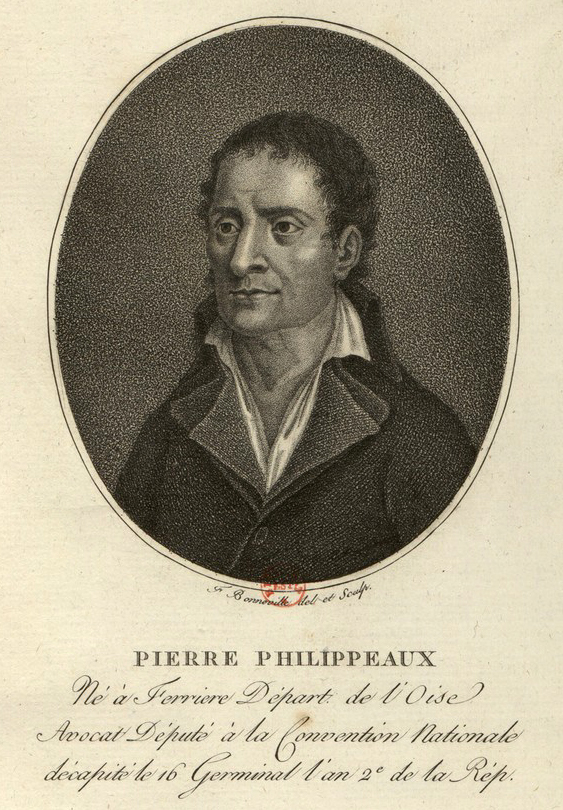
Pierre Philippeaux par Bonneville

Pierre Philippeaux (French pronunciation: [pjɛʁ filipo]; 9 November 1754 – 5 April 1794, Paris), was a French lawyer who was a deputy to the National Convention for Sarthe.

== Life ==
A lawyer then judge at the district tribunal for Le Mans, he created the newspaper Le défenseur de la Liberté at the start of the French Revolution. He voted for the king's death and was sent on a mission to the Vendée where he was noted for his negligence. On his return to Paris he denounced generals Ronsin and Rossignol in a virulent pamphlet. He attracted the hostility of Collot d'Herbois and Carrier and found himself accused of treason and counter-revolutionary activities by Saint-Just. Associated with the Dantonists, he fell with them and was guillotined on 5 April 1794.

== Sources ==
- Paul Mautouchet, Le conventionnel Philippeaux, Paris, Société nouvelle de librairie et d'édition (Librairie Georges Bellais), coll. « Bibliothèque d'histoire moderne et contemporaine », 1900, XLIV-408 p.
