= Camille Desmoulins =

18th-century French journalist, politician, and revolutionary

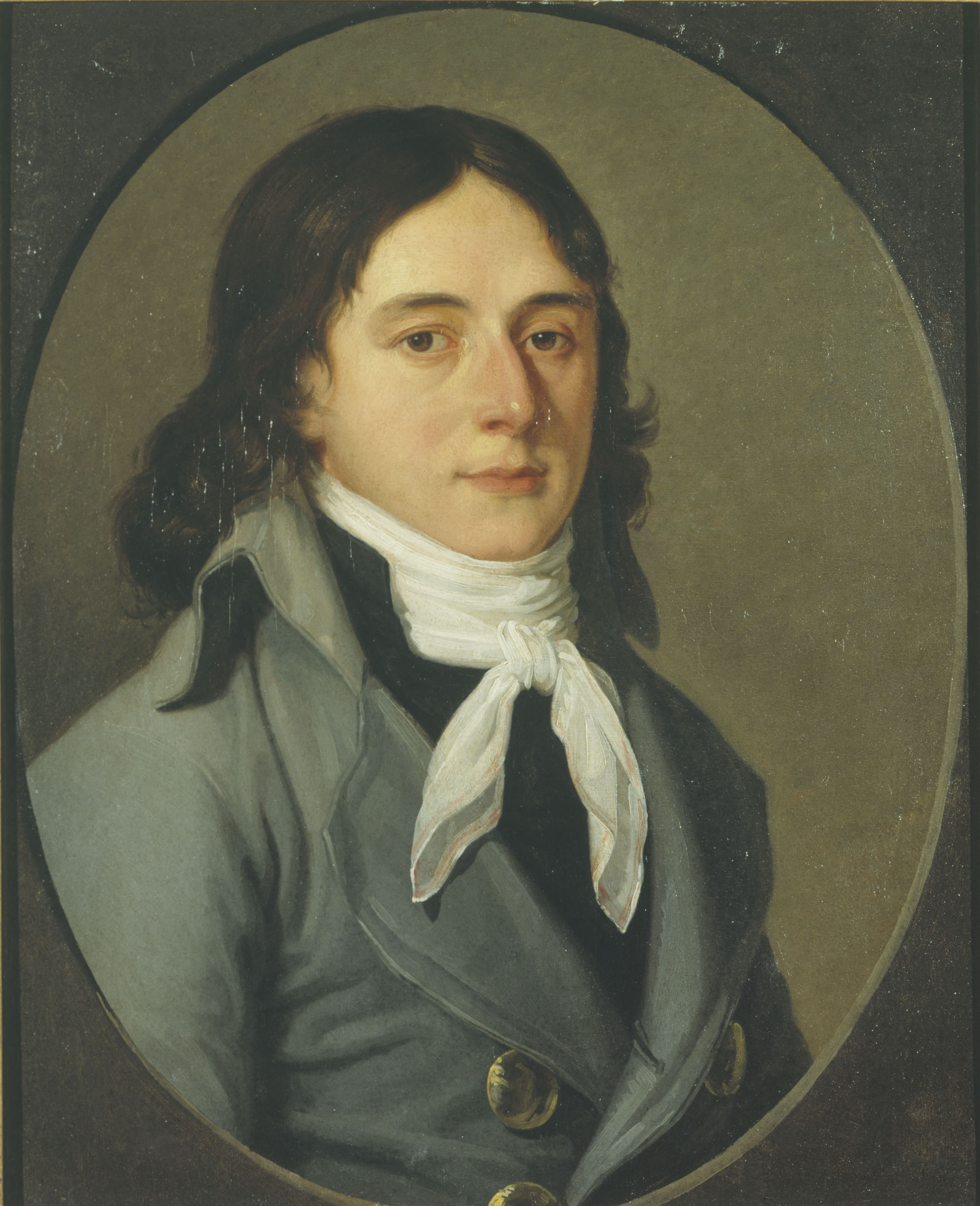
- Desmoulins c. 1790 Anonymous Carnavalet Museum, Paris

Deputy of the National Convention
- In office 20 September 1792 – 5 April 1794
- Constituency: Paris

Personal details
- Born: 2 March 1760 Guise, Picardy, France
- Died: 5 April 1794 (aged 34) Place de la Révolution, Paris, France
- Cause of death: Execution by guillotine
- Party: The Mountain
- Other political affiliations: Jacobin Club
- Spouse: Lucile Duplessis (m. 1790)
- Occupation: Journalist
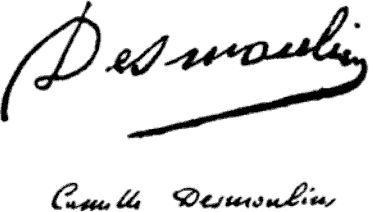
- Signature

Lucie-Simplice-Camille-Benoît Desmoulins (French: [lysi sɛ̃plis kamij bənwa demulɛ̃]; 2 March 1760 – 5 April 1794) was a French journalist, politician and prominent figure of the French Revolution. He is best known for playing an instrumental role in the events that led to the Storming of the Bastille. Desmoulins was also noted for his radical criticism of the Reign of Terror as the editor of the journal Le Vieux Cordelier. He was a schoolmate and close friend of Maximilien Robespierre and a close friend and political ally of Georges Danton, who were leading figures in the French Revolution.

A lawyer by training, Desmoulins was enthralled by the Revolution from its outbreak. On 12 July 1789, shortly after Louis XVI dismissed his popular finance minister Jacques Necker, Desmoulins delivered an impassioned call to arms to a crowd before the Palais-Royal. His agitation sparked widespread unrest in Paris, which culminated in the Storming of the Bastille two days later. Through his newfound fame, Desmoulins quickly established himself as a prominent radical pamphleteer. He advocated explicitly in favour of republicanism and revolutionary violence, and mounted relentless attacks on not only the Ancien Régime, but also once-sympathetic revolutionary figures such as Jacques Pierre Brissot. His campaigns ultimately contributed to the fall of the Girondist faction and the beginning of the Reign of Terror.

During the Terror, Desmoulins and Danton distanced themselves from Robespierre's radical Montagnards. Through his new journal Le Vieux Cordelier, he criticized the excesses of the Revolutionary Government and made pleas for clemency, which enraged Robespierre and eventually led to his downfall. In April 1794, Desmoulins was sentenced to death by the Revolutionary Tribunal and guillotined alongside Danton and other accused Dantonists.

== Early life ==
Desmoulins was born at Guise, in the province of Picardy, northern France. His father, Jean Benoît Nicolas Desmoulins, was a lieutenant-general of the bailliage of Guise. His mother was Marie-Madeleine Godart, from Wiège-Faty. Through the efforts of a friend, his father obtained a scholarship for the fourteen-year-old Camille to enter the Collège Louis-le-Grand in Paris. Desmoulins proved an exceptional student even among such notable contemporaries as Maximilien Robespierre and Louis-Marie Stanislas Fréron. He excelled in the study of Classical Literature and Politics, and gained a particular affinity for Cicero, Tacitus and Livy.

Desmoulins initially pursued a career in law, and succeeded in gaining acceptance as an advocate in the Parlement of Paris in 1785; however, his stammer and lack of connections to the Parisian legal community proved obstacles to success in this arena. Thus stymied, he turned towards writing as an alternative outlet for his talents; his interest in public affairs led him to a career as a political journalist.

In March 1789, Desmoulins senior was nominated as deputy to the Estates-General from the bailliage of Guise; however, due to illness, he failed to take his seat. Camille Desmoulins, himself limited to the role of spectator at the procession of the Estates-General on 5 May 1789, wrote a response to the event: Ode aux États Généraux. The Comte de Mirabeau, a powerful political figure within the Estates-General who positioned himself as a bridge between the aristocracy and the emerging reformist movement, briefly enlisted Desmoulins to write for his newspaper at this time, strengthening Desmoulins' reputation as a journalist.

== Outbreak of the Revolution ==
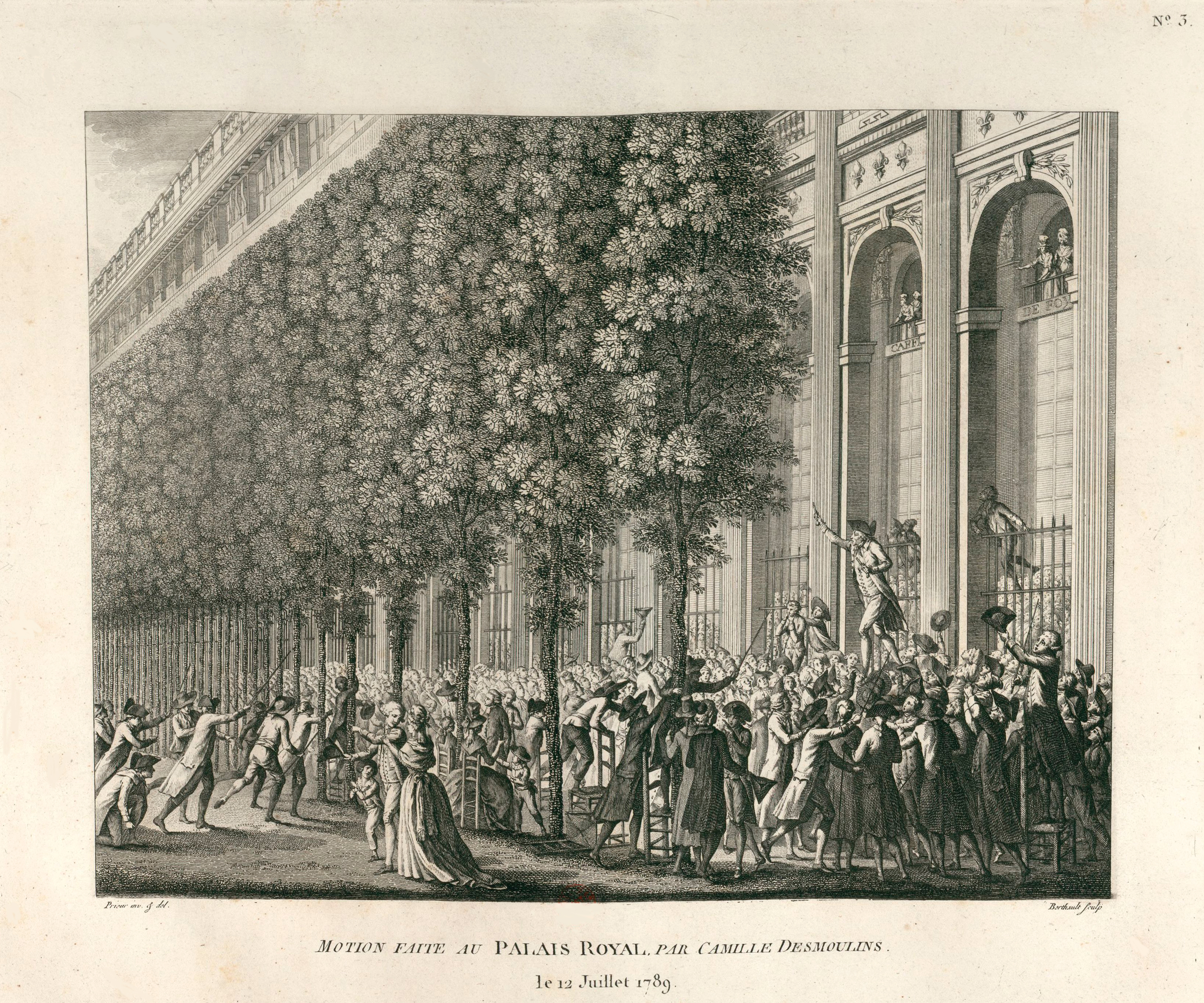
Desmoulins making a call to arms to the crowd near the Palais Royal, on 12 July 1789, by Pierre-Gabriel Berthault (1802)

Owing to his difficulties in establishing a career as a lawyer, Desmoulins' position in Paris was a precarious one and he often lived in poverty. However, he was greatly inspired and enthused by the current of political reform that surrounded the summoning of the Estates-General.

In letters to his father at the time, he rhapsodized over the procession of deputies entering the Palace of Versailles, and criticized the events surrounding the closing of the Salle des Menus Plaisirs to the deputies who had declared themselves the National Assembly—events which led to the famous swearing of the Tennis Court Oath.

The sudden dismissal of popular finance minister Jacques Necker by King Louis XVI on 11 July 1789 provided the spark that lit the fuse of Desmoulins' fame. On Sunday 12 July, spurred by the news of this politically unsettling dismissal, Desmoulins leapt onto a table outside the Café de Foy (one of many cafés in the garden of the Palais Royal frequented in large part by political dissidents) and delivered an impassioned call to arms. Shedding his customary stammer in the excitement, he urged the crowd to "take up arms and adopt cockades by which we may know each other", calling Necker's dismissal the tocsin of the St. Bartholomew of the patriots. The stationing of a large number of troops in Paris, many foreign, had led Desmoulins and other revolutionaries to believe that a massacre of dissidents in the city was indeed imminent. This was an idea that his audience also found plausible and threatening, and they were quick to join Desmoulins and take up arms in riots that rapidly spread throughout Paris.

The "cockades" worn by the crowd were initially green, a color associated with hope, and made at first from the leaves of the trees that lined the Palais Royal. However, the color green was also associated with the Comte d'Artois, the reactionary and conservative brother of the King, and the cockades, therefore, were quickly replaced by others in the traditional colors of Paris: red and blue. On 14 July, the people of Paris attacked the Hôtel des Invalides to seize arms, with Desmoulins among them arming himself with a musket with bayonet and two pistols, and embarked upon the Storming of the Bastille.

== Journalism ==
In June 1789, Desmoulins had written a radical pamphlet entitled La France Libre ("Free France"), which Parisian publishers at the time had refused to print. The rioting surrounding the storming of the Bastille, however, and especially Desmoulins' personal and publicized involvement in it, altered the situation considerably. On 18 July, Desmoulins's work was finally issued. The politics of the pamphlet ran considerably in advance of public opinion; in it, Desmoulins called explicitly for a republic, stating, "... popular and democratic government is the only constitution which suits France, and all those who are worthy of the name of men." La France Libre also examined and criticized in detail the role and rights of kings, of the nobility, and of the Roman Catholic clergy.

Desmoulins' renown as a radical pamphleteer was furthered by the publication, in September 1789, of his Discours de la lanterne aux Parisiens. Written from the perspective of the Place de Grève lamppost, it was aggressive in its celebration of political violence, and attributed exalted qualities of loyalty and patriotism to the citizens who made up the Parisian mob. This hard-edged fervor found an appreciative audience in Paris, and Desmoulins, as a result of the pamphlet, became known as the "Procureur-général de la lanterne" ("the Lanterne Prosecutor" or "Lanterne Attorney").

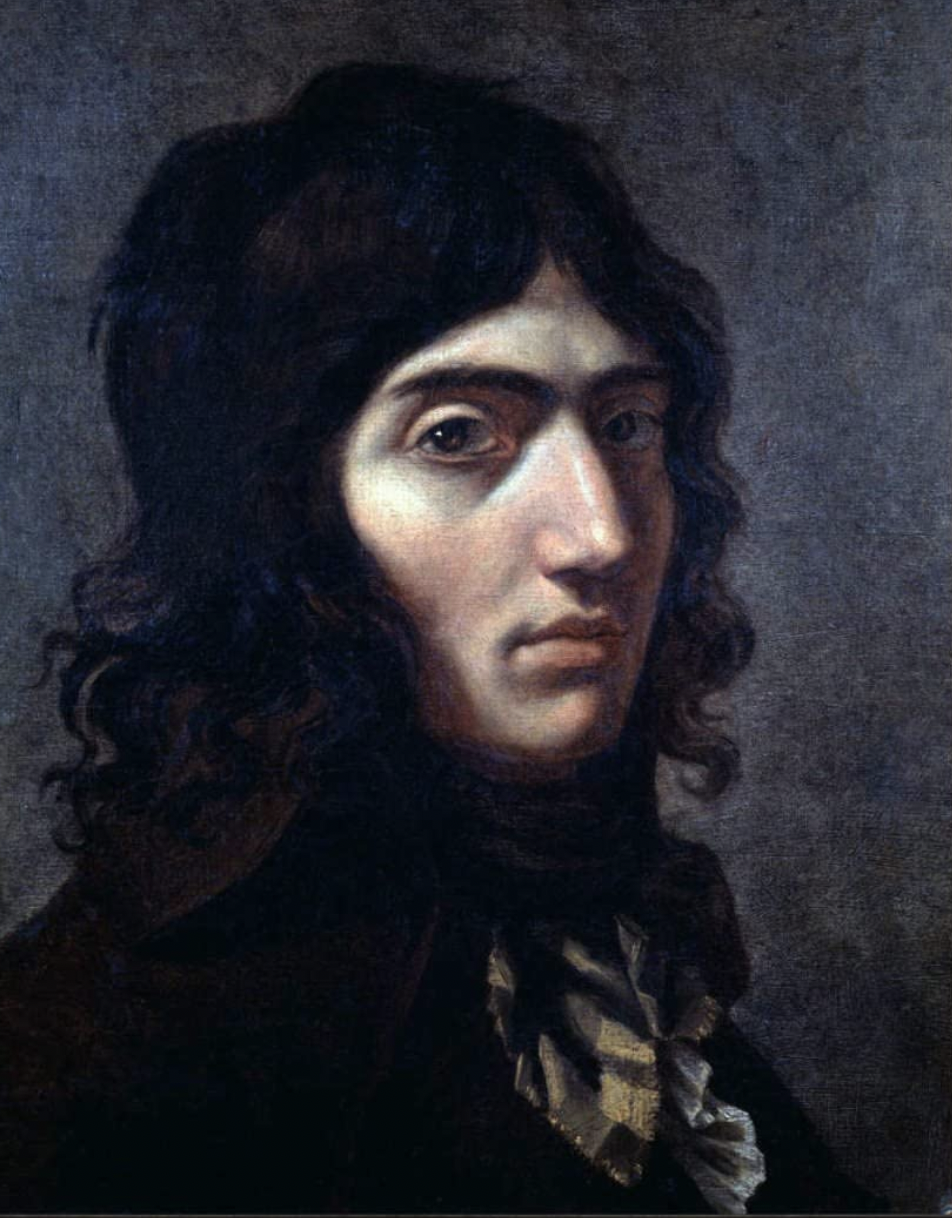
Portrait by Joseph Boze or one of Boze's daughters, c. 1790

In September 1789, Desmoulins issued the first number of a weekly publication, Histoire des Révolutions de France et de Brabant, which would run until the end of July 1791. This publication combined political reportage, revolutionary polemics, satire, and cultural commentary; "The universe and all its follies," Desmoulins had announced, "shall be included in the jurisdiction of this hypercritical journal." The Révolutions de France et de Brabant proved extremely popular from its first to its last number. Desmoulins became notorious, and was able to leave behind the poverty that had marked his previous life in Paris.

The politics of the Révolutions de France et de Brabant were anti-royalist and pro-Revolutionary. The newspaper celebrated the Revolutionary zeal of "patriots" from the battlefields of Brabant to the Cordeliers district in Paris, home to the well-known and powerful revolutionary Club des Cordeliers, which Desmoulins joined in February 1790 and soon became a prominent member, and also criticized the excesses and inequities of, among a wide range of targets, the aristocratic regime. The savagery with which Desmoulins attacked those with whom he disagreed drew lawsuits, criticism, and reciprocal attacks. His previous friendships with powerful figures such as the Comte de Mirabeau and Baron Malouet, suffered. Both men, angered by what they perceived as libellous statements, declared that Desmoulins should be denounced and Malouet "went so far as to ask that Camille be certified insane." The Actes des Apôtres, the equally savage royalist newspaper that served as the Révolutions' opposite number, engaged in a continual war of insults with the Révolutions, and particularly with Desmoulins, whom it dubbed, in a satirical poem, "l'ânon des moulins" (the little jackass of the windmills).

Upon the death of the Comte de Mirabeau in April 1791, Desmoulins (to whom Mirabeau had, at one time, been a great patron and friend) countered the predominantly sentimental and forgiving eulogies that appeared in the Parisian press by publishing a brutal attack in which he declared the late Mirabeau to be the "god of orators, liars, and thieves." This presaged later about-face attacks against prominent and once-sympathetic Revolutionary figures, such as Jean Pierre Brissot, by Desmoulins.

On 16 July 1791, Desmoulins appeared before the Paris Commune as the head of a group petitioning for the deposition of Louis XVI, who had, in June of that year, briefly fled Paris with his family before being captured and escorted back to the city. The flight of the king had caused civil unrest, and the petition, presented a day before the anniversary of the Fête de la Fédération, contributed to this agitation. On July 17, a large crowd that had gathered at the Champ de Mars in support of the petition was fired upon by military forces under the command of the Marquis de Lafayette, an incident which became known as the Champ de Mars Massacre. Accounts differ as to whether or not Desmoulins was present at the Champ de Mars; in the subsequent upheaval, warrants for the arrest of himself and Georges Danton were issued. Danton fled Paris, and Desmoulins, though he remained in the city, and spoke on several occasions at the Jacobin Club, decreased his journalistic activities for a time.

Early in 1792, following a bitter quarrel with Jean Pierre Brissot over a legal case which Desmoulins had taken up and discussed in several broadsheets, Desmoulins published a pamphlet, Jean Pierre Brissot démasqué, which attacked Brissot savagely and personally. In it, Desmoulins claimed that the invented verb brissoter had taken on the meaning "to cheat," and accused Brissot of betraying republicanism. The case constructed against Brissot in this pamphlet was expanded and used to terrible and destructive effect in Desmoulins' later publication of 1793, Fragment de l'histoire secrète de la Révolution (also known as the Histoire des Brissotins), in which the Girondist political faction, of which Brissot was a prominent member, was accused of traitorous and counter-revolutionary activities. This "history," produced in response to calls by Brissot and his followers for the dissolution of the Paris Commune and of the Jacobins, contributed to the arrest and execution of many Girondist leaders, including Brissot himself, in October 1793. Desmoulins intensely regretted his role in the death of the Girondists; present at their trial, he was heard to lament, "O my God! my God! It is I who kill them!" He was seen to collapse in the courtroom when the public prosecutor pronounced the sentence of death.

In the summer of 1793, General Arthur Dillon, a royalist and close friend of Desmoulins and his wife, was imprisoned. In an openly published Lettre au General Dillon, Desmoulins went far beyond the politically delicate act of defending Dillon, and attacked powerful members of the Committee of Public Safety - notably Saint-Just and Billaud-Varenne.

Beginning 5 December 1793, Desmoulins published the journal for which he would be best known and most celebrated: Le Vieux Cordelier. Even the title of this short-lived publication spoke of conflict with the current regime, implying that Desmoulins spoke on behalf of the "old" or original members of the Club des Cordeliers, in opposition to the more radical and extreme factions that had now come into power. In the seven issues that comprised the Vieux Cordelier, Desmoulins condemned the suspicion, brutality, and fear that had come to characterize the Revolution, comparing the ongoing Revolutionary Terror to the oppressive reign of the Roman emperor Tiberius and calling for the establishment of a "Committee of Clemency" to counter the climate of mercilessness fostered by the Committee of Public Safety. In the fourth number of the journal, Desmoulins addressed Robespierre directly, writing, "My dear Robespierre... my old school friend... Remember the lessons of history and philosophy: love is stronger, more lasting than fear." The perceived counter-revolutionary tone in these calls for clemency led to Desmoulins' expulsion from the Club des Cordeliers and denunciation at the Jacobins, as well as, ultimately, to his arrest and execution.

== Political career, Le Vieux Cordelier, and downfall ==
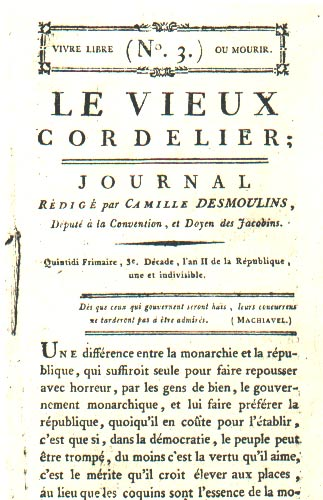
Third issue of Desmoulins' Le Vieux Cordelier

Desmoulins took an active part in the 10 August 1792 attack on the Tuileries Palace. Despite his belief that the turmoil had concluded, Robespierre disagreed by asserting that it marked merely the beginning. Immediately afterwards, as the Legislative Assembly (France) crumbled and various factions contended for control of the country, he was appointed Secretary-General to Georges Danton, who had assumed the role of Justice Minister. On 8 September 1792 he was elected as a deputy from Paris to the new National Convention. He was affiliated with The Mountain, and voted for the establishment of the Republic and the execution of Louis XVI. His political views were closely aligned with those of Danton and, initially, Robespierre.

In autumn 1793, as terror became "the order of the day," Desmoulins began to speak less and less at the Convention. When he did speak, he was one of the few voices calling for clemency; on 16 October 1793 he was one of the rare voices to speak up after the Convention ordered the arrest of all citizens of governments the Republic was at war with, asking for an exception for Dutch who had been prescribed by their government. Desmoulins also assisted in creating the first draft of the Civil Code and pushed for its implementation.

Desmoulins also spoke in support of a measure proposed in August 1793 that would have given spouses an equal right to administer property. In opposition to Conventionnels who argued for the "natural superiority" of the male sex, Desmoulins condemned the puissance maritale, according to which women were legal nonentities under the guardianship of their husbands, calling it "the creation of despotic governments." Later that month, Desmoulins argued in favor of no-fault divorce, denouncing a draft article enumerating limited grounds for divorce on the ground that divorce should be freely available at the request of either spouse – a measure that would not be revived in France in full until 1985.

The first number of Vieux Cordelier appeared on 5 December 1793. Although it was dedicated to Robespierre along with Danton and called them both friends, it marked the start of a rift between Desmoulins and Robespierre. Initially directed, with Robespierre's approval, against the excesses of the ultra-radical Hébertist faction, the journal rapidly expanded and intensified its criticisms of the Committee of Public Safety and the Revolutionary Tribunal. Desmoulins appealed to Robespierre to help steer these institutions in a more moderate direction. On 20 December, Robespierre had proposed the formation of a commission "to examine all detentions promptly and to free the innocent," an idea shot down by Billaud-Varenne, and Desmoulins "seized on this and called for something more dramatic: a committee of clemency" to put an end to the Terror.

In the Vieux Cordelier, especially the third and fourth numbers, Desmoulins criticized the Terror, argued in favor of clemency for prisoners, and demanded the return of freedom of the press:

Certain people apparently believe that liberty, like children, needs to go through cries and tears to get to maturity; on the contrary, it is the nature of liberty that, to enjoy it, we need only desire it. A people is free as soon as it wishes to be, it entered upon its full rights on the 14th of July. Liberty has neither old age nor infancy; she has but one age, that of strength and vigour. [...] No, this liberty which I worship is not an unknown deity. We are fighting in defense of the good things which she puts into the possession of those who invoke her: these good things are the Declaration of Rights, the sweetness of Republican maxims, fraternity, holy equality, and the inviolability of principles. These are the footprints of the goddess, these are the signs by which I distinguish the nations among whom she dwells.

And by what other sign would you wish that I recognize this divine liberty? This liberty, be it but an empty name? Is it only an actress of the Opera, la Candeille or la Maillard paraded about with a red cap on, or that statue, forty-six feet high, that David proposes?; If by liberty you do not mean, as I do, principles, but only a bit of stone, then never has there been an idolatry more stupid and more costly than ours.

Oh my dear fellow citizens! Shall we so far debase ourselves as to fall at the feet of such divinities? No, this Liberty descended from Heaven is not a nymph of the Opera, not a red cap, a dirty shirt, or rags and tatters. Liberty is happiness, reason, equality; she is justice, she is embodied in the Declaration of Rights, in your sublime Constitution. Would you have me acknowledge her, fall at her feet, spill my blood for her? Open the prisons of those two hundred thousand citizens whom you call “suspects,” for in the Declaration of Rights there was no prison for suspected persons, but only for felons. Suspicion has no prison, it has the public prosecutor; there are no suspected persons but those who are accused of crime by the law. Do not believe that this measure would be fatal to the Republic, it would be the most revolutionary step you have ever taken.

Desmoulins used a variety of arguments to support his proposal, including pragmatic arguments and historical analysis, making especially heavy use of parallels to Ancient Rome:

"You wish to exterminate all your enemies by the guillotine! But was there ever greater folly? Can you kill one person on the scaffold without making yourselves ten more enemies amongst his family and his friends? [...]

I am of a very different opinion from those who claim that it is necessary to leave Terror on the order of the day. I am confident, on the contrary, that liberty will be assured and Europe conquered so soon as you have a Committee of Clemency. This committee will complete the Revolution, for clemency is itself a Revolutionary measure, the most effective of all when it is wisely dealt out.

Let imbeciles and rascals call me moderate, if they want. I am certainly not ashamed not to be more outraged than M. Brutus yet this is what Brutus wrote: You would do better, my dear Cicero, to put more effort into cutting short the civil wars than in losing your temper and pursuing your personal resentments against the vanquished."

Desmoulins also argued fervently in favor of renewed freedom of the press, stating that "if freedom of the press existed in a country where the most absolute despotism unites all powers in a single hand, it alone would suffice to act as a counterweight." He criticized the extreme repression of freedom of the press in revolutionary France:

What journalist in France would dare point out the errors of our committees, our generals, the Jacobins, the ministers, or the Commune the way the opposition does to those of the British ministry? Am I, a Frenchman, I, Camille Desmoulins, not as free as an English journalist? The very idea makes me indignant. Let no one tell me that we are in a revolution and that freedom of the press must be suspended during a revolution. Isn’t England, isn’t all of Europe, also in a state of revolution? Are the principles of freedom of the press less sacred in Paris than in London? [...] Can it be that when on one side servitude and venality hold the pen, and on the other freedom and virtue, that there is the least danger that the people, the judge of this combat, could pass to the side of slavery? To even fear such a thing is to insult human reason! Can reason fear a duel with stupidity? I repeat: Only counter-revolutionaries, only traitors, only Pitt, could have an interest in prohibiting unlimited freedom of the press in France; freedom and truth can never fear the pen of servitude and lies.

In his fourth number, Desmoulins addressed Robespierre directly: "O! my dear Robespierre! ... O my old school friend! you whose eloquent words posterity will reread! Remember the lessons of history of philosophy: that love is stronger, more enduring than fear; that admiration and religion were born of generosity; that acts of clemency are the ladder of myth, as was said by Tertullien, by which members of the Committee of Public Safety have risen to the skies; men never climb thither on stairs of blood."

Desmoulins made strong use of pragmatic arguments, arguing that the excessive use of terror would cause the people to detest the Revolution and lead to a counter-revolutionary backlash. He backed up his arguments with a variety of sources from history and political theory, including Machiavelli's The Prince, arguing that generosity and the distribution of favors help a sovereign gain and maintain popularity while the indiscriminate use of violence leads to the sovereign becoming detested and overthrown.

Although Desmoulins harshly criticized Hébert's demands for the increased use of terror, he explicitly opposed Hébert's arrest in his fifth number. In his seventh and final number, authored in March 1794, unpublished during his lifetime, he again implicitly sided with Hébert, stating that he preferred the incessant denunciations of the Hébertists over the icy silence and bourgeois politeness of the Jacobins:

I would prefer that we denounce wrongly and indiscriminately, I would even say calumniate, like Père Duchesne, but with that vigour that characterises strong spirits and a republican temper, than to see, today, this bourgeois politeness, this puerile and honest civility, these pusillanimous considerations of the monarchy, this circumspection … for the strongest, for men of credibility or position, ministers or generals, representatives of the people or influential members of the Jacobins, while we melt with heavy stiffness into patriotism in disfavor and disgrace. [...]

Better would be the intemperance of the language of democracy, the pessimism of these eternal detractors of the present, whose bile pours out on everything around them, than this cold poison of fear, which freezes thought to the bottom of the soul, and prevents it from springing up at the Tribune or in writings. Better would be the misanthropy of Timon, who can find nothing beautiful in Athens, than this general terror, like mountains of ice, which, from one end of France to the other, covers the sea of opinion and obstructs its ebb and flow.

The currency of Republics are the winds that blow over the waves of the sea, with this caption: Tollunt sed attollunt. They agitate but they elevate.

Otherwise, I no longer see in the Republic anything but the flat calm of despotism and the smooth surface of the stagnant waters of a swamp; I see in it only an equality of fear, the leveling of courage, and the most generous spirits as base as the most vulgar.

Desmoulins also reiterated his opposition to the war with Austria and its allies, stating that "war will always be the resource of despotism, which by its very nature has no power but that of arms and can gain nothing except at the point of a sword." He accused Robespierre of hypocrisy for entirely reversing his views on the war, which he had originally opposed.

On 7 January 1794, the Jacobin Club sought to expel Desmoulins from its number. Robespierre, initially seeking to protect Desmoulins, suggested as an alternative that the offending issues of the Vieux Cordelier be publicly burnt. Desmoulins' response, "Brûler n'est pas répondre" ("Burning is not answering"), echoed the cry of Jean-Jacques Rousseau, the influential philosopher whose work was central to Robespierre's own vision of the Republic. Robespierre responded to this by calling Desmoulins a "spoilt child" and saying that: "Camille, that if you weren't Camille, we wouldn't have so much indulgence for you. We treat you like a lost child, and you dare to complain. [...] Well, since he wishes it, let him be covered in ignominy." Despite this, Desmoulins refused to renounce the Vieux Cordelier.

Also in the seventh number, Desmoulins expressed his view that it was freedom of the press and the form of government, rather than virtue, that was the essential basis of a republic. In this, he again directly countered the views of Robespierre.

Meanwhile, the participation of Danton's personal secretary, Fabre d'Églantine, in a financial scam with the East India Company became exposed and he was arrested for corruption and forgery. This scandal cast doubt on Danton and his allies, and Robespierre now supported the expulsion of Desmoulins from the Jacobin club. After the condemnation and execution of the Hébertists in March 1794, the energies of the Montagnards (especially of Saint-Just) turned to the elimination of the indulgent faction headed by Danton and voiced by Desmoulins. They were accused of corruption, royalist tendencies, and counter-revolutionary conspiracy, charges were brought before the Committee of Public Safety, and arrest warrants including for Desmoulins were finally issued on 31 March.

== Trial and execution ==
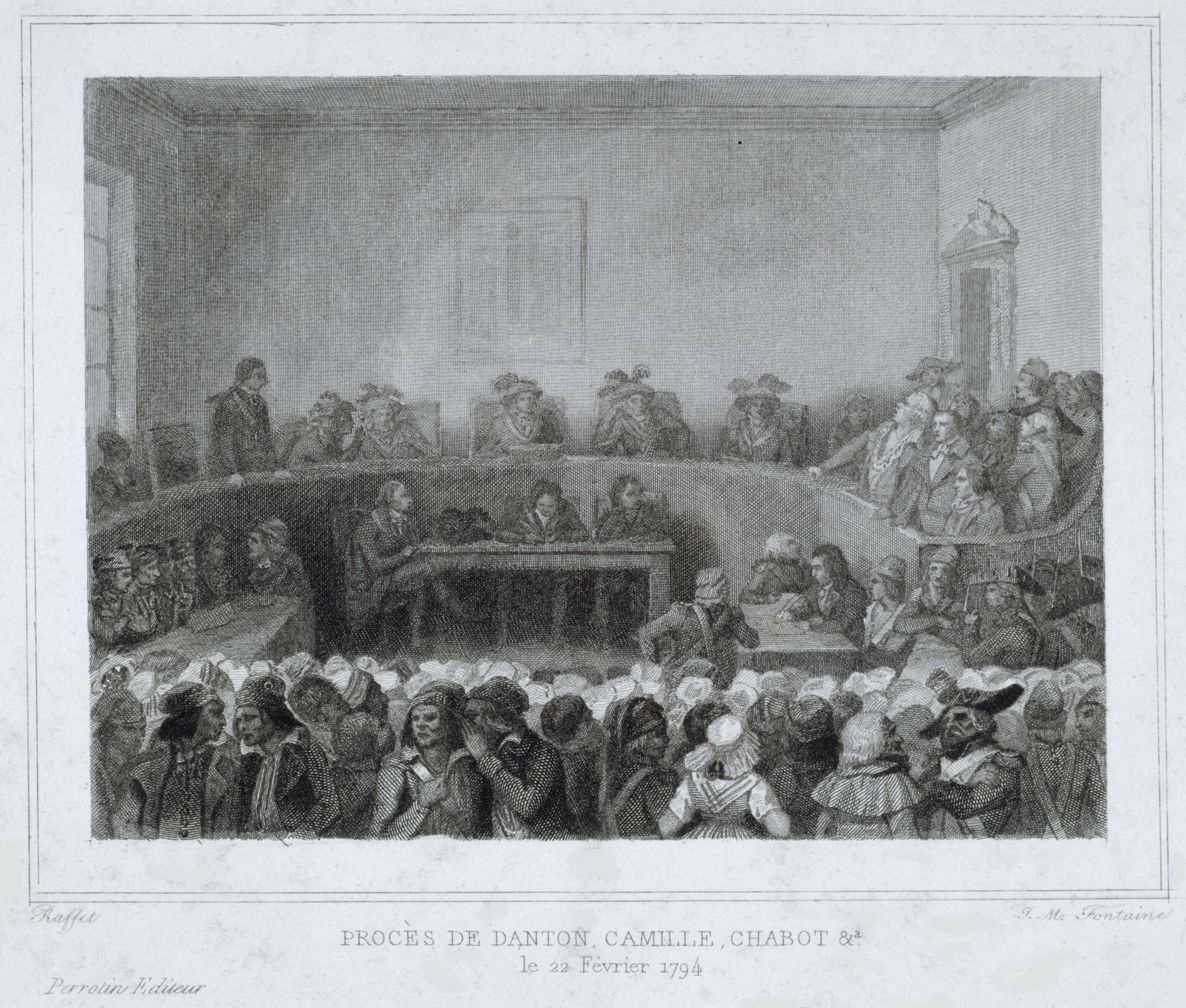
Desmoulins and Danton before the Revolutionary Tribunal

Danton, Desmoulins, and many other actual or accused Dantonist associates were tried from April 3 through 5th before the Revolutionary Tribunal. The trial was less criminal in nature than political, and as such unfolded in an irregular fashion. When asked his name and age, Desmoulins responded with: "Benoît Camille Desmoulins, age of thirty-three – the age of Jesus, a critical age for patriots." The accused were prevented from defending themselves by a decree of the National Convention. This fact, together with confusing and often incidental denunciations (for instance, a report that Danton, while engaged in political work in Brussels, had appropriated a carriage filled with several hundred thousand livres of table linen) and threats made by prosecutor Antoine Quentin Fouquier-Tinville (Desmoulins' cousin) towards members of the jury, helped to ensure a guilty verdict. Additionally, the accused were denied the right to have witnesses appear on their behalf, though they had submitted requests for several—including, in Desmoulins' case, Robespierre. The verdict was passed in the absence of the accused, who had been removed from the courtroom to prevent unrest among the trial's observers. Their execution was scheduled for the same day.

In a letter to his wife from the Luxembourg Prison, Desmoulins wrote,

[I]t is marvellous that I have walked for five years along the precipices of the Revolution without falling over them, and that I am still living; and I rest my head calmly upon the pillow of my writings... I have dreamed of a Republic such as all the world would have adored. I could never have believed that men could be so ferocious and so unjust.

As Desmoulins was taken to the scaffold, he was informed of his wife's arrest and went mad. It took several men to get him to the tumbril. He struggled and tried to plead with the mob, ripping his shirt in the process. Lucile, together with 27 others political detainees was hastily convicted for conspiracy, sentenced to death, and executed, eight days later. Of the group of fifteen who were guillotined together on 5 April 1794, including Marie Jean Hérault de Séchelles, Philippe Fabre d'Églantine and Pierre Philippeaux, Desmoulins died third, and Danton last. Desmoulins and his guillotined associates were buried in the Errancis Cemetery, a common place of interment for those executed during the Revolution. In the mid-19th century, their skeletal remains were transferred to the Catacombs of Paris.

== Family ==
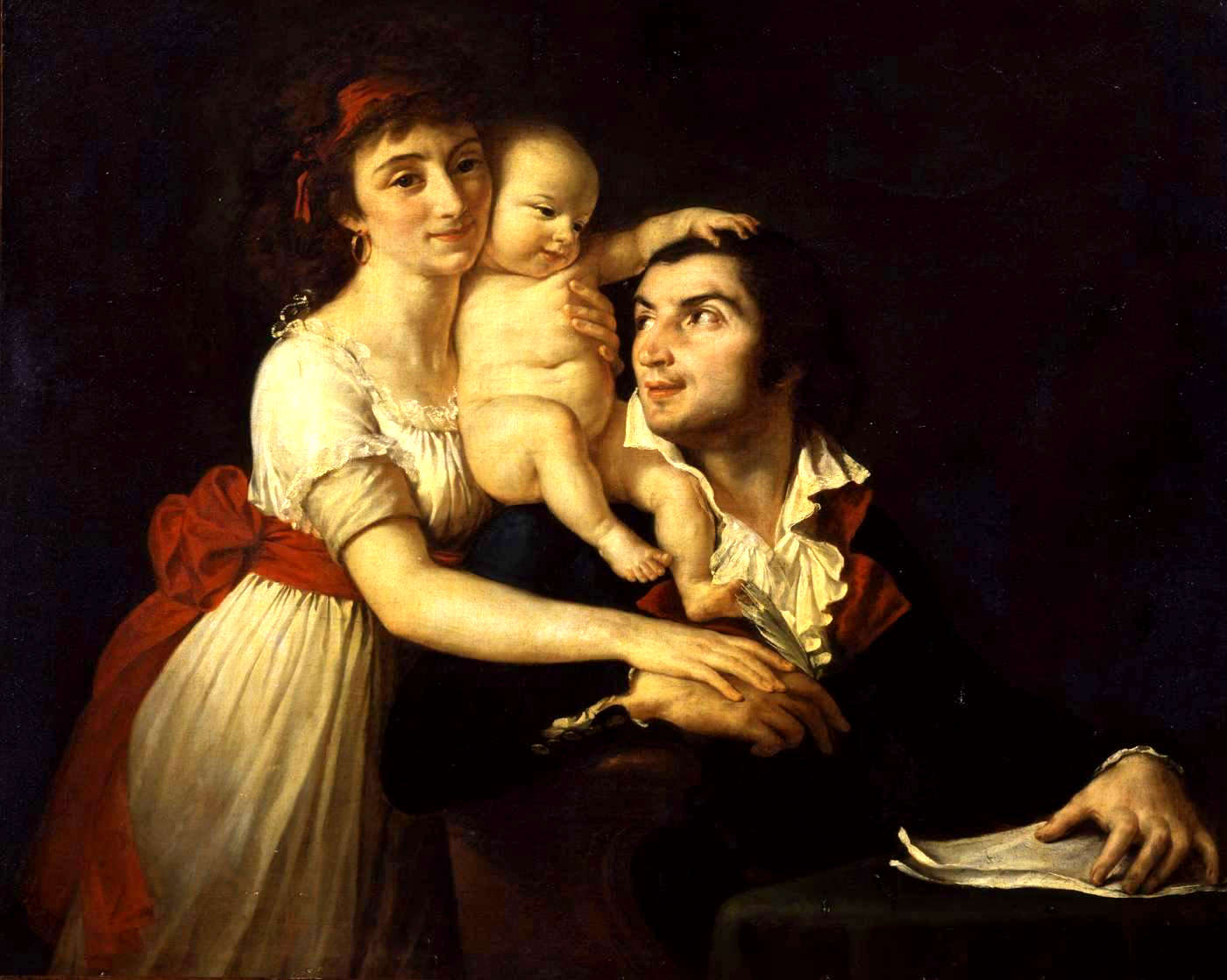
Camille Desmoulins, his wife Lucile and their son Horace-Camille, c. 1792

On 29 December 1790 Desmoulins married Lucile Duplessis, whom he had known for many years. Lucile's father long denied permission for the marriage, believing that the life of a journalist could not support any sort of family. Among the witnesses to the marriage were Robespierre, Brissot, and Jérôme Pétion de Villeneuve. The wedding took place at the Saint-Sulpice Church in Paris. The Desmoulins' only child, Horace Camille, was born on 6 July 1792.

Lucile Desmoulins was arrested mere days after her husband and condemned to the guillotine on charges of conspiring to free her husband from prison and plotting the "ruin of the Republic." She was executed on 13 April 1794, the same day as the widow of Jacques Hébert. In a last note to her mother she wrote, "A tear falls from my eyes for you. I shall go to sleep in the calm of innocence. Lucile."

Horace Camille Desmoulins was raised by Adèle and Annette Duplessis (the sister and mother of Lucile, respectively), who successfully petitioned the Comité de législation in February 1795 for the suspension of the sale of his father's belongings. He married Zoë Villefranche and they had four children. He was later pensioned by the French government, and died in 1825 in Haiti.

== In popular culture ==
Camille Desmoulins is among the central characters in the following works:

- Danton's Death (play, 1837) by Georg Büchner
- The Danton Case (play, 1929) by Stanisława Przybyszewska
- Danton (film, 1982) dir. Andrzej Wajda
- La Révolution française (film/miniseries, 1989)
- A Place of Greater Safety (novel, 1992) by Hilary Mantel
- The Gods Are Thirsty (novel, 1996) by Tanith Lee
- A Declaration of the Rights of Magicians (novel, 2020) by H. G. Parry

There is also a scene in Jefferson in Paris (film; 1995) where Camille Desmoulins makes his famous call to arms in the start of the French revolution. Vincent Cassel plays the part of Desmoulins.

== See also ==
- Félix Charpentier. Sculptor of bronze statue of Camille Desmoulins in the place d'Armes in Guise
