= Indulgents =

Political faction of the French Revolution

The Indulgents, or Dantonists (French: Dantonistes [dɑ̃n.tɔ̃.ists]) was a political faction formed around 1793 and centered around Georges Danton.

During the French Revolution, what was previously referred to as modérantisme changed after the fall of the Girondins, when revolutionaries around Danton and Camille Desmoulins also began to want to slow down the revolution in its violence. Another two famous Dantonists were Marie-Jean Hérault de Séchelles and Fabre d'Églantine. Although not a Dantonist, Jacques-Nicolas Billaud-Varenne maintained close relations with Danton. The name "Indulgents" was a derogatory term for Robespierre.

The movement emerged in the summer of 1793 as the moderate wing of the Cordeliers. At the same time, a group around Jacques Hébert developed in the other direction (Hébertists), which also met with the displeasure of the Jacobins, which also led to their destruction, two months before the Indulgents (February 1794 to April 1794).

== See also ==
- Modérantisme
