= List of journals appearing under the French Revolution =

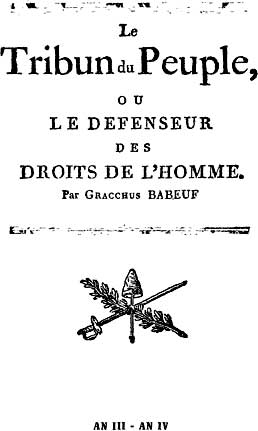
Le Tribun du peuple de Gracchus Babeuf

List of Journals appearing during the French Revolution :

== A ==
- Les Actes des Apôtres (royalist) : Journiac de Saint-Méard, Suleau
- Les Annales patriotiques : Louis-Sébastien Mercier, Jean-Louis Carra
- Les Annales politiques : Simon-Nicolas-Henri Linguet
- L'Ami des citoyens : Jean-Lambert Tallien
- L'Ami des Lois: a Parisian newspaper published in 1795-1798)
- L'Ami des Théophilanthropes : Armand-Joseph Guffroy
- L'Ami du peuple : Jean-Paul Marat
- L'Ami du peuple par Leclerc : Jean-Théophile Leclerc
- L'Ami du roi : Christophe Félix Louis Ventre de la Touloubre Galart de Montjoie
- L'Anti-Fédéraliste : (Comité de salut public) inspired by Maximilien de Robespierre
- L'Anti-fédéraliste : Claude-François de Payan
- L'Apocalypse : Mirabeau
- L'Argus patriote : Charles Theveneau de Morande

== B ==
- La Bouche de fer : Claude Fauchet, Nicolas de Bonneville
- Bulletin du tribunal révolutionnaire : Jean-Baptiste Coffinhal

== C ==
- Le Chien et le Chat : Jacques René Hébert
- La Chronique de Paris : Condorcet
- La Chronique du mois : Jean-Marie Collot d'Herbois, Étienne Clavière, Condorcet
- Le Conservateur : Dominique Joseph Garat, Marie-Joseph Chénier, François Daunou
- Le Contrepoison ou préservatif contre les motions insidieuses: (journal royaliste)
- Le Correspondant d'Eure-et-Loir : Pierre Jacques Michel Chasles
- Le Correspondant picard (1789) : François-Noël Babeuf, dit Grachus Babeuf
- Le Cosmopolite : Berthold Proli
- Courrier de l'Égypte : published in French-occupied Egypt
- Le Courier de l'Europe : Samuel Swinton, puis Radix de Sainte-Foix (propriétaires), Alphonse-Joseph Serre de la Tour, puis Charles Théveneau de Morande (directeurs)
- Le Courrier de Brabant : Camille Desmoulins
- Le Courrier de Provence : Mirabeau
- Le Courrier de Versailles à Paris et de Paris à Versailles (de 1789 à 1792) : Antoine-Joseph Gorsas

== D ==
- Les Dames nationales ou le Kalendrier des citoyennes : Restif de La Bretonne
- Le Défenseur de la liberté : Pierre Philippeaux

== F ==
- La France vue de l'armée d'Italie : Michel Regnaud de Saint-Jean d'Angély

== G ==
- La Gazette : Théophraste Renaudot, Fallet, Chamfort
- Il Giornale patriotico di Corsica : Philippe Buonarrotti

== H ==
- Histoire des Révolutions de France et de Brabant : Camille Desmoulins

== J ==
- Journal de la liberté de la presse : François Noël Babeuf dite Gracchus Babeuf
- Journal de Malte : published in French-occupied Malta
- Journal de la Montagne
- Journal de l'opposition : Pierre-François Réal
- Journal de Paris : Corancez, Antoine Cadet de Vaux, Dussieux, N. Xhrouet
- Journal de Paris : Michel Louis Étienne Regnault de Saint-Jean d'Angely
- Journal de Perlet : Charles Frédéric Perlet
- Journal des amis de la Constitution : Pierre Choderlos de Laclos
- Journal des Défenseurs de la patrie
- Journal des débats
- Journal des Halles
- Journal des laboureurs : Joseph Lequinio
- Journal des lois : Charles-Nicolas Osselin
- Journal du soir sans réflexions et courriers de Paris et de Londres : Étienne Feuillant
- Le Journal du soir sans réflexions et le courrier de la capitale : Étienne Feuillant; Denis Tremblay et Jacques René Hébert
- Journal général : l'abbé Fontenai
- Journal politique et littéraire : Simon-Nicolas-Henri Linguet

== L ==
- La lanterne magique : Boisset
- Lettres à mes commettants : Mirabeau
- Lettres bougrement patriotiques du Père Duchêne : Antoine Lemaire

== M ==
- La Manufacture
- Le Mémorial : Jean-François de La Harpe, Fontanes, Vauxelles
- Le Miroir : Claude François Beaulieu (journal royaliste)
- Le Moniteur Universel : Charles-Joseph Panckouke

== N ==
- Nouvelles ecclésiastiques

== O ==
- Observateur : Gabriel Feydel
- L'Orateur du peuple : Stanislas Fréron

== P ==
- Le Patriote français : Jacques Pierre Brissot
- Le Père Duchesne : Jacques Hébert
- Le Père Duchêne de Jean Charles Jumel : Abbé Jean Charles Jumel
- Les Petites affiches : Pierre Bénézech
- Le Point du jour : Barère de Vieuzac
- Le Publiciste de la République française: Jacques Roux

== Q ==
- La Quotidienne: Coutouli et Ripert (journal royaliste)

== R ==
- Le Républicain: Duval
- Le Républicain : Sophie de Condorcet, Nicolas de Condorcet, Thomas Paine
- Retour du Père Duchêne, premier poêlier du monde : M. de Mont-Lucy
- Le Réveil du peuple
- La Révolution de 1792 : Louis Ange Pitou
- Les Révolutions de France et de Brabant : Camille Desmoulins
- Les Révolutions de Paris : Elisée Loustalot, Sylvain Maréchal, Fabre d'Églantine, Pierre-Gaspard Chaumette, Léger-Félicité Sonthonax
- Le Rougyff ou le franc en vedette : Armand-Joseph Guffroy

== S ==
- La Sentinelle : Louvet, François Daunou

== T ==
- Le Thermomètre du jour : Jacques-Antoine Dulaure
- Le Tocsin de Liège
- La Tribune des patriotes : Camille Desmoulins, Louis-Marie Stanislas Fréron
- Le Tribun du peuple : Gracchus Babeuf

== V ==
- Le Vieux Cordelier : Camille Desmoulins
- Les Vitres cassées (1789) : Antoine Lemaire
