= Jean-Baptiste Say =

French economist and businessman (1767–1832)

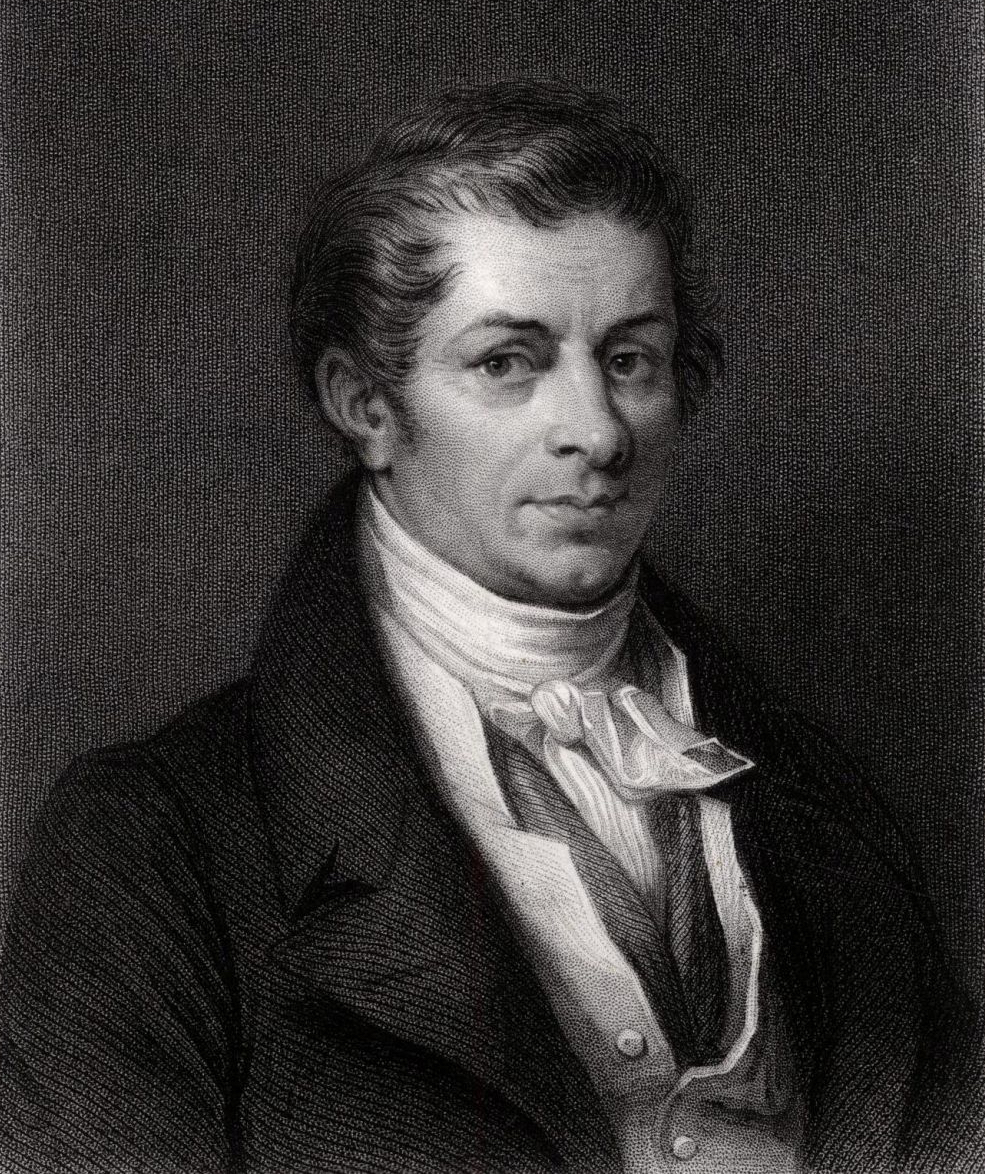
- Born: 5 January 1767; Lyon, Kingdom of France
- Died: 15 November 1832 (aged 65); Paris, France

Academic background
- Influences: Richard Cantillon, Adam Smith, Pietro Verri

Academic work
- Discipline: Political economy
- School or tradition: French Liberal School
- Notable ideas: Say's law, entrepreneurship

Jean-Baptiste Say (French: [ʒɑ̃batist sɛ]; 5 January 1767 – 15 November 1832) was a liberal French economist and businessman who argued in favor of competition, free trade, and lifting restraints on business. He is best known for Say's law—also known as the law of markets—which he popularized, although scholars disagree as to whether it was Say who first articulated the theory. Moreover, he was one of the first economists to study entrepreneurship and conceptualized entrepreneurs as organizers and leaders of the economy. He was also closely involved in the development of the École spéciale de commerce et d'industrie (ESCP), historically the first business school to be established.

== Early life ==
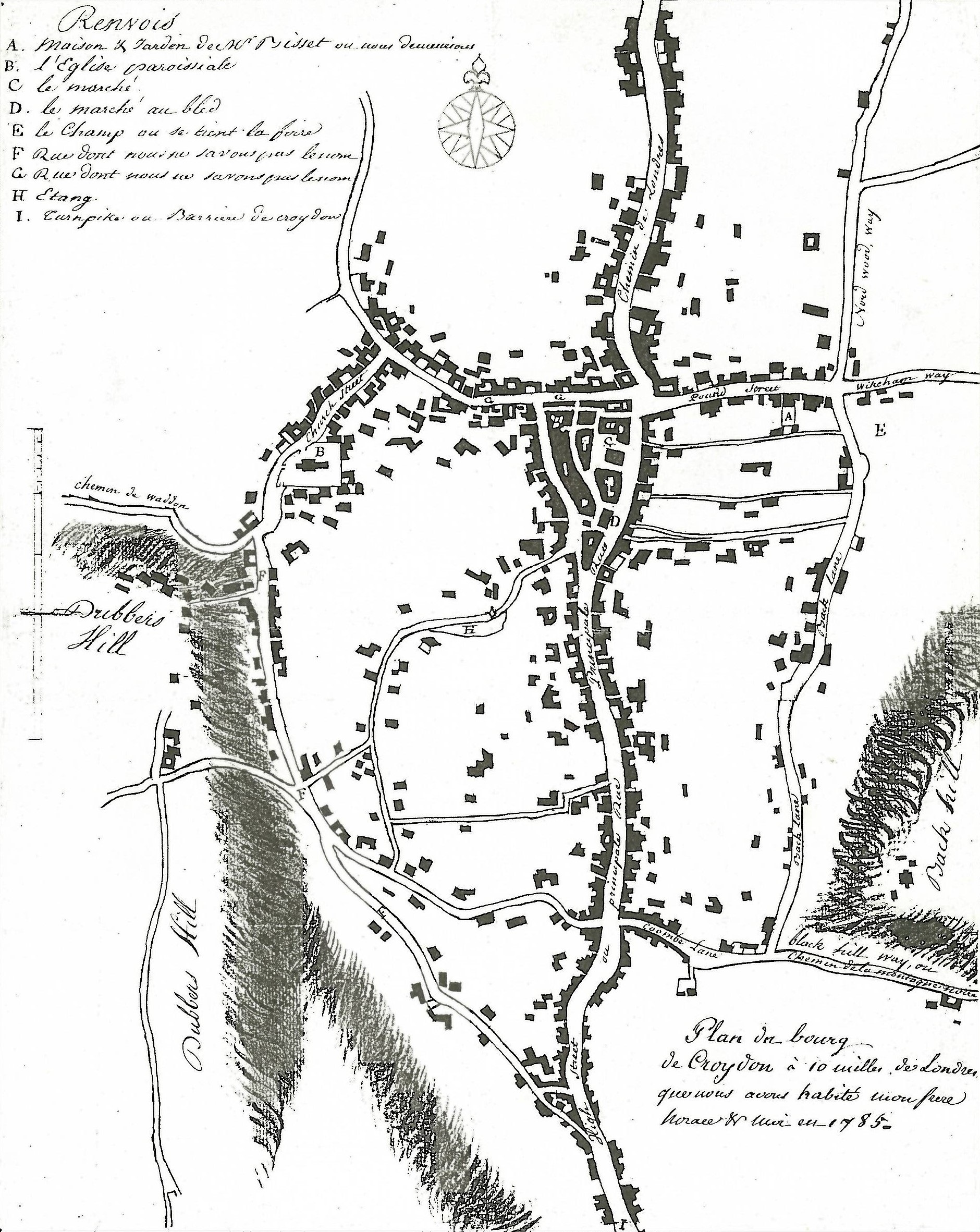
Map of Croydon, drawn by the 18-year-old Say in 1785

Say was born in Lyon. His father Jean-Etienne Say was born to a Protestant family which had moved from Nîmes to Geneva for some time in consequence of the revocation of the Edict of Nantes. Say was intended to follow a commercial career and in 1785 was sent with his brother Horace to complete his education in England. He lodged for a time in Croydon and afterwards (following a return visit to France) in Fulham. During the latter period, he was employed successively by two London-based firms of sugar merchants, James Baillie & Co and Samuel and William Hibbert. At the end of 1786, he accompanied Samuel Hibbert on a voyage to France which ended in December with Hibbert's death in Nantes. Say returned to Paris, where he found employment in the office of a life assurance company directed by Étienne Clavière. His brother Louis Auguste (1774–1840) also became an economist.

== Writings, teaching and entrepreneurship ==
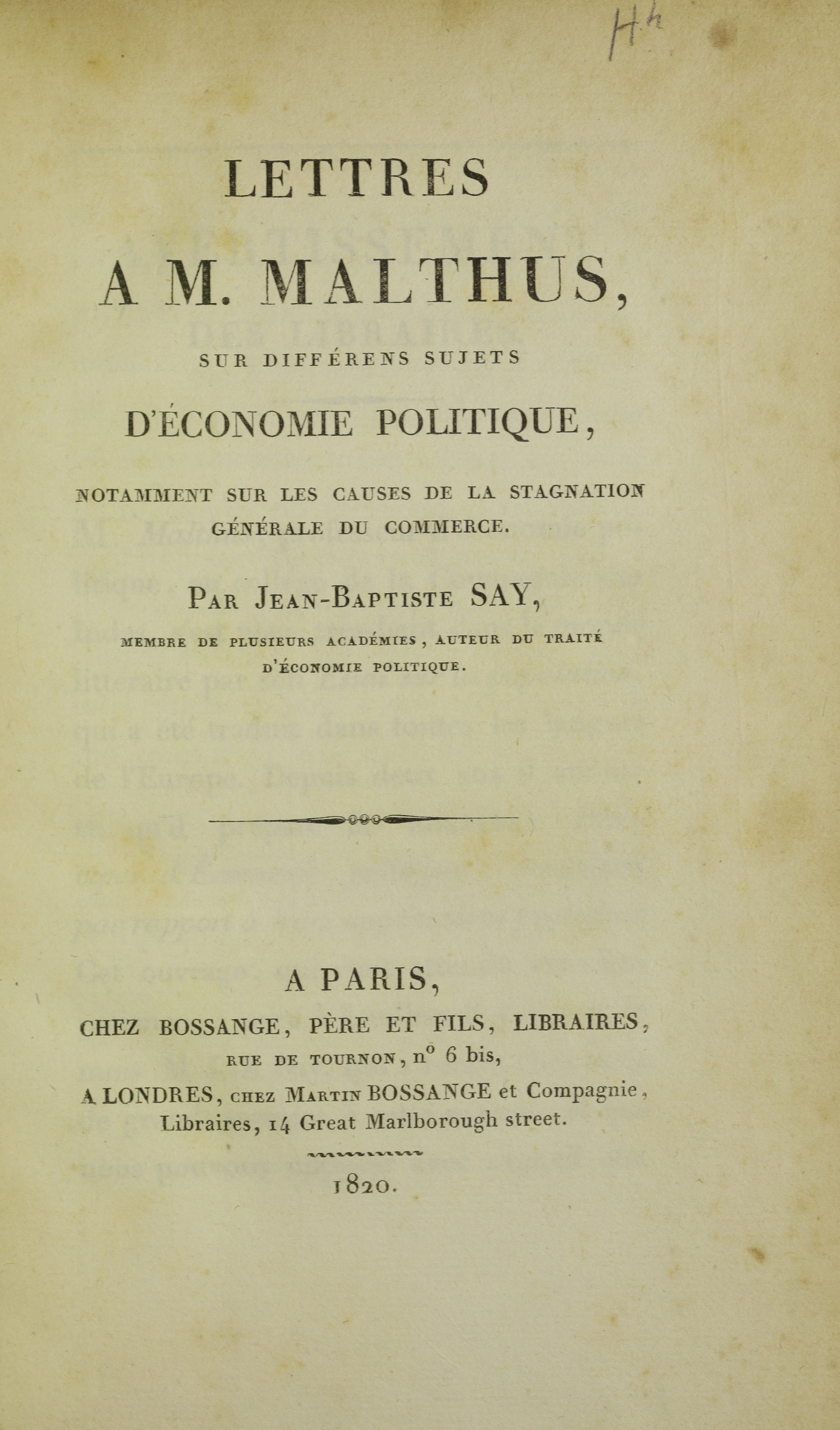
Title page of Say's Lettres à M. Malthus, sur différens sujets d'économie politique, published in 1820

Say's first literary attempt was a pamphlet on the liberty of the press, published in 1789. He later worked under Mirabeau on the Courrier de Provence. In 1792, he took part as a volunteer in the campaign of Champagne. In 1793, he assumed in keeping with French Revolutionary fashion the pseudonym Atticus and became secretary to Étienne Clavière, the then finance minister.

From 1794 to 1800, he edited a periodical, entitled La Decade philosophique, litteraire, et politique, in which he expounded the doctrines of Adam Smith. He had by this time established his reputation as a publicist and when the consular government was established in 1799 he was selected as one of the 100 members of the Tribunat, resigning the editorship of the Decade. In 1798, Say published Olbie, ou essai sur les moyens de réformer les mœurs d'une nation. In 1803, he published his principal work, the Traité d'économie politique ou simple exposition de la manière dont se forment, se distribuent et se composent les richesses. Having proved unwilling to compromise his convictions in the interests of Napoleon, Say was removed from the office of tribune in 1804. He turned to industrial activities and after having familiarised himself with the processes of cotton manufacture he established a spinning-mill at Auchy-lès-Hesdin in the Pas de Calais which employed some 400–500 people, mainly women and children. He devoted his leisure time to revising his economic treatise which had been out of print for some time, but the system of state censorship in place prevented him from republishing it.

In 1814, Say availed himself (to use his own words) of the relative liberty arising from the entrance of the allied powers into France to bring out a second edition of the work dedicated to the emperor Alexander I of Russia, who had professed himself his pupil. In the same year, the French government sent him to study the economic condition of the United Kingdom. The results of his observations appeared in a tract, De l'Angleterre et des Anglais. A third edition of the Traité appeared in 1817.

A chair of industrial economy was established for him in 1819 at the Conservatoire des Arts et Métiers. In 1825, he became a member of the improvement council of the École spéciale de commerce et d'industrie, later renamed École Supérieure de Commerce de Paris, now ESCP Business School, one of the first business schools in the world. In 1831, he was made professor of political economy at the Collège de France. In 1828–1830, he published his Cours complet d'économie politique pratique.

== Say's law ==
Say is well known for Say's law, or the law of markets, often controversially summarised as:

- "Aggregate supply creates its own aggregate demand"
- "Supply creates its own demand"

Say's law is instead uncontroversially summarized as:

- "Supply constitutes its own demand"
- "Inherent in supply is the wherewithal for its own consumption" (direct translation from French Traité d'économie politique)

The exact phrase "supply creates its own demand" was coined by John Maynard Keynes, who criticized it as in the former two, equating all four of these statements to mean the same thing. Some economists, including some advocates of Say's law who dispute this characterization as a misrepresentation, have disputed his interpretation, claiming that Say's law can actually be summarized more accurately as "production precedes consumption" and that Say was claiming that in order to consume one must produce something of value so that one can trade this (either in the form of money or barter) in order to consume later.

Similar sentiments through different wordings appear in the work of John Stuart Mill (1848) and his father James Mill (1808). The Scottish classical economist James Mill restates Say's law in 1808, writing that "production of commodities creates, and is the one and universal cause which creates a market for the commodities produced".

In Say's language, "products are paid for with products" (1803, p. 153) or "a glut can take place only when there are too many means of production applied to one kind of product and not enough to another" (1803, pp. 178–179). Explaining his point at length, he wrote the following:

It is worthwhile to remark that a product is no sooner created than it, from that instant, affords a market for other products to the full extent of its own value. When the producer has put the finishing hand to his product, he is most anxious to sell it immediately, lest its value should diminish in his hands. Nor is he less anxious to dispose of the money he may get for it; for the value of money is also perishable. But the only way of getting rid of money is in the purchase of some product or other. Thus the mere circumstance of creation of one product immediately opens a vent for other products.

Say also wrote that it is not the abundance of money, but the abundance of other products in general that facilitates sales:

Money performs but a momentary function in this double exchange; and when the transaction is finally closed, it will always be found, that one kind of commodity has been exchanged for another.

Say's law may also have been culled from Ecclesiastes 5:11 – "When goods increase, they are increased that eat them: and what good is there to the owners thereof, saving the beholding of them with their eyes?" (KJV). Say's law has been considered by John Kenneth Galbraith as "the most distinguished example of the stability of economic ideas, including when they are wrong".

Say's law emerged during the early period of the Industrial Revolution, at a time when the economic phenomena of increased output merged with England's cyclical inability to maintain both sales and unemployment. This led many to believe that there was a limit to the growth of production, and there may come a point when there is no means of purchasing all output generated. Say's law of markets deals with the fact that production of commodities causes income to be paid to suppliers of the components of capital, labor, and land used in producing these goods and services. The sale price of these commodities is the sum of the payments of wages, rents, and profit. Income generated during production of a commodity equals the value of that commodity. Therefore, an increase in the supply of output will result in an increase in the income necessary to generate demand for those products.

== Theory of entrepreneurship ==
In the Treatise, his main economic work, Say stated that any production process required effort, knowledge and the "application" of the entrepreneur. According to him, entrepreneurs are intermediaries in the production process who combine productive agents such as land, capital and labor in order to meet the demand of consumers. As a result, they play a central role in the economy and fulfil a coordinating role.

Besides studying large-scale entrepreneurs, Say looked at people working for themselves:

When a workman carries on an enterprise on his own account, as the knife grinder in the streets, he is both workman and entrepreneur.

Say also thought about which qualities are essential for successful entrepreneurs and highlighted the quality of judgement. To his mind, entrepreneurs have to continuously assess market needs and the means which could meet them, which requires an "unerring market sense".

As he emphasized the coordinating function of entrepreneurs, Say viewed entrepreneurial income primarily as high wages that are paid in compensation for the skills and expert knowledge of entrepreneurs. He did so by making a distinction between the enterprise function and the supply-of-capital-function which allowed him to look at the earnings of the entrepreneur on the one hand and the remuneration of capital on the other hand. This clearly differentiates his theory from that of Joseph Schumpeter, who described entrepreneurial rent as short-term profits that compensate for high risk (Schumpeterian rent). Say also touched upon risk and uncertainty as well as innovation when discussing entrepreneurship, although he never deeply investigated their relationships. However, Say stated:

[In any enterprise activity] there is an abundance of obstacles to be surmounted, of anxieties to be repressed, of misfortunes to be repaired, and of expedients to be devised [...] [and] there is always a degree of risk attending such undertakings.

Sometimes a manufacturer discovers a process, calculated either to introduce a new product, to increase the beauty of an old one, or to produce with greater economy.

== Personal life ==
In 1793, Say married Mlle Deloche, daughter of a former lawyer.

== Honours ==
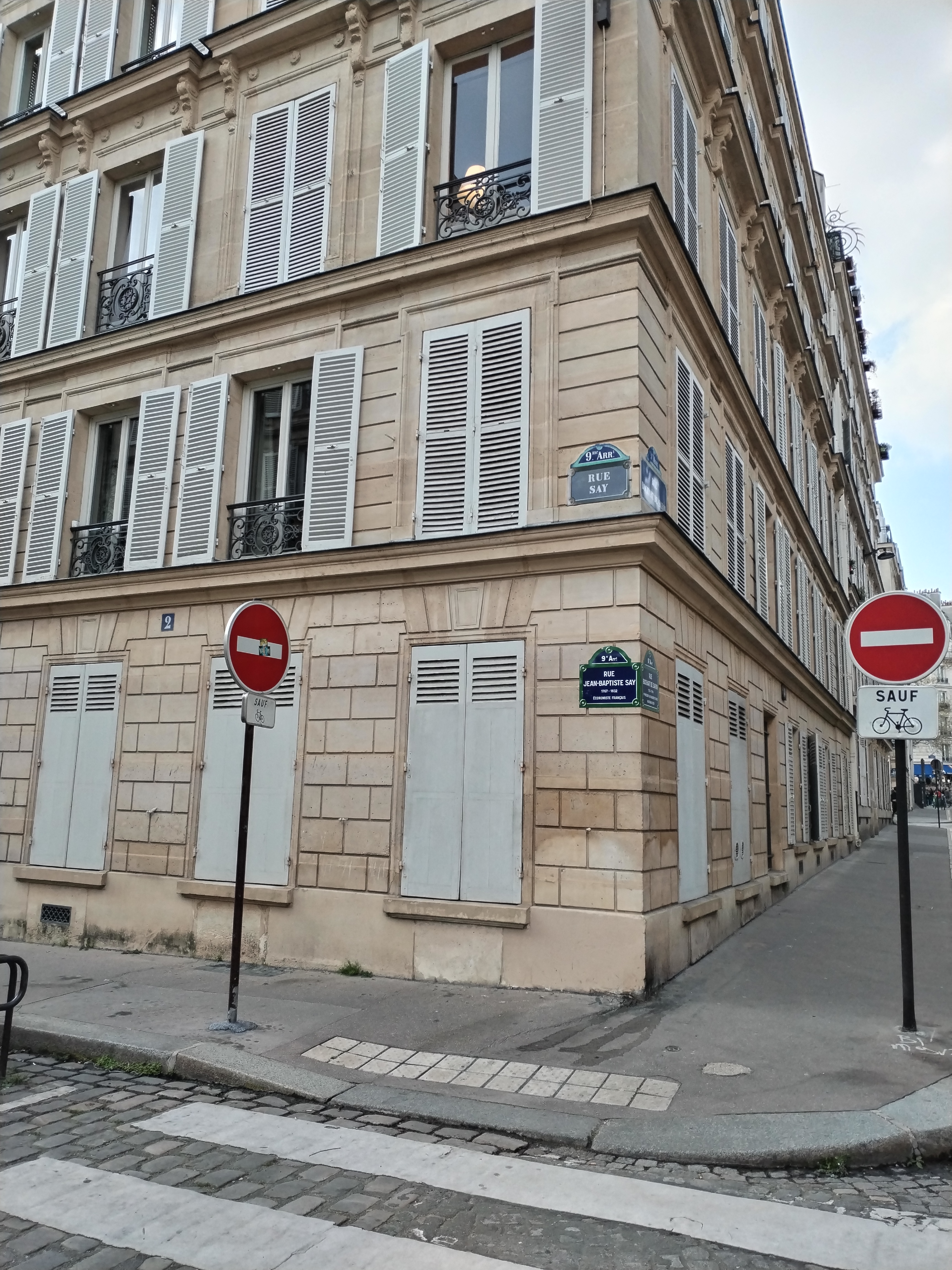
Rue Jean-Baptiste Say, 9th arrondissement of Paris

In 1826, Say was elected a foreign member of the Royal Swedish Academy of Sciences.

== Later years and death ==
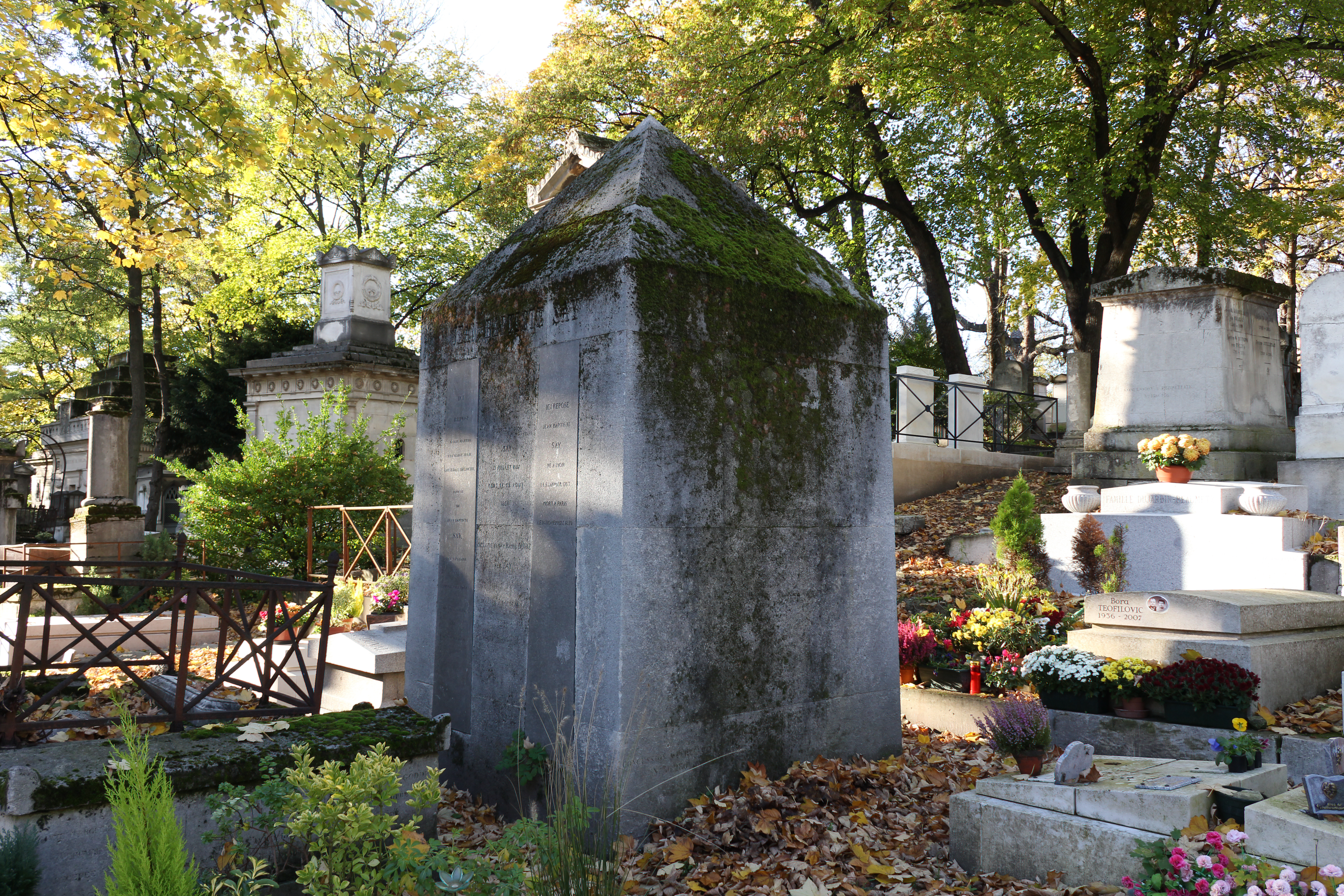
Say's tomb in the Père Lachaise Cemetery in Paris

In his later years, Say became subject to attacks of nervous apoplexy. He lost his wife in January 1830 and from that time his health declined. When the revolution of that year broke out, Say was named a member of the council-general of the department of the Seine, but he found it necessary to resign.

Say died in Paris on 15 November 1832 and was buried in the Père Lachaise Cemetery. Rue Jean-Baptiste Say, a street in the 9th arrondissement of Paris, is named after him.
