= Society of the Friends of the Blacks =

French abolitionist society

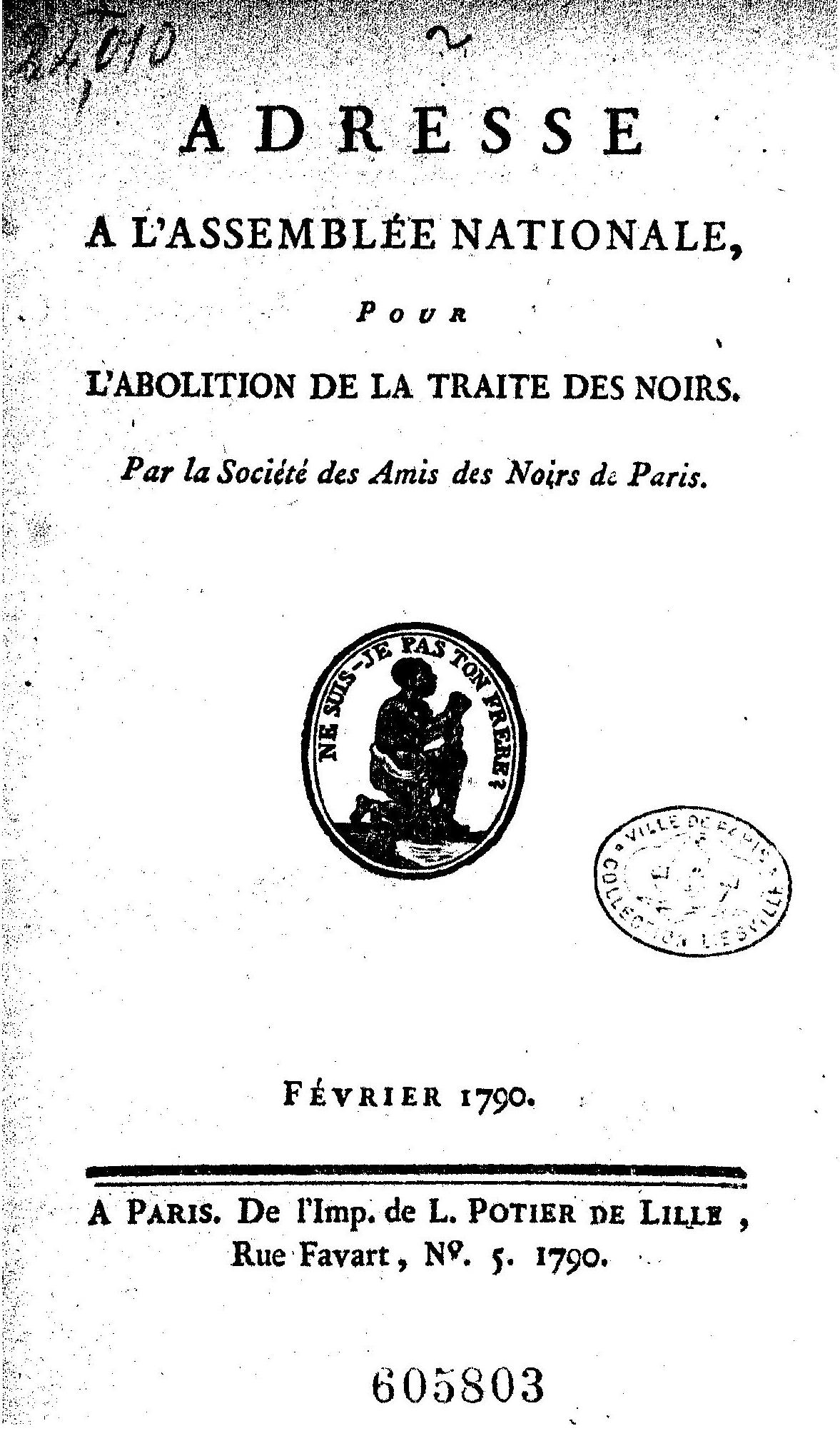
Front page of Address to the National Assembly by the Société des amis des noirs, February 1790

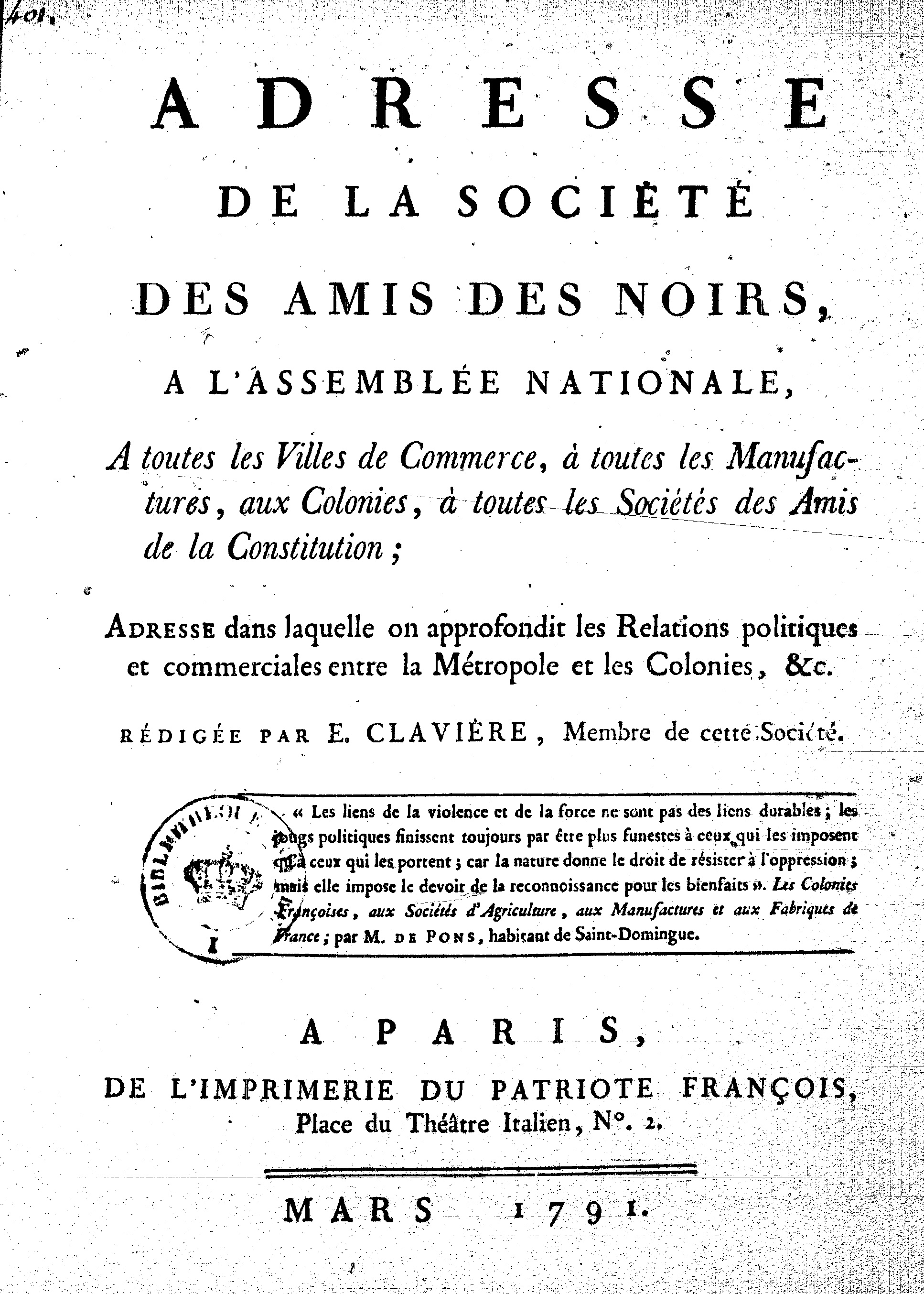
Front page of Société des amis des noirs, March 1791

The Society of the Friends of the Blacks (Société des amis des Noirs or Amis des noirs) was a French abolitionist society founded by Jacques Pierre Brissot and Étienne Clavière and directly inspired by the Society for Effecting the Abolition of the Slave Trade founded in London in 1787. The society's aim was to abolish both the institution of slavery in the France's overseas colonies and French involvement in the Atlantic slave trade.

The society was founded in Paris on 19 February 1788, and remained active until autumn 1791. Clavière was elected as their first president. The secretary Brissot frequently received advice from British abolitionist Thomas Clarkson, who led the abolitionist movement in Great Britain. At the beginning of 1789, the Society had 141 members and held 81 sessions in total. During the three-year period that it remained active, the society published abolitionist literature and frequently addressed its concerns on a substantive political level in the Constituent Assembly. It had ceased being as active for at least a year when the first law to abolish slavery in France and all its colonies and territories came to pass in 1794.

In February 1794, the National Convention passed the Law of 4 February 1794, which effectively abolished slavery and the slave trade and gave the formerly enslaved equal rights. This decision was reversed by Napoleon, who moved to reinstate slavery in the French colonial empire, and unsuccessfully tried to regain control of Saint-Domingue through a massive expedition sent in 1801.

Brissot's archive passed to his son in 1793, and were purchased in 1829 by Francis de Montrol, who used them to edit the Mémoires de Brissot. A part was acquired in 1982 by the National Archives of France, the rest by private collectors. Several articles and monographs have explored the question of how influential the Society was in bringing about the abolition of slavery. Historians disagree about its influence, with some crediting the Amis des Noirs as instrumental in abolition, to others who say the Society was nothing more than a "société de pensée" (philosophical society).

== History ==
The economy of France was dependent upon revenues from the colonies, which were slave societies based largely on production of sugar from cane plantations. The French economy thrived due to the lucrative triangle trade. Demand for sugar was high in Europe. Conditions on the sugar plantations on the islands of Saint-Domingue, Guadeloupe and Martinique, in the Caribbean, were so harsh that slave mortality was very high. This required steady importing of new slaves from Africa. In La Louisiane, in the southern United States, slavery was also the basis of the economy in the New Orleans and Mobile regions. Southern Louisiana had numerous sugar plantations.

Figures indicate that slave-trade activity alone during the years leading up to the French Revolution resulted in some profit percentages exceeding 100 percent. In 1784, for example, the outfitter Chaurands realized a profit of 110 percent through the use of a single ship, the Brune. In 1789, one outfitter reached 120 per cent profit on his voyages. (Note: This is further corroborated by Atlantic slave ship tonnage statistics.)

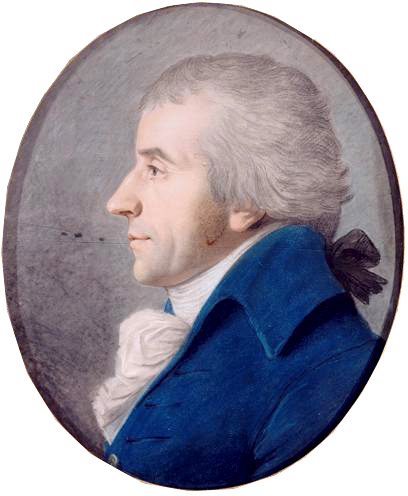
Jacques Pierre Brissot

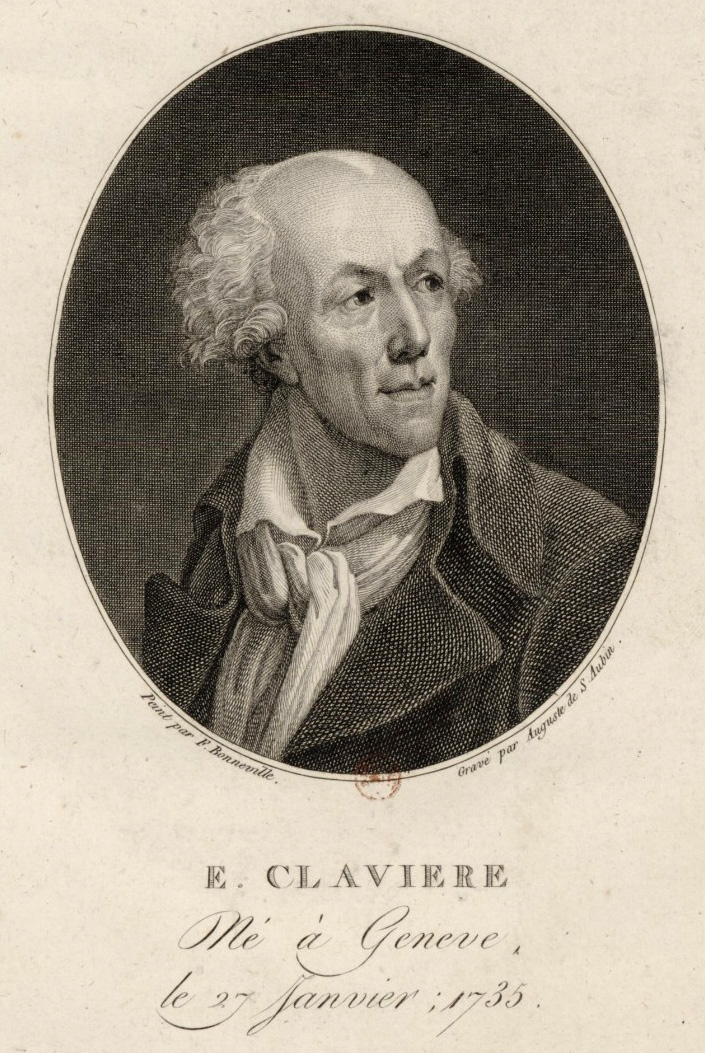
Etienne Claviere

Jacques Pierre Brissot organized the Société des amis des Noirs in February 1788. A follower of the Philosophes, Brissot's anti-slavery efforts were also due to his exposure to humanitarian activities on both sides of the Atlantic. In the United States, where he visited Philadelphia's constitutional convention following the American Revolution, he became absorbed by [Thomas Jefferson]'s humanitarian ideals as expressed in the Declaration of Independence. In Britain, Thomas Clarkson invited Brissot to attend a meeting of the Society for Effecting the Abolition of the Slave Trade. So enthused was Brissot that shortly thereafter he founded an abolitionist society in Paris. Its objectives were to suppress the slave trade and, at a later date, to attain equal rights for free persons of color. This was a class, generally in the French colonies, of persons of mixed French and African ancestry, generally born to French colonial fathers and mothers of African descent (some of whom were also of mixed-race.) The French-born or French Creoles extended them some rights, although not full equality to those of "pure" French descent.

The Amis advocated freedom in the French colonies, arguing that the ideas of the Revolution should extend to the colonies. The French concept of liberté, égalité, fraternité did not include the liberation of slaves, because the National Assembly argued that such abolition would be detrimental to the economy. The Amis des Noirs pushed for the abolition of slavery, although Clarkson recommended they reduce their demands to abolish the Atlantic slave trade (which Great Britain and the United States did in 1808.)

== Activities ==
=== Abolitionist literature ===
Brissot decided at the outset that he would publish written works to influence the public and politicians. and this he did in profusion. The Society published French translations of British abolitionist literature, and also works written by Brissot ("Mémoire sur les Noirs de l'Amerique septentrionale"), written in the midst of the French Revolution. It also published work by other members of the Amis des Noirs, such as Étienne Clavière ("De la France et des États-Unis" – co-written with Brissot) and Condorcet ("Réflexions sur l'esclavage des nėgres"). Members gave lectures to other societies as well, such as the Amis de l'humanité, and the Société des Amis de la Constitution. It was a reflection of not only the "Philosophe upbringing" of the Society members, but also of their efforts to be active participants in the moulding of the revolutionary government.

La Société des Amis des Noirs was most active distributing its anti-slavery literature in and around Paris, due to the lack of a stable and reliable communications network, particularly as the French Revolution proceeded. The Society did make attempts to convey its message to those living outside Paris. For instance, in 1791, the society gained assistance from its Jacobin friends: "The Friends of the Blacks had several meetings with their friends in Jacobin clubs in provincial cities and sent to every city government a lengthy pamphlet exposing the injustices done to people of color."

=== Political activities ===
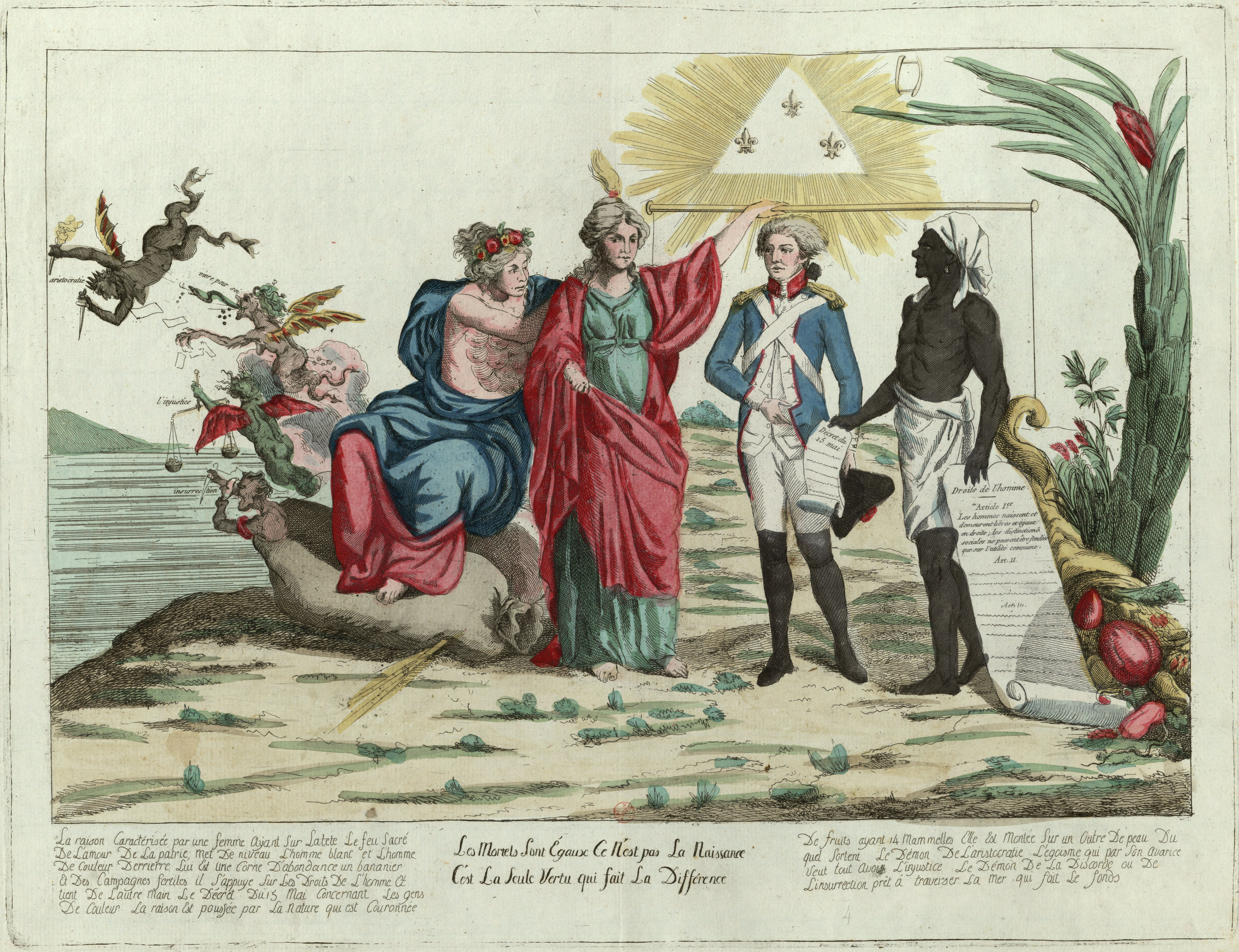
"Mortals are equal, it is not birth, but virtue alone that makes the difference".

The political activities of the Friends of the Blacks included addresses to the National Assembly, for instance, speeches promoting the abolition of the slave trade were made in February and April 1790. Another address was delivered a few months later. Four months later, a discourse was presented concerning the violence in Saint Domingue, which had broken out in a struggle for rights by free people of color and slaves. In July 1791, Clavière addressed the National Assembly's commercial interests, discussing trade relations between France and its colonies.

The Society also directly appealed to government individuals such as Antoine Barnave, a member of the Committee on Colonies, and Jacques Necker, France's Controller-General of Finance. Although Necker acknowledged that slavery was inhumane, he would not sanction emancipation in French colonies unless the practice of slavery and the slave trade were halted simultaneously in every country. He believed that this was needed to maintain the existing economic balance among nations. In a 1789 letter, the Society urged Necker to form a committee similar to the one in Britain, and expressed hopes that debates over slavery in the British Parliament might have a positive effect on abolitionist sentiment in the Estates-General. Other Society addresses denounced individuals in the colonies. One such incident occurred in 1791, when the Amis des Noirs responded to criticism written by pro-slaver Arthur Dillon, Député de la Martinique, and owner of a large plantation.

In 1789, the royal government had requested petitions of grievances from all parts of the country. During the election of representatives to the Estates-General, Condorcet asked for a demand for abolition of the slave trade to be included in these cahiers de doléances. Out of the 600 cahiers assembled, fewer than 50 called for an end to the slave trade and slavery.

Society member Abbé Grégoire recommended in the fall of 1789 that two deputies to the Assembly be chosen from the population of free people of color. This was accepted by the Committee on Verification of Credentials in the National Assembly. Gregoire's was unable to present his proposal to the National Assembly because every time he rose to speak, he was shouted down by the colonists (usually planters) in the Assembly. In March 1790, Grégoire questioned the article on voting rights in the National Assembly, urging that free men of colour be given the franchise. The colonial deputies persuaded the National Assembly to close discussion of the matter. During that same month Barnave, a pro-slavery advocate, delivered his report on maintaining the slave trade. When Mirabeau, a member of the Society, advanced to the rostrum to protest, he was drowned out by cries of the opposition.

Focusing on the rights of free men of colour, abbé Grégoire and Jerome Pétion warned the Assembly on 15 May 1791 that if these people were not given their rights, violence would ensue in the colonies. Because of the increasing conflict in the colonies, as well as the growing influence of free men of colour with some deputies, Barnave felt that the members of the Society could not be ignored: "We can't win against the influence of the Friends of the Blacks."

On 15 May the Assembly decreed that all men of colour would be granted equal rights if they were born of free parents. Further legislation passed on 4 April 1792 (with influence from La Société des Amis des Noirs), stated that every free man of colour now enjoyed equal rights.

== Opposition from pro-slavery groups ==
=== The Committee on Colonies ===
The Committee on Colonies was formed in March 1790 to deal with escalating problems arising from slavery unrest in the colonies. Its resolution of the problem leaned heavily in favour of the colonists, and its membership generally had little sympathy for conditions of slaves. The members of the committee included colonial landowners (who were usually slaveholders), other slave owners, lawyers and merchants, and all were advocates of French commercial interests. The final report of the Committee did not alleviate any of the problems relating to slavery. It stressed that it did not wish to interfere in the commercial interests of the colonies: "The National Assembly declares that it had not intended to innovate in any branch of commerce direct or indirect of France with its colonies..."

A group of National Assembly deputies who were either colonists or slave trade merchants lobbied the French chambers of commerce and city governments to maintain the slave trade and slavery, proclaiming that economic disaster would result from its abolition. The deputies argued their point so effectively that members of La Société des Amis des Noirs feared abolition would cause chaos. One such pro-slavery group was composed of the lobbyists for the French chambers of commerce, who designated themselves as the "Deputies Extraordinary of Manufactures and Commerce." Their main efforts focused on influencing the Committee on Agriculture and Commerce to maintain slavery and the slave trade. Since revenue from the colonies was collected mainly from the sale of slaves and crops, the committee was investigating the economic ramifications should this source of income cease to exist. Historian Quinney wrote in 1970 that Barnave's non-committal report to the National Assembly resulted from him learning that the Committee on Agriculture and Commerce "had already decided to advise the National Assembly to retain the trade and slavery."

=== Massiac Club ===
A pro-slavery organization called the Massiac Club, headquartered in Paris, was composed of colonial planters living in Paris and throughout France. The club had its main headquarters in Paris, with chapters located in the provinces. Realizing that success was related to political influence, the club proceeded to systematically contact government officials. (Note: "Le club, en fait, forme avant tout un lobby. Il n'a pas de représentant en tant que tel B l'Assemblée nationale mais joue sur l'influence de certains élus, en tLte desquels l'avocat grenoblais Barnave, membre des Jacobins." Biondi, J.P. – Zuccarelli, F. 16 Pluviose An II, p. 42)

The Massiac members opposed any type of abolition legislation, and communicated with each colonial deputy to ensure that pro-slavery interests were maintained. Mirabeau stated that when he attempted to sway the deputies in favour of abolition, every official he spoke to had already been approached by a member of the Massiac club. The Massiac group published and distributed literature, responding in toto to practically every idea the Amis des Noirs had put forward.

In a leaflet distributed to members of the Comité de Commerce de l'Assemblée Nationale, the Massiac accused the Amis des Noirs of being involved in subversive activity. The Massiac Club published a handbill that said the abolitionists were not truly humanitarian philanthropists, but rather an organization attempting to subvert social order. They claimed the Amis des Noirs should be viewed as counter-revolutionaries, and pro-British. The pro-slavers also distributed leaflets specifically denouncing individuals: Brissot, Grégoire and Pétion. They supported the slave trade in debates held in district assemblies within Paris, and attempted to influence voting in these districts when the question of the slave trade was introduced.

== Criticisms ==
=== Organisational failings ===
Historians have concluded that the Society was virtually impotent due to its organization, strategy, and membership criteria. In terms of organization, Quinney refers to the group's ineffective operations, stating that the government, which contained pro-slavery elements, had a nationwide propaganda network, while the Society was mainly Paris-based. Resnick concurs when he states: "Both leadership and membership at large were drawn heavily from the Paris area, with no established network of regional filiations."

In addition, they held meetings irregularly, without full membership present. Even in 1789, Thomas Clarkson commented upon the poor attendance at the meetings. The lack of organization and continuity was shown by the departure of Brissot in June 1789 for the United States to meet abolitionists, although he had organized the Society's first meeting in February 1789. He did not become active in the Society until the spring of 1790, when he again became the Society's president. The Society required presidents to serve only three months; they shared responsibility, but the short tenure hindered continuity of effort within the organization. The Society decided that a "General Assembly" would be elected from within. This body would not only represent the Society and make the rules, but would also hold exclusive voting rights in the election of the officials.Hence, from the organization's inception, rank and file membership were excluded from participating in the Society's operations.

=== Elitist membership policies ===
Analysis of the membership list of the Society reveals a predominance of elite individuals. Although they possessed great influence, they had most of their power in Paris. There was a lack of popular participation, which reflected the structure of government and society. The founding members of the Society included such notables as Brissot, Condorcet, Lafayette, Louis Alexandre of La Rochefoucauld (1743–1792) 6th Duke of La Rochefoucauld, and Clavière. The Society began with a handful of abolitionists, increased to ninety-five by 1789, and would swell to a maximum of 141 associates in later years.

Of the 141 members, twenty-five percent were government employees, twenty-nine percent were nobility, and thirty-eight were professionals; the total of elitist membership made up 92% of all members. (Note: There are two sources used to identify the names of the members: (i) Brissot, Jacques-Pierre (1789). Tableau des Membres de la Société des Amis des Noirs. Paris. pp. 1–8 and (ii) Perroud (January–December 1916). "La Société française des Amis des Noirs". La Révolution française. 69: 144. In the latter, members are listed at the end of the article.) Cohen observed: "It [the Society] ... concentrated on having important, well-connected members, rather than large members ... The members [were] drawn from the French social elite ..."

The Society restricted members to those who could pay dues and be recommended by four other men. There were different fee scales: two Louis per year for those who lived in Paris, and 24 livres per year for those living in the provinces. The membership practices of La Société des Amis des Noirs both hampered its attempt at increasing in size, and affected its ability to become a credible and effective entity.

=== Relationship to British abolitionists ===
Perroud states that Brissot's trip to London in November 1787 prompted him to form a similar abolitionist group in France. The British society had been formed only a few months earlier, in May 1787. A group of abolitionists in Paris discussed how the London society encouraged others to join its cause, and noted that France and Britain had a commonality with respect to abolishing slavery.

The Society translated and published British anti-slavery literature. Brissot, shortly after founding the Society, wrote to Quaker James Philips, an original member of the British abolitionist society. Brissot stated his intention for the Amis des Noirs to translate and publish British anti-slavery works for distribution to the French public.

Many French citizens believed that the Society was an offshoot of the British abolitionist movement, and some suspected the British were paying them to promote their cause. This resulted in a loss of credibility in the eyes of the French public. Britain and France had historically been antagonistic towards each other for decades. Britain had defeated France in the Seven Years' War and taken over much of its territory in North America. Influences from Britain were seen as "dealing with the enemy." This view extended to encompass the activities of the Society. The perception that it was a vehicle for British infiltration into French matters overshadowed its intentions.

== Outcome ==
The Society was rendered inactive by the outbreak of the Haitian Revolution, begun as a slave rebellion, as well as by the major crisis of the French First Republic (with the start of the French Revolutionary Wars). It remained active until 1793, publishing its calls in papers such as Patriote français, L'Analyse des papiers anglais, Le Courrier de Provence, and La chronique de Paris.

On 4 February 1794 (16 Pluviôse an II), approximately a year after the demise of the Amis des Noirs, the National Convention passed the Emancipation Declaration, abolishing slavery:

La Convention Nationale déclare que l'Esclavage des Nègres dans toutes les Colonies est aboli: en conséquence elle décrete que tous les hommes, sans distinction de couleur, domiciliés dans les colonies, sont Citoyens Français, et jouiront de tous les droits assurés par la Constitution. Elle renvoie au comité de salut public, pour lui faire incessamment un rapport sur les mesures à prendre pour assurer l'exécution du présent décret. [The National Convention declares that slavery of Negroes in all the Colonies is abolished; consequently it decrees that all men, without distinction of color, domiciled in the colonies are French citizens, and shall enjoy all the rights guaranteed by the Constitution. The public safety committee was charged with regularly reporting on measures taken to ensure implementation of this Decree].

== Notable members ==
Liste des membres de la Société des Amis des Noirs till 11 June 1790.

- Jacques Pierre Brissot
- Jean-Louis Carra
- Thomas Clarkson
- Étienne Clavière
- J. Hector St. John de Crèvecœur
- Marquis de Condorcet
- Henri Grégoire
- brothers Lameth
- François-Xavier Lanthenas
- Étienne Charles de Loménie de Brienne
- Jean-Baptiste-Joseph de Lubersac
- Samuel de Missy
- Marquis de La Fayette
- Claude-Emmanuel de Pastoret
- Jérôme Pétion de Villeneuve
- Julien Raimond
- Louis Alexandre of La Rochefoucauld
- William Short (American ambassador)
- Constantin François de Chassebœuf, comte de Volney

It is unlikely Robespierre joined the society between June 1790 and September 1791. He quarreled with Pétion, the Lameths and Brissot in 1792 and they became his enemies. He sent Brissot to the scaffold in November 1793; Saint-George was imprisoned in December 1793. De Gouges was executed and Clavière, de Loménie, Condorcet and Pétion all committed suicide.

== See also ==
- Society for Effecting the Abolition of the Slave Trade

== Bibliography ==
=== References (primary) ===
- The following list of letters, addresses, and minutes were obtained from a collection of pamphlets entitled La Révolution française et l'abolition de l'esclavage [The French Revolution and the Abolition of Slavery] (12 vols.). Paris: Editions d'histoire sociale. 10, rue Vivienne. Retrieved 21 January 2025. LCCN 73-407279; OCLC 1864783 (all editions).
1. Vol. 1. 1770 – via Gallica: bpt6k9325n.
2. Vol. 2. 1770 – via Gallica: bpt6k9326z.
3. Vol. 3. 1770 – via Gallica: bpt6k93278.
4. Vol. 4. 1770 – via Gallica: bpt6k9328k.
5. Vol. 5. 1770 – via Gallica: bpt6k9329w.
6. Vol. 6. 1788 – via Gallica: bpt6k9330c.
7. Vol. 7. 1788 – via Gallica: bpt6k9331p.
8. Vol. 8. 1788 – via Gallica: bpt6k93320.
9. Vol. 9. 1788 – via Gallica: bd6t5405036g.
10. Vol. 10. 1788 – via Gallica: bpt6k9334m.
11. Vol. 11. 1788 – via Gallica: bpt6k9335x.
12. Vol. 12. 1791 – via Gallica: bpt6k93367.
- Brissot, Jacques-Pierre (1754–1793) (20 December 1789). Mémoire sur les Noirs de l'Amérique septentrionale, lu à l'Assemblée de la Société des Amis des Noirs, le 9 février 1789 [Memoir on the Blacks of North America, read at the Assembly of the Society of the Friends of the Blacks, on 9 February 1789]. Paris: Bureau du Patriote – via Gallica: bpt6k480988.
- Pétion, Jérôme (1756–1794), of Villeneuve; Brissot, Jacques-Pierre (1754–1793), of Warville (9 April 1790). Seconde Adresse à l'Assemblée nationale, par la Société des Amis des Noirs, établie à Paris [Second Address to the National Assembly, by the Society of Friends of the Blacks, established in Paris]. Paris: Imprimerie du Patriote François – via Gallica: bpt6k5790236g.
- Brissot, Jacques-Pierre (1754–1793) (1791). Discours sur la nécessité de maintenir le décret rendu le 15 mai en faveur des hommes de couleur libres, prononcé le 12 septembre 1791, à la séance de la Société des Amis de la Constitution [Discourse on the Necessity of Maintaining the Decree Issued on 15 May in Favor of Free Men of Color, Delivered on 12 September 1791, at the Session of the Society of Friends of the Constitution]. Paris (UB): Imprimé par ordre de la Société.
- Clarkson, Thomas (1760–1846) (1808). History of the Rise, Progress and Abolition of the African Slave Trade by the British Parliament (3 Vols.). London. pp. 381–404. Retrieved 21 January 2025.
1. (%5b%5bOxford University|Oxford%5d%5d) Vol. 1. 1808.
2. (%5b%5bHarvard%5d%5d) Vol. 2. 1836.
3. Vol. 3. The Cabinet of freedom. Published by John S. Taylor. 1836 – via HathiTrust (NYPL).
- Clavière, Étienne (1735–1793) (March 1791). Adresse de la Société des Amis des Noirs, à l'Assemblée nationale, à toutes les villes de commerce, à toutes les manufactures, aux colonies, à toutes les sociétés des Amis de la Constitution ; adresse dans laquelle on approfondit les relations politiques et commerciales entre la métropole et les colonies, &c [Address From the Society of the Friends of the Blacks, to the National Assembly, to All Commercial Cities, to All Manufacturers, to the Colonies, and to All Societies of the Friends of the Constitution: An Address in Which the Political and Commercial Relations Between the Metropole and the Colonies Are Examined in Depth, Etc]. Paris: De l'Imprimerie du Patriote français – via Gallica bpt6k44847m. LCCN 87-880302, LCCN 47-37928, LCCN 65-58696 (2nd ed.); OCLC 65353839 (all editions).
- Condorcet, Marie Jean Antoine Nicolas de (1743–1794), Marquis de Condorcet (1788). Réflexions sur l'esclavage des negres [Reflections on the Slavery of Black People]. Par M. Swartz [Condorcet's pseudonym], Pasteur du Saint Evangile a Bienne, Membre de la Société économique Nouvelle édition revue & corrigée. Neufchatel et Paris: Froullé.
- Wadström, Charles-Bern[h]ard (1746–1799) [in French] (1796). Additions aux réglemens de la Société des Amis des Noirs et des Colonies [Additions to the Regulations of the Society of the Friends of the Blacks and the Colonies]. An II (French Republican calendar § Converting from the Gregorian Calendar) (French Republican Calendar) → 22 September 1793 – 21 September 1794 (Gregorian Calendar). In Vol. 8 of La Révolution française et l'abolition de l'esclavage. Paris – via Gallica.
Français: Additions aux règlements de la Société des Amis des Noirs et des Colonies.
« La réunion des Amis des Noirs et des Colonies ayant remis au citoyen Wadström une esquisse des règlements d'après lesquels doivent se diriger les opérations futures de la Société, en l'invitant à y faire les additions qu'il jugerait nécessaires, il remet aujourd'hui son travail et demande qu'on le soumette à la discussion. »
English: Additions to the Regulations of the Society of the Friends of the Blacks and the Colonies.
"The meeting of the Friends of the Blacks and the Colonies having entrusted citizen Wadström with a draft of the regulations according to which the future operations of the Society should be conducted, and having invited him to make any additions he deemed necessary, he now submits his work and requests that it be put to discussion".
Français: XI: « Le zèle des femmes pour tout ce qui concerne l'humanité, l'intérêt qu'elles ont en général montré pour l'abolition de la traite des Noirs, et leur influence sur l'autre sexe, demandent qu'elles soient admises aux séances. »
English: "The zeal of women for all matters concerning humanity, the interest they have generally shown in the abolition of the slave trade, and their influence over men call for their admission to the sessions."
- La Société des Amis des Noirs (1788). Discours sur la nécessité d'établir a Paris une Société pour concourir, avec celle de Londres, a l'abolition de la traite & de l'esclavage des Negres. Prononcé le 19 Février 1788, dans une Société de quelques amis, rassemblés a Paris, à la priere du Comité de Londres. Paris.
- La Société des Amis des Noirs (1789a). Reglemens de la Société des Amis des Noirs. Paris.
- La Société des Amis des Noirs (1789b). Tableau des Membres de la Société des Amis des Noirs. Année 1789. Paris.
- La Société des Amis des Noirs (1789c). Lettre de la Société des Amis des Noirs, B. M. Necker, avec le Résponse de ce Ministre. Paris.
- La Société des Amis des Noirs (1790a). Addresse a l'Assemblée Nationale, pour l'abolition de la Traite des noirs Par le Société des Amis des Noirs de Paris. Paris: Imprimerie de Potier de Lille.
- La Société des Amis des Noirs (1790b). Addresse aux Amis de l'humanité, par la Société des amis des Noirs, sur le plan de ses travaux Lue au Comité, le 4 juin 1790, et imprimée par son ordre. Paris: Imprimerie du Patriote François.
- La Société des Amis des Noirs (1790c). Reflexions sur le Code Noir, et Dénonciation d'un crime affreux, commis a Saint-Dominigue; addressés a l'Assemblée Nationale par la Société des Amis des Noirs. Paris: Imprimerie du Patriote François.
- La Société des Amis des Noirs (1794). Decret de la Convention Nationale, du 16. jour de Pluviôse, an second de la République Française, une & indivisible, Qui abolit l'esclavage des Negres dans les Colonies. Paris.

=== References (secondary) ===
- Baker, K. (1975). Condorcet. Chicago: The University of Chicago Press. ISBN 9780226035321.
- Benot, Y. (1988). La révolution française et la fin des colonies. Paris: Éditions La Découverte.
- Blackburn, R. (1988). The Overthrow of Colonial Slavery 1776–1848. London: Verso.
- Biondi, J. P. (1989). Zuccarelli, F. 16 Pluviose An II. Paris: Éditions Denoel.
- Woodson, Carter Godwin (1875–1950) (ed.). Journal of Negro History. Lancaster and Washington, D.C.: The Association for the Study of Negro Life and History. Retrieved 21 February 2010. LCCN 17-5861, LCCN 70-102634, LCCN sn99-23392, LCCN 2006-236700; ISSN 2325-6842, ISSN 0022-2992, ISSN 1548-1867; OCLC 60628423 (all editions) (journal), OCLC 1782257 (all editions) (journal).
1. Brown, George William (1900–1978) [at Wikidata] (October 1922). ""The Origins of Abolition in Santo Domingo"" . The Journal of Negro History. 7 (4): 365–376. doi:10.2307/2713719. JSTOR 2713719. S2CID 149463250. doi:10.2307/2713600; OCLC 5545488421, 7254809526 (article).
2. Brown, George William (1900–1978) [at Wikidata] (April 1923). ""Haiti and the United States"". The Journal of Negro History. 8 (2): 134–152. doi:10.2307/2713602. JSTOR 2713602 &
  - N° 44343 at Project Gutenberg; OCLC 5545495338, 7254811079
A historical survey of the policy of the United States in regard to Haiti and San Domingo.
3. McCloy, Shelby Thomas (July 1945). ""Negroes and Mulattoes in Eighteenth-Century France"". The Journal of Negro History. 30 (3): 276–292. doi:10.2307/2715112. JSTOR 2715112. S2CID 150264017.
4. McCloy, Shelby Thomas (October 1954). ""Further Notes on Negroes and Mulattoes in Eighteenth-Century France"". The Journal of Negro History. 39 (4): 284–297. doi:10.2307/2715402. JSTOR 2715402. S2CID 150108576 – via UChicago.
5. Quinney, Valerie (April 1970). ""Decisions on Slavery, the Slave Trade, and Civil Rights for Negroes in the Early French Revolution"". The Journal of Negro History. 55 (2): 117–130. doi:10.2307/2716445. JSTOR 2716445. S2CID 149715580 – via UChicago.
- Cahen, Léon Samuel (1874–1944) [at Wikidata] (January–June 1906). "La Société des Amis des Noirs et Condorcet" [The Society of the Friends of the Blacks and Nicolas de Condorcet]. La Révolution française: revue d'histoire moderne et contemporaine publiée par la Société de l'histoire de la Révolution (The French Revolution: Journal of Modern and Contemporary History, Published by the Society for the History of the Revolution). 50: 481–511 – via Gallica bpt6k116262h. LCCN 09-4038; ISSN 2025-0290; OCLC 4214810 (all editions), OCLC 508765989 (all editions).
- Cochin, A. (1979). L'Abolition de L'Esclavage. Fort-de-France. Editions Emile Désormeaux.
- Cohen, W. B. (1980). The French Encounter with Africans. Bloomington, Indiana: Indiana University Press.
- Cooper, A. (1988). Slavery and the French Revolutionists (1788–1805). Lewiston, New York: The Edwin Mellen Press.
- Davis, D. (1969). The Problem of Slavery in Western Culture. Ithaca: Cornell University Press.
- Despin, J. (1977). "Montesquieu était-il esclavagiste?". La Pensée. 193: 102–112.
- Ellery, E. (1970). Brissot de Warville. New York: Burt Franklin.
- Foubert, B. (1974). "Colons et esclaves du sud de Saint-Domingue au début de la Révolution". Revue Française d'Histoire d'Outre-Mer. 61 (223): 199–217. doi:10.3406/outre.1974.1755.
- Gainot, Bernard; Dorigny, Marcel (1998). La Société des amis des noirs, 1788–1799. Contribution à l'histoire de l'abolition de l'esclavage. Collection Mémoire des peuples, Paris, Éditions UNESCO/EDICEF. ISBN 978-92-3-203306-2. (this book contains protocols of the society and can only ordered from UNESCO; content in French)
- Garrett, M. (1916). The French Colonial Question 1789–1791. Ann Arbor, Michigan: George Wahr.
- Gaston-Martin (1948). Histoire de L'Esclavage dans les Colonies Françaises. Paris: Presses Universitaires de France.
- Geggus, D. (1989). "Racial Equality, Slavery, and Colonial Secession during the Constituent Assembly". American Historical Review. 94 (5): 1290–1308. doi:10.2307/1906352. JSTOR 1906352.
- Hazard, Samuel (1834–1876) (1873). Santo Domingo, Past and Present: With a Glance at Hayti. New York: Harper and Brothers. p. 116 – via Internet Archive (Library of Congress). LCCN 20-12417, LCCN 20-12418; OCLC 3817507 (all editions).
- Hunting, C. (1978). "The Philosophes and the Question of Black Slavery 1748–1765". Journal of the History of Ideas. 39 (3): 405–418. doi:10.2307/2709385. JSTOR 2709385.
- Ingram, John Kells (1911). "Slavery" . In Chisholm, Hugh (ed.). Encyclopædia Britannica. Vol. 25 (11th ed.). Cambridge University Press. pp. 216–227.
- Jameson, R. (1911). Montesquieu et L'Esclavage. Paris: Librairie Hachette.
- Jennings, L. (1991). The Interaction of French and British Antislavery, 1789–1848. Unpublished article.
- Krebs, A. (1956–57). "La Fayette et le Probleme de L'Esclavage". Annuaire-Bulletin de la Société de l'Histoire de France: 49–60.
- Lafontant, J. (1979). Montesquieu et le Probleme de L'Esclavage dans L'Esprit des Lois. Sherbrooke, Québec: Editions Naaman.
- Lokke, C. (1968). France and the Colonial Question. New York: AMS Press.
- McCloy, S. (1961). The Negro in France. Kentucky: University of Kentucky.
- McCloy, S. (1972). The Humanitarian Movement in Eighteenth-Century France. New York: Haskell House Publishers.
- Métral, A. (1985). Histoire de L'Expédition des Français a Saint-Domingue. Paris, Editions Karthala.
- Montrol, François Mongin de (1799–1862) [in French], ed. (1830–1832). Mémoires de Brissot, membre de l'Assemblée législative et de la Convention nationale, sur ses contemporains et la Révolution française. Publiés par son fils ; avec des notes et des éclaircissemens historiques [Memoirs of Brissot, Member of the Legislative Assembly and the National Convention, on His Contemporaries and the French Revolution. Published by His Son, with Notes and Historical Clarifications]. Mémoires relatifs à la révolution française. Paris: Ladvocat, libraire (Pierre-François Ladvocat, known as Camille Ladvocat; 1791–1854) – via HathiTrust. Retrieved 12 June 2023. LCCN 15-14167; OCLC 3125459 (all editions).
1. (%5b%5bGhent University|Ghent%5d%5d) Vol. 1. 1830.
2. (%5b%5bUniversity of Zurich|Zurich%5d%5d) Vol. 2. 1830.
3. (%5b%5bAustrian National Library%5d%5d) Vol. 3. 1832.
4. (%5b%5bJesuit collection of Fontaines%5d%5d [%5b%5b:fr:Collection jésuite des Fontaines|fr%5d%5d]) Vol. 4. 1832.
- Necheles, R. (1971). The Abbé Grégoire 1787–1831. Westport, Conn.: Greenwood Publishing Corp.
- Perroud, Claude (1839–1919) [in French] (January–December 1916). "La Société française des Amis des Noirs" [The French Society of the Friends of the Blacks]. La Révolution française: revue d'histoire moderne et contemporaine publiée par la Société de l'histoire de la Révolution (The French Revolution: Journal of Modern and Contemporary History, Published by the Society for the History of the Revolution). 69. Aulard, François Victor Alphonse (1849-1928), directeur-rédacteur en chef. Paris: Au siège de la société, 3, rue de Furstenberg: 122–147 – via Gallica bpt6k1162402. LCCN 09-4038; ISSN 2025-0290; OCLC 4214810 (all editions), OCLC 508765989 (all editions).
- Quinney, Valerie (Autumn 1972). "The Problem of Civil Rights for Free Men of Color in the Early French Revolution". French Historical Studies. 55 (4): 544–557. doi:10.2307/286197. JSTOR 286197. OCLC 5548682378, 7374784597 (article).
- "Registre de la Société des Amis des Noirs (1788–1790)" [Register of the Society of Friends of the Blacks (1788–1790)] (in French) – via University of Caen Normandy (MRSH).
Source: Brissot, Jacques-Pierre (1789). Tableau des Membres de la Société des Amis des Noirs. Paris. pp. 1–8 (British Library).
- Resnick, Daniel P. (1972). "The Société des Amis des Noirs and the Abolition of Slavery". French Historical Studies. 7 (4): 558–569. doi:10.2307/286198. JSTOR 286198.
- Seeber, E. D. (1937). Anti-Slavery Opinion in France During the Second Half of the Eighteenth Century. Baltimore: Johns Hopkins Press.
- La société des Amis des Noirs; Brissot, Jacques Pierre (1754–1793), Interim President; Clavière, Étienne (1735–1793), Secretary (10 March 1871). La société des Amis des Noirs à Arthur Dillon, député de la Martinique à l'Assemblée nationale [The Society of the Friends of the Blacks to Arthur Dillon, Deputy of Martinique at the National Assembly] (in French) – via Internet Archive (Brown University). OCLC 1405279496 (all editions)
See Arthur Dillon (1750–1794).
- Spieler, Miranda Frances, PhD (April 2009). "The Legal Structure of Colonial Rule During the French Revolution". William and Mary Quarterly. Third series. 66 (2): 365–408. JSTOR 40212057. JSTOR 40212057; ISSN 0043-5597 (journal; print), ISSN 1933-7698 (journal; web); OCLC 9964330738 (article).
- Stein, Robert Louis, PhD (December 1975). "The Profitability of the Nantes Slave Trade". Journal of Economic History. 35 (3): 779–793. doi:10.1017/S0022050700073769. JSTOR 2119184. S2CID 153739097.
- Stein, Robert Louis, PhD (1979). The French Slave Trade in the Eighteenth Century. Madison: The University of Wisconsin Press. ISBN 978-0-2990-7910-9, 0-2990-7910-4; OCLC 5286555 (all editions).
- Stein, Robert Louis, PhD (May 1981). "The Free Men of Colour and the Revolution in Saint Domingue, 1789–1792". Histoire Sociale / Social History. 14 (27): 7–28. ISSN 0018-2257. OCLC 122447550 – via York University.
- Stein, Robert Louis, PhD (1985). Léger Félicité Sonthonax: The Lost Sentinel of the Republic. London: Associated University Press. (see Léger Félicité Sonthonax) ISBN 978-0-8386-3218-5, 0-8386-3218-1; OCLC 11757317 (all editions).
- Stoddard, T. (1970). The French Revolution in San Domingo. Westport, CT: Negro Universities Press.
- Tarrade, J. (1989). "Les colonies et les Principes de 1789: Les Assemblées Révolutionnaire face au Probléme de L'Esclavage". Revue Française d'Histoire d'Outre-Mer. 76: 9–34. doi:10.3406/outre.1989.2729.
- Vidalenc, J. (1957). "Les traite des negres en France au début de la Révolution (1789–1793)". Annales Historiques de la Révolution Française. 146: 56–69.
- Thibau, J. (1989). Le Temps de Saint-Domingue. Saint-Armand-Montrond, France: Editions Jean-Claude Lattes.
- Tulard, Jean; Fayard, Jean-François; Fierro, Alfred (1998). Histoire et dictionnaire de la Révolution française 1789–1799. Éditions Robert Laffont. ISBN 9782221088500.
- Viles, P. (1972). "The Slaving Interest in the Atlantic Ports, 1763–1792". French Historical Studies. 7 (4): 529–543. doi:10.2307/286196. JSTOR 286196.
- Whitman, D. (1977). "Slavery and the Rights of Frenchmen: Views of Montesquieu, Rousseau and Raynal". French Colonial Studies. 1: 17–33.
