= Say's Political Economy =

Traité d'économie politique, 1803.

A Treatise on Political Economy; or The Production, Distribution, and Consumption of Wealth (in English), known as Traité d'économie politique in French, is an industrial economics book written by Jean-Baptiste Say.

The first edition of Political Economy was published in 1803. The fifth edition, published in 1826, was the final one within Say's lifetime. The sixth edition, published in 1846, with Say's final corrections, was edited by Say's eldest son, Horace Émile Say, an economist himself.

Political Economy was translated into English "from the 4th edition of the French" by C. R. Prinsep (1821), into German by Ludwig Heinrich von Jakob (1807) and by C. Ed. Morstadt (1818 and 1830), and, according to Say, into Spanish by José Queypo.

In 1804, due to his opposition to Napoleon Bonaparte, Say left employment with the government of France. He then turned to studying industrial pursuits, specifically cotton milling in Auchy, The plant was a spinning-mill with 400 to 500 employees, principally women and children.

Say spent his time revising Political Economy. The volume had gone out print and the French government had denied him permission to reprint it. When the allied powers deposed the Napoleonic regime in 1814, Say published the second edition of Political Economy. He dedicated it to Tsar Alexander I of Russia, who had claimed to be Say's pupil.

In 1814, the new French government sent Say to Great Britain to study its economic conditions. The results of his observations during his journey through England and Scotland appeared in a tract, De l'Angleterre et des Anglais. Say's research on this trip led him to refine his principles in the third edition of Political Economy, published in 1817.

Between 1828 and 1830, Say published his Cours complet d'économie politique pratique, which was an expansion of Political Economy to practical applications.
