= Mirabeau atelier =

The Mirabeau atelier was an advocacy group in pre-revolutionary France for the thought of Honoré Gabriel Riqueti, comte de Mirabeau, consisting of sympathetic thinkers and writers. Israel called it Mirabeau's "high-powered anti-aristocratic crypto-republican French-Swiss propaganda machine". The atelier played a significant role in August 1789 in drafting the Declaration of the Rights of Man and of the Citizen.

== Courrier de Provence ==
This newspaper for Mirabeau's views was initially (10 May to 25 July 1789) issued under the title Lettres du comte Mirabeau à ses commettants. It followed Les États généraux that had been suppressed after two issues. The sequel Courrier de Provence ran to 1791, and Étienne Dumont and Jacques Antoine Du Roveray were on the editorial staff. Dumont and Du Roveray, both Genevan exiles, were Bowood circle members who travelled to Paris from London in March 1789. Dumont later wrote of the Genevan atelier as comprising also Étienne Clavière and the pastor Étienne-Solomon Reybaz.

Arthur McCandless Wilson in reviewing L'Atelier de Mirabeau (1962) by Jean Bénétruy, about the Genevan group, describes a division of labour: Clavière on finance; Du Roveray liaison with abolitionists of the Société des amis des Noirs; Dumont and Reybaz with facility for publicity and speechwriting. They were joined on the Courrier by the economist Jean-Baptiste Say.

== Speech writers and authors of position papers ==
Based on research of François Victor Alphonse Aulard, Mirabeau was supported, besides the Genevans, by Alexandre Cazeau de Roumillac (the soi-disant Marquis de Caseau), Jean-Joachim Pellenc and Antoine-Adrien Lamourette.

The original and covert use by Mirabeau of the Genevan group evolved after the storming of the Bastille. A disillusioned Dumont returned to London in early 1790. In correspondence with Samuel Romilly, he revealed the technique of "faiseurs" operating in mutual ignorance employed by Mirabeau in a cell-like system, for drafting. The overt entourage of Mirabeau also contributed, notably Pierre Jean Georges Cabanis, alongside the allies Dominique Joseph Garat and the Comte de Volney. The entourage was closely related to the continuing salon of Claude Adrien Helvétius, run by his widow Anne-Catherine de Ligniville, Madame Helvétius.

The secrecy led defenders of Mirabeau's reputation in the 19th century to discount passages in Dumont's memoirs dealing with the atelier. Scholarly work by Aulard and Philippe Plan (Un Collaborateur de Mirabeau, 1874, on Reynaz) began to turn the tide.
