= Lameth =

Lameth is a surname. Notable people with the surname include:

- Alexandre Lameth (1760–1829), French soldier and politician
- Charles Malo François Lameth (1757–1832), French politician and soldier
