= Jacques Pierre Brissot =

French revolutionary (1754–1793)

Jacques Pierre Brissot de Warville
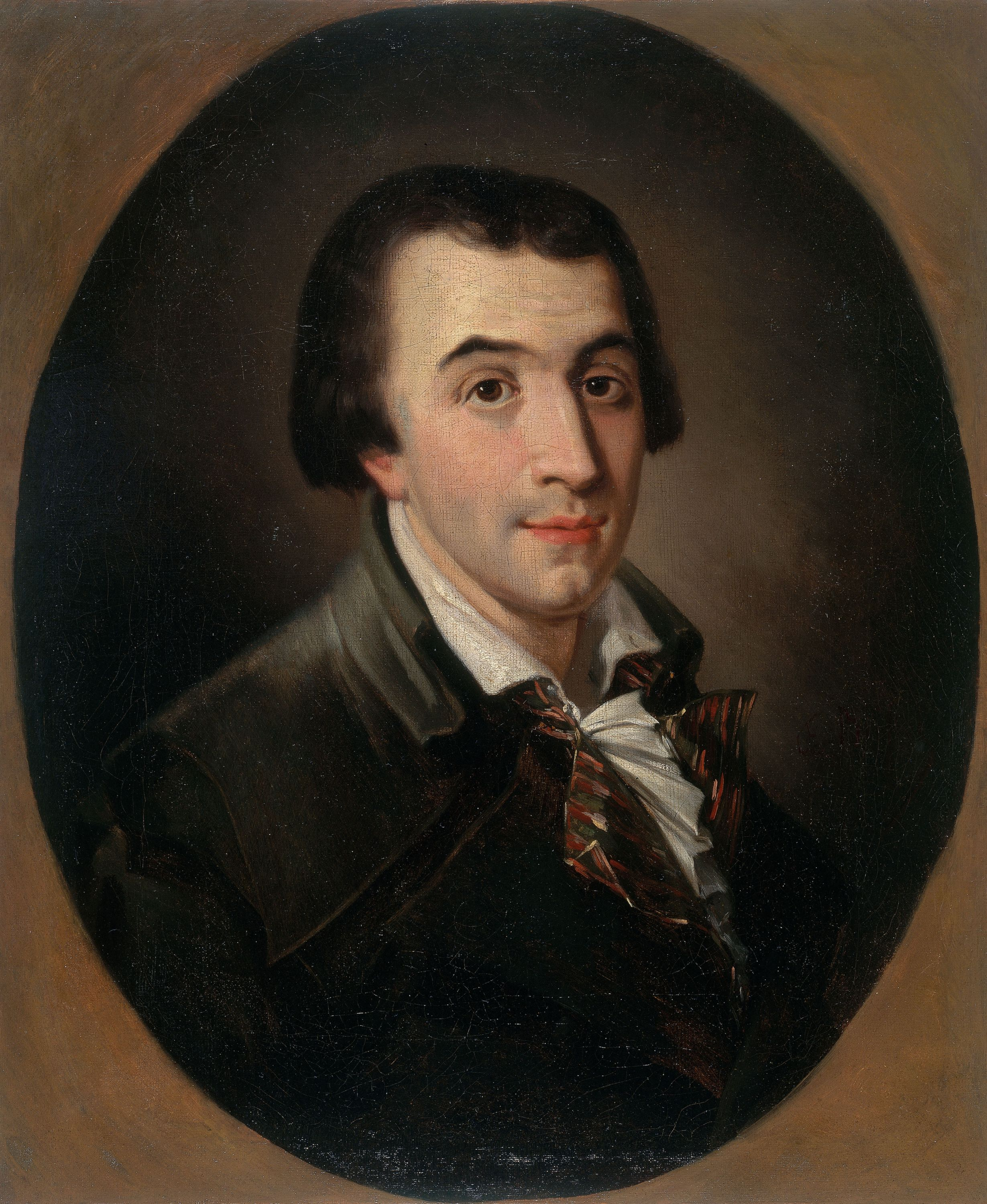
- Portrait by François Bonneville, c. 1790

Member of the National Convention for Eure-et-Loir
- In office 20 September 1792 – 30 October 1793
- Preceded by: Étienne Claye
- Succeeded by: Claude Julien Maras
- Constituency: Chartres

Member of the Legislative Assembly for Seine
- In office 1 October 1791 – 19 September 1792
- Succeeded by: Antoine Sergent-Marceau
- Constituency: Paris

Personal details
- Born: Jacques Pierre Brissot; 15 January 1754 Chartres, Orléanais, France
- Died: 31 October 1793 (aged 39) Paris, France
- Cause of death: Execution by guillotine
- Resting place: Chapelle expiatoire, Paris; 48.873611°N 2.322778°E
- Party: Girondin
- Spouse: Félicité Dupont (m. 1782)
- Children: Pierre Augustin Félix; Edme Augustin Sylvain; Jacques Jérôme Anacharsis
- Education: University of Orléans
- Profession: Journalist, publisher

Jacques Pierre Brissot (French pronunciation: [ʒak pjɛʁ bʁiso]; 15 January 1754 – 31 October 1793), also known as Brissot de Warville, was a French journalist, abolitionist, and revolutionary leading the faction of the Girondins (initially called Brissotins) at the National Convention in Paris.

Born in Chartres, Brissot trained as a law clerk, but acquired notoriety as a radical writer and journalist, winning the approval of Voltaire for his writings on the philosophy of law. He collaborated on the Mercure de France and the Courier de l'Europe, which sympathized with the insurgents in the American colonies.

In February 1788, Brissot founded the anti-slavery Society of the Friends of the Blacks. With the outbreak of the revolution in July 1789, he became one of its most vocal supporters. As a member of the Legislative Assembly, Brissot advocated for war against Austria and other European powers in order to secure France's revolutionary gains, which led to the War of the First Coalition in 1792. He voted against the immediate execution of Louis XVI which made him unpopular with the Montagnards. He was an intimate friend of Jean-Paul Marat in the 1780s, but from 1792 they became bitter political enemies.

On 3 April 1793, Maximilien Robespierre declared in the Convention that the whole war was a prepared game between Dumouriez and Brissot to overthrow the French First Republic. Conflicts with Robespierre, who accused him of royalism, eventually brought about his downfall. On 8 October, the Convention decided to arrest Brissot. Like Madame Roland and Pétion, Brissot was accused of organising (or taking part in) conspicuous dinners. At the end of October 1793, he was guillotined along with 28 other Girondins by Charles-Henri Sanson.

== Early life and family ==
Brissot was born in Chartres, the 13th child of a wealthy traiteur; but nine of his siblings died at infancy. Alongside his elder brother he was placed under the care of an uncle, residing in the countryside as priest. In 1762 he entered college, studying Latin and developing an admiration for the works of Voltaire, Diderot, and Rousseau. Transitioning to a career path, he began his tenure as a law clerk in 1769, initially in Chartres and later, from 1774, at the Parlement of Paris. Despite his legal aspirations, Brissot found himself embroiled in controversy due to the critical nature of some of his pamphlets, which scrutinized the government and the church. In 1777 Madame du Barry introduced him to Voltaire. In the same year he briefly visited London upon invitation. He relocated to Boulogne-sur-Mer when he was appointed editor of "Courier de l'Europe", a periodical that did not do well and failed. He decided to "anglicize" his last name by appending "Warville", after Ouarville, where his mother owned property. Brissot inherited a substantial amount of livres when his father died. In 1780 he moved to Reims to complete his studies.

His initial literary endeavors, including Théorie des lois criminelles (1781) and Bibliothèque philosophique du législateur (1782), delved into the philosophy of law, demonstrating a profound influence of the ethical principles championed by Jean-Jacques Rousseau. During a month-long stay with the affluent sugar and coffee planter Pierre-Alexandre DuPeyrou, Brissot found himself immersed in intellectual discourse. DuPeyrou, a Suriname native who relocated to Neuchâtel in 1747, had maintained a close relationship with Rousseau, providing financial support and overseeing the publication of his complete works. Brissot sent a summary to Voltaire, who praised his style and energy in a letter. Meanwhile, a law degree hardly charmed him, Brissot was more interested in linguistics and decided to become a journalist. In June he paid a visit to Clavière in Geneva. In September he married Félicité Dupont, the governess of the Duke of Chartres. Brissot visited London where he got engaged in establishing an Academy of Arts and Sciences; he lived at Newman Street with his wife and younger brother. Meanwhile, she translated English works, including those by Oliver Goldsmith and Robert Dodsley.

== Writer on social causes ==
In the preface of Théorie des lois criminelles, a plea for penal reform, Brissot explains that he submitted an outline of the book to Voltaire and quotes his answer from 13 April 1778. Brissot had a falling out with Catholicism, and wrote about his disagreements with the church's hierarchical system. Brissot became known as a writer and journalist who was engaged on the Mercure de France, the Courier de l'Europe and other facilitating the distribution of libelles. Devoted to the cause of humanity, he proposed a plan for the collaboration of all European intellectuals. His newspaper Journal du Lycée de Londres, was to be the organ of this commercial enterprise starting at Pall Mall in January 1784. He was in conflict with Charles Théveneau de Morande. The plan was unsuccessful and Brissot lost his investments. In May he was arrested and put in jail at Gray's Inn Road; a friend paid the printer for the prospectus. Soon after his return to Paris, Brissot was on the charge of having published a pornographic pamphlet Passe-temps de Toinette against the queen of France Marie Antoinette. The pamphlet was considered extremely provocative as it was perceived as opposing the queen. On 12 July Brissot was imprisoned in the Bastille but was released after two months as he was not the author. He read Confessions six times and a popular account of the New World, Letters of an American Farmer by Jean de Crèvecoeur.

After gaining release, Brissot returned to pamphleteering, most notably his 1785 open letter to emperor Joseph II of Austria, Seconde lettre d'un défenseur du peuple a l'Empereur Joseph II, sur son règlement concernant, et principalement sur la révolte des Valaques, which supported the right of subjects to revolt against the misrule of a monarch (in Bulgaria). Because of the controversy, this generated, he went to London for a time. He was influenced by the dissenters Richard Price and Joseph Priestley.

In 1785, Louis Philippe II, Duke of Orléans, an admirer of Britain's Westminster system and constitutional monarchy and the main opponent of France's absolute monarchy, approved Brissot's plan to dispatch the Chevalier de Saint-Georges to London. He believed it was a way to ensure the Regent-in-waiting's support of Philippe as the future "Regent" of France. However, Brissot had a secret agenda as well; he considered Saint-Georges, a "man of color", the ideal person to contact his fellow abolitionists in London and ask their advice about Brissot's plans for the founding of an abolitionist group modeled after the British Society for Effecting the Abolition of the Slave Trade. It is supposed Saint-Georges delivered Brissot's request to translate the publications of the abolitionists William Wilberforce and Thomas Clarkson into French. On his first trip to London, Saint-Georges passed Brissot's request to British abolitionists, who complied by translating their publications into French for his fledgling abolitionist society. Banat assumes Saint-Georges met with them again, but Adam Hochschild in Bury the Chains did not find any trace of this.

In collaboration with Clavière, Brissot published De la France et des Etats-Unis ou de l'importance de la révolution de l'Amérique pour le bonheur de la France; the book extoiled the economic benefits to France stemming from the American Revolution and encouraged French emulation of American liberty. In summer 1787 he and Clavière visited Utrecht, then a "democratic eldorado" to study the resistance against the House of Orange and the Habsburgs. Just before the Prussian invasion of Holland they travelled to Rotterdam, where they met the Abbé Sièyes, and then to Amsterdam where they met with Dutch banker Pieter Stadnitski. By the end of September they were back in Paris. At some time Stadnitsky decided sent Brissot as an undercover asset scout to Philadelphia.

== Abolitionists ==
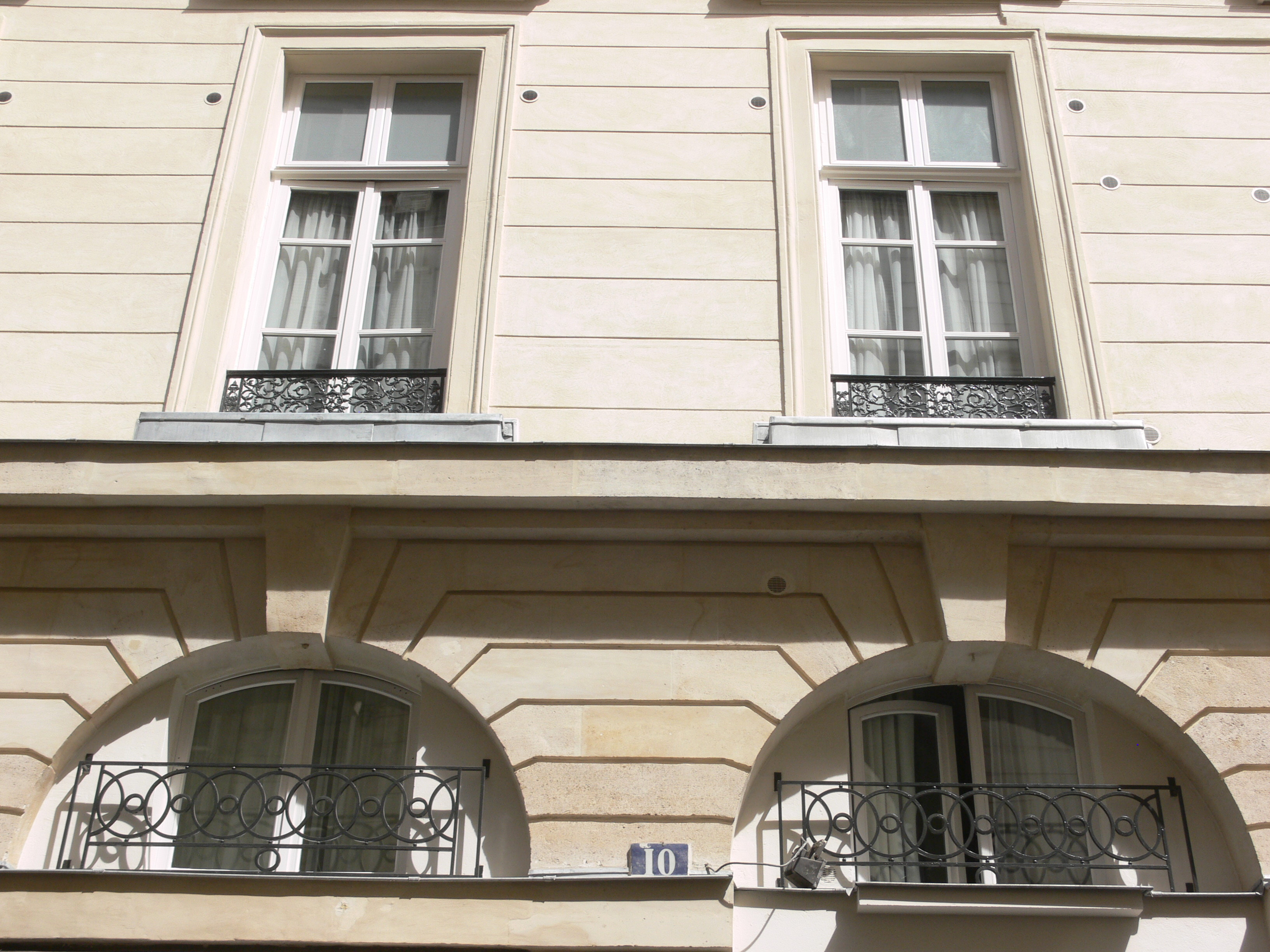
Clavière and Brissot lived at 10 rue d'Amboise in 1789.

On a second visit to London, accompanied by Charles-Louis Ducrest, the brother of Madame de Genlis, he became acquainted with some of the leading British abolitionists. After returning to Paris on 19 February 1788, he and Clavière founded an abolitionist group known as the Society of the Friends of the Blacks and was their secretary. In 1788, Choderlos de Laclos, who replaced Brissot as Philippe's chief of staff, intensified Brissot's campaign to promote Philippe as an alternative to the monarchy.

As an agent of the newly formed society, Brissot travelled to the United States from June 1788 to January 1789 to visit abolitionists there. The country had gained independence several years before but was still a slave state. He also met with members of the constitutional convention in Philadelphia to find out what he could about the domestic debt of the United States and researching investment opportunities in Scioto Company. Brissot launched a plan to promote emigration to the United States. At one point, he was interested in emigrating to America with his family. Thomas Jefferson, the American ambassador in Paris when he returned, was familiar enough with him to note, "Warville is returned charmed with our country. He is going to carry his wife and children to settle there." However, such an emigration never happened. In 1789 he published a pamphlet arguing that French deputies owed any black Frenchman and any enslaved people in the French colonies their "sacred rights" as much as any white man. In 1789 he was elected a Foreign Honorary Member of the American Academy of Arts and Sciences. Brissot was elected to the American Philosophical Society in 1789.

He was president of the Society of the Friends of the Blacks during 1790 and 1791. The rising ferment of revolution engaged Brissot in schemes for progress through political journalism that would make him a household name. In 1791 he published his Nouveau Voyage dans les États-Unis de l'Amérique septentrionale (3 vol.). Brissot believed that American ideals could help improve the French government. In 1791, Brissot along with Marquis de Condorcet, Thomas Paine, and Étienne Dumont created a newspaper promoting republicanism titled Le Républicain.

== French Revolution ==
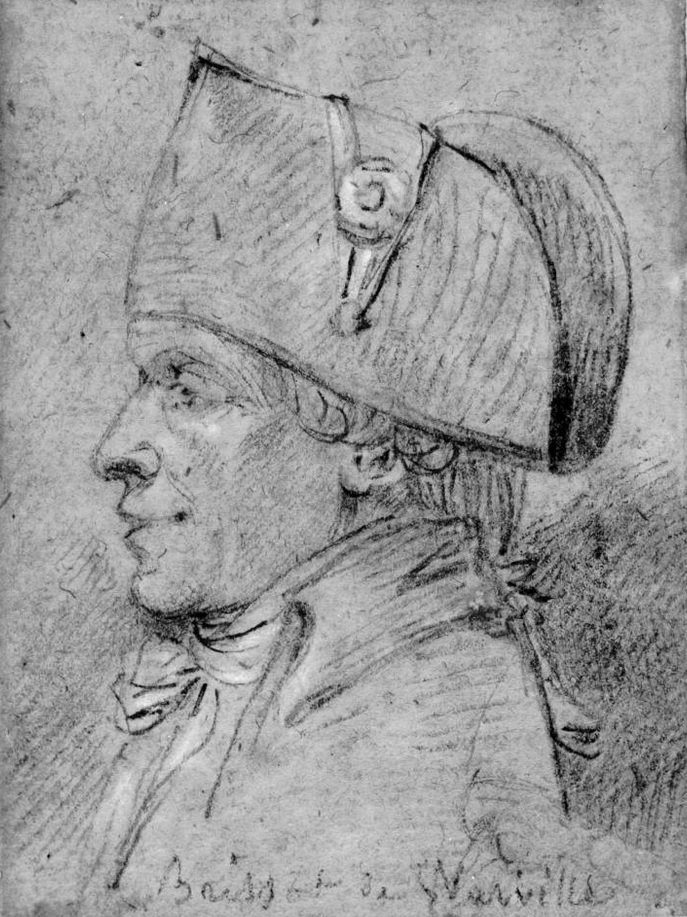
Portrait de Brissot

From the outbreak of the French Revolution in 1789, Brissot became one of its most vocal supporters. He edited the Patriote français from 1789 to 1793 and took a prominent part in politics. Famous for his speeches at the Jacobin Club, he was elected a member of the municipality of Paris, then of the Legislative Assembly. He witnessed at the marriage of Camille and Lucile Desmoulins in December 1790, together with Pétion de Villeneuve and Robespierre. On 30 November 1789, Brissot suggested a scheme of municipal constitution for Paris, working in collaboration with the National Assembly and the Assembly of Representatives of the Paris commune, but this plan had to be abandoned when it was refused by the local, decentralized districts of Paris, who had always been more revolutionary than their leaders.

The Girondins, or Brissotins as they were initially called, were a group of loosely affiliated individuals, many of whom came from Gironde, rather than an organized party, but the main ideological emphasis was on preventing revolution and protecting private property. This group was first led by Brissot. Robespierre, representing the party of the extreme left, loathed the Girondins.

=== Champ de Mars Massacre involvement ===
Leading up to this event, France was in political turmoil following the attempted escape of King Louis XVI and his family. The escape attempt heightened tensions and divisions within French society, particularly among the Third Estate. Brissot, a leading republican in the Girondin faction and a leading voice of the republican movement, was involved in drafting a petition demanding the removal of King Louis XVI. He along with other members managed to get approximately 6,000 signatures for the petition they circulated on 17 July 1791, during the gathering at the Champ de Mars. This petition, backed by the Cordeliers Club and other parties, argued that the king, by attempting to flee, had effectively abdicated his throne. The petition called for a national referendum on the future of the monarchy and was essentially a republican manifesto. In 1791 Robespierre persuaded the Jacobin clubs not to support the petition by Danton and Brissot.

=== Foreign policy ===
News of the Declaration of Pillnitz (27 August 1791) reached France shortly before the convening of the new Legislative Assembly, which Brissot rapidly came to dominate. The declaration was from Austria and Prussia, warning the people of France not to harm Louis XVI or these nations would "militarily intervene" in the politics of France. Threatened by the declaration, Brissot rallied the support of the Assembly, which subsequently declared war on Austria on 20 April 1792. They wanted to fortify and secure the revolution. This decision was initially disastrous as the French armies were crushed during the first engagements, leading to a major increase in political tensions within the country.

During the Legislative Assembly, Brissot's knowledge of foreign affairs enabled him as a member of the diplomatic committee to control much of France's foreign policy. Brissot was a key figure in the French Republic's declaration of war against Austria, the Dutch Republic and Great Britain on 1 February 1793. It was also Brissot who characterized these wars as part of revolutionary propaganda.

On 26 March 1792, Guadet accused Robespierre of superstition, relying on divine providence. Shortly after Robespierre was accused by Brissot and Guadet of trying to become the idol of the people. Being against the war Robespierre was also accused of acting as a secret agent for the "Austrian Committee". The Girondins planned strategies to out-maneuver Robespierre's influence among the Jacobins. On 27 April, as part of his speech responding to the accusations by Brissot and Guadet against him, he threatened to leave the Jacobins, claiming he preferred to continue his mission as an ordinary citizen.

On 17 May, Robespierre released the first issue of his weekly periodical Le Défenseur de la Constitution (The Defender of the Constitution). In this publication, he criticized Brissot and expressed his skepticism over the war movement.

=== Election ===
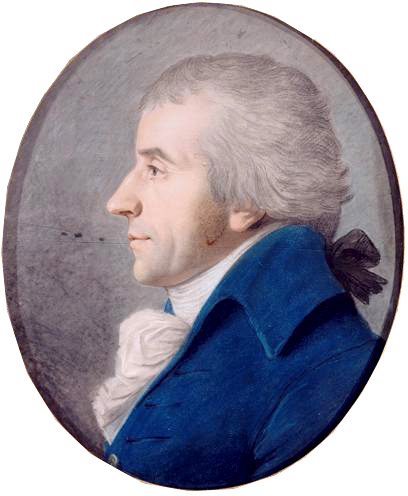
Jacques Pierre Brissot de Warville

In August 1792 Brissot urged the preservation of the constitution, advocating against both the dethronement of the king and the election of a new assembly. Robespierre was no longer willing to cooperate with Brissot, who promoted the Duke of Brunswick, and Roland. On Sunday morning 2 September the members of the Commune, gathering in the town hall to proceed the election of deputies to the National Convention, decided to maintain their seats and have Rolland and Brissot arrested.

In Paris suspected Girondin and Feuillant candidates were boycotted; Robespierre made sure Brissot (and his fellow Brissotins Pétion and Condorcet) could not be elected in Paris. Mayor Pétion de Villeneuve, ("Roi Pétion") finally rallied to Brissot. Brissot refrained from further visits to the Jacobin club. Madame Roland wrote to a friend: "We are under the knife of Robespierre and Marat, those who would agitate the people."

In September 1792 he was elected deputy in the National Convention. where he represented Eure-et-Loir. On 24 October 1792, Brissot published another pamphlet, in which he declared the need for a coup against anarchists and the decentralized, populist element of the French Revolution, going so far as to demand the abolition of the Paris Commune. In December he published an account on the trial of the King. In March 1793, Robespierre was convinced Brissot and Dumouriez wanted to overthrow the French First Republic. Dumouriez's defection on the next day changed the course of the events for the Brissotins. On 6 April the Committee of Public Safety was installed; Philippe Égalité was arrested. Robespierre accused Brissot, Isnard, Vergniaud, Guadet and Gensonné as infidel deputies.

=== Arrest and execution ===
On 6 April 1793 the Committee of Public Safety was installed on the proposal of Maximin Isnard, supported by Georges Danton. The Committee was composed of nine deputies from the Plaine and the Dantonists, but no Girondins or Robespierrists. As one of the first acts of the Committee, Marat, president of the Jacobin club, called for the expulsion of twenty-two Girondins. Robespierre, who was not elected, was pessimistic about the prospects of parliamentary action and told the Jacobins that it was necessary to raise an army of Sans-culottes to defend Paris and arrest infidel deputies, naming and accusing Brissot, Isnard, Vergniaud, Guadet and Gensonné.

The end of Brissot appeared in sight when, on 26 May 1793, Brissot authored "To His Constituents", in which he demanded the guillotining of "the anarchists", and tried to rouse the middle classes to resist the decentralized departments, which had not taken the lead from Robespierre but rather from The Mountain and largely local organizers and agitators. Brissot was condemned and then escaped from Paris, going to Normandy and Brittany, where he and other Girondists, such as Pétion, Gaudet, Barbaroux, Louvet, Buzot, and Lanjuinais, had planned to organize Counter-Revolutionary Vendée Uprising. Here Brissot had seized the delegates of the convention, having them arrested, but the uprising was short-lived, as the masses marched through the streets and overthrew Brissot and his clique.

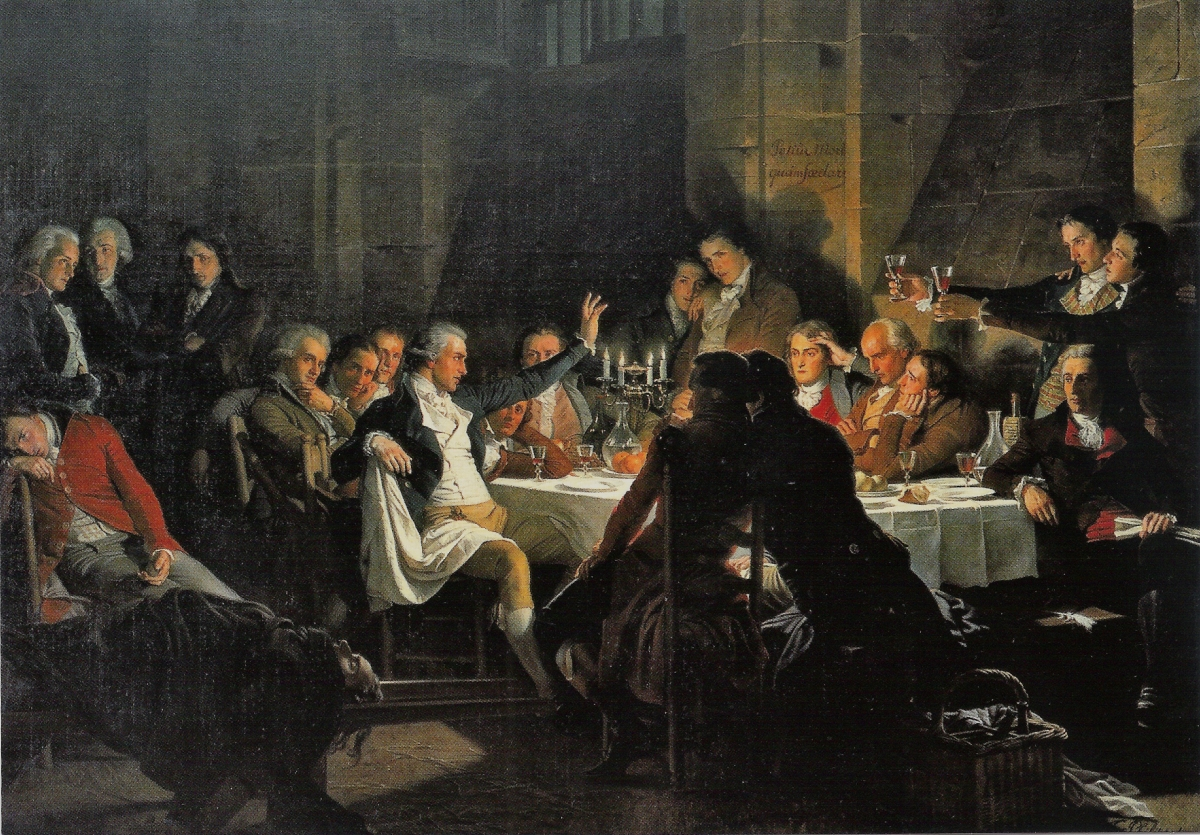
The Last Banquet of the Girondins by Henri Félix Emmanuel Philippoteaux, 1850. The body of Charles Éléonor Dufriche-Valazé, who stabbed himself in the courtroom, is in the foreground.

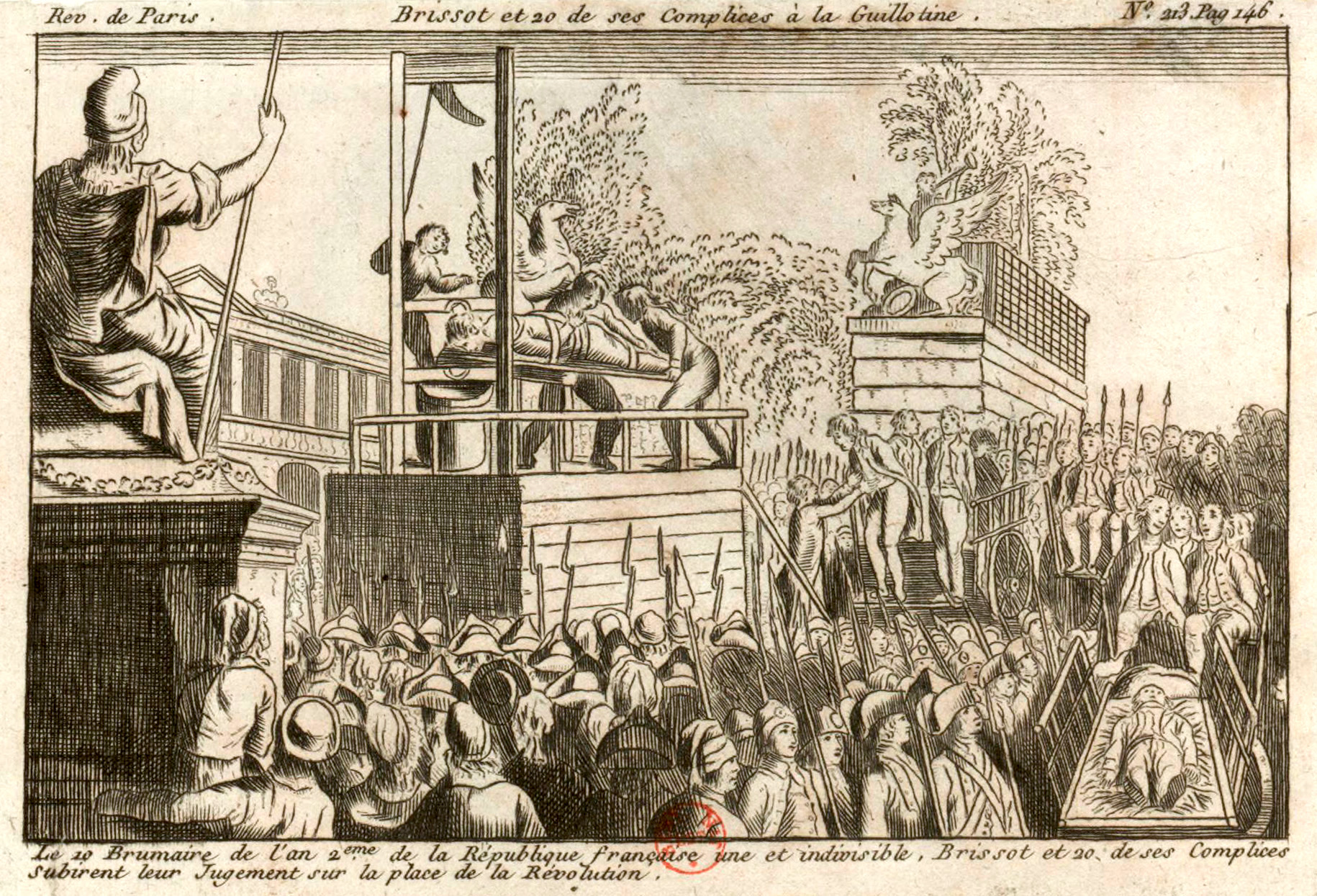
Execution of Brissot, 31 October 1793 = 10 Brumaire, l'an II

On 28 May a weak Robespierre excused himself twice for his physical condition but attacked in particular Brissot of royalism. He referred to 25 July 1792 where their points of view split. In late May 1793, the Montagnards in the convention, meeting in the Salle du Manège, called for the removal of the Commission of Twelve. The convention was further radicalized by the call for the removal and arrest of Brissot and the entire Girondin faction made by the sans-culottes in the Parisian National Guard, which had armed with cannons and surrounded the convention. When the refusal of the convention to make such a hasty decision was delivered to the National Guard, François Hanriot, its leader, replied: "Tell your stupid president that he and his Assembly are doomed and that if within one hour he doesn't deliver to me the twenty-two, I'm going to blast it!" Under this threat of violence, the Convention capitulated and on 2 June 1793, Brissot and the other Girondins were arrested.

Brissot was one of the first Girondins to escape but was also one of the first captured. Passing through his hometown Chartres on his way to the city of Caen, the centre of anti-revolutionary forces in Normandy, he was caught travelling with false papers on 10 June and taken back to Paris. On 3 October, the trial of Brissot and the Girondins began. They were charged with being "agents of the counter-revolution and the foreign powers, especially Britain." Brissot, who conducted his own defence, attacked point by point the absurdities of the charges against him and his fellow Girondins.

On 8 October the Convention decided to arrest Brissot and the Girondins. Robespierre called for the dissolution of the Convention; he believed they would be admired by posterity. Pierre-Joseph Cambon replied that was not his intention; applause followed and the session was closed.

He was unsuccessful, and on 30 October the death sentence was delivered to Brissot and the 21 other Girondins. The next day, the convicted men were taken by tumbrel to the guillotine, singing La Marseillaise as they travelled, and embracing the role of martyred patriots. Brissot was executed on 31 October 1793 at age 39. His corpse was buried in the Madeleine cemetery or the Chapelle expiatoire alongside his guillotined associates.

== Spying allegations ==
Robespierre and Marat were among those who accused Brissot of various kinds of counterrevolutionary activity, such as, Orléanism, "federalism", being in British pay, having failed to vote for the immediate death of the former king, and having been a collaborator with General Dumouriez, widely considered a traitor following his 5 April defection to the Austrians.

Brissot's activities after the siege of the Bastille have been closely studied. While enthusiasts and apologists consider Brissot to be an idealist and unblemished, philosophe revolutionary, his detractors have challenged his credibility and moral character. They have repeated contemporary allegations that during the mid-1780s, he defrauded his business partner, was involved in the production and dissemination of libelles – pornographic and otherwise – and spied for the police. The accusations were led by Jean-Paul Marat, Camille Desmoulins, Maximilien Robespierre, and above all the notorious scandal-monger, extortioner, and perjurer Charles Théveneau de Morande, whose hatred, Brissot asserted, 'was the torment of my life'. Brissot was accused of organizing (or taking part in) conspicuous dinners.

In 1968 historian Robert Darnton affirmed some of these accounts, and reaffirmed them in the 1980s, holding Brissot up as a case-study in the understanding of the difficult circumstances many philosophes encountered attempting to support themselves by their writing. Brissot's life and thinking are so well documented, from his early age through to his execution, many historians have examined him as a representative figure displaying the Enlightenment attitudes that drove many of the leading French revolutionaries. Thus, he undoubtedly exemplified the beliefs of many supporters of the Revolution. Darnton sees him in this way, but also argued that he was intimately tangled in the business of "Grub Street", the scrappy world of publishing for profit in the eighteenth century, which was essential to the spread of Enlightenment ideas. Thus, Darnton explores his relationship to his business partners, to the libellistes who wrote scandalous accusations against the crown and other leading figures, and to the police, arguing that based on suggestive evidence it is probable that when Brissot fell on hard financial times in the mid-1780s he agreed to operate as a police spy. Historian Frederick Luna has argued that the letters and memoirs from which Darnton drew his information were written fifteen years after his supposed employment and that the timeline does not work out because Brissot was documented as having left Paris as soon as he was released from the Bastille (where he was held on suspicion of writing libelles) and therefore could not have talked with the police as alleged. More convincing still is the work of historian Simon Burrows who, drawing on the Brissot papers (deposited in the Archives Nationales in 1982), comprehensively engages each of Darnton's speculations demonstrating that Brissot's financial problems were not evidence of fraud, that while – like many others – he traded in books and may have transported libelles, there is no evidence that he wrote them, and that while like many others he collected and collated general information on contemporary opinion in France for royal officials, there is no evidence that he operated as a paid police spy. As Burrows further notes, Darnton has progressively retreated from his earlier speculations, and he argues Brissot's behaviour in the 1780s and after, while it demonstrates his willingness to compromise with authority to advance his career, also demonstrates him to be "a committed philosophe and reformer, keen to avoid unnecessary entanglements in illegal activities, who despite his political radicalism, aspired to advise the regime and serve like-minded patrons."

== Legacy ==
Through his writings, Brissot made important contributions to "pre-revolutionary and revolutionary ideology in France". His early works on legislation, his many pamphlets, speeches in the Legislative Assembly and the convention, demonstrated dedication to the principles of the French Revolution. Brissot's idea of a fair, democratic society, with universal suffrage, living in moral as well as political freedom, foreshadowed many modern liberationist ideologies.

Historian and political theorist Peter Kropotkin suggested that Brissot represented the "defenders of property" and the "states-men", which would become the Girondins, also known as the "War Party." They were known for this name because they clamoured for a war that would ultimately force the king to step down (as opposed to a popular revolution); Brissot is quoted as saying, "We want some great treachery." His opinion, recorded in his pamphlet "A sel commettants" ("To Salt Principals"), was that the masses had no "managing capacity" and that he feared a society ruled by "the great unwashed." Writing on 23 May 1793, Brissot had commented...

"I have declared, since the beginning of the Convention that there was in France a party of dis-organizers, which was tending towards the dissolution of the Republic, even while it was in its cradle.... I can prove to-day: first, that this party of anarchists has dominated and still dominates nearly all the deliberations of the Convention and the workings of the Executive Council; secondly, that this party has been and still is the sole cause of all the evils, internal as well as the external, which afflict France; and thirdly, that the Republic can only be saved by taking rigorous measures to wrest the representatives of the nation from the despotism of this faction... Laws that are not carried into effect, authorities without force and despised, crime unpunished, property attacked, the safety of the individual violated, the morality of the people corrupted, no constitution, no government, no justice, these are the features of anarchy!"

Brissot was also very interested in science. He was a strong disciple of Sextus Empiricus and applied those theories to modern science at the time in order to make knowledge well known about the enlightenment of Ethos.

The varying actions of Brissot in the 1780s also helped create a key understanding of how the Enlightenment Republic of letters was transformed into a revolutionary Republic of Letters.

The Encyclopædia Britannica 11th edition, remarked: "Brissot was quick, eager, impetuous, and a man of wide knowledge. However, he was indecisive, and not qualified to struggle against the fierce energies roused by the events of the Revolution." Brissot's stance on the King's execution and the war with Austria, and his moderate views on the Revolution intensified the friction between the Girondins and Montagnards, who allied themselves with disaffected sans-culottes. Brissot ultimately attempted to rein in the violence and excesses of the Revolution by calling for the reinstatement of the constitutional monarchy that had been established by the French Constitution of 1791, a ploy that landed on deaf ears.

== Works ==
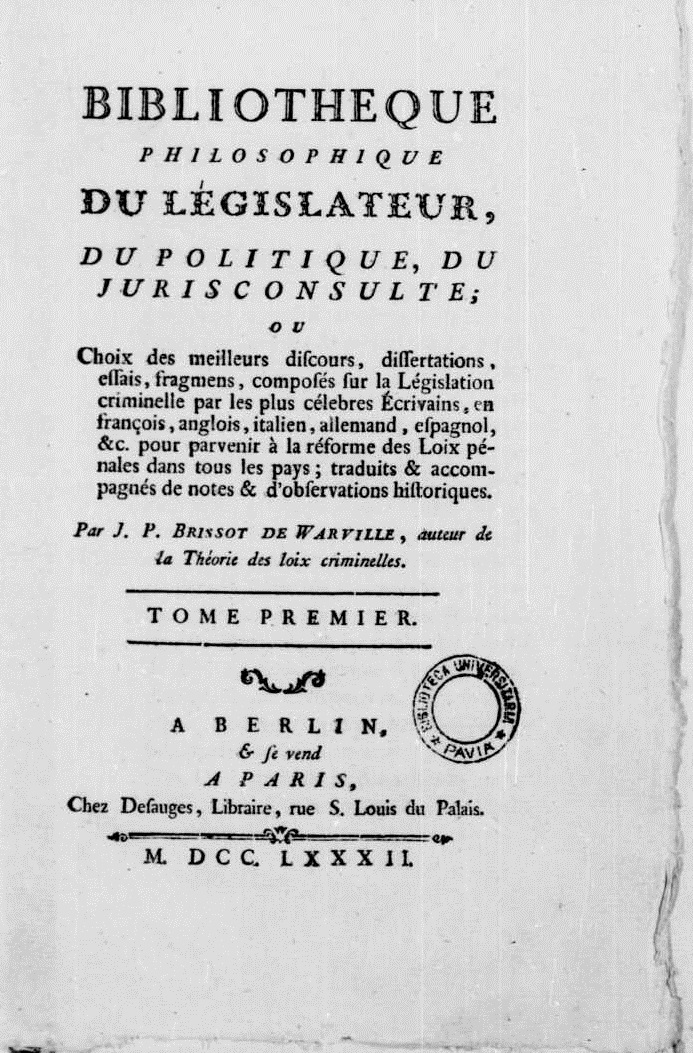
Bibliothèque philosophique du Législateur, du Politique, du Jurisconsulte, 1782

- Recherches philosophiques sur le droit de propriété considéré dans la nature, pour servir de premier chapitre à la "Théorie des lois" de M. Linguet, Paris, 1780, 128 p., in-8°.
- Bibliothèque philosophique du Législateur, du Politique et du Jurisconsulte, Berlin et Paris, 1782–1786, 10 vol. in-8°.
  - Bibliotheque philosophique du législateur, du politique, du jurisconsulte (in French). Vol. 1. Berlin : Desauges; Lyon : Grabit & Rosset. 1782.
  - Bibliotheque philosophique du législateur, du politique, du jurisconsulte (in French). Vol. 3. Berlin : Desauges; Lyon : Grabit & Rosset. 1783.
  - Bibliotheque philosophique du législateur, du politique, du jurisconsulte (in French). Vol. 4. Berlin : Desauges; Lyon : Grabit & Rosset. 1782.
  - Bibliotheque philosophique du législateur, du politique, du jurisconsulte (in French). Vol. 5. Berlin : Desauges; Lyon : Grabit & Rosset. 1782.
  - Bibliotheque philosophique du législateur, du politique, du jurisconsulte (in French). Vol. 6. Berlin : Desauges; Lyon : Grabit & Rosset. 1782.
  - Bibliotheque philosophique du législateur, du politique, du jurisconsulte (in French). Vol. 7. Berlin : Desauges; Lyon : Grabit & Rosset. 1782.
  - Bibliotheque philosophique du législateur, du politique, du jurisconsulte (in French). Vol. 8. Berlin : Desauges; Lyon : Grabit & Rosset. 1782.
  - Bibliotheque philosophique du législateur, du politique, du jurisconsulte (in French). Vol. 9. Berlin : Desauges; Lyon : Grabit & Rosset. 1782.
  - Bibliotheque philosophique du législateur, du politique, du jurisconsulte (in French). Vol. 10. Berlin : Desauges; Lyon : Grabit & Rosset. 1785.
- Moyens d'adoucir la rigueur des lois pénales en France sans nuire à la sécurité publique, Discours couronné par l'Académie de Châlons-sur-Marne en 1780, Châlons, 1781, in-8°.
- Théorie des lois criminelles, Paris, 1781, 2 vol. in-8°.
- De la Vérité des Méditations sur les moyens de parvenir à la vérité dans toutes les connaissances humaines, Neufchâtel et Paris, 1782, in-8°.
- Discours sur la nécessité de maintenir le décret rendu le 13 mai 1791, en faveur des hommes de couleur libres, prononcé le 12 septembre 1791, à la séance de la Société des Amis de la Constitution, séante aux jacobins.
- Discours sur la nécessité politique de révoquer le décret du 24 septembre 1791, pour mettre fin aux troubles de Saint Domingue; prononcé à l'Assemblée nationale, le 2 mars 1792. Par J.P. Brissot, député du département de Paris, Paris : De l'Imprimerie du patriote françois, 1792.
- Correspondance universelle sur ce qui intéresse le bonheur de l'homme et de la société, Londres et Neufchâtel, 1783, 2 vol. in-8°.
- Journal du Lycée de Londres, ou Tableau des sciences et des arts en Angleterre, Londres et Paris, 1784.
- Tableau de la situation actuelle des Anglais dans les Indes orientales, et Tableau de l'Inde en général, ibid., 1784, in-8°.
- L'Autorité législative de Rome anéantie, Paris, 1785, in-8°, réimprimé sous le titre : Rome jugée, l'autorité du pape anéantie, pour servir de réponse aux bulles passées, nouvelles et futures du pape, ibid., 1731, m-g.
- Examen critique des voyages dans l'Amérique septentrionale, de M. le marquis de Chatellux, ou Lettre à M. le marquis de Chatellux, dans laquelle on réfute principalement ses opinions sur les quakers, sur les nègres, sur le peuple et sur l'homme, par J.-P. Brissot de Warville, Londres, 1786, in-8°.
- Discours sur la Rareté du numéraire, et sur les moyens d'y remédier, 1790, in-8°.
- Mémoire sur les Noirs de l'Amérique septentrionale, 1790, in-8°.
- Voyage aux États-Unis, 1791.
- De la France et des Etats-Unis; ou Vlmportance de la Revolution de VAmerique pour le Bon- heur de la Fran, 1787

His Mémoires and his Testament politique (4 vol.) were published in 1829–1832 by his sons with François Mongin de Montrol:

- Mémoires de Brissot... sur ses contemporains, et la révolution française; publ. par son fils; notes et éclaircissements hist. par M.F. de Montrol, 1830–1832; Vol. I (1830); Vol. II (1830); Vol. III (1832); Vol. IV (1832).

== Sources ==
- Banat, Gabriel (2006). The Chevalier de Saint-Georges: Virtuoso of the Sword and the Bow. Hillsdale, New York: Pendragon Press. ISBN 978-1-57647-109-8.
- Hampson, Norman (1974). The Life and Opinions of Maximilien Robespierre. Duckworth. ISBN 978-0-7156-0741-1.
- Linton, Marisa (2013). Choosing Terror: Virtue, Friendship, and Authenticity in the French Revolution. Oxford University Press. ISBN 978-0-19-957630-2.
- Schama, Simon (1989). Citizens: A Chronicle of the French Revolution (1st Vintage Books ed.). New York: Vintage Books, Alfred A. Knopf. ISBN 0679726101.
- Scurr, Ruth (2006). Fatal Purity: Robespierre and the French Revolution. Macmillan. ISBN 978-0-8050-8261-6.
