= Charles Théveneau de Morande =

French Spy and Journalist (1741-1805)

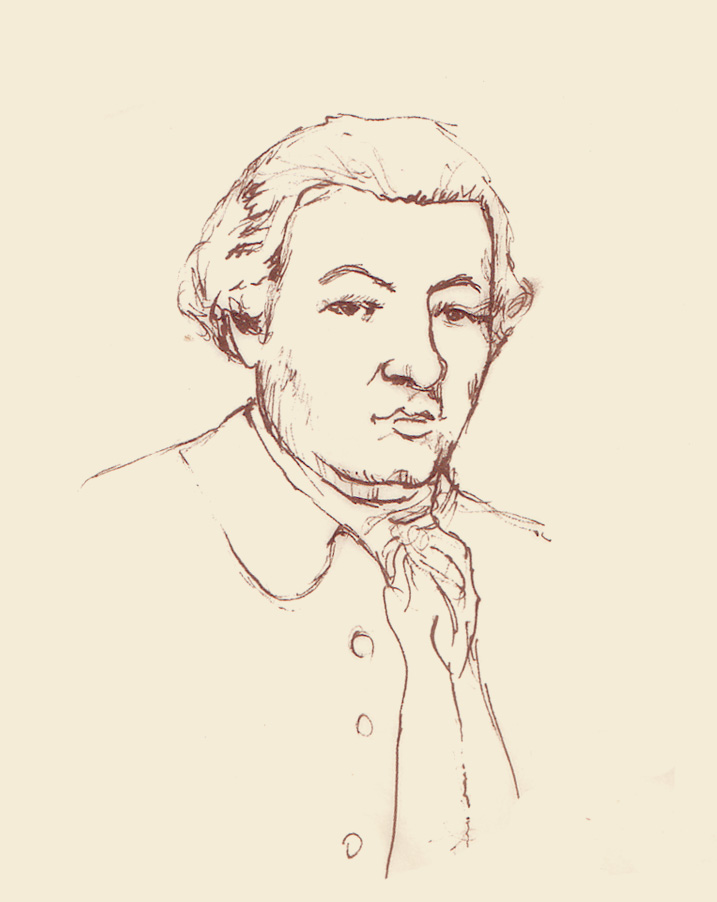
- Born: 9 November 1741; Arnay-le-Duc
- Died: 6 July 1805 (aged 63); Arnay-le-Duc
- Occupations: Journalist; Spy

Charles Théveneau de Morande (French pronunciation: [ʃaʁl tɛvno də mɔʁɑ̃d]; 9 November 1741– 6 July 1805) was a gutter journalist, blackmailer and French spy who lived in London in the 18th century.

== Bibliography ==
- Hannah Barker, Simon Burrows (ed.), Press, Politics and the Public Sphere in Europe and North America, 1760-1820, Cambridge University Press, 2002.
- Simon Burrows, « A Literary Low-Life Reassessed : Charles Théveneau de Morande in London, 1769-1791 », Eighteenth-Century Life, #22, 1er février 1998, p. 76-94.
- Simon Burrows, Blackmail, Scandal, and Revolution: London's French Libellistes, 1758-92, Manchester University Press, 2006; ISBN 0719065267, 9780719065262, 256 p.
  - Idem, A King's Ransom : The Life of Charles Théveneau de Morande, Blackmailer, Scandalmonger and Master-Spy, Londres, Continuum, 2010.
- Robert Darnton, Édition et sédition. L’univers de la littérature clandestine au XVIIIe, Paris, Gallimard, 1991, 278 p.
- Henri Doniol, Histoire de la participation de la France à l’établissement des États-Unis d’Amérique, Paris, 1866-1899. 6 vol.
- Frédéric Gaillardet, Mémoires du chevalier d’Éon, 2 vol., Paris, 1836
- Vivian R. Gruder, « Whither Revisionism ? Political Perspectives on the Ancien Regime », French Historical Studies, v. 20, #2, 1997, p. 245-285.
- M. de Loménie, Beaumarchais en son temps, étude sur le société en France au XVIIIe d’après des documents inédits, Paris, 1850, 2 vol.
- Didier Ozanam et Michel Antoine, Correspondance secrète du comte de Broglie et de Louis XV (1756-1774), Paris, Klincksieck, 1961 (Société de l'histoire de France), 2 vol., 1036 p.
- Gunnar et Mavis von Proschwitz, Beaumarchais et le Courier de l’Europe : documents inédits ou peu connus, documents inédits ou peu connus, Voltaire Foundation, 1990, 1289 p.
- Joseph-Marie Quérard, La France littéraire, Paris, 1827-1864, 12 vol.
- Paul Robiquet, Théveneau de Morande, étude sur le XVIIIe, Paris, A. Quantin imprimeur, 1882 Édition en ligne
- Jean Sgard (under the direction of), Dictionnaire des journalistes : 1600-1789, Voltaire foundation, 1999, 2 vol. ISBN 0-7294-0538-9

== Sources ==
- Louis Petit de Bachaumont, Mémoires secrets pour servir à l’histoire de la république des lettres en France…, 1762–69, publié par P. L. Jacob, 1874.
- Edgard Boutaric, Correspondance secrète inédite de Louis XV sur la politique étrangère avec le comte de Broglie Tercier, etc., Paris, Plon, 1866, 2 tomes.
- J.-P. Brissot, Mémoires, (1734-1793) publiés avec étude critique et notes par Claude Perroud (vol. 1).
- J.-B. Du Sault, Recueil d’anecdotes biographiques, historiques et politiques sur les personnages les plus remarquables et les événements les plus frappants de la Révolution française, Paris, 1798.
- Anne-Gédéon de La Fitte de Pelleport, Le Diable dans un Bénitier et la Métamorphose du Gazetier cuirassé en mouche, ou tentative du Sieur Receveur, Inspecteur de la Police de Paris, Chevalier de St. Louis pour établir à Londres une Police à l’Instar de celle de Paris…, Londres, 1783, 159 p.
- Pierre Manuel, La Police de Paris dévoilée..., vol.II, Paris Garnery, 1791, 2 vol, in-8.
- François Ravaisson Mollien (éd.), Archives de la Bastilles : documents inédits, A. Durand et Pedone-Lauriel, 1866-1904, vol. XV.
- Charles Théveneau de Morande, Réplique de Charles Théveneau de Morande à J. p. Brissot : sur les erreurs et les calomnies de sa réponse… supplément de l’Argus patriote, Paris, Froullé, 1791.
