= Étienne Clavière =

18th-century Swiss/French financier and revolutionary

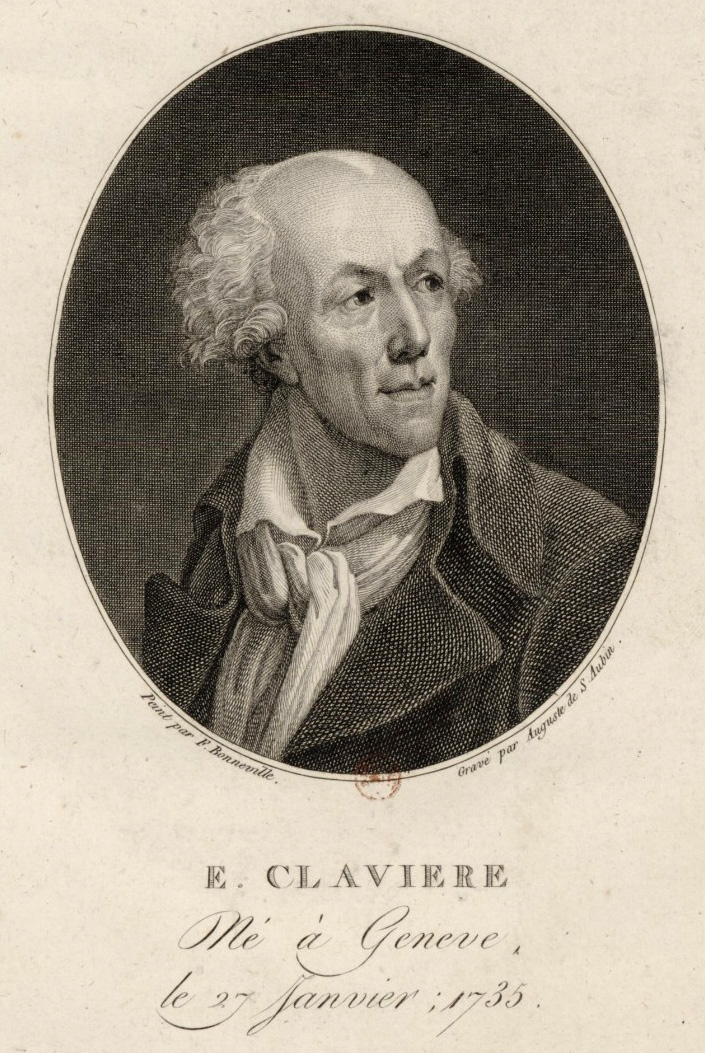
- Portrait by François Bonneville, c. 1790

Minister of Finance
- In office 24 March 1792 – 12 June 1792
- Preceded by: Louis Hardouin Tarbé
- Succeeded by: Antoine Duranthon
- In office 10 August 1792 – 2 June 1793
- Preceded by: Joseph Delaville-Leroulx
- Succeeded by: Louis Grégoire Deschamps Destournelles

Personal details
- Born: 29 January 1735 Geneva, Republic of Geneva
- Died: 8 December 1793 (aged 58) Paris, French Republic
- Party: Girondins
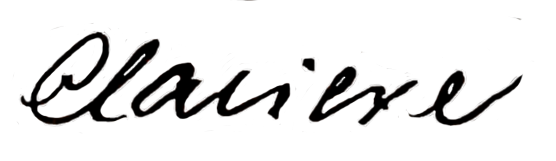
- Signature

Étienne Clavière (French pronunciation: [etjɛn klavjɛʁ]; 29 January 1735 – 8 December 1793) was a Genevan-born French financier and politician of the French Revolution. He was the French Minister of Finance between 24 March and 12 June 1792, and again between 10 August 1792 and 2 June 1793.

== Career in Geneva and exile ==
Clavière was born on 29 January 1735 in Geneva, Republic of Geneva to Jean-Jacques Clavière, a cloth merchant. His father was a Huguenot refugee from Serres who was admitted to the bourgeoisie of Geneva in 1735. After a commercial apprenticeship in Christian-Erlang, Clavière became a partner in the company Cazenove, Clavière et Fils. He emerged as a spokesman for the bourgeoisie during the Genevan political unrest of 1766–1768, and became a member of the Council of Two Hundred in 1770.

Clavière was one of the democratic leaders of the Geneva Revolution of 1782. After its suppression, he went into exile, becoming a financier in Paris in 1784. His brother moved to Brussels. Clavière associated with personalities from Neuchâtel and Geneva, among them Jean-Paul Marat and Étienne Dumont. Their plans for a "new Geneva" in Ireland—which the government of William Pitt the Younger favoured—were given up when Jacques Necker came to power in France, and Clavière, with most of his comrades, settled in Paris. In 1785, he collaborated with Theophile Cazenove.

In 1787, Clavière visited the Dutch Republic, together with Jacques Pierre Brissot, and met with the banker Pieter Stadnitski. The Patriots were losing influence and territory and the French politicians went back. He co-founded the Gallo-American Society with Brissot in 1787.

== French Revolution ==
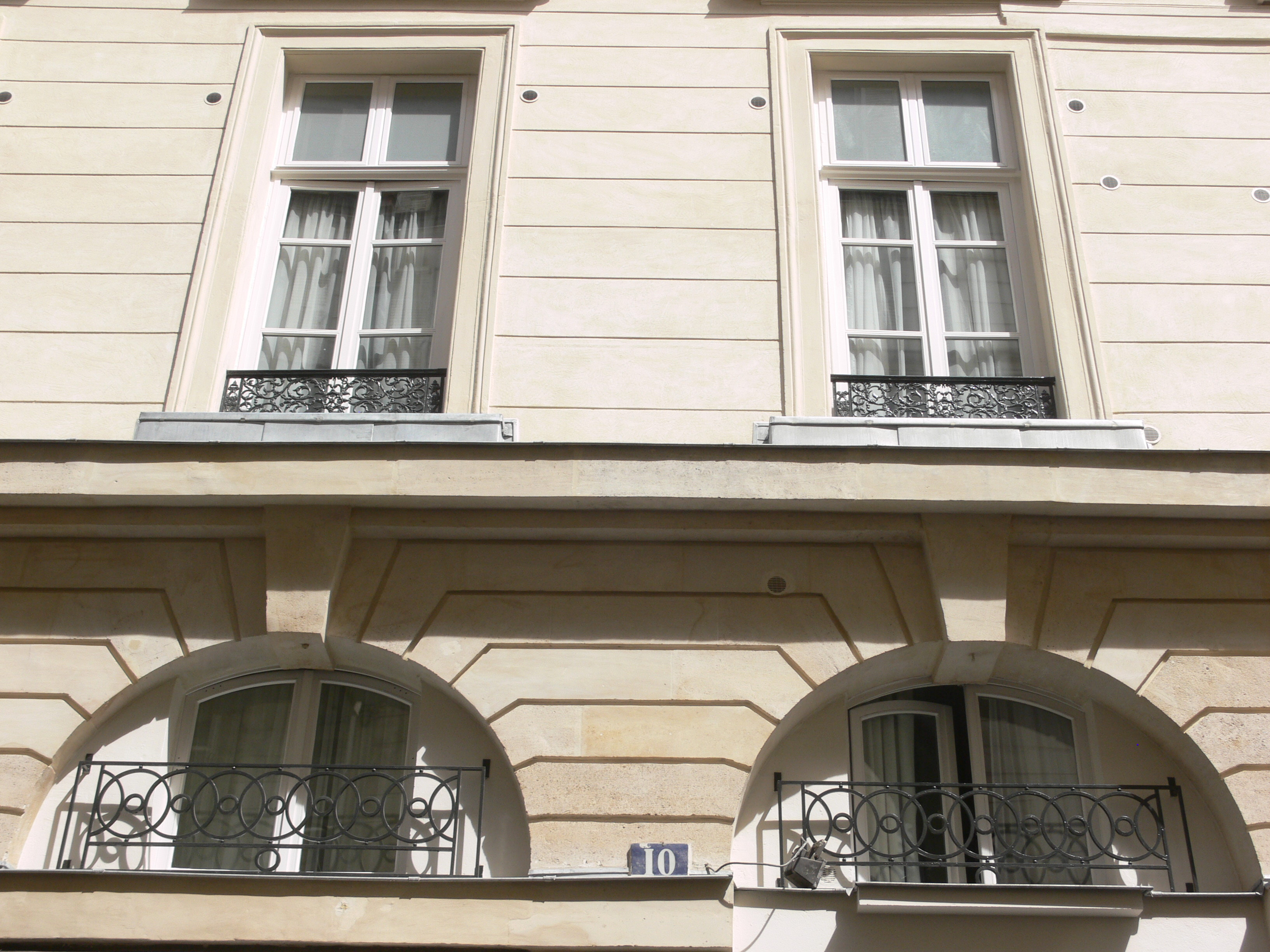
Clavière and Brissot lived at 10 rue d'Amboise in 1789

In 1789, Clavière and Dumont worked covertly for the Mirabeau atelier on the Courrier de Provence and also preparing speeches for Mirabeau—association with Clavière sustained Mirabeau's reputation as a financier. He was one of the founding members and the first president of the Society of the Friends of the Blacks and of the Jacobin Club.

Clavière also published some pamphlets under his own name, and through these and his friendship with Brissot, whom he had met in London, he was Minister of Finance in the Girondist ministry, from 24 March to 12 June 1792 as a suppleant member of the Legislative Assembly for Seine, and supported Brissot.

After the 10 August storming of Tuileries Palace, he was again given charge of the finances in the provisional executive council, but could not offer a remedy to France's financial difficulties (in particular, rampant inflation caused primarily by the excessive production of assignats). Clavière was a casualty of the fall of the Girondins, being arrested on 2 June 1793, but was not placed on trial with the rest in October. He remained in prison until 8 December, when, on receiving notice that he was to appear on the next day before the Revolutionary Tribunal, he died by suicide.
