= List of interior ministers of France =

This is a list of ministers of the interior of France (French: Ministres de l'Intérieur).

== Ministers of the interior (1790–present) ==
Minister	Began	Ended
François-Emmanuel Guignard, comte de Saint-Priest	7 August 1790	25 January 1791
Claude Antoine Valdec de Lessart	25 January 1791	29 November 1791
Bon-Claude Cahier de Gerville	29 November 1791	24 March 1792
Jean-Marie Roland de la Platière	24 March 1792	13 June 1792
Jacques Augustin Mourgue	13 June 1792	18 June 1792
Antoine René, marquis de Terrier de Monciel	18 June 1792	17 July 1792
Étienne Louis Hector Dejoly	17 July 1792	21 July 1792
Clément Felix Champion de Villeneuve	21 July 1792	10 August 1792
Jean-Marie Roland de la Platière	10 August 1792	23 January 1793
Dominique Joseph Garat	23 January 1793	20 August 1793
Jules-François Paré	20 August 1793	5 April 1794
Jean Marie Claude Alexandre Goujon	5 April 1794	8 April 1794
Martial Joseph Armand Herman	8 April 1794	20 April 1794
none	20 April 1794	3 November 1795
Pierre Bénézech	3 November 1795	15 July 1797
Nicolas-Louis François de Neufchâteau	15 July 1797	13 September 1797
François Sébastien Letourneux	13 September 1797	17 June 1798
Nicolas-Louis François de Neufchâteau	17 June 1798	22 June 1799
Nicolas Marie Quinette	22 June 1799	10 November 1799
Pierre-Simon Laplace	12 November 1799	25 December 1799
Lucien Bonaparte	25 December 1799	7 November 1800
Jean-Antoine Chaptal	7 November 1800	7 August 1804
Jean-Baptiste Nompère de Champagny	7 August 1804	9 August 1807
Emmanuel Crétet, comte de Champmol	9 August 1807	29 June 1809
Joseph Fouché, duc d'Otrante	29 June 1809	1 October 1809
Jean-Pierre Bachasson, comte de Montalivet	1 October 1809	1 April 1814
Jacques, comte Beugnot	3 April 1814	13 May 1814
François Xavier de Montesquiou-Fezensac	13 May 1814	20 March 1815
Lazare, comte Carnot	20 March 1815	22 June 1815
Claude Carnot-Feulin	22 June 1815	7 July 1815
Étienne-Denis, baron Pasquier	7 July 1815	26 September 1815
Vincent-Marie Viénot, comte de Vaublanc	26 September 1815	7 May 1816
Joseph, vicomte Lainé	7 May 1816	29 December 1818
Élie, comte Decazes	29 December 1818	20 February 1820
Joseph Jérôme, Comte Siméon	20 February 1820	14 December 1821
Jacques Joseph Guillaume Pierre, comte de Corbière	14 December 1821	4 January 1828
Jean-Baptiste Gay, vicomte de Martignac	4 January 1828	8 August 1829
François Régis de La Bourdonnaye, comte de La Bretèche	8 August 1829	18 November 1829
Guillaume-Isidore Baron de Montbel	18 November 1829	19 May 1830
Pierre-Denis, Comte de Peyronnet	19 May 1830	31 July 1830
Victor, duc de Broglie	31 July 1830	1 August 1830
François Guizot	1 August 1830	2 November 1830
Marthe Camille Bachasson, comte de Montalivet	2 November 1830	13 March 1831
Casimir Pierre Perier	13 March 1831	27 April 1832
Marthe Camille Bachasson, comte de Montalivet	27 April 1832	11 October 1832
Adolphe Thiers	11 October 1832	31 December 1832
Antoine, comte d'Argout	31 December 1832	4 April 1834
Adolphe Thiers	4 April 1834	10 November 1834
Hugues Bernard Maret, duc de Bassano	10 November 1834	18 November 1834
Adolphe Thiers	18 November 1834	22 February 1836
Marthe Camille Bachasson, comte de Montalivet	22 February 1836	6 September 1836
Adrien de Gasparin	6 September 1836	15 April 1837
Marthe Camille Bachasson, comte de Montalivet	15 April 1837	31 March 1839
Adrien de Gasparin	31 March 1839	12 May 1839
Charles Marie Tanneguy Duchâtel	12 May 1839	1 March 1840
Charles, comte de Rémusat	1 March 1840	29 October 1840
Charles Marie Tanneguy Duchâtel	29 October 1840	24 February 1848
Alexandre Ledru-Rollin	24 February 1848	11 May 1848
Adrien Recurt	11 May 1848	28 June 1848
Antoine Sénard	28 June 1848	13 October 1848
Jules Armand Dufaure	13 October 1848	20 December 1848
Léon de Malleville	20 December 1848	29 December 1848
Léon Faucher	29 December 1848	2 June 1849
Jules Armand Dufaure	2 June 1849	31 October 1849
Ferdinand Barrot	31 October 1849	15 March 1850
Jules Baroche	15 March 1850	24 January 1851
Claude-Marius Vaïsse	24 January 1851	10 April 1851
Léon Faucher	10 April 1851	26 October 1851
René de Thorigny	26 October 1851	2 December 1851
Charles Auguste, duc de Morny	2 December 1851	22 January 1852
Victor Fialin, comte de Persigny	22 January 1852	23 June 1854
Adolphe Billault	23 June 1854	7 February 1858
Charles Esprit Espinasse	7 February 1858	14 June 1858
Claude Alphonse Delangle	14 June 1858	5 May 1859
Ernest Arrighi de Casanova	5 May 1859	1 November 1859
Adolphe Billault	1 November 1859	5 December 1860
Victor Fialin, comte de Persigny	5 December 1860	23 June 1863
Paul Boudet	23 June 1863	28 March 1865
Charles, marquis de La Valette	28 March 1865	13 November 1867
Ernest Pinard	13 November 1867	17 December 1868
Adolphe Forcade La Roquette	17 December 1868	2 January 1870
Jean-Pierre Napoléon Eugène Chevandier de Valdrôme	2 January 1870	18 August 1870
Julien-Théophile-Henri Chevreau	18 August 1870	4 September 1870
Léon Gambetta	4 September 1870	6 February 1871
Emmanuel Arago	6 February 1871	19 February 1871
Ernest Picard	19 February 1871	5 June 1871
Félix Lambrecht	5 June 1871	8 October 1871
Auguste Casimir-Perier	11 October 1871	6 February 1872
Victor Lefranc	6 February 1872	7 December 1872
Eugène de Goulard	7 December 1872	18 May 1873
Auguste Casimir-Perier	18 May 1873	25 May 1873
Charles Beulé	25 May 1873	26 November 1873
Albert, duc de Broglie	26 November 1873	22 May 1874
Oscar Bardi de Fourtou	22 May 1874	20 July 1874
François, baron de Chabaud-Latour	20 July 1874	10 March 1875
Louis Buffet	10 March 1875	23 February 1876
Jules Armand Dufaure	23 February 1876	9 March 1876
Amable Ricard	9 March 1876	11 May 1876
Émile de Marcère	15 May 1876	12 December 1876
Jules Simon	12 December 1876	17 May 1877
Oscar Bardi de Fourtou	17 May 1877	23 November 1877
Charles Welche	23 November 1877	13 December 1877
Émile de Marcère	13 December 1877	4 March 1879
Charles Lepère	4 March 1879	17 May 1880
Ernest Constans	17 May 1880	14 November 1881
Pierre Waldeck-Rousseau	14 November 1881	30 January 1882
René Goblet	30 January 1882	7 August 1882
Armand Fallières	7 August 1882	21 February 1883
Pierre Waldeck-Rousseau	21 February 1883	6 April 1885
François Allain-Targé	6 April 1885	7 January 1886
Ferdinand Sarrien	7 January 1886	11 December 1886
René Goblet	11 December 1886	30 May 1877
Armand Fallières	30 May 1887	12 December 1887
Ferdinand Sarrien	12 December 1887	3 April 1888
Charles Floquet	3 April 1888	22 February 1889
Ernest Constans	22 February 1889	1 March 1890
Léon Bourgeois	1 March 1890	17 March 1890
Ernest Constans	17 March 1890	27 February 1892
Émile Loubet	27 February 1892	11 January 1893
Alexandre Ribot	11 January 1893	4 April 1893
Charles Dupuy	4 April 1893	3 December 1893
David Raynal	3 December 1893	30 May 1894
Charles Dupuy	30 May 1894	26 January 1895
Georges Leygues	26 January 1895	1 November 1895
Léon Bourgeois	1 November 1895	28 March 1896
Ferdinand Sarrien	30 March 1896	29 April 1896
Louis Barthou	29 April 1896	28 June 1898
Henri Brisson	28 June 1898	1 November 1898
Charles Dupuy	1 November 1898	22 June 1899
Pierre Waldeck-Rousseau	22 June 1899	7 June 1902
Émile Combes	7 June 1902	24 January 1905
Eugène Étienne	24 January 1905	12 November 1905
Fernand Dubief	12 November 1905	14 March 1906
Georges Clemenceau	14 March 1906	24 July 1909
Aristide Briand	24 July 1909	2 March 1911
Ernest Monis	2 March 1911	27 June 1911
Joseph Caillaux	27 June 1911	14 January 1912
Théodore Steeg	14 January 1912	21 January 1913
Aristide Briand	21 January 1913	22 March 1913
Louis Lucien Klotz	22 March 1913	9 December 1913
René Renoult	9 December 1913	17 March 1914
Louis Malvy	17 March 1914	9 June 1914
Paul Peytral	9 June 1914	13 June 1914
Louis Malvy	13 June 1914	31 August 1917
Théodore Steeg	1 September 1917	16 November 1917
Jules Pams	16 November 1917	20 January 1920
Théodore Steeg	20 January 1920	16 January 1921
Pierre Marraud	16 January 1921	15 January 1922
Maurice Maunoury	15 January 1922	29 March 1924
Justin de Selves	29 March 1924	14 June 1924
Camille Chautemps	14 June 1924	17 April 1925
Abraham Schrameck	17 April 1925	22 November 1925
Camille Chautemps	28 November 1925	9 March 1926
Louis Malvy	9 March 1926	10 April 1926
Jean Durand	10 April 1926	19 July 1926
Camille Chautemps	19 July 1926	23 July 1926
Albert Sarraut	23 July 1926	11 November 1928
André Tardieu	11 November 1928	21 February 1930
Camille Chautemps	21 February 1930	2 March 1930
André Tardieu	2 March 1930	13 December 1930
Georges Leygues	13 December 1930	27 January 1931
Pierre Laval	27 January 1931	14 January 1932
Pierre Cathala	14 January 1932	20 February 1932
Albert Mahieu	20 February 1932	3 June 1932
Camille Chautemps	3 June 1932	30 January 1934
Eugène Frot	30 January 1934	9 February 1934
Albert Sarraut	9 February 1934	13 October 1934
Paul Marchandeau	13 October 1934	8 November 1934
Marcel Régnier	8 November 1934	1 June 1935
Fernand Bouisson	1 June 1935	7 June 1935
Joseph Paganon	7 June 1935	24 January 1936
Albert Sarraut	24 January 1936	4 June 1936
Roger Salengro	4 June 1936	18 November 1936
Marx Dormoy	24 November 1936	18 January 1938
Albert Sarraut	18 January 1938	13 March 1938
Marx Dormoy	13 March 1938	10 April 1938
Albert Sarraut	10 April 1938	21 March 1940
Henri Roy	21 March 1940	18 May 1940
Georges Mandel	18 May 1940	16 June 1940
Charles Pomaret	16 June 1940	26 June 1940
Adrien Marquet	27 June 1940	6 September 1940
Marcel Peyrouton	6 September 1940	14 February 1941
François Darlan	14 February 1941	18 July 1941
Pierre Pucheu	18 July 1941	18 April 1942
Pierre Laval	18 April 1942	19 August 1944
Free French Commissioners
André Diethelm	24 September 1941	28 July 1942
André Philip	28 July 1942	9 November 1943
Emmanuel d'Astier de la Vigerie	9 November 1943	10 September 1944
Ministers
Adrien Tixier	10 September 1944	26 January 1946
André Le Troquer	26 January 1946	24 June 1946
Édouard Depreux	24 June 1946	24 November 1947
Jules Moch	24 November 1947	7 February 1950
Henri Queuille	7 February 1950	11 August 1951
Charles Brune	11 August 1951	28 June 1953
Léon Martinaud-Deplat	28 June 1953	19 June 1954
François Mitterrand	19 June 1954	23 February 1955
Maurice Bourgès-Maunoury	23 February 1955	1 December 1955
Edgar Faure	1 December 1955	1 February 1956
Jean Gilbert-Jules	1 February 1956	6 November 1957
Maurice Bourgès-Maunoury	6 November 1957	14 May 1958
Maurice Faure	14 May 1958	17 May 1958
Jules Moch	17 May 1958	1 June 1958
Émile Pelletier	1 June 1958	8 January 1959
Jean Berthoin	8 January 1959	28 May 1959
Pierre Chatenet	28 May 1959	6 May 1961
Roger Frey	6 May 1961	6 April 1967
Christian Fouchet	6 April 1967	30 May 1968
Raymond Marcellin	30 May 1968	27 February 1974
Jacques Chirac	27 February 1974	28 May 1974
Michel Poniatowski	28 May 1974	30 March 1977
Christian Bonnet	30 March 1977	22 May 1981
Gaston Defferre	22 May 1981	19 July 1984
Pierre Joxe	19 July 1984	20 March 1986
Charles Pasqua	20 March 1986	12 May 1988
Pierre Joxe	12 May 1988	29 January 1991
Philippe Marchand	29 January 1991	2 April 1992
Paul Quilès	2 April 1992	29 March 1993
Charles Pasqua	29 March 1993	18 May 1995
Jean-Louis Debré	18 May 1995	4 June 1997
Jean-Pierre Chevènement	4 June 1997	29 August 2000
Daniel Vaillant	29 August 2000	7 May 2002
Nicolas Sarkozy	7 May 2002	31 March 2004
Dominique de Villepin	31 March 2004	31 May 2005
Nicolas Sarkozy	31 May 2005	26 March 2007
François Baroin	26 March 2007	15 May 2007
Michèle Alliot-Marie	18 May 2007	23 June 2009
Brice Hortefeux	23 June 2009	27 February 2011
Claude Guéant	27 February 2011	16 May 2012
Manuel Valls	16 May 2012	31 March 2014
Bernard Cazeneuve	31 March 2014	6 December 2016
Bruno Le Roux	6 December 2016	21 March 2017
Matthias Fekl	21 March 2017	17 May 2017
Gérard Collomb	17 May 2017	3 October 2018
Édouard Philippe	3 October 2018	16 October 2018
Christophe Castaner	16 October 2018	6 July 2020
Gérald Darmanin	6 July 2020	21 September 2024
Bruno Retailleau	21 September 2024	12 October 2025
Laurent Nuñez	12 October 2025	Present

== See also ==
- List of prime ministers of France
- List of foreign ministers of France
- Politics of France
