= Broyes =

Broyes is the name or part of the name of the following communes in France:

- Broyes, Marne, in the Marne department
- Broyes, Oise, in the Oise department
- Saint-Remy-sous-Broyes, in the Marne department
