= Rieux =

Rieux is the name or part of the name of several communes in France:

- Rieux, Marne, in the Marne department
- Rieux, Morbihan, in the Morbihan department
- Rieux, Oise, in the Oise department
- Rieux, Seine-Maritime, in the Seine-Maritime department
- Rieux-de-Pelleport, in the Ariège department
- Rieux-en-Cambrésis, in the Nord department
- Rieux-en-Val, in the Aude department
- Rieux-Minervois, in the Aude department
- Rieux-Volvestre, formerly Rieux, in the Haute-Garonne department
