= Maximilien Radix de Sainte-Foix =

Maximilien Radix de Sainte-Foix, born Charles-Pierre-Maximilien Radix de Sainte-Foix (13 June 1736 in Paris – 23 June 1810 in Bourbonne-les-Bains), was a French financier and politician. He held the position of Superintendent of Finance for the Comte d'Artois. Later, he headed the secret council of advisers for Louis XVI, while the latter was being detained at the Tuileries Palace. He played a big role in the counter-revolutionary circles of the time.

== During the ancien régime ==
Charles-Pierre Maximilien Radix de Sainte-Foix was the son of Claude Mathieu Radix and Mary Elizabeth Denis. He is the brother of Marie Geneviève Radix de Sainte-Foy.

In 1759, he started his career as a diplomat, having been named attaché at the French embassy in Vienna. In 1764 he was appointed Treasurer of the Navy, a highly lucrative position where many of his contemporaries have made considerable fortunes.

Summoned to Versailles in 1776 to perform the duties of Superintendent of Finance for the Comte d'Artois, he apparently had no difficulty in raising the huge for the time amount of 300,000 livres, that was believed to have been the required payoff to obtain this position.

The Comte d'Artois was the youngest of the three sons of Louis, Dauphin of France (son of Louis XV) and Marie Leszczyńska and, unlike his two brothers Louis XVI and the future Louis XVIII, was inclined for the most part to easy and expensive pleasures, while reluctant to engage in reading and reflection. Radix de Sainte-Foix, as an accomplished courtier, catered to his desires.

Radix had a long affair with the beautiful and intelligent Mary Frances Henrietta Lachs (de Saint-Albin). She served as his courier in communications between Paris and London. With the help of comte d’Artois, he acquired considerable amounts of real estate in Paris.

He was accused in 1780 by Jacques Necker of embezzling five million livres entrusted to him by the Comte d'Artois, but his arrest was not ordered until September 6, 1782. Having been alerted about it, he escaped to London with Miss de Saint-Albin.

At the very time - just after the fall of Bastille - when the comte d’Artois was escaping from France, Radix de Sainte-Foix arrived from London to Paris.

Soon he was well received by the Duke of Orleans, and was active in his salons where he rubbed shoulders with Choderlos de Laclos, Nathaniel Parker Forth and Bertrand Barère. He also got in touch with various members of his family, including his nephew Antoine Omer Talon, and the young lawyer Huguet de Semonville who were both happy to serve him.

== Louis XVI in the Tuileries ==
From 1791 onwards, Montmorin, Minister of Foreign Affairs, started to organize resistance to the progress of the Revolution; he thought that Radix de Sainte-Foix had the right financial and various other skills for this sort of business.

And so, the funds of the Civil List (la Liste civile), voted annually by the National Assembly were partially assigned to secret expenses. These were the considerable amounts of money traditionally assigned to the princes' expenses. It was the idea of Mirabeau to use them to preserve the constitutional monarchy.

Arnault Laporte was in charge of the Civil List and he collaborated with both Montmorin and Mirabeau. After the death of the latter, Radix de Sainte-Foix took his place in trying to manipulate the course of the Revolution with money.

It was Radix who encouraged Louis XVI to place Dumouriez into the Ministry of Foreign Affairs to replace Valdec Lessart. Radix was so convincing that Louis XVI never had any doubts that his commitment to the good cause was sincere. The king, who had no overall strategy, often seemed to place his trust in people who did not really deserve it.

At the beginning of the Revolution, Radix was selling some of his Paris properties in order to acquire great estates in the provinces, that were then being sold off as biens nationaux. These were highly successful speculative investments that he acquired at low cost. Thus, for example, he purchased the Château de Neuilly, located at Neuilly-sur-Seine, but early in 1792 sold it to Madame de Montesson.

He placed most of his funds in England and, in 1792, lived modestly in a large apartment - part of the arcades of the Palais-Royal. He shared this apartment with Geoffroy Seiffert, a former doctor, and one of the co-founders of the Jacobin Club. At his apartment, he entertained such regulars as Dumouriez, Talleyrand, Ivan Simolin (Russian ambassador to France), Montmorin, Rayneval, and the General Biron. Thus, he was able to interest some popular leaders such as Georges Danton in the money from the Civil List; the benefit of it all, as history proved, was rather poor.

== Radix taken to account ==
There were very few members of the National Convention who, during the trial of Louis XVI, were ignorant of the role played by Radix de Sainte-Foix and of the revelations that he could provide. In view of the documents found in the armoire de fer, at the request of the Girondins, it was decreed that he should be arrested, and explain himself in court.

He was interrogated on Feb. 27, 1793 at the Criminal Court in Paris by Philippe Rühl, a friend of Danton, with the inquest being chaired by Jules-François Paré, Danton's former clerk. Yet the testimony of Bertrand Barère helped to acquit him. In his memoirs published long after these events, Barère tells that it was Dumouriez who pressured him to intervene on behalf of Radix. In truth, Barère had everything to fear from the possible revelations from Radix.

Radix was nonetheless sentenced to house arrest; he remained there only until next June.

It was Robespierre who decided to call him to account once again; now he was accused of conspiring with the Austrians. But, again, his protectors (Barère, Alexis Vadier and the Committee of General Security) intervened to prevent him from being tried by the Revolutionary Tribunal. On 7 Pluviôse II, he was allowed to move to la maison de santé Belhomme - a prison and private clinic.

On 18 Vendémiaire III (9 October 1794), he was finally sent to be tried by the Revolutionary Tribunal, but on 3 Brumaire III (24 October 1794), he was acquitted.

Released from prison, he waited for the next opportunity to engage in politics. Later on, Talleyrand, his old friend and accomplice, again used his services, along with others such as Jean-Frédéric Perregaux, a Swiss banker living in Paris.
