= Nicolas François de Neufchâteau =

French statesman (1750–1828)

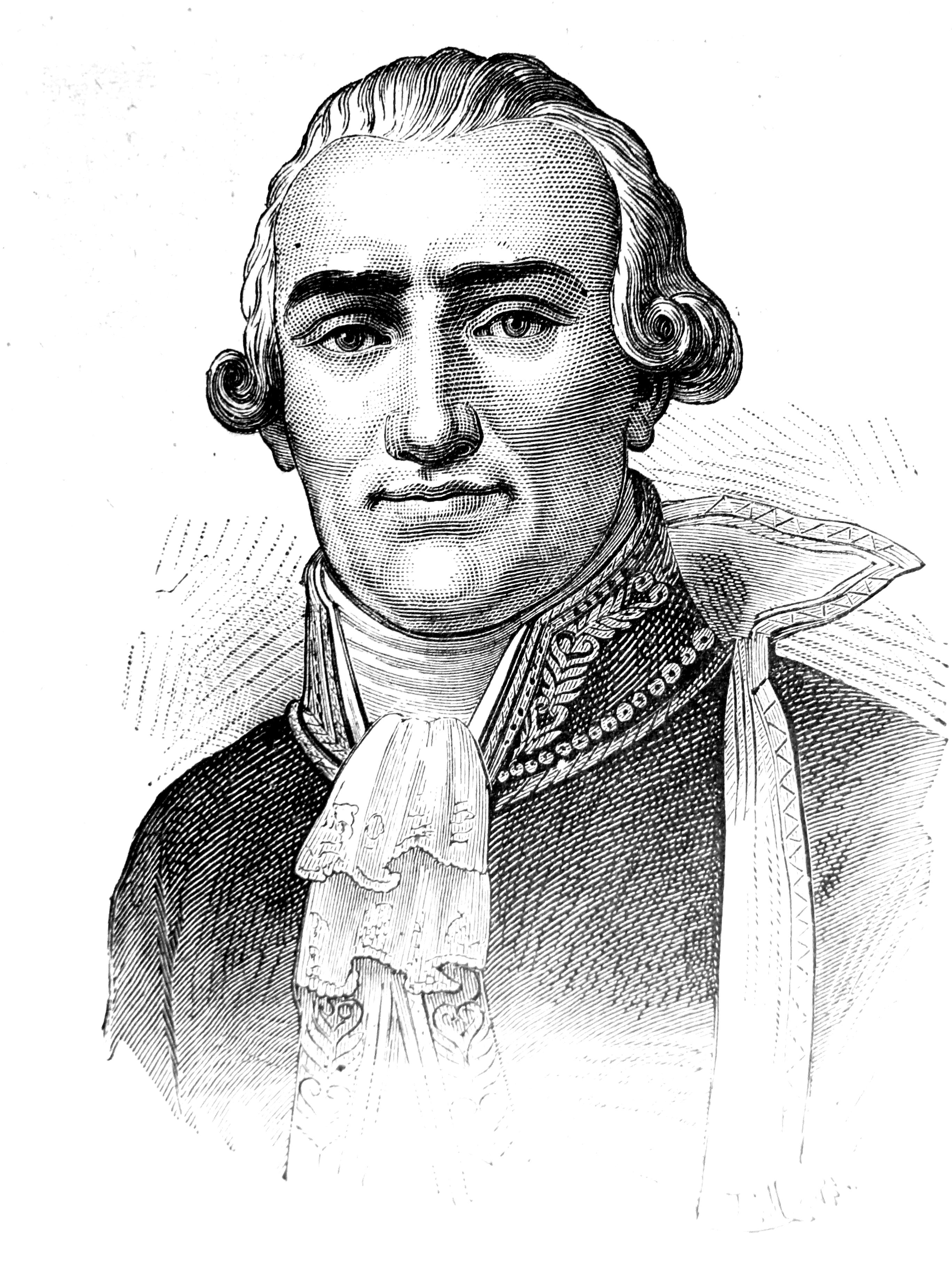
- Engraving modeled after a portrait by Jean-Baptiste Isabey, 1798

President of Conservative Senate
- In office 19 May 1804 – 19 May 1806
- Preceded by: Louis-Nicolas Lemercier
- Succeeded by: Gaspard Monge

Minister of the Interior
- In office 17 June 1798 – 22 June 1799
- Preceded by: François Sébastien Letourneux
- Succeeded by: Nicolas Marie Quinette
- In office 15 July 1797 – 13 September 1797
- Preceded by: Pierre Bénézech
- Succeeded by: François Sébastien Letourneux

Member of the Directory
- In office 9 September 1797 – 23 April 1798
- Preceded by: François Barthélemy
- Succeeded by: Jean-Baptiste Treilhard

President of the Legislative Assembly
- In office 26 December 1791 – 6 January 1792
- Preceded by: Pierre-Édouard Lémontey
- Succeeded by: Jean Antoine d'Averhoult

Personal details
- Born: 17 April 1750 Saffais, Meurthe-et-Moselle, Duchy of Lorraine
- Died: 10 January 1828 (aged 77) Paris, Kingdom of France
- Education: College of Neufchâteau

Nicolas François, known as François de Neufchâteau (French pronunciation: [fʁɑ̃swa d(ə) nœfʃɑto, - nøʃɑto]; 17 April 1750 – 10 January 1828), was a French statesman, poet, and agricultural scientist.

== Biography ==
=== Early years ===
Born on 17 April 1750 in Saffais, in Meurthe-et-Moselle, the son of a schoolteacher, he studied at the College of Neufchâteau in the Vosges. At the age of fourteen, he published a volume of poetry which obtained the interest of Jean-Jacques Rousseau and Voltaire. When only sixteen, he was elected member of some of the main academies of France. In 1783 he was named procureur-général to the council of Saint Domingue. He had previously been engaged on a translation of Ariosto, which he finished before his return to France five years afterwards, but it was destroyed in a shipwreck during his voyage home.

=== Revolution ===
During the French Revolution, Neufchâteau was elected deputy supplant to the National Assembly, charged with the organization of the département of the Vosges, and elected later to the Legislative Assembly, of which he first became secretary and then president. In 1793 he was imprisoned on account of his play Paméla ou la vertu récompensée (Théâtre de la Nation, 1 August 1793). His play had been denounced by Collot d'Herbois because lines spoken about persecution could easily be interpreted as criticism of the ruling faction and the entire cast was arrested along with him on 2 September. He was released the following year with the start of the Thermidorian Reaction.

=== Directory and Napoleon ===
In 1797, he became Minister of the Interior, distinguishing himself by his thorough administration. It is Neufchâteau who initiated the French system of inland navigation. He inaugurated the museum of the Louvre and was one of the promoters of the Exposition des produits de l'industrie française, the first universal exhibition of industrial products. He replaced Lazare Carnot as a member of the French Directory, a position he held between 9 September 1797, and 23 April 1798.

From 19 May 1804 to 19 May 1806 he was president of the Conservative Senate, coinciding with the establishment of the First Empire — his office implied that he was the one to solicit Napoleon Bonaparte to assume the title of Emperor. In 1803, he was admitted to the Académie Française, and in 1808 he received the dignity of count. Retiring from public life in 1814, after the Bourbon Restoration, he occupied himself chiefly with the study of agriculture until his death.

== Death ==
He died in Paris on 10 January 1828.

== Works ==
Neufchâteau had multiple accomplishments, and interested himself in a great variety of subjects, but his fame rests mostly on what he did as a statesman for the encouragement and development of the industries of France. His late poetical productions are not judged to be as original as his youth oeuvre. He was a noted grammarian and literary critic, as is witnessed by his editions of the Lettres provinciales and Pensées of Blaise Pascal (Paris, 1822 and 1826) and Alain-René Lesage's Gil Blas (Paris, 1820). He was also the author of a large number of works on agriculture.

== Bibliography ==
- Poésies diverses de deux amis, ou Pièces fugitives (1768)
- Ode sur les parlements (1771)
- Nouveaux Contes moraux (1781)
- Les études du magistrat. Discours prononcé à la rentrée du Conseil supérieur du Cap, le jeudi 5 octobre 1786 (1786)
- Mémoire en forme de discours sur la disette du numéraire a Saint-Domingue, et sur les moyens d'y remédier (1788)
- Lettre de N. François (de Neufchateau), juge-de-paix à Vicherai, président du département des Vosges, aux citoyens cultivateurs de ce département, pour leur proposer d'essayer une manière plus facile & plus économique de recueillir les grains, avec des observations importantes sur les semailles (1793)
- Les Vosges (1796)
- Paméla, ou La vertu récompensée, Comédie en cinq actes en vers (1799)
- Le ministre de l'interieur, aux administration centrales de departement (1799)
- Lettre sur le robinier, connu sous le nom impropre de faux acacia. Avec plusieurs pièces relatives à la culture et aux usages de cet abre (1803)
- Tableau des vues que se propose la politique anglaise dans toutes les parties du monde, suivi d'un coup-d'oeil historique sur les résultats des pricipeaux traités entre La France et l'Angleterre aant le traité d'Amiens (1804)
- Histoire de l'occupation de la Bavière par les autrichiens, en 1778 et 1779 (1806)
- Fables et contes (1814)
- Les Tropes, ou les figures de mots, poème en quatre chants (1817)
- Essai sur la langue françoise, et particulièrement sur les provinciales et sur les pensées de Pascal (1818)

== See also ==
- Les Neuf Sœurs

== Notes ==
Political offices
Preceded by Pierre Bénézech	Minister of the Interior; 16 July 1797 – 14 September 1797	Succeeded by François Sébastien Letourneux
Preceded by François Sébastien Letourneux	Minister of the Interior; 17 June 1798 – 22 June 1799	Succeeded by Nicolas Marie Quinette
Academic offices
Preceded by Aimar-Charles-Marie de Nicolaï	Seat 2 Académie française 1803–1828	Succeeded by Pierre-Antoine Lebrun
