= Mourgue =

Mourgue is a surname. Notable people with the surname include:

- Arthur Mourgue (born 1999), French rugby player
- Cécilia Mourgue d'Algue (née Perslow) (born 1946), French-Swedish golfer
- Gaëtan Mourgue d'Algue (born 1939), French golfer
- Jacques Augustin Mourgue (1734–1818), French politician
- Olivier Mourgue (born 1939), French industrial designer
- Pierre Mourgue (1890–1969), French fashion illustrator and lithographer
