= Armoire de fer =

King's safe at the Tuileries

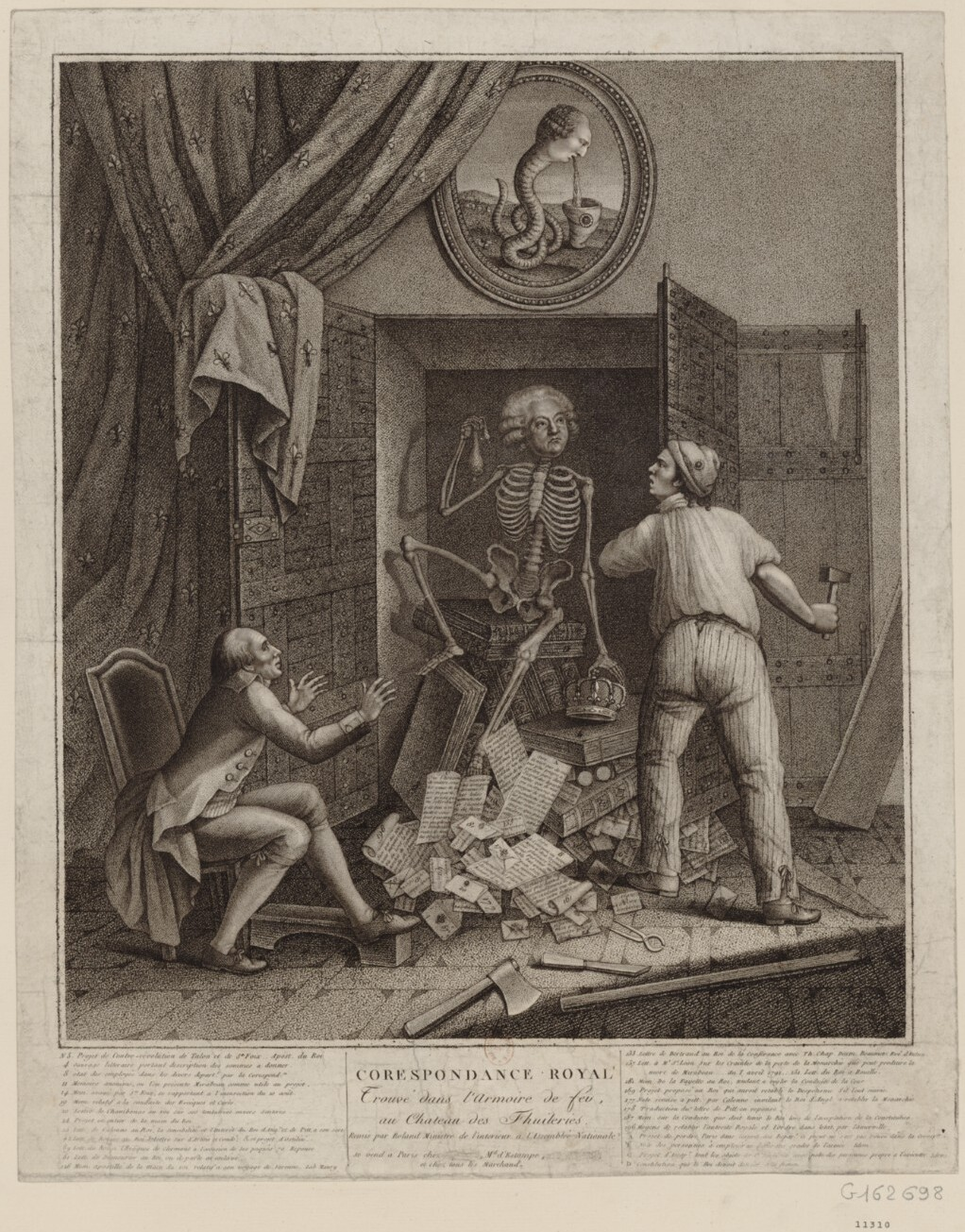
1792 caricature of Mirabeau's skeleton coming out of Louis XVI's armoire de fer

Armoire de fer (French: 'iron chest') refers to an iron container used to house important documents. A notable and frequent use of the term refers to a hiding place at the apartments of Louis XVI at the Tuileries Palace where some secret documents were kept. The existence of this iron cabinet, hidden behind wooden panelling, was publicly revealed in November 1792 to Jean-Marie Roland, vicomte de la Platière, Girondin Minister of the Interior.

== History ==
A locksmith by the name of François Gamain helped reveal these documents to the authorities, who rewarded him with a government pension. The cabinet hid correspondence between Louis XVI and, among others, Mirabeau, whose venality and duplicity were exposed. Also, the cabinet included the correspondence of the King with the financier Maximilien Radix de Sainte-Foix, an important secret advisor of the sovereign; with the bankers Joseph Duruey, and Tourteau de Septeuil; with Arnaud Laporte, a Royalist government minister who controlled large funds of money during the revolution; with François de Bonal, Bishop of Clermont, et al.

Most of the pieces of correspondence in the cabinet involved ministers of Louis XVI, including Armand Marc, comte de Montmorin, Claude Antoine de Valdec de Lessart, Bertrand de Molleville, Louis, comte de Narbonne-Lara, Cahier de Gerville, and Charles François Dumouriez.

Other letters involved prominent figures of the Revolution, such as General Antoine Joseph Santerre, Lafayette, Antoine Rivarol, and Charles Maurice de Talleyrand-Périgord. There were rumors that only selected documents were made public, and that certain other documents were destroyed. The Interior Minister Roland would have played a role in this regard, and may have destroyed documents involving his colleague Danton.

== Aftermath ==
After the discovery of the armoire de fer, Mirabeau's remains were removed from the Panthéon. On 20 November 1792, Jean-Marie Roland filed these archives—at least what was left of them (which was considerable)—with the office of the National Convention, negating all maneuvers to prevent putting Louis XVI on trial. By the order of the Convention of 6 December 1792, many of these documents were published by the national printing office in 1792–1793.
