= Jules-François Paré =

French politician

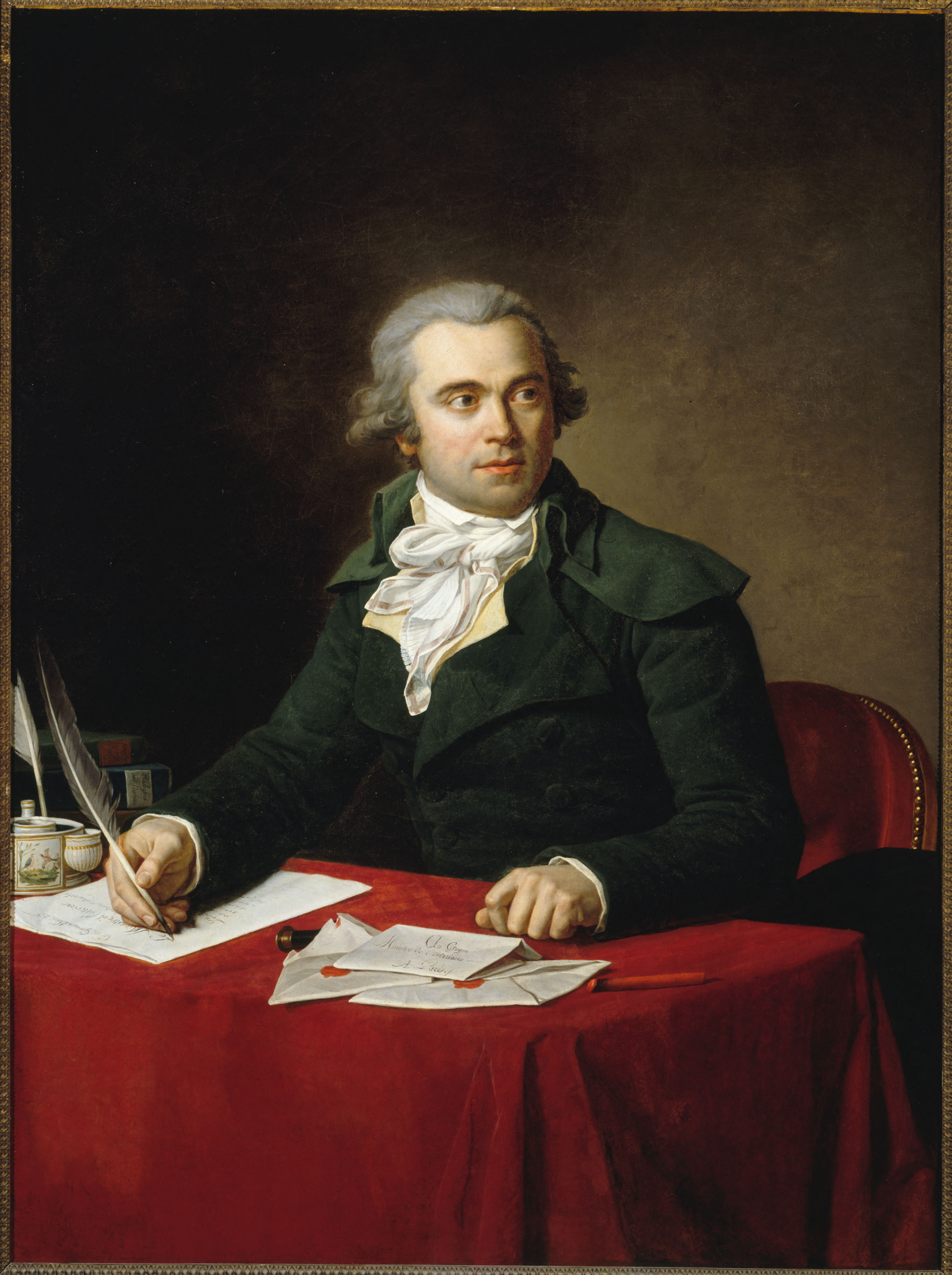
Portrait by Jean-Louis Laneuville, 1795

Jules François Paré (11 August 1755 – 29 July 1819) was a French politician who served as Minister of the Interior from 1793 to 1794, during the French Revolution.

== Life ==
Paré was born in Rieux, Champagne on 11 August 1755 into a modest family. His father, a carpenter, could only afford him a primary education. He attended the Collège des Oratoriens in Troyes. When he was to have his hands rapped as punishment, his classmate and friend Georges Danton defended him and spoke out against corporal punishment in class. Danton spoke so persuasively that the head of the school decided to ban the practice.

Paré became the chief clerk at Danton's law office in Paris. On the outbreak of the Revolution, Paré embraced its principles with moderation and, thanks to his employer's support, received the post of departmental commissioner and was elected secretary to the Provisional Executive Council in 1793. On 20 August 1793 he was made Minister of the Interior in replacement of Dominique Joseph Garat. Denounced as a "new Roland" by François-Nicolas Vincent and Jacques René Hébert and as a "Dantoniste" by Georges Couthon, he was dismissed on 5 April 1794, but escaped punishment, particularly the guillotine which awaited his protector.

Under the Directory, Paré was appointed commissioner to the Seine department and then administrator of military hospitals. He withdrew from politics during the First French Empire and retired to a small property in Champagne. Paré died in Paris on 29 July 1819.

Political offices
Preceded by Dominique Joseph Garat	Minister of the Interior; 20 August 1793 – 5 April 1794	Succeeded by Jean Marie Claude Alexandre Goujon
