= Allemant =

Allemant may refer to the following places in France:

- Allemant, Aisne, a commune in the department of Aisne
- Allemant, Marne, a commune in the department of Marne
