= Dominique Joseph Garat =

French Basque writer, lawyer, journalist, philosopher and politician

Dominique-Joseph Garat
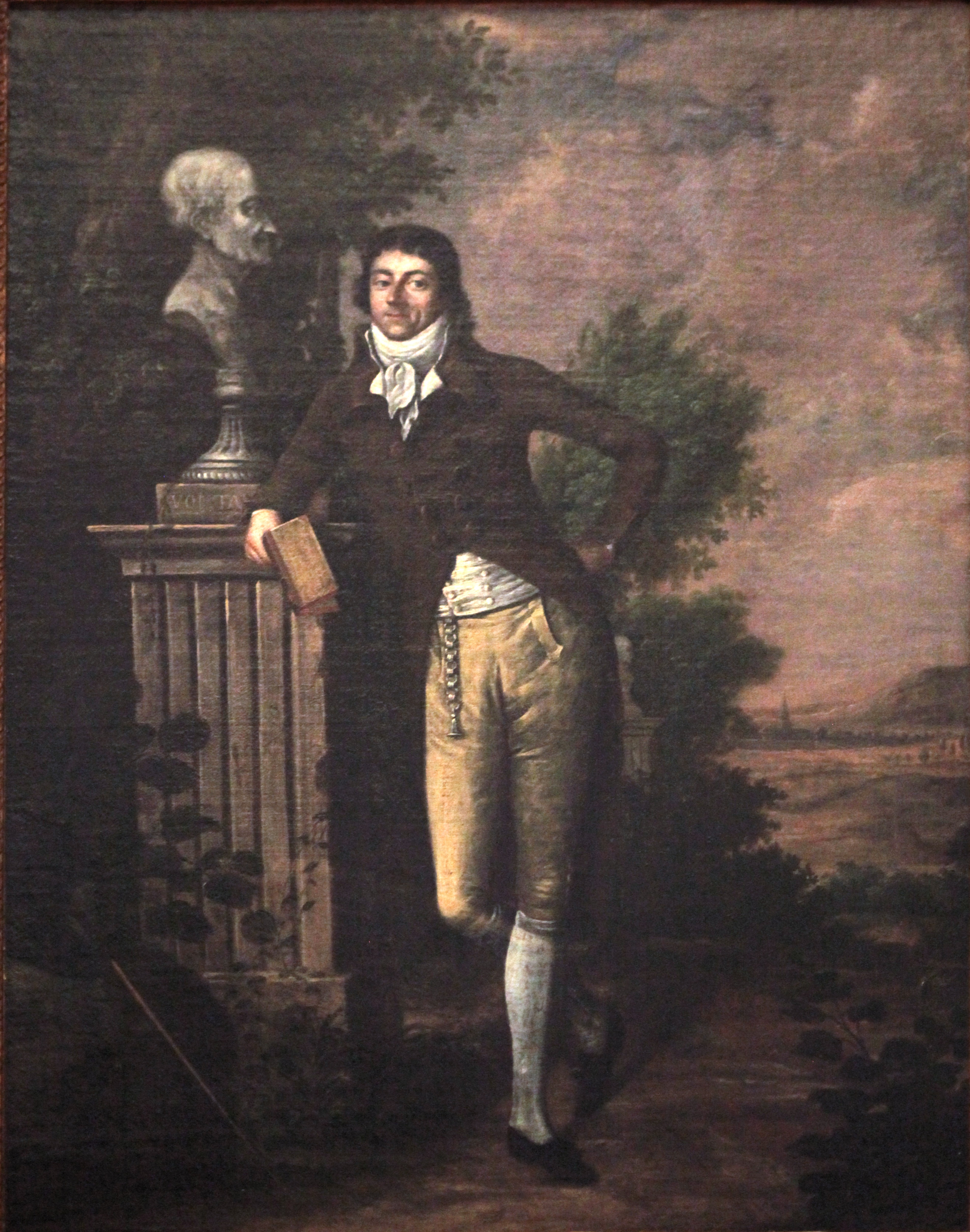
- Portrait of Garat (Musée de la Révolution française)
- Born: 8 September 1749; Ustaritz near Bayonne, France
- Died: 9 December 1833 (aged 84); Ustaritz near Bayonne, France

Signature
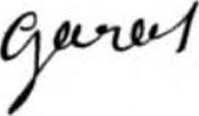

Dominique Joseph Garat (French: [dɔminik ʒozɛf ɡaʁa]; 8 September 1749 – 9 December 1833) was a French Basque writer, lawyer, journalist, philosopher and politician.

== Biography ==
Garat was born at Bayonne, in the French Basque Country. After a good education under the direction of a relation who was a curé, and a period as an advocate at Bordeaux, he came to Paris, where he obtained introductions to the most distinguished writers of the time, and became a contributor to the Encyclopedie méthodique and the Mercure de France. He gained a reputation by an éloge on Michel de l'Hôpital in 1778, and was afterwards crowned three times by the Académie française for éloges on Suger, Montausier and Fontenelle. In 1785 he was named professor of history at the Lycée, where his lectures were as popular as those of Jean-François de La Harpe (Note: Encyclopædia Britannica refers to La Harpe as "G. F. LaHarpe", but this clearly refers to Jean-François.) on literature.

Elected as a deputy to the Estates-General in 1789, Garat rendered important service to the popular cause by his narrative of the proceedings of the Assembly, in the Journal de Paris. His elder brother, Dominique (1735–1799), with whom he is sometimes confused, was also a deputy to the states-general. Georges Danton named him minister of justice in 1792, and in this capacity entrusted to him what he called the commission affreuse of communicating to King Louis XVI his sentence of death. In 1793 Garat became minister of the interior, in which position he proved quite inefficient. Though himself uncorrupt, he overlooked the most scandalous corruption in his subordinates, and in spite of a detective service which kept him accurately informed of every movement in the capital, he failed to maintain order.

At last, disgusted with the excesses which he had been unable to control, he resigned on 20 August 1793. On 2 October he was arrested for Girondist sympathies but soon released, and he escaped further molestation owing to the friendship of Barras and, more especially, of Robespierre. On the 9th Thermidor, however, he took sides against Robespierre, and on 12 September 1794 he was named by the convention as a member of the executive committee of public instruction.

== Last representative of Labourd and Basque autonomist ==
He was elected along with his brother Dominique, dubbed the Old, to be representative of Labourd (Biltzar or Assembly of Ustaritz) in Paris for the third estate on the strength of certain diplomatic gains achieved for Labourd before King Louis XVI. When French Revolution broke out in Paris, both brothers attended the last Third Estate session turned into National Assembly (1790). He was confronted with traumatic decisions regarding a makeover of the institutional reality in Labourd. Up to that point the Basque province was ruled according to its native, foral system. Like the other Basque representatives, he was overwhelmed by the clean sweep proposal for all French administrations, but eventually voted in favour persuaded that it could give him and other Basque representatives a say in future institutional decisions. He was bitterly criticized and even disenfranchised back by the Assembly of Ustaritz for his vote.

In 1790 and 1791, Joseph delivered outstanding addresses in the National Assembly defending before a hostile audience the Basque particularism and a Basque department. Despite his oratory skills that drew Napoleon Bonaparte's attention, the assembly passed a new French institutional design for France with a complete disregard to different institutional make-ups or identities, including the Assembly of Labourd (the Biltzar), whose democratic nature Garat defended.

In the following years (1793–1795) reports of over-zeal and abuses committed against the Basques of Labourd and Gipuzkoa got to Garat, who received the news with great dismay. The crimes taking place during the period of the War of the Pyrenees, included mass deportation of civilians and property seizures in Labourd, ordered by the Republican authorities in Bayonne, spearheaded by Jean-Baptiste Cavaignac and Jacques Pinet, whom Garat despised.

The senator Garat got in contact with Bonaparte in Paris, and Garat was commissioned by him both during his tenure as First Consul and Emperor with several reports on the institutional make-up, historic roots and economic assets of the Basque Country. Garat went on to elaborate a blueprint for the creation of a cross-border Basque principality attached to France (to be called New Phoenicia, after the alleged kinship of Basque and Phoenician). This new territory would include two or three districts, namely the present-day Basque Autonomous Community ("Biscay"), Navarre, and French Basque Country.

However, the new French Emperor postponed any decision in that direction. The Constitution of Bayonne signed at the Castle of Marracq in that town in June 1808 prioritized an understanding with officials in Madrid and included the Southern Basque Country—Biscay and Navarre—in Spain, but left open the debate over its separate status.

On 5 February 1809, after a plot was discovered to overthrow Bonaparte, Garat was summoned to his presence after the senator's delivery of a speech fraught with flattery to him. Dominique Joseph Garat was actually involved in the conspiracy, but he was not detained, he was required to retreat back into his home town of Ustaritz. The project of New Phoenicia was stalled, but as war events in Spain wore on the French Emperor opted for the attachment of all territories between the river Ebro and the Pyrenees to France (1810), divided into Catalonia, Aragon, Navarre, and Biscay. Any institutional alterations to these districts were ultimately overridden by military concerns on the ground.

After Garat's failure to progress in politics, he showed a deep concern in defending his determined effort to save Basque institutions and identity at all times, going on to write an essay published posthumously in 1869 with a summary of his views on the origins of the Basques, the Origines des Basques de France et d'Espagne.

== Works ==
His works include, besides those already mentioned, Considérations sur la Révolution françoise, et sur la conjuration des puissances de l'Europe, contre la liberté et contre les droits des hommes, ou, Examen de la proclamation des gouverneurs des Pays-Bas (1792); Mémoire sur la Révolution, ou exposé de ma conduite (1795, in 1797 translated as: Memoirs of the revolution; or, an apology for my conduct, in the public employments which I have held); Mémoires historiques sur le XVIIIe siècle, et sur M. Suard. Tome I; Tome II, Eloge funèbre de Joubert, commandant en chef de l'armée d'Italie : prononcé au Champ-de-Mars le 30 fructidor an 7, Éloge funèbre des généraux Kléber et Desaix : prononcé le 1er. vendém. an 9, à la place des Victoires; several notices of distinguished persons; and a large number of articles in periodicals.

=== Further writings ===
- 1792 - Discours de Dominique-Joseph Garat, ministre de la justice, a la Convention nationale
- 1793 - Discours du ministre de la justice, prononcé lors de son acceptation du ministère de l'Intérieur, le 15 mars 1793, l'an deuxième de la République
- 1799 - Discours prononcé par Garat après la lecture du message sur l'assassinat des ministres à Rastadt. Séance du 16 floréal an 7
- 1799 Rapport fait par Garat sur la résolution du 29 prairial an 7, relative aux délits de la presse. Séance du 23 messidor an 7
- 1862 - Mémoires de Garat
- 1869 - Origines des Basques de France et d'Espagne

== See also ==
- Les Neuf Sœurs
- End of Basque home rule in France

== Notes ==
Political offices
Preceded by Georges Jacques Danton	Minister of Justice; 1792–1793	Succeeded by Louis Gohier
Preceded by Jean-Marie Roland de la Platière	Minister of the Interior; 23 January 1793 – 20 August 1793	Succeeded by Jules-François Paré
