= Joseph Delaunay =

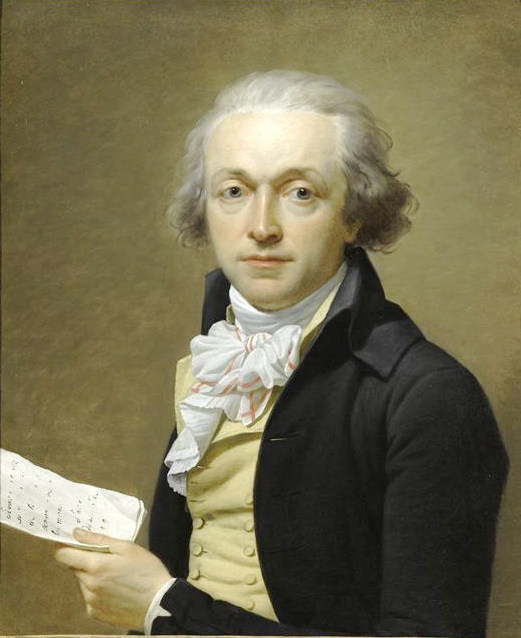
Joseph Delaunay, by Jean-Louis Laneuville.

Joseph Delaunay (24 December 1752, Angers – 5 April 1794, Paris) was a French deputy.

He was national commissar at the Tribunal of Angers and, in 1791, he was elected as a deputy to the Legislative Assembly by the département of Maine-et-Loire. In 1792, he was re-elected as deputy to the National Convention by the same département. He was tried for corruption in the affair of the liquidation of the Compagnie des Indes Orientales, condemned to death and guillotined on 16 germinal year II (5 April 1794).

== Sources ==
- Histoire de la Révolution française by Jules Michelet
