= Étienne de Joly =

French Freemason and politician (1756–1837)

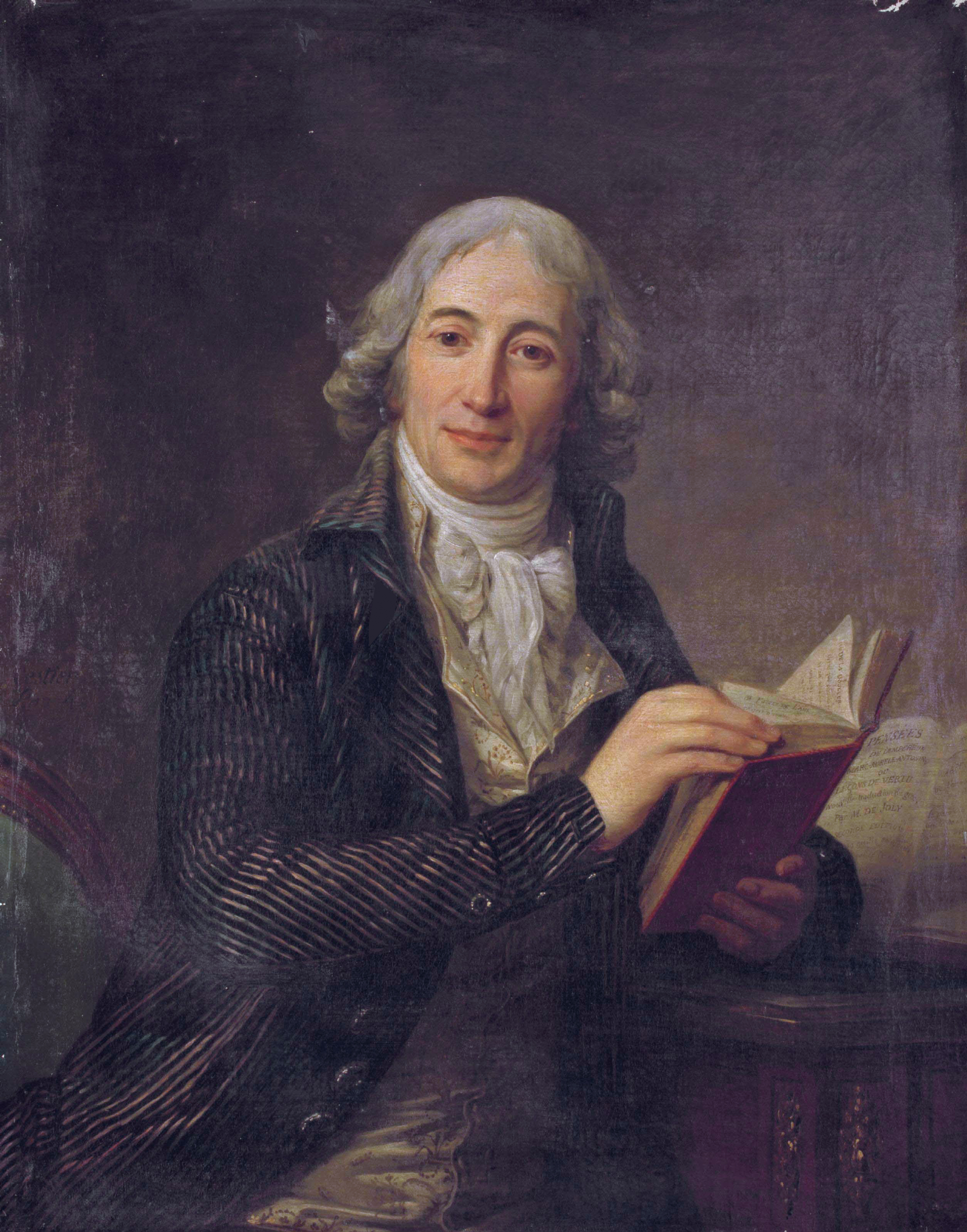
- Portrait by Antoine Vestier, c. 1796

Minister of Justice
- In office 4 July 1792 – 10 August 1792
- Preceded by: Antoine Duranton
- Succeeded by: Georges Jacques Danton

Minister of Interior
- In office 17 July 1792 – 21 July 1792
- Preceded by: Antoine René
- Succeeded by: Clément Felix Champion de Villeneuve

Mayor of Créteil
- In office 1815–1815
- Preceded by: Louis-Simon Piot
- Succeeded by: Louis Alexandre Delorme
- In office 1819–1831
- Preceded by: Jean-Baptiste Forestier
- Succeeded by: Simon Claude Lecouteux

Personal details
- Born: Étienne Louis Hector de Joly; 22 April 1756 Montpellier, France
- Died: 3 April 1837 (aged 80) Paris, France
- Awards: Chevalier of the Legion of Honour

Étienne Louis Hector de Joly (22 April 1756 – 3 April 1837) was a French Freemason and politician. He was minister of the interior and minister of justice in the Constitutional Cabinet of Louis XVI.

== Bibliography ==
- Georges Bordonove, Louis XVII et l'énigme du Temple, 1995
- Alain Decaux, Louis XVII retrouvé, Perrin, 1947
- Gruau, dit de la Barre, Louis XVII, Intrigues dévoilées (Consultable en ligne)
- Dejoly, Étienne-Louis-Hector : Mémoires inédits de E.-L.-H. Dejoly sur la journée du 10 août 1792, Édition critique avec une introduction et des notes par Jacques Godechot, Paris, Presses universitaires de France ; (Nancy, impr. de G. Thomas), 1947.

| Preceded by Antoine-Marie-René de Terrier de Monciel | Minister of the Interior of France; 1792 | Succeeded by Clément Felix Champion de Villeneuve |
| Preceded by Antoine Duranton | Minister of Justice of France; 1792 | Succeeded by Georges Jacques Danton |
