= Saint-Remy-sous-Broyes =

- Commune
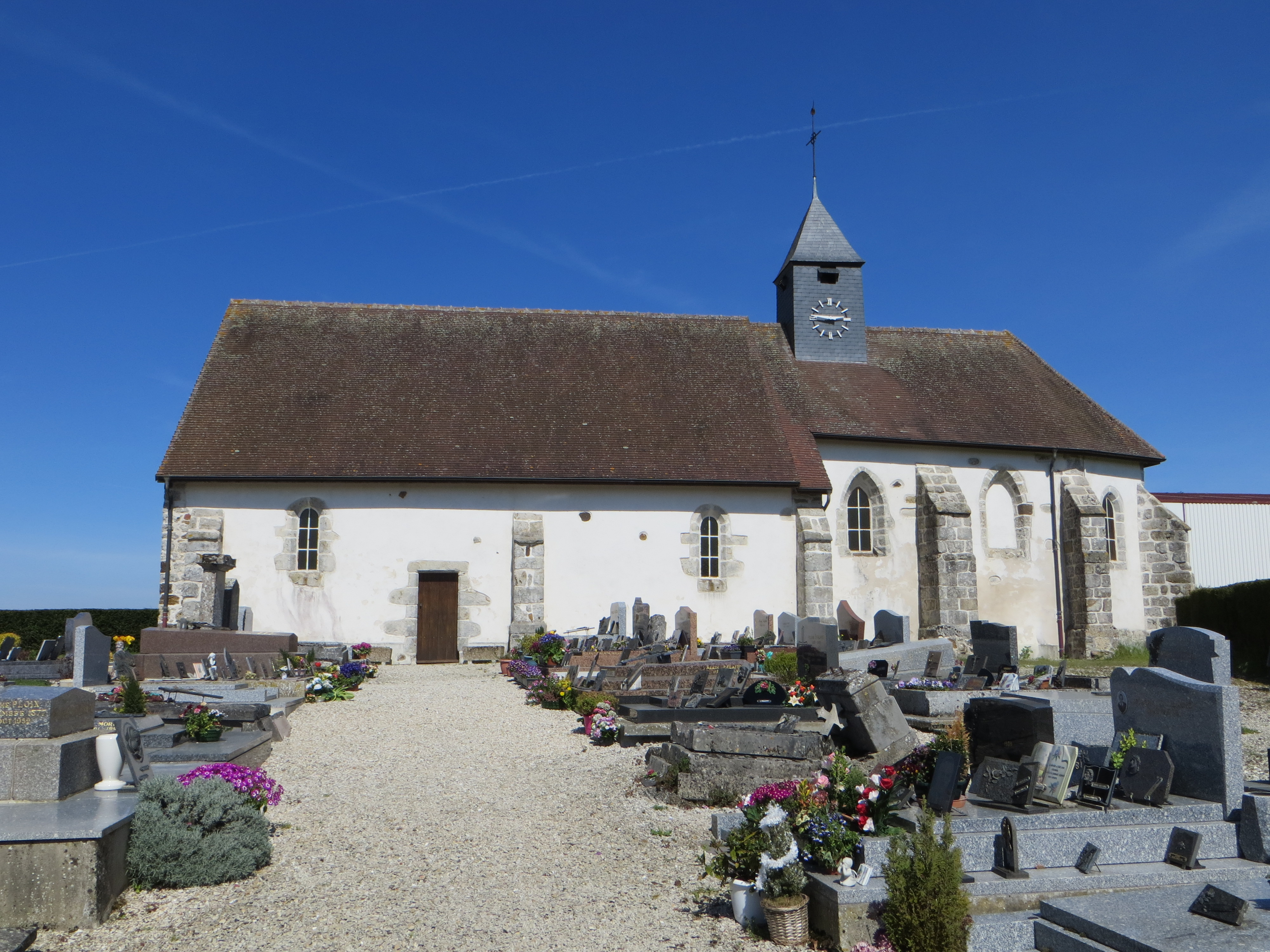
- The church in Saint-Remy-sous-Broyes
- Location of Saint-Remy-sous-Broyes
- Location within France Location within Grand Est
- Coordinates: 48°42′09″N 3°46′30″E
- Country: France
- Region: Grand Est
- Department: Marne
- Arrondissement: Épernay
- Canton: Sézanne-Brie et Champagne

Government
  - Mayor (2020–2026): Dany Carton
- Area^{1}: 7.75 km^{2} (2.99 sq mi)
- Elevation: 101 m (331 ft)
- Population (2023): 108
  - Density: 13.9/km^{2} (36.1/sq mi)
- Time zone: UTC+01:00 (CET)
  - Summer (DST): UTC+02:00 (CEST)
- INSEE/Postal code: 51514 /51120
- ^{1} French Land Register data, which excludes lakes, ponds, glaciers > 1 km^{2} (0.386 sq mi or 247 acres) and river estuaries.

Saint-Remy-sous-Broyes (French pronunciation: [sɛ̃ ʁemi su bʁwa], literally Saint-Remy under Broyes) is a commune in the Marne department in north-eastern France.

== See also ==
- Communes of the Marne department
