= Jean-Louis Laneuville =

French painter

Jean-Louis Titon La Neuville, called Jean-Louis Laneuville (French pronunciation: [ʒɑ̃ lwi lanøvil], 26 December 1756, Paris – 26 March 1826, Paris) was a French painter, art dealer and expert. He was a gifted portraitist who made portraits of eminent persons of the French Revolution in a style similar to that of his teacher Jacques-Louis David.

== Life ==
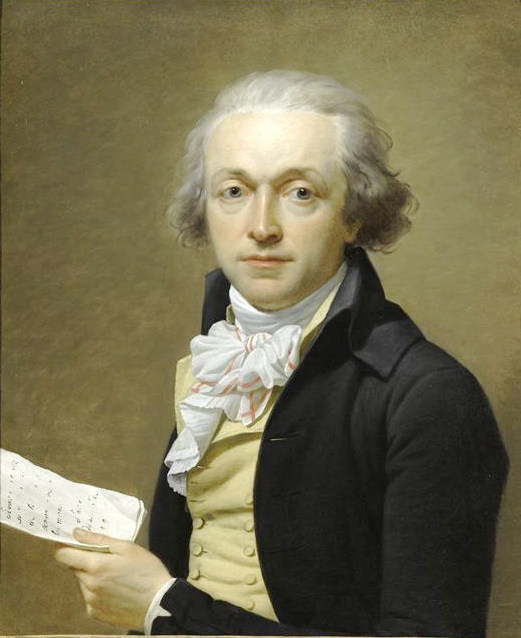
Portrait of Joseph Delaunay

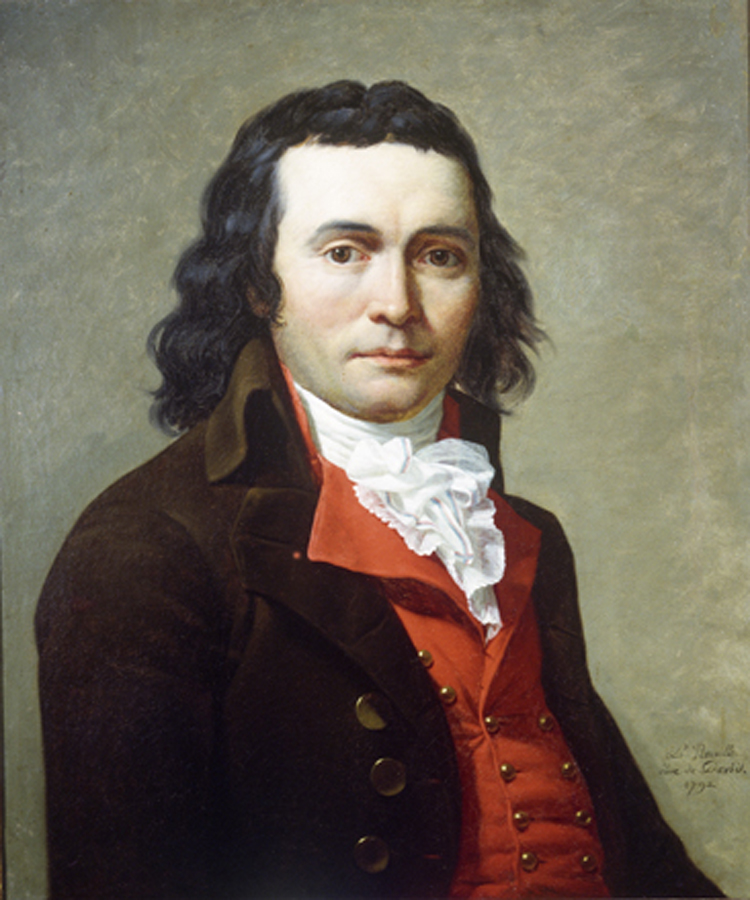
Portrait of Ruamps de Surgeres

Jean-Louis Laneuville was born in Paris as the natural son of J.B.M. Pierre Titon. His father was a prominent parliamentarian and rapporteur in the ‘’Affair of the Diamond Necklace". Little is known about his early training. He studied, at least briefly, with his contemporary Jacques-Louis David and exhibited at the open-air Exposition de la Jeunesse between 1783 and 1789. He started sending pictures to the official Salon after it was opened for non-academicians in 1791.

During the French Revolution (1789–95) Laneuville appears to have looked for patronage from the powerful political figures of his time. This is demonstrated by the fact that 8 of the 12 portraits he sent to the Salon of 1793 were politicians and in 1795 the numbers were four of the six. It is not clear whether he targeted these politicians because of his own political preferences or because he felt this was an untapped market.

Jean-Louis Laneuville resided and worked at the Hôtel de Longueville in central Paris from 1798 to 1804. Around this time Laneuville produced portraits of two young brothers: Pierre Robillard and Amedée-Selim Robillard, who were cousins of Théodore Géricault. Géricault was born in 1791, and was a year older than Amédée-Selim. Géricault's father worked at the family tobacco business at the Hôtel de Longueville from 1797 to 1806. Théodore Géricault's uncle, Jean-Baptiste Caruel, lived and worked at the Hôtel de Longueville from 1791 to 1804, allowing us to reliably date Théodore Géricault's first connection to Jean-Louis Laneuville to this period.

Laneuville portrayed deputies to the Convention, including Bertrand Barère de Vieuzac (1792-3; Kunsthalle Bremen), Pierre-François-Joseph Robert and Joseph Delaunay (1793; Palace of Versailles) and Jules-François Paré (1795; Carnavalet Museum). In 1791 he was elected a judge of the Prix d'Encouragement, and in 1796 signed a petition defending the acquisition of looted artworks.

Laneuville continued to receive private and official portrait commissions during the reign of Napoleon. He was also active as an expert art appraiser and possibly also as an art dealer since his estate included a large number of Old Masters and contemporary French art. Unlike his master David who was exiled in 1814 from France by Louis XVIII as a regicide, Laneuville exhibited work at the Salon until 1817. He may have worked for some time in Brussels as evidenced by the Portrait of Edouard Jean Joseph van de Velde, a member from an important family of Brussels merchants (Auctioned at Dorotheum on 6 October 2009 in Vienna, lot 163).

== Work ==
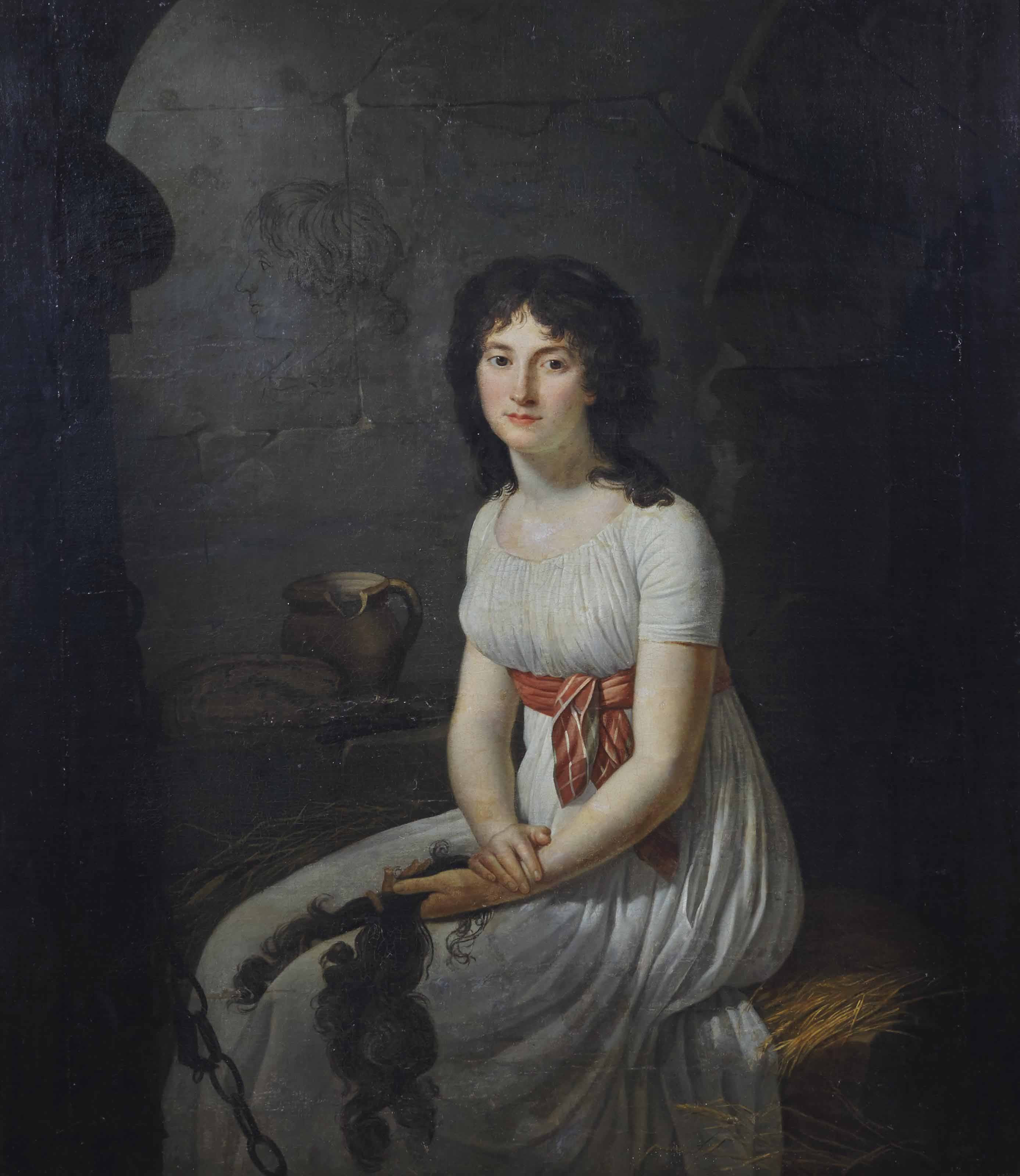
Citizen Tallien in a cell in La Force Prison

Laneuville was exclusively active as a portrait painter. His works from the French Revolution era are invariably painted along a very strict formula: they show the single sitter strongly delineated against a neutral background and depict the physiognomy and materials with painstaking precision. He applied paint in such a polished manner that the brushwork is not visible and reduced his colors to simple contrasts of strong tones. The sitter is always looking at the viewer in an intense and level manner. Laneuville's style was so similar to that of David, that many of his works have been wrongly attributed to David.

An example of his style is the Portrait of Jean Antoine Joseph Debry (1793, Indiana University Art Museum). Debry was a deputy to the National Convention which was to draw up a constitution for France following the Revolution. Debry is shown in the portrait with a serious expression which invites the viewer to share in his exercise of Republican responsibility and virtues. This type of representation suited the revolutionary ideas of the politically engaged individual.

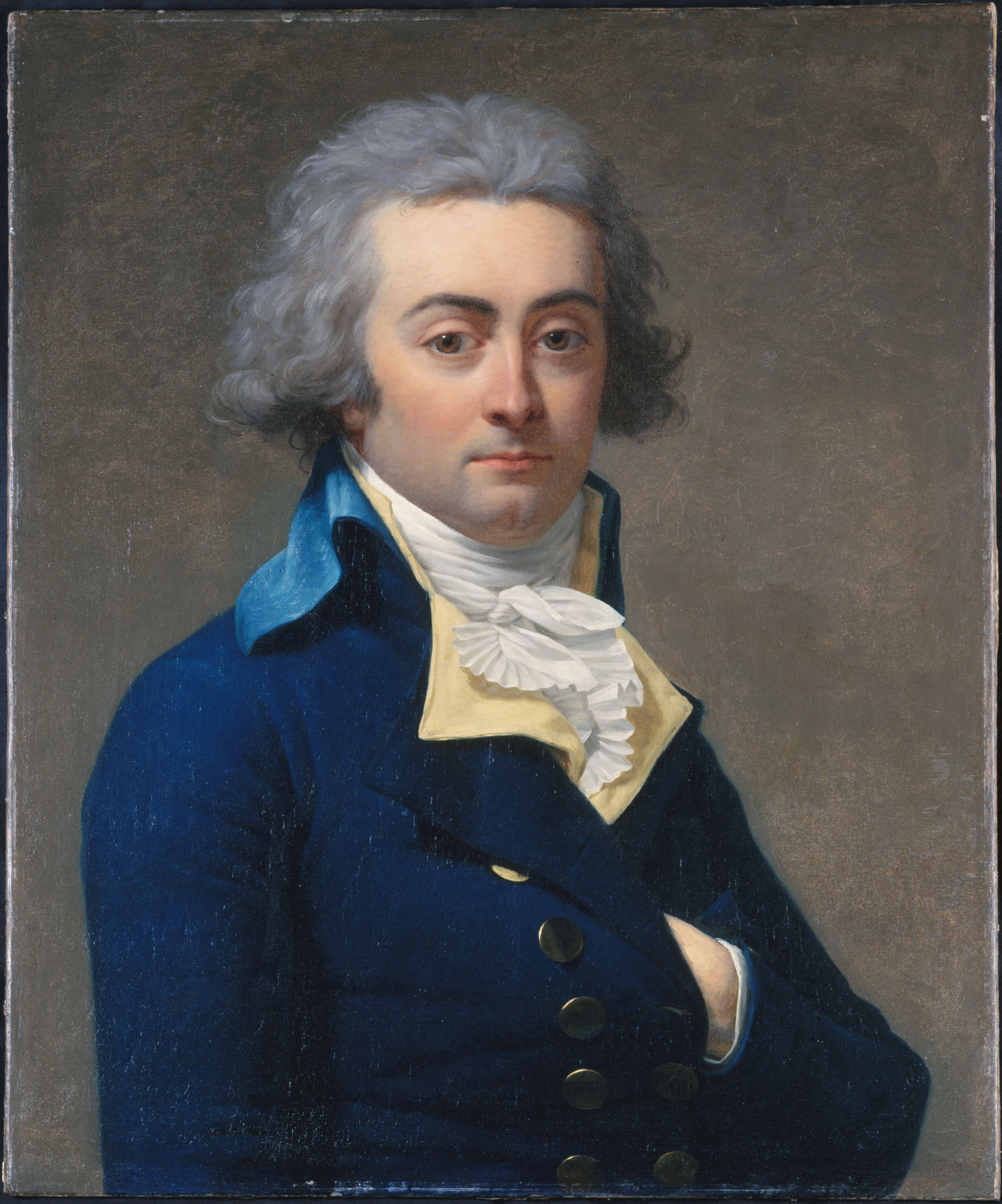
Portrait of Marie-Jean Hérault de Séchelles

While Laneuville almost exclusively made portraits of men, he was able to gain a commission from Thérésa Tallien, a rising star in Paris social circles following the termination of the Reign of Terror. She had been imprisoned herself in the last days of the Terror as she was the mistress of Jean-Lambert Tallien, who had fallen in disgrace for his criticism of the bloody methods of the Terrorist regime. A letter she was able to slip to her lover Jean-Lambert Tallien from her cell prompted him to mount the conspiracy that terminated the Reign of Terror. After the Reign of Terror had ended and she was released, she asked Laneuville 1795 to make a portrait of her in her cell. In the portrait Laneuville combined the conventions of male portraiture, which emphasized physical and psychological immediacy with the conventions of female portraiture which emphasized passivity. The depiction of the cell is believed to have been based on Tallien’s own description of the conditions of her incarceration. She is shown holding a lock of hair in her hand, hair that had been cut off in anticipation of her upcoming execution by the guillotine. On the wall behind her there is a drawing in profile of a man but it is not known of whom. The portrait of Thérésa Tallien was exhibited at the Salon of 1796, where it caused a scandal. It was removed from public view after a few days. It is likely that the painful memories of the Terror it evoked (especially that famous lock of hair cut before proceeding to the guillotine) were still too fresh for the public. The scandal may also have been caused by the imagery of the portrait, which emphasized the increased visibility of women in political life, and may also have awoken the spectre of Marie Antoinette who stood accused of having brought the nation to the brink because of her sexual impulses and political ambitions. A few days before the closing of the 1796 Salon, the portrait of Thérésa Tallien was returned to the exhibition after Laneuville had made some changes to it.
