= Pierre Bénézech =

French politician

Pierre Bénézech (born in Montpeyroux April 8, 1749, died at Cap Français in Saint-Domingue on June 13, 1802) was a French politician.

== Biography ==
Before the Revolution, he was the owner of the Petites Affiches, a law gazette. At the same time, he fulfilled the functions of principal resident agent of the Estates of Languedoc in Paris. He also managed the fortune of his wife, who was the widow of Baron Claude Théophile de Boeil.

When the French Revolution broke out, Bénézech espoused its principles and became commander of the National Guard and then administrator of the department of Seine-et-Oise.

In 1794 he was called by the Committee of Public Safety to chair the eleventh commission on weapons, powder and mining. He launched a major campaign for the extraction of saltpetre; he also activated the work of the mines, centralising the arms industry, and creating a munitions factory in Versailles.

On November 3, 1795, he was appointed Minister of the Interior under the Directory. In the management of this ministry, he showed organizational talents and great activity. He created councils for agriculture, commerce and the arts, reformed the École polytechnique and the education system, and promoted the fine arts, particularly favouring the Louvre over other institutions.

He found himself compromised in the Grenelle camp conspiracy, although he was able to prove his innocence. His friendships with some of the most prominent deputies of the Club de Clichy prompted the Directory, on July 14, 1797, to replace him at the Ministry of the Interior with Nicolas François de Neufchâteau.

Following the coup of 18 Brumaire, which he supported, he entered the Conseil d'État established by the consulate but did not play any significant role there. Napoleon entrusted him with the inspection of the Tuileries Palace and made him a sort of master of ceremonies and maître d'hôtel of the place.

Unhappy with this role, he asked the First Consul for permission to accompany, as colonial prefect, General Leclerc, who commanded the expedition against Saint-Domingue. Having left with his family, in the hope of asserting the rights he held from his father-in-law over large properties located in this colony, he died there in 1802, shortly after his arrival, of yellow fever.
