= Saffais =

- Commune
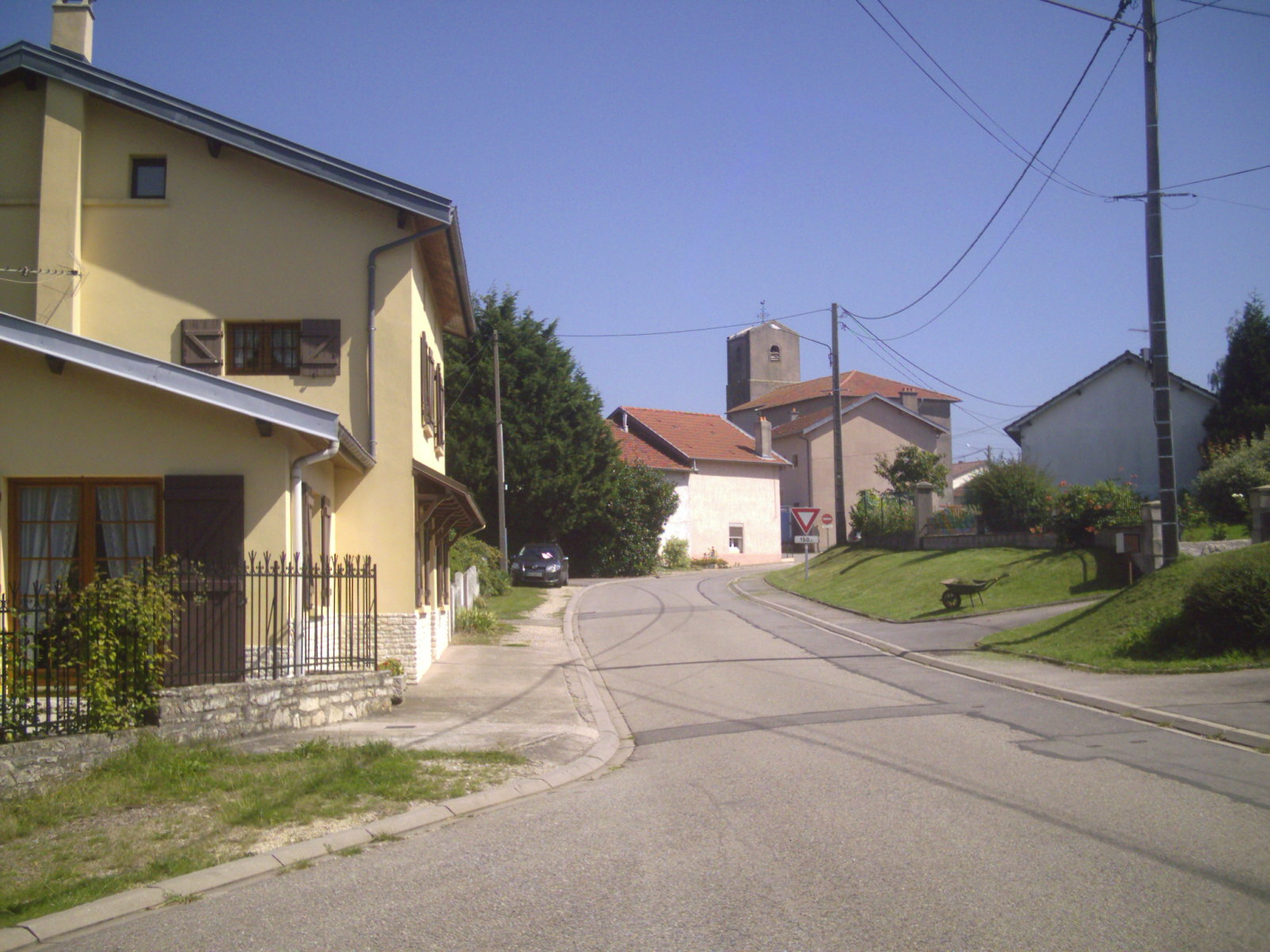
- The church and surroundings in Saffais

- Coat of arms
- Location of Saffais
- Location within France Location within Grand Est
- Coordinates: 48°33′22″N 6°18′45″E
- Country: France
- Region: Grand Est
- Department: Meurthe-et-Moselle
- Arrondissement: Nancy
- Canton: Lunéville-2
- Intercommunality: Pays du Sel et du Vermois

Government
  - Mayor (2020–2026): André Schmitt
- Area^{1}: 4.04 km^{2} (1.56 sq mi)
- Elevation: 357 m (1,171 ft)
- Highest elevation: 353 m (1,158 ft)
- Lowest elevation: 240 m (790 ft)
- Population (2023): 104
  - Density: 25.7/km^{2} (66.7/sq mi)
- Time zone: UTC+01:00 (CET)
  - Summer (DST): UTC+02:00 (CEST)
- INSEE/Postal code: 54468 /54210
- ^{1} French Land Register data, which excludes lakes, ponds, glaciers > 1 km^{2} (0.386 sq mi or 247 acres) and river estuaries.

Saffais (French pronunciation: [safɛ]) is a commune in the Meurthe-et-Moselle department in north-eastern France.

== See also ==
- Communes of the Meurthe-et-Moselle department
