= Allemant, Marne =

Allemant
- Commune
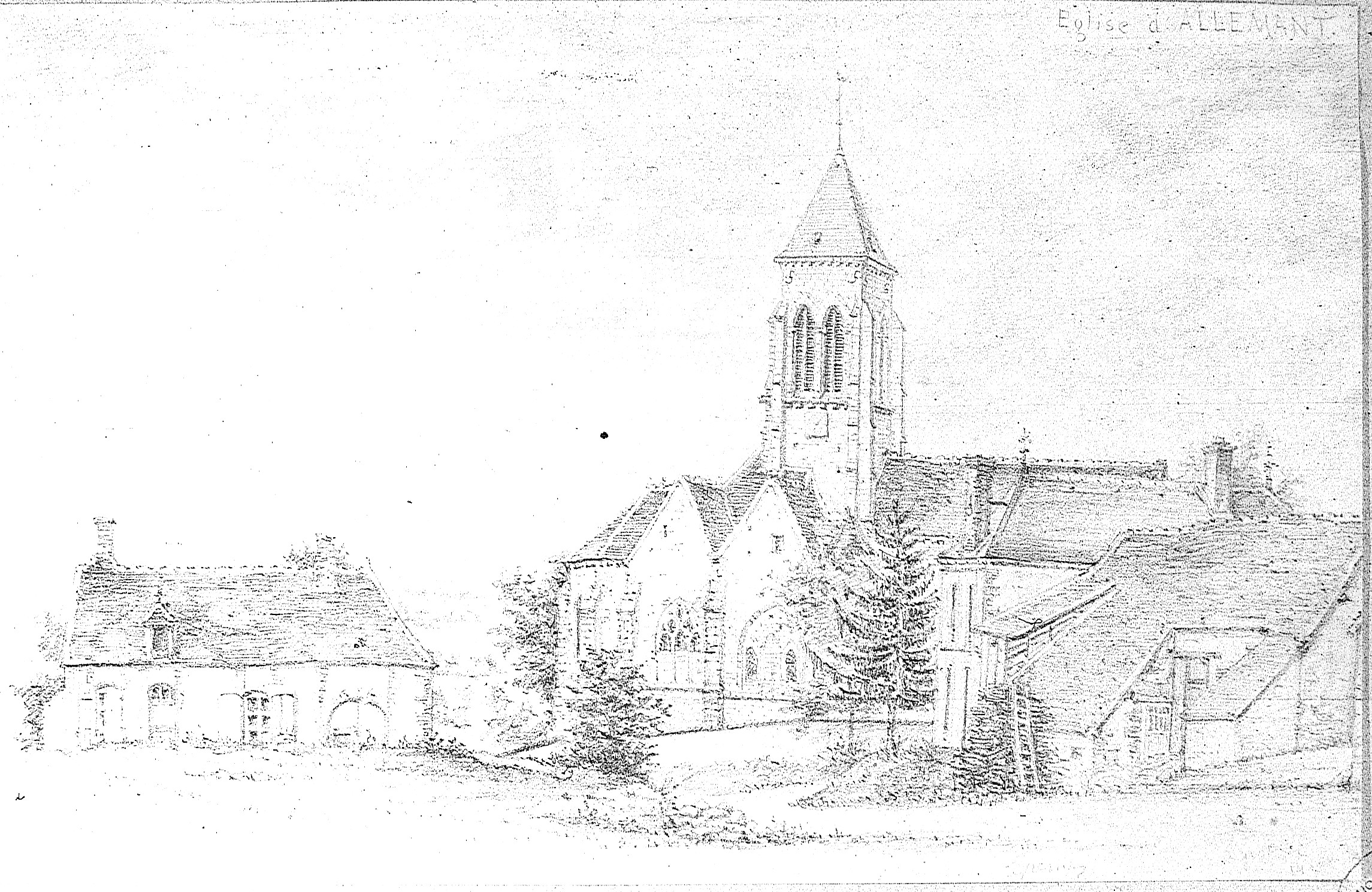
- The 19th century church in Allemant
- Location of Allemant
- Location within France Location within Grand Est
- Coordinates: 48°45′43″N 3°48′04″E
- Country: France
- Region: Grand Est
- Department: Marne
- Arrondissement: Épernay
- Canton: Sézanne-Brie et Champagne

Government
  - Mayor (2020–2026): Carole Doucet
- Area^{1}: 15.77 km^{2} (6.09 sq mi)
- Elevation: 226 m (741 ft)
- Population (2023): 166
  - Density: 10.5/km^{2} (27.3/sq mi)
- Time zone: UTC+01:00 (CET)
  - Summer (DST): UTC+02:00 (CEST)
- INSEE/Postal code: 51005 /51120
- ^{1} French Land Register data, which excludes lakes, ponds, glaciers > 1 km^{2} (0.386 sq mi or 247 acres) and river estuaries.

Allemant (French pronunciation: [al(ə)mɑ̃]) is a commune in the Marne department in northeastern France.

== Population ==
Historical population
Year	Pop.	±% p.a.
1968	140	—
1975	156	+1.56%
1982	168	+1.06%
1990	148	−1.57%
1999	169	+1.49%
2007	159	−0.76%
2012	168	+1.11%
2017	164	−0.48%
2023	166	+0.20%
Source: INSEE

== See also ==
- Communes of the Marne department
