= François Sébastien Letourneux =

French lawyer and politician (1752–1814)

- Born: 1752; Saint-Julien-de-Concelles, Loire-Inférieure, France
- Died: 1814 (aged 61–62); Saint-Julien-de-Concelles, Loire-Inférieure, France
- Occupations: Lawyer, politician
- Known for: Minister of the Interior

François Sébastien Letourneux (1752–1814) was a French lawyer and politician who was Minister of the Interior under the Directory.

== Life ==
François Sébastien Letourneux was born in Saint-Julien-de-Concelles, Brittany, in 1752. He practiced as an advocate before the French Revolution. He was appointed Attorney for the Loire-Inférieure department in 1791. On 23 Fructidor year V (14 September 1797) he was named Minister of the Interior. He replaced François de Neufchâteau, who had been appointed a member of the Directory. He held this position until 30 Messidor year VI (17 June 1798), when Neufchâteau returned as Minister of the Interior on 2 Thermidor year VI.

Letourneux, who was inexperienced in national politics, was responsible for enforcing the new republican calendar, with its ten-day weeks. This included finding ways to ensure the calendar was adopted, while holding back over-zealous local officials who wanted, for example, to close churches on the old Sundays and religious holidays. Such church closures would be in conflict with the principle of tolerance of all religions. Under Letourneux's administration the Directory issued the decree of 27 Brumaire Year VI in support of public education, and the decree of 17 Pluviôse year VI requiring special supervision of private educational establishments.

In year VII Letourneux was elected to the Council of Ancients. After 18 Brumaire he joined the judiciary. He was a judge when he died in 1814.

== Bibliography ==
- Letourneux, François-Sébastien (1798). Corps législatif. Conseil des Anciens. Rapport fait par Letourneux,... sur la résolution du 8 messidor an VII, relative aux greffes des tribunaux criminels et correctionnels. Séance du 13 messidor an VII. Impr. nationale. p. 10.
- Letourneux, François-Sébastien (1799). Corps législatif. Conseil des Anciens. Opinion de Letourneux sur la résolution du 2 vendémiaire an VIII, qui déclare traîtres à la patrie tous négociateurs, généraux, ministres, directeurs et autres que ce soit, citoyens français qui proposeraient ou accepteraient des conditions de paix tendantes à modifier la Constitution de l'an III ou à altérer l'intégralité du territoire de la République. Séance du 16 vendémiaire an VIII. Impr. nationale. p. 15.
