= Antoine Duranton =

French revolutionary, minister of justice and finance

Antoine Duranthon (1736 – 20 December 1793) was Minister of Justice in the Government of France from April to July 1792. He was born in Dordogne. He was guillotined during the French Revolution.

Preceded by Jean Marie Roland de la Platière	Minister of Justice of France; 1792	Succeeded by Étienne Dejoly
