= Rieux, Marne =

Rieux
- Commune
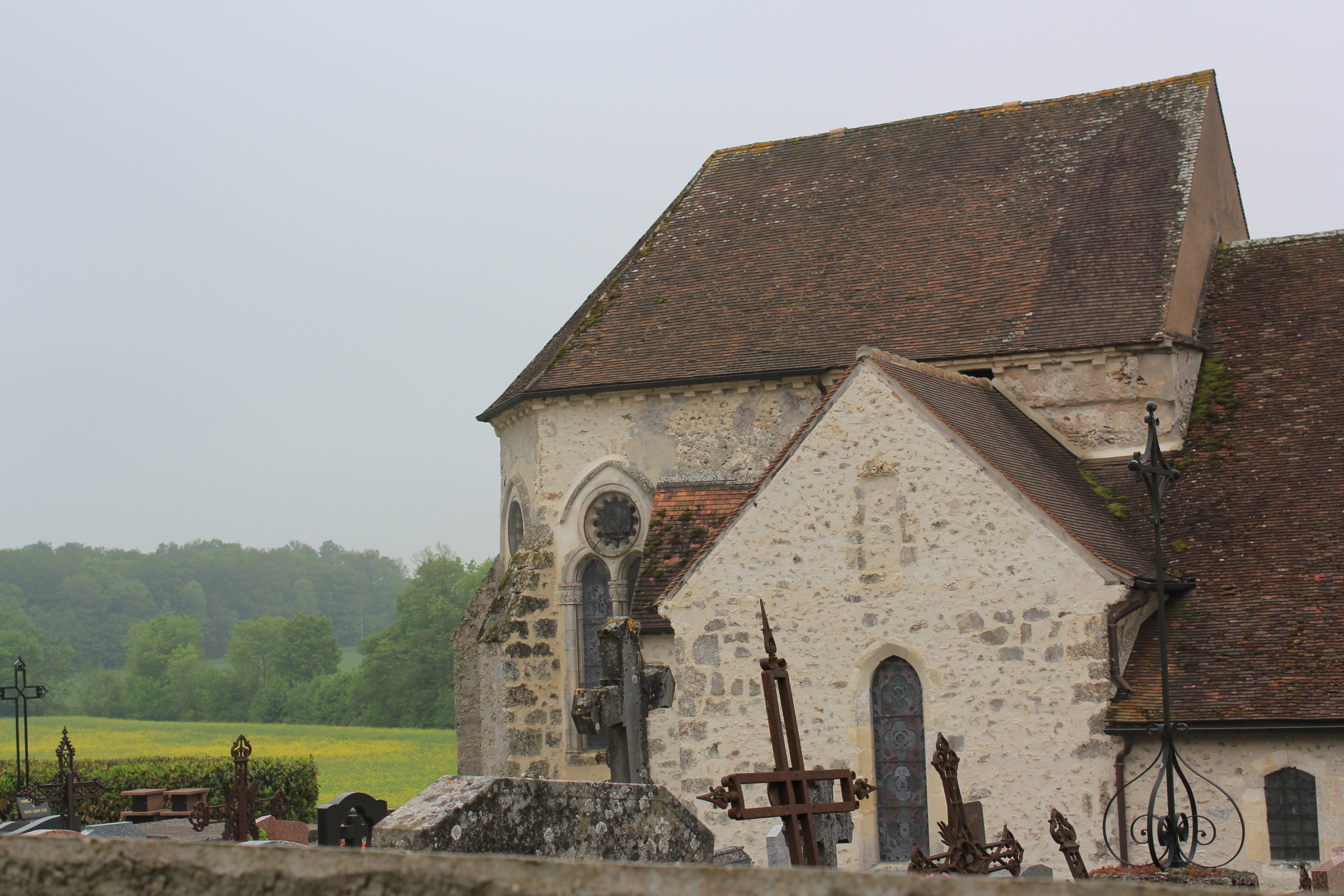
- The church in Rieux
- Location of Rieux
- Location within France Location within Grand Est
- Coordinates: 48°51′05″N 3°30′04″E
- Country: France
- Region: Grand Est
- Department: Marne
- Arrondissement: Épernay
- Canton: Sézanne-Brie et Champagne

Government
  - Mayor (2020–2026): Laurent Épinat
- Area^{1}: 11.56 km^{2} (4.46 sq mi)
- Elevation: 162 m (531 ft)
- Population (2023): 189
  - Density: 16.3/km^{2} (42.3/sq mi)
- Time zone: UTC+01:00 (CET)
  - Summer (DST): UTC+02:00 (CEST)
- INSEE/Postal code: 51460 /51210
- ^{1} French Land Register data, which excludes lakes, ponds, glaciers > 1 km^{2} (0.386 sq mi or 247 acres) and river estuaries.

Rieux (French pronunciation: [ʁijø]) is a commune in the Marne department in north-eastern France.

== See also ==
- Communes of the Marne department
- Rio (disambiguation)
- Ríos (disambiguation)
