= Broyes, Marne =

Broyes
- Commune
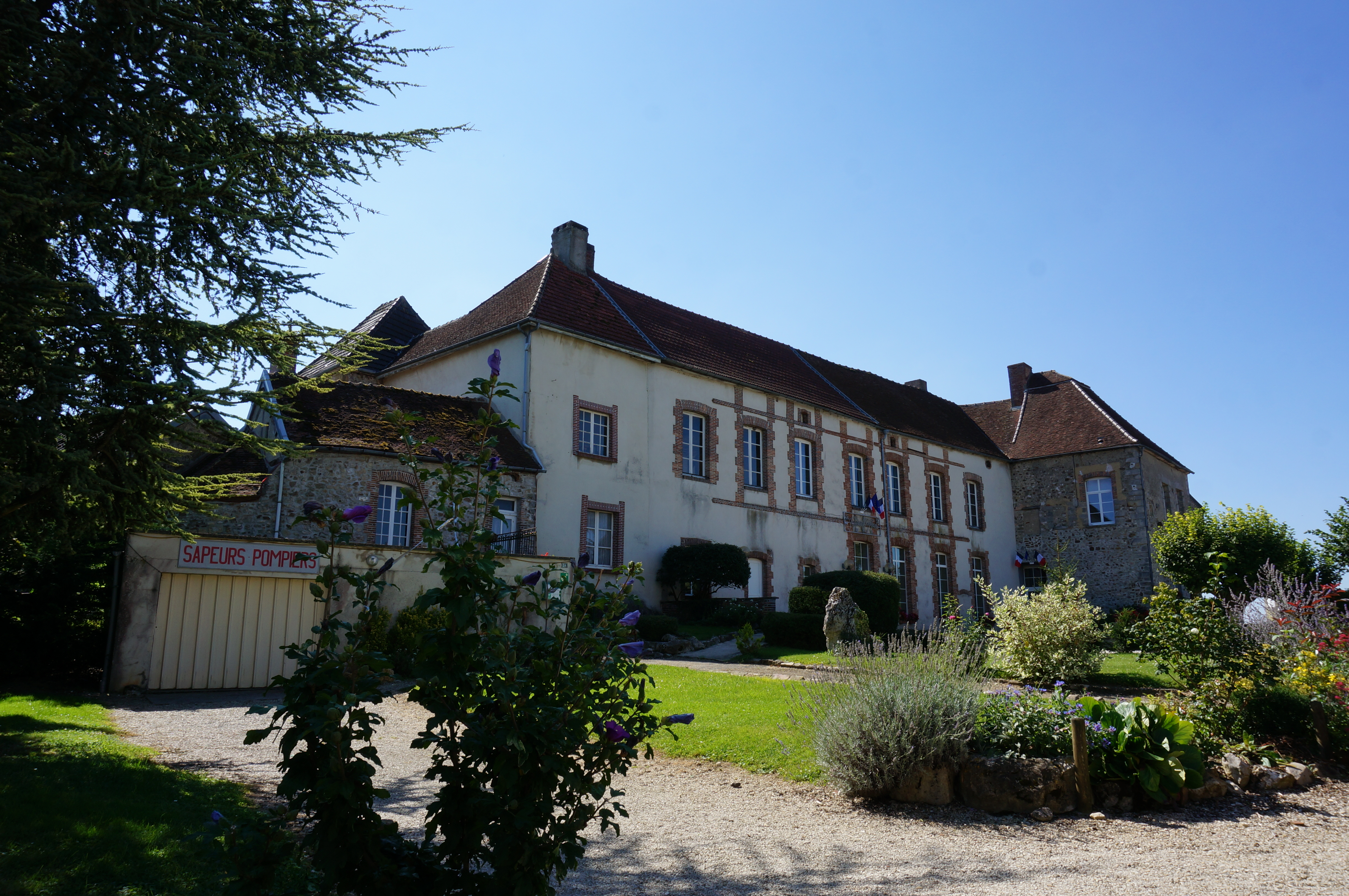
- The town hall in Broyes

- Coat of arms
- Location of Broyes
- Location within France Location within Grand Est
- Coordinates: 48°45′34″N 3°45′59″E
- Country: France
- Region: Grand Est
- Department: Marne
- Arrondissement: Épernay
- Canton: Sézanne-Brie et Champagne

Government
  - Mayor (2020–2026): Isabelle Corbières
- Area^{1}: 15.24 km^{2} (5.88 sq mi)
- Elevation: 230 m (750 ft)
- Population (2023): 340
  - Density: 22/km^{2} (58/sq mi)
- Time zone: UTC+01:00 (CET)
  - Summer (DST): UTC+02:00 (CEST)
- INSEE/Postal code: 51092 /51120
- ^{1} French Land Register data, which excludes lakes, ponds, glaciers > 1 km^{2} (0.386 sq mi or 247 acres) and river estuaries.

Broyes (French pronunciation: [bʁwa]) is a commune in the Marne department in northeastern France.

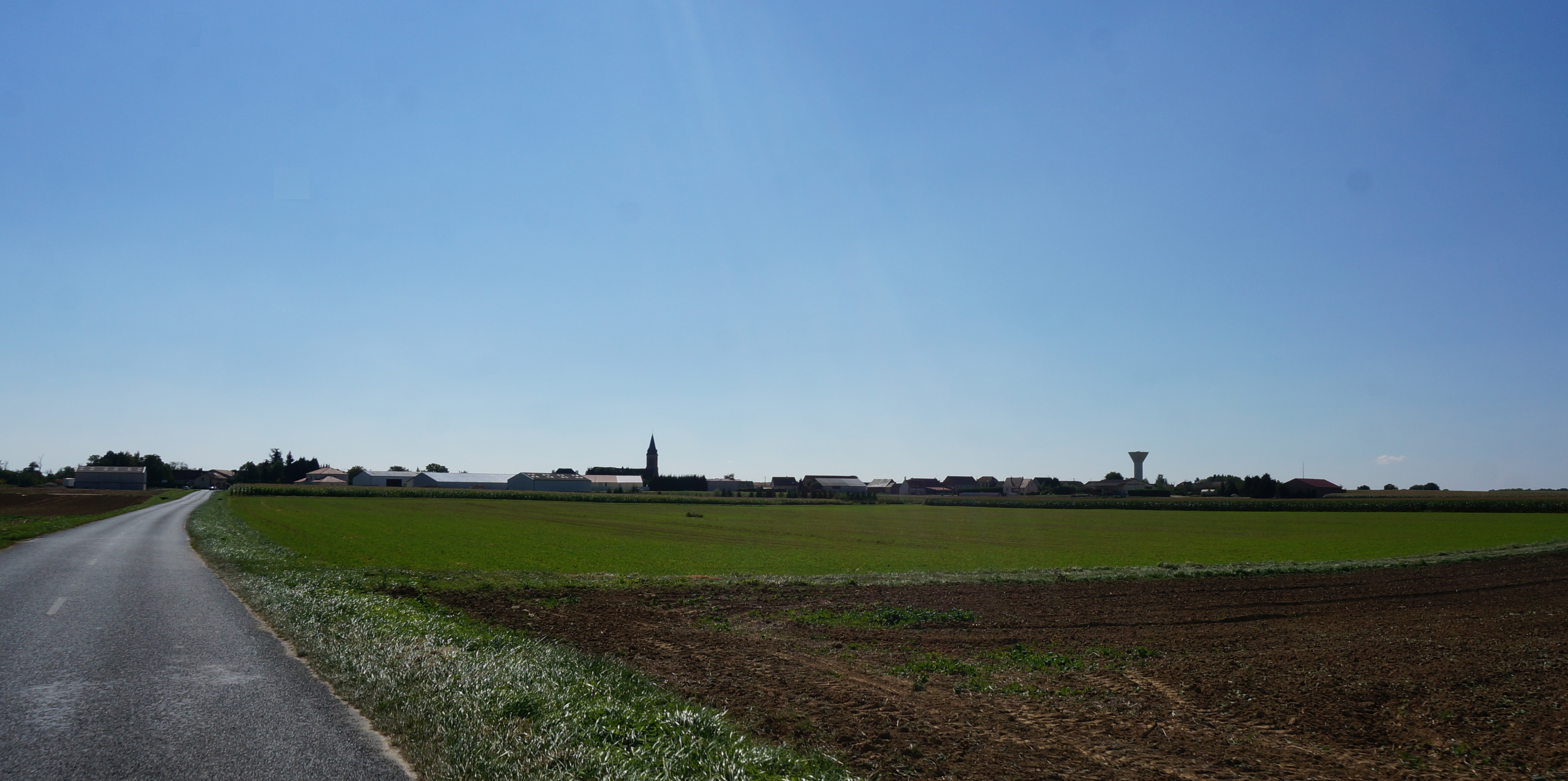

== Population ==
Historical population
Year	Pop.	±% p.a.
1968	487	—
1975	454	−1.00%
1982	463	+0.28%
1990	436	−0.75%
1999	374	−1.69%
2007	387	+0.43%
2012	366	−1.11%
2017	361	−0.27%
2023	340	−0.99%
Source: INSEE

== See also ==
- Communes of the Marne department
