= Jacques Augustin Mourgue =

Jacques (also wrongly known as Jacques Augustin and Jacques Aoûtin) Antoine Mourgue (2 June 1734, Marsillargues – 15 January 1818, Paris) was a French politician and minister. He served as Interior Minister for five days from 12 to 18 June 1792 during the French Revolution. He was buried in the 39th division of the cimetière du Père-Lachaise.

== Works ==
He wrote a large number of works on politics and economics:

- Vues d'un citoyen sur la composition des États-Généraux (A citizen's view on the composition of the Estates General, 1788)
- De la France relativement à l'Angleterre et à la maison d'Autriche (On France, relative to England and the house of Austria, 1797)
- Plan d'une caisse de prévoyance et de secours présenté à l'administration des hospices et secours à domicile (Plan on a case of foresight and of security regarding the administration of hospitals and health at home, 1809)
- Essai de statistique (Essay on statistics, containing observations on births, marriages and deaths, relative calculations on the probabilities of life, and meteorological tables)

He also wrote one work on wine and vine-growing:

- Observations sur les Mémoires qui ont concouru : et Analyse de celui qui a été couronné sur cette question : Déterminer par un moyen fixe, simple, et à portée de tout cultivateur, le moment auquel le vin en fermentation dans la cuve aura acquis toute la force et toute la qualité dont il est susceptible. Montpellier, Jean Martel aîné, 1781

== Sources ==
- http://gw1.geneanet.org/index.php3?b=saorsel&lang=fr;p=jacques+antoine;n=mourgue
