= Bon-Claude Cahier de Gerville =

French politician

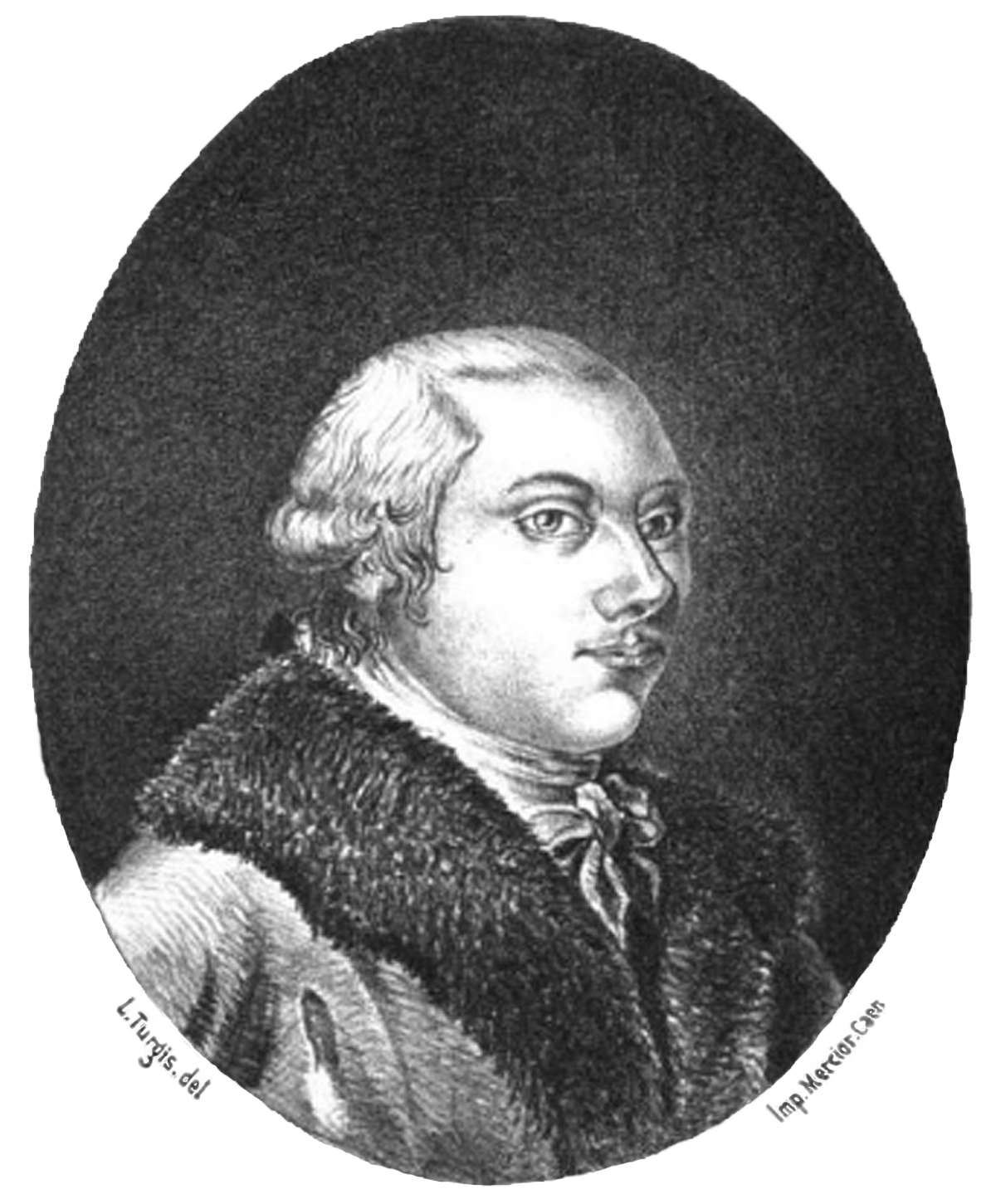
Bon-Claude Cahier de Gerville (1751-1796) Unterschrift Bon-Claude Cahier de Gerville (1751-1796)

Bon-Claude Cahier de Gerville (30 November 1751, in Bayeux – 15 February 1796, in Bayeux) was a notable figure in the French Revolution.

== Life ==
His father was receiver for the city of Bayeux. Bon-Claude added 'de Gerville' to his name, studied law in Paris and was received as avocat (lawyer) to the Parlement. In 1789 he was made elector for Paris and représentant de la commune for the Sépulcre district. He was then sent to Nancy when the Châteauvieux Regiment revolted in August 1790, the Nancy Mutiny. In October 1789 he had also been made deputy procurer-syndic.

On 17 November 1791 the Feuillants in the Legislative Assembly made him Interior Minister.

== Sources ==
- Ferdinand Buisson, Dictionnaire pédagogique, 1911
