= List of presidents of the National Assembly of France =

This article lists presidents of the French Parliament or, as the case may be, of its lower chamber.

The National Constituent Assembly was created in 1789 out of the Estates-General. It, and the revolutionary legislative assemblies that followed – the Legislative Assembly (1791–1792) and the National Convention (1792–1795), had a quickly rotating presidency. With the establishment of the Directory in 1795, there were two chambers of the French legislature. The lower, the Council of Five Hundred, also had a quickly rotating chairmanship. Under Napoleon I, the Legislative Corps had all authority to actually enact laws, but was essentially a rubberstamp body, lacking the power to debate legislation. With the restoration of the monarchy, a bicameral system was restored, with a Chamber of Peers and a Chamber of Deputies. The Chamber of Deputies, for the first time, had presidents elected for a substantial period of time.

With the revolution of 1848, the monarchical assemblies were dissolved and replaced again with a unicameral National Assembly, which Napoleon III replaced with a new version of his uncle's Legislative Corps. With the establishment of the Third Republic, the name of Chamber of Deputies was restored; after 1876 it was joined by a Senate as upper house. The Chamber of Deputies was renamed the National Assembly in the constitution of the Fourth Republic, and is still known as that.

== Presidents of the National Constituent Assembly (1789–1791) ==
Presidents of the National Constituent Assembly rotated in short periods.

L'Assemblée Nationale Constituante
| President | Began | Ended |
|---|---|---|
| Jean-Sylvain Bailly | 17 June 1789 | 3 July 1789 |
| Louis Philippe Joseph, duc d'Orléans | 3 July 1789 | 3 July 1789 |
| Jean-Georges Lefranc de Pompignan | 3 July 1789 | 18 July 1789 |
| François Alexandre Frédéric, duc de La Rochefoucauld-Liancourt | 18 July 1789 | 3 August 1789 |
| Jacques Guillaume Thouret | 3 August 1789 | 3 August 1789 |
| Isaac René Guy le Chapelier | 3 August 1789 | 17 August 1789 |
| Stanislas, comte de Clermont-Tonnerre | 17 August 1789 | 31 August 1789 |
| César Guillaume de La Luzerne | 31 August 1789 | 9 September 1789 |
| Stanislas, comte de Clermont-Tonnerre | 9 September 1789 | 28 September 1789 |
| Jean-Joseph Mounier | 28 September 1789 | 10 October 1789 |
| Emmanuel Marie Michel Philippe Fréteau de Saint-Just | 10 October 1789 | 28 October 1789 |
| Armand Gaston Camus | 28 October 1789 | 12 November 1789 |
| Jacques Guillaume Thouret | 12 November 1789 | 23 November 1789 |
| Raymond de Boisgelin de Cucé | 23 November 1789 | 5 December 1789 |
| Emmanuel Marie Michel Philippe Fréteau de Saint-Just | 5 December 1789 | 22 December 1789 |
| Jean-Nicolas Démeunier | 22 December 1789 | 4 January 1790 |
| François-Xavier de Montesquiou-Fézensac | 4 January 1790 | 18 January 1790 |
| Gui-Jean-Baptiste Target | 18 January 1790 | 2 February 1790 |
| Jean-Xavier Bureau de Pusy | 2 February 1790 | 16 February 1790 |
| Charles Maurice de Talleyrand-Périgord | 16 February 1790 | 28 February 1790 |
| François-Xavier de Montesquiou-Fézensac | 28 February 1790 | 15 March 1790 |
| Jean-Paul Rabaut Saint-Étienne | 15 March 1790 | 27 March 1790 |
| Jean-François, baron de Menou | 27 March 1790 | 12 April 1790 |
| Charles François, Marquis de Bonnay | 12 April 1790 | 27 April 1790 |
| François Henri, comte de Virieu | 27 April 1790 | 29 April 1790 |
| Jean-Louis Gouttes | 29 April 1790 | 8 May 1790 |
| Jacques Guillaume Thouret | 8 May 1790 | 27 May 1790 |
| Bon-Albert Briois de Beaumetz | 27 May 1790 | 8 June 1790 |
| Emmanuel Joseph Sieyès | 8 June 1790 | 21 June 1790 |
| Louis-Michel Le Peletier de Saint-Fargeau | 21 June 1790 | 5 July 1790 |
| Charles François, Marquis de Bonnay | 5 July 1790 | 20 July 1790 |
| Jean-Baptiste Treilhard | 20 July 1790 | 31 July 1790 |
| Antoine d'André | 31 July 1790 | 16 August 1790 |
| Samuel-Pierre Du Pont de Nemours | 16 August 1790 | 30 August 1790 |
| Joseph-Henri baron de Jessé | 30 August 1790 | 11 September 1790 |
| Jean-Xavier Bureau de Pusy | 11 September 1790 | 25 September 1790 |
| Jean-Louis Emmery | 25 September 1790 | 9 October 1790 |
| Philippe-Antoine Merlin (known as Merlin de Douai) | 9 October 1790 | 25 October 1790 |
| Antoine Barnave | 25 October 1790 | 8 November 1790 |
| Charles-Antoine Chasset | 8 November 1790 | 20 November 1790 |
| Alexandre de Lameth | 20 November 1790 | 4 December 1790 |
| Jérôme Pétion de Villeneuve | 4 December 1790 | 20 December 1790 |
| Charles François, Marquis de Bonnay | 20 December 1790 | 20 December 1790 |
| Antoine d'André | 20 December 1790 | 4 January 1791 |
| Jean-Louis Emmery | 4 January 1791 | 18 January 1791 |
| Henri Jean-Baptiste Grégoire | 18 January 1791 | 29 January 1791 |
| Honoré-Gabriel Riqueti, comte de Mirabeau | 29 January 1791 | 14 February 1791 |
| Adrien Duport | 14 February 1791 | 26 February 1791 |
| Louis-Marie, vicomte de Noailles | 26 February 1791 | 14 March 1791 |
| Anne-Pierre, marquis de Montesquiou-Fézensac | 14 March 1791 | 29 March 1791 |
| François Denis Tronchet | 29 March 1791 | 9 April 1791 |
| Jean-Baptiste-Charles Chabroud | 9 April 1791 | 23 April 1791 |
| Jean-François Reubell | 23 April 1791 | 9 May 1791 |
| Antoine d'André | 9 May 1791 | 24 May 1791 |
| Jean-Xavier Bureau de Pusy | 24 May 1791 | 6 June 1791 |
| Luc Dauchy | 6 June 1791 | 19 June 1791 |
| Alexandre, vicomte de Beauharnais | 19 June 1791 | 3 July 1791 |
| Charles de Lameth | 3 July 1791 | 19 July 1791 |
| Jacques Defermon des Chapelières | 19 July 1791 | 30 July 1791 |
| Alexandre, vicomte de Beauharnais | 30 July 1791 | 13 August 1791 |
| Charles Louis Victor, prince de Broglie | 13 August 1791 | 27 August 1791 |
| Théodore Vernier | 27 August 1791 | 10 September 1791 |
| Jacques Guillaume Thouret | 10 September 1791 | 30 September 1791 |

== Presidents of the Legislative Assembly (1791–1792) ==
Presidents of the Legislative Assembly rotated in short periods.

L'Assemblée Nationale Legislative
| Portrait | Name | Department | Took office | Left office | Political group |
|---|---|---|---|---|---|
| | Claude-Emmanuel de Pastoret | Paris | 3 October 1791 | 30 October 1791 | Feuillants |
| | Pierre Victurnien Vergniaud | Gironde | 30 October 1791 | 15 November 1791 | Jacobins |
| | Vincent-Marie Viénot | Seine-et-Marne | 15 November 1791 | 28 November 1791 | Feuillants |
| | Bernard Germain de Lacépède | Paris | 28 November 1791 | 10 December 1791 | Feuillants |
| | Pierre-Édouard Lémontey | Rhône | 10 December 1791 | 26 December 1791 | Feuillants |
| | François de Neufchâteau | Vosges | 26 December 1791 | 22 January 1792 | Jacobins |
| | Marguerite-Élie Guadet | Gironde | 22 January 1792 | 7 February 1792 | Jacobins |
| | Nicolas de Condorcet | Paris | 7 February 1792 | 19 February 1792 | Jacobins |
| | Guillaume-Mathieu Dumas | Seine-et-Oise | 19 February 1792 | 4 March 1792 | Feuillants |
| | Louis-Bernard Guyton de Morveau | Côte-d'Or | 4 March 1792 | 19 March 1792 | Jacobins |
| | Armand Gensonné | Gironde | 19 March 1792 | 15 April 1792 | Jacobins |
| | Félix-Julien-Jean Bigot de Préameneu | Ille-et-Vilaine | 15 April 1792 | 29 April 1792 | Feuillants |
| | Jean-Gérard Lacuée | Lot-et-Garonne | 29 April 1792 | 13 May 1792 | Feuillants |
| | Honoré Muraire | Var | 13 May 1792 | 27 May 1792 | Feuillants |
| | François-Alexandre Tardiveau | Ille-et-Vilaine | 27 May 1792 | 10 June 1792 | Feuillants |
| | Antoine Français de Nantes | Loire-Inférieure | 10 June 1792 | 24 June 1792 | Independent |
| | Louis Stanislas de Girardin | Oise | 24 June 1792 | 8 July 1792 | Jacobins |
| | Jean-Baptiste Annibal Aubert du Bayet | Isère | 8 July 1792 | 22 July 1792 | Feuillants |
| | André-Daniel Laffon de Ladebat | Gironde | 22 July 1792 | 7 August 1792 | Feuillants |
| | Jean-François Honoré Merlet | Maine-et-Loire | 7 August 1792 | 20 August 1792 | Jacobins |
| | Jean-François Delacroix | Eure-et-Loir | 20 August 1792 | 2 September 1792 | Jacobins |
| | Marie-Jean Hérault de Séchelles | Paris | 2 September 1792 | 16 September 1792 | Jacobins |
| | Pierre-Joseph Cambon | Hérault | 16 September 1792 | 20 September 1792 | Jacobins |

== Presidents of the National Convention (1792–1795) ==
| Portrait | Name | Department | Took office | Left office | Political group |
|---|---|---|---|---|---|
| | Jérôme Pétion de Villeneuve | Eure-et-Loir | 20 September 1792 | 4 October 1792 | Girondins |
| | Jean-François Delacroix | Eure-et-Loir | 4 October 1792 | 18 October 1792 | The Mountain |
| | Marguerite-Élie Guadet | Gironde | 18 October 1792 | 1 November 1792 | Girondins |
| | Marie-Jean Hérault de Séchelles (1st term) | Seine-et-Oise | 1 November 1792 | 15 November 1792 | The Mountain |
| | Henri Grégoire | Loir-et-Cher | 15 November 1792 | 29 November 1792 | The Plain |
| | Bertrand Barère de Vieuzac | Seine-et-Oise | 29 November 1792 | 13 December 1792 | The Plain |
| | Jacques Defermon des Chapelières | Ille-et-Vilaine | 15 December 1792 | 27 December 1792 | Girondins |
| | Jean-Baptiste Treilhard | Seine-et-Oise | 27 December 1792 | 10 January 1793 | The Plain |
| | Pierre-Victurnien Vergniaud | Gironde | 10 January 1793 | 24 January 1793 | Girondins |
| | Jean-Paul Rabaut Saint-Étienne | Aube | 24 January 1793 | 7 February 1793 | Girondins |
| | Jean-Jacques Bréard | Charente-Inférieure | 7 February 1793 | 21 February 1793 | The Mountain |
| | Edmond Louis Alexis Dubois-Crancé | Ardennes | 21 February 1793 | 7 March 1793 | The Mountain |
| | Armand Gensonné | Gironde | 7 March 1793 | 21 March 1793 | Girondins |
| | Jean Debry | Aisne | 21 March 1793 | 4 April 1793 | The Plain |
| | Jean-François-Bertrand Delmas | Haute-Garonne | 4 April 1793 | 18 April 1793 | The Mountain |
| | Marc David Alba Lasource | Tarn | 18 April 1793 | 2 May 1793 | Girondins |
| | Jean-Baptiste Boyer-Fonfrède | Gironde | 2 May 1793 | 16 May 1793 | Girondins |
| | Maximin Isnard | Var | 16 May 1793 | 30 May 1793 | Girondins |
| | François René Auguste Mallarmé | Meurthe | 30 May 1793 | 13 June 1793 | The Mountain |
| | Jean-Marie Collot d'Herbois (1st term) | Paris | 13 June 1793 | 27 June 1793 | The Mountain |
| | Jacques-Alexis Thuriot de la Rosière | Marne | 27 June 1793 | 11 July 1793 | The Mountain |
| | Jean Bon Saint-André | Lot | 11 July 1793 | 25 July 1793 | The Mountain |
| | Georges Danton | Paris | 25 July 1793 | 8 August 1793 | The Mountain |
| | Marie-Jean Hérault de Séchelles (2nd term) | Seine-et-Oise | 8 August 1793 | 22 August 1793 | The Mountain |
| | Maximilien Robespierre (1st term) | Paris | 22 August 1793 | 5 September 1793 | The Mountain |
| | Jacques Nicolas Billaud-Varenne | Paris | 5 September 1793 | 19 September 1793 | The Mountain |
| | Joseph Cambon | Hérault | 19 September 1793 | 3 October 1793 | The Mountain |
| | Louis-Joseph Charlier | Marne | 3 October 1793 | 22 October 1793 | The Mountain |
| | Moyse Bayle | Bouches-du-Rhône | 22 October 1793 | 6 November 1793 | The Mountain |
| | Pierre Antoine Laloy | Haute-Marne | 6 November 1793 | 21 November 1793 | The Mountain |
| | Gilbert Romme | Puy-de-Dôme | 21 November 1793 | 6 December 1793 | The Mountain |
| | Jean-Henri Voulland | Gard | 6 December 1793 | 21 December 1793 | The Mountain |
| | Georges Couthon | Puy-de-Dôme | 21 December 1793 | 5 January 1794 | The Mountain |
| | Jacques-Louis David | Paris | 5 January 1794 | 20 January 1794 | The Mountain |
| | Marc-Guillaume-Alexis Vadier | Ariège | 20 January 1794 | 4 February 1794 | The Mountain |
| | Joseph-Nicolas Barbeau du Barran | Gers | 4 February 1794 | 19 February 1794 | The Mountain |
| | Louis Saint-Just | Aisne | 19 February 1794 | 6 March 1794 | The Mountain |
| | Philippe Rühl | Bas-Rhin | 6 March 1794 | 21 March 1794 | The Mountain |
| | Jean-Lambert Tallien | Seine-et-Oise | 21 March 1794 | 5 April 1794 | The Mountain |
| | Jean-Pierre-André Amar | Isère | 5 April 1794 | 20 April 1794 | The Mountain |
| | Jean-Baptiste-Robert Lindet | Eure | 20 April 1794 | 5 May 1794 | The Mountain |
| | Lazare Carnot | Pas-de-Calais | 5 May 1794 | 20 May 1794 | The Mountain |
| | Claude-Antoine Prieur de la Côte d'Or | Côte-d'Or | 20 May 1794 | 4 June 1794 | The Mountain |
| | Maximilien Robespierre (2nd term) | Paris | 4 June 1794 | 19 June 1794 | The Mountain |
| | Élie Lacoste | Dordogne | 19 June 1794 | 5 July 1794 | The Mountain |
| | Jean-Antoine Louis du Bas-Rhin | Bas-Rhin | 5 July 1794 | 19 July 1794 | The Mountain |
| | Jean-Marie Collot d'Herbois (2nd term) | Paris | 19 July 1794 | 3 August 1794 | The Mountain |
| | Philippe-Antoine Merlin de Douai | Nord | 3 August 1794 | 18 August 1794 | |
| | Antoine Christophe Merlin | Moselle | 18 August 1794 | 2 September 1794 | |
| | André Antoine Bernard | Charente-Inférieure | 2 September 1794 | 22 September 1794 | |
| | André Dumont | Somme | 22 September 1794 | 7 October 1794 | |
| | Jean Jacques Régis Cambacérès | Hérault | 7 October 1794 | 22 October 1794 | |
| | Pierre Louis Prieur | Marne | 22 October 1794 | 6 November 1794 | |
| | Louis Legendre | Paris | 6 November 1794 | 24 November 1794 | |
| | Jean-Baptiste Clauzel | Ariège | 24 November 1794 | 6 December 1794 | |
| | Jean-François Reubell | Haut-Rhin | 6 December 1794 | 21 December 1794 | |
| | Pierre-Louis Bentabole | Bas-Rhin | 21 December 1794 | 6 January 1795 | |
| | Étienne-François Letourneur | Manche | 6 January 1795 | 20 January 1795 | |
| | Stanislas Joseph François Xavier Rovère | Vaucluse | 20 January 1795 | 4 February 1795 | |
| | Paul Barras | Var | 4 February 1795 | 19 February 1795 | |
| | François Louis Bourdon | Oise | 19 February 1795 | 6 March 1795 | |
| | Antoine Claire Thibaudeau | Vienne | 6 March 1795 | 24 March 1795 | |
| | Jean Pelet | Lozère | 24 March 1795 | 5 April 1795 | |
| | François Antoine de Boissy d'Anglas | Ardèche | 5 April 1795 | 20 April 1795 | |
| | Emmanuel Joseph Sieyès | Sarthe | 20 April 1795 | 5 May 1795 | |
| | Théodore Vernier | Jura | 5 May 1795 | 26 May 1795 | |
| | Jean-Baptiste Charles Matthieu | Oise | 26 May 1795 | 4 June 1795 | |
| | Jean-Denis Lanjuinais | Ille-et-Vilaine | 4 June 1795 | 19 June 1795 | |
| | Jean-Baptiste Louvet de Couvrai | Loiret | 19 June 1795 | 4 July 1795 | |
| | Louis Gustave le Doulcet | Calvados | 4 July 1795 | 19 July 1795 | |
| | Louis Marie de La Révellière-Lépeaux | Maine-et-Loire | 19 July 1795 | 3 August 1795 | |
| | Pierre Claude François Daunou | Pas-de-Calais | 3 August 1795 | 19 August 1795 | |
| | Joseph Chénier | Seine-et-Oise | 19 August 1795 | 2 September 1795 | |
| | Théophile Berlier | Côte-d'Or | 2 September 1795 | 23 September 1795 | |
| | Pierre-Charles-Louis Baudin | Ardennes | 23 September 1795 | 8 October 1795 | |
| | Jean Joseph Victor Génissieu | Isère | 8 October 1795 | 26 October 1795 | |

== Presidents of the Council of Five Hundred (1795–1799) ==
Le Conseil des Cinq-Cents
| Präsident | Beginn | Ende |
|---|---|---|
| Pierre Claude François Daunou | 28 October 1795 | 21 November 1795 |
| Marie-Joseph Chénier | 22 November 1795 | 21 December 1795 |
| Jean-Baptiste Treilhard | 22 December 1795 | 20 January 1796 |
| Armand-Gaston Camus | 21 January 1796 | 19 February 1796 |
| Antoine Claire Thibaudeau | 20 February 1796 | 20 March 1796 |
| Louis Gustave le Doulcet | 21 March 1796 | 19 April 1796 |
| Aaron-Jean-François Crassous | 20 April 1796 | 19 May 1796 |
| Jacques Defermon des Chapelières | 20 May 1796 | 18 June 1796 |
| Jean Pelet (known as Pelet de la Lozère) | 19 June 1796 | 18 July 1796 |
| François Antoine de Boissy d'Anglas | 19 July 1796 | 17 August 1796 |
| Claude-Emmanuel de Pastoret | 18 August 1796 | 21 September 1796 |
| Charles-Antoine Chasset | 22 September 1796 | 21 October 1796 |
| Jean-Jacques Régis de Cambacérès | 22 October 1796 | 20 November 1796 |
| Nicolas Marie Quinette | 21 November 1796 | 20 December 1796 |
| Jean Debry | 21 December 1796 | 19 January 1797 |
| François Riou de Kersalaün | 20 January 1797 | 18 February 1797 |
| Pierre Antoine Laloy | 19 February 1797 | 20 March 1797 |
| Michel Mathieu Lecointe-Puyraveau | 21 March 1797 | 21 April 1797 |
| François Lamarque | 21 April 1797 | 19 May 1797 |
| Jean-Charles Pichegru | 20 May 1797 | 18 June 1797 |
| Pierre Henry-Larivière | 19 June 1797 | 18 July 1797 |
| Joseph-Vincent Dumolard | 19 July 1797 | 17 August 1797 |
| Joseph-Jérôme Siméon | 18 August 1797 | 21 September 1797 |
| François Lamarque (interim) | 18 August 1797 | 21 September 1797 |
| Jean-Baptiste Jourdan | 22 September 1797 | 21 October 1797 |
| François-Toussaint Villers | 22 October 1797 | 20 November 1797 |
| Emmanuel-Joseph Sieyès | 21 November 1797 | 20 December 1797 |
| Joseph Boulay de la Meurthe | 21 December 1797 | 19 January 1798 |
| Jacques-Charles Bailleul | 20 January 1798 | 18 February 1798 |
| Antoine-François Hardy | 19 February 1798 | 20 March 1798 |
| Alexis Pison du Galland | 21 March 1798 | 19 April 1798 |
| Joseph-Clément Poullain de Grandprey | 20 April 1798 | 19 May 1798 |
| Jacques Antoine Creuzé-Latouche | 20 May 1798 | 18 June 1798 |
| Marie-Joseph Chénier | 19 June 1798 | 19 July 1798 |
| Michel Mathieu Lecointe-Puyraveau | 20 July 1798 | 17 August 1798 |
| Pierre Claude François Daunou | 18 August 1798 | 21 September 1798 |
| Jean-Baptiste Jourdan | 22 September 1798 | 21 October 1798 |
| Dieudonné Dubois | 22 October 1798 | 20 November 1798 |
| Julien Savary | 21 November 1798 | 20 December 1798 |
| Théophile Berlier | 21 December 1798 | 19 January 1799 |
| Jean-Baptiste Leclerc (known as Leclerc du Maine et Loire) | 20 January 1799 | 18 February 1799 |
| Gabriel Malès | 19 February 1799 | 20 March 1799 |
| Philippe-Laurent Pons | 21 March 1799 | 19 April 1799 |
| Jean-Marie Heurtault de la Merville | 20 April 1799 | 19 May 1799 |
| Jean Debry | 20 May 1799 | 18 June 1799 |
| Jean Joseph Victor Génissieu | 19 June 1799 | 18 July 1799 |
| Jean-Baptiste Quirot | 19 July 1799 | 17 August 1799 |
| Joseph Boulay de la Meurthe | 18 August 1799 | 22 September 1799 |
| Jean-Pierre Chazal | 23 September 1799 | 22 October 1799 |
| Lucien Bonaparte | 23 October 1799 | 12 November 1799 |
| Joseph Boulay de la Meurthe | 22 November 1799 | 21 December 1799 |
| Pierre Claude François Daunou | 22 December 1799 | 26 December 1799 |
| Jean-Ignace Jacqueminot | 22 December 1799 | 26 December 1799 |

== Presidents of the Legislative Corps (1800–1814) ==
| President | Began | Ended |
|---|---|---|
| Jean-Baptiste Perrin des Vosges | 1 January 1800 | 21 January 1800 |
| Jean-Pierre Duval | 21 January 1800 | 5 February 1800 |
| Henri Jean-Baptiste Grégoire | 5 February 1800 | 20 February 1800 |
| Jean-Baptiste Girot-Pouzol | 20 February 1800 | 7 March 1800 |
| Claude Pierre Dellay d'Agier | 7 March 1800 | 22 March 1800 |
| Isaac Tarteyron | 22 March 1800 | 31 March 1800 |
| Pierre Jacques Chatry-Lafosse | 22 November 1800 | 7 December 1800 |
| Alexis Pison du Galland | 7 December 1800 | 22 December 1800 |
| Antoine Bourg-Laprade | 22 December 1800 | 6 January 1801 |
| Jean-Jacques Bréard | 6 January 1801 | 21 January 1801 |
| Jean-Francois Rossée | 21 January 1801 | 5 February 1801 |
| Jacques Poisson de Coudreville | 5 February 1801 | 20 February 1801 |
| Jean-Baptiste Leclerc, dit Leclerc du Maine et Loire | 20 February 1801 | 7 March 1801 |
| Francois Joseph Lefebvre-Cayet | 7 March 1801 | 21 March 1802 |
| Charles Francois Dupuis | 22 November 1801 | 7 December 1801 |
| Jean Francois Baraillon | 7 December 1801 | 22 December 1801 |
| Pierre Louis Lefebvre-Laroche | 22 December 1801 | 6 January 1802 |
| Nicolas-Bernard Belzais-Courménil | 6 January 1802 | 21 January 1802 |
| Joseph Pematin | 21 January 1802 | 5 February 1802 |
| Denis Couzard | 5 February 1802 | 20 February 1802 |
| Louis Ramond de Carbonnières | 20 February 1802 | 7 March 1802 |
| Jaques Devismes | 7 March 1802 | 22 March 1802 |
| Jean-Francois-Joseph Marcorelle | 5 April 1802 | 21 April 1802 |
| Francois Lobjoy | 21 April 1802 | 6 May 1802 |
| Pierre-Antoine Rabaut-Dupuis | 6 May 1802 | 20 May 1802 |
| Francois Delattre | 21 February 1803 | 7 March 1803 |
| Jean-Francois Méric | 7 March 1803 | 22 March 1803 |
| Jean-Louis Girod de L'Ain | 22 March 1803 | 6 April 1803 |
| Marie-Félix Faulcon | 6 April 1803 | 21 April 1803 |
| Vincent-Marie Viénot de Vaublanc | 21 April 1803 | 7 May 1803 |
| Francois Lagrange | 7 May 1803 | 21 May 1803 |
| Jérôme Reynaud de Lascours | 21 May 1803 | 29 May 1803 |
| Louis de Fontanes | 10 January 1804 | 24 January 1810 |
| Élisabeth-Pierre de Montesquiou-Fezensac | 24 January 1810 | 23 November 1813 |
| Claude Ambroise Régnier | 23 November 1813 | 4 June 1814 |

== President of the Chamber of Départements' Deputies (1814–1815) ==
| President | Began | Ended |
|---|---|---|
| Joseph Lainé | 11 June 1814 | 20 March 1815 |

== President of the Chamber of Representatives (4 June – 13 July 1815) ==
| President | Began | Ended |
|---|---|---|
| Jean-Denis, Comte Lanjuinais | 4 June 1815 | 13 July 1815 |

== Presidents of the Chamber of Deputies of the Departments (1815–1830) ==
| President | Began | Ended |
|---|---|---|
| Joseph Lainé | 12 October 1815 | 5 September 1816 |
| Étienne, duc Pasquier | 12 November 1816 | 13 November 1817 |
| Pierre François Hercule, comte de Serre | 13 November 1817 | 11 December 1818 |
| Auguste Ravez | 11 December 1818 | 5 November 1827 |
| Pierre Paul Royer-Collard | 25 February 1828 | 16 May 1830 |

== Presidents of the Chamber of Deputies (1830–1848) ==
| Portrait | Name | Department | Took office | Left office | Political party | Legislature (election) |
|---|---|---|---|---|---|---|
| | Casimir Pierre Perier | Aube | 6 August 1830 | 21 August 1830 | | I (1830) |
| | Jacques Laffitte | Pyrénées-Atlantiques | 21 August 1830 | 11 November 1830 | | I (1830) |
| | Casimir Pierre Perier | Aube | 11 November 1830 | 31 May 1831 | | I (1830) |
| | Louis Gaspard Amédée | Indre-et-Loire | 1 August 1831 | 28 April 1832 | | II (1831) |
| | André Marie Dupin | Nièvre | 29 April 1832 | 2 February 1839 | | II (1831) · III (1834) · IV (1837) |
| | Hippolyte Passy | Eure | 16 April 1839 | 12 May 1839 | | V (1839) |
| | Paul Sauzet | Rhône | 24 December 1839 | 24 February 1848 | | V (1839) · VI (1842) · VII (1846) |

== Presidents of the National Constituent Assembly (1848–1849) ==
| President | Began | Ended |
|---|---|---|
| Philippe Joseph Benjamin Buchez | 5 May 1848 | 5 June 1848 |
| Antoine Marie Jules Sénard | 5 June 1848 | 29 June 1848 |
| Pierre Marie de Saint-Georges | 29 June 1848 | 19 July 1848 |
| Armand Marrast | 19 July 1848 | 26 May 1849 |

== President of the National Legislative Assembly (1849–1852) ==
| President | Began | Ended |
|---|---|---|
| André Marie Dupin | 1 June 1849 | 2 December 1851 |

== Presidents of the Legislative Corps (1852–1870) ==
| Portrait | Name | Took office | Left office | Political party | Legislature (election) |
|---|---|---|---|---|---|
| | Adolphe Billault | 9 March 1852 | 12 November 1854 | Bonapartist | I |
| | Charles, duc de Morny | 12 November 1854 | 10 March 1865 | Bonapartist | I · II · III |
| | Alexandre, comte Walewski | 1 September 1865 | 29 March 1867 | Bonapartist | III |
| | Eugène Schneider | 2 April 1867 | 4 September 1870 | Bonapartist | III · IV |

== Presidents of the Chamber of Deputies (1871–1940) ==
| Portrait | Name | Took office | Left office | Political party |
|---|---|---|---|---|
| | Jules Grévy (1st term) | 16 February 1871 | 2 April 1873 | Left Republican |
| | Louis Buffet | 4 April 1873 | 15 March 1875 | Conservative (Moderate Monarchist) |
| | Gaston Audiffret-Pasquier | 15 March 1875 | 6 March 1876 | Conservative (Moderate Monarchist) |
| | Jules Grévy (1st term) (provisional to 13 March 1876) | 8 March 1876 | 31 January 1879 | Left Republican |
| | Léon Gambetta | 31 January 1879 | 3 November 1881 | Opportunist Republican |
| | Henri Brisson (1st term) | 3 November 1881 | 8 April 1885 | Radical Republican |
| | Charles Floquet (1st term) | 8 April 1885 | 4 April 1888 | Radical Republican |
| | Jules Méline | 4 April 1888 | 16 November 1889 | Left Republican |
| | Charles Floquet (2nd term) | 16 November 1889 | 16 January 1893 | Radical Republican |
| | Jean Casimir-Perier (1st term) | 16 January 1893 | 5 December 1895 | Left Republican |
| | Charles Dupuy | 5 December 1893 | 2 June 1894 | Left Republican |
| | Jean Casimir-Perier (2nd term) | 2 June 1894 | 5 July 1894 | Left Republican |
| | Auguste Burdeau | 5 July 1894 | 12 December 1894 | Left Republican |
| | Henri Brisson (2nd term) | 18 December 1894 | 9 June 1898 | Radical Republican |
| | Paul Deschanel (1st term) | 9 June 1898 | 10 June 1902 | Democratic Republican Alliance |
| | Léon Bourgeois | 10 June 1902 | 12 January 1904 | Radical Socialist Party |
| | Henri Brisson (3rd term) | 12 January 1904 | 10 January 1905 | Radical Socialist Party |
| | Paul Doumer | 10 January 1905 | 8 June 1906 | Radical Socialist Party |
| | Henri Brisson (4th term) | 8 June 1906 | 23 May 1912 | Radical Socialist Party |
| | Paul Deschanel (2nd term) | 23 May 1912 | 12 February 1920 | Democratic Alliance |
| | Raoul Péret (1st term) | 12 February 1920 | 9 June 1924 | Democratic Alliance |
| | Paul Painlevé | 9 June 1924 | 22 April 1925 | Republican-Socialist Party |
| | Édouard Herriot (1st term) | 22 April 1925 | 22 July 1926 | Radical Socialist Party |
| | Raoul Péret (2nd term) | 22 July 1926 | 11 January 1927 | Democratic Alliance |
| | Fernand Bouisson | 11 January 1927 | 31 May 1936 | Republican-Socialist Party |
| | Édouard Herriot (2nd term) | 4 June 1936 | 9 July 1940 | Radical Socialist Party |

== President of the Consultative Assembly (1943–1945) ==
| Portrait | Name | Took office | Left office | Political party | Legislature (election) |
|---|---|---|---|---|---|
| | Félix Gouin | 9 November 1943 | 8 November 1945 | SFIO | Provisional |

== Presidents of the Constituent National Assembly (1945–1946) ==
| Portrait | Name | Took office | Left office | Political party | Legislature (election) |
|---|---|---|---|---|---|
| | Félix Gouin | 8 November 1945 | 22 January 1946 | SFIO | I (1945) |
| | Vincent Auriol | 31 January 1946 | 27 November 1946 | SFIO | II (Jun.1946) |

== Presidents of the National Assembly, Fourth Republic (1946–1958) ==
| Portrait | Name | Department | Took office | Left office | Political party | Legislature (election) |
|---|---|---|---|---|---|---|
| | Vincent Auriol | Haute-Garonne | 3 December 1946 | 21 January 1947 | SFIO | I (Nov.1946) |
| | Édouard Herriot | Rhône | 21 January 1947 | 12 January 1954 | Radical | I (Nov.1946) |
| | Édouard Herriot | Rhône | 21 January 1947 | 12 January 1954 | Radical | II (1951) |
| | André Le Troquer (1st term) | Seine | 12 January 1954 | 11 January 1955 | SFIO | II (1951) |
| | Pierre Schneiter | Marne | 11 January 1955 | 24 January 1956 | MRP | II (1951) |
| | André Le Troquer (2nd term) | Seine | 24 January 1956 | 9 December 1958 | SFIO | III (1956) |

== Presidents of the National Assembly, Fifth Republic (1958–present) ==
| Portrait | Name | Department | Took office | Left office | Political party | Legislature (election) |
|---|---|---|---|---|---|---|
| | Jacques Chaban-Delmas (1st term) | Gironde | 9 December 1958 | 25 June 1969 | UNR; UDR | I (1958) · II (1962) · III (1967) · IV (1968) |
| | Achille Peretti | Hauts-de-Seine | 25 June 1969 | 2 April 1973 | UDR | IV (1968) |
| | Edgar Faure | Doubs | 2 April 1973 | 3 April 1978 | UDR; RPR | V (1973) |
| | Jacques Chaban-Delmas (2nd term) | Gironde | 3 April 1978 | 2 July 1981 | RPR | VI (1978) |
| | Louis Mermaz | Isère | 2 July 1981 | 2 April 1986 | PS | VII (1981) |
| | Jacques Chaban-Delmas (3rd term) | Gironde | 2 April 1986 | 23 June 1988 | RPR | VIII (1986) |
| | Laurent Fabius (1st term) | Seine-Maritime | 23 June 1988 | 22 January 1992 | PS | IX (1988) |
| | Henri Emmanuelli | Landes | 22 January 1992 | 2 April 1993 | PS | IX (1988) |
| | Philippe Séguin | Vosges | 2 April 1993 | 12 June 1997 | RPR | X (1993) |
| | Laurent Fabius (2nd term) | Seine-Maritime | 12 June 1997 | 29 March 2000 | PS | XI (1997) |
| | Raymond Forni | Territoire de Belfort | 29 March 2000 | 25 June 2002 | PS | XI (1997) |
| | Jean-Louis Debré | Eure | 25 June 2002 | 2 March 2007 | UMP | XII (2002) |
| | Patrick Ollier | Hauts-de-Seine | 7 March 2007 | 19 June 2007 | UMP | XII (2002) |
| | Bernard Accoyer | Haute-Savoie | 26 June 2007 | 19 June 2012 | UMP | XIII (2007) |
| | Claude Bartolone | Seine-Saint-Denis | 26 June 2012 | 20 June 2017 | PS | XIV (2012) |
| | François de Rugy | Loire-Atlantique | 27 June 2017 | 4 September 2018 | REM | XV (2017) |
| | Richard Ferrand | Finistère | 12 September 2018 | 21 June 2022 | REM | XV (2017) |
| | Yaël Braun-Pivet | Yvelines | 28 June 2022 | Incumbent | REM | XVI (2022) · XVII (2024) |
