= Emmanuel Marie Michel Philippe Fréteau de Saint-Just =

French nobleman

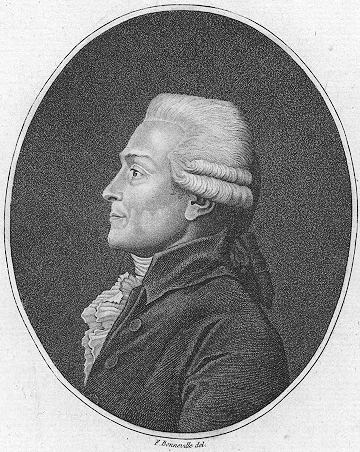
Fréteau de Saint-Just

Emmanuel Marie Michel Philippe Fréteau de Saint-Just (28 March 1745 – 14 June 1794) was a French nobleman and an elected representative of the Second Estate during the French Revolution. He was a politically liberal deputy to the Estates-General of 1789 and worked for the cause of constitutional monarchy. In 1789, Fréteau de Saint-Just served two terms as president of the National Constituent Assembly.

As the Revolution became more radical, Fréteau de Saint-Just became politically marginalized, and by 1792 he had retired from national politics completely. Nonetheless, his aristocratic background drew increasing ire from militant revolutionaries until he was finally arrested and executed at the guillotine in 1794 during the Reign of Terror.

== Biography ==
Fréteau de Saint-Just was Seigneur of Vaux-le-Pénil and Saint-Liesne, estates located just outside Paris, acquired by his grandfather Héracle Freteau de Saint-Just in 1728, and on which his father erected the castle which still exists today. He married Marie Josèphe Perrine Moreau de Plancy (1756–1829) in Paris on 23 January 1775. They had four children:

- Emmanuel Jean-Baptiste Freteau (5 November 1775 – July 1855), baron of Peny, lawyer at the court of cassation, peer of France, officer of the Legion of Honor.
- Octavie (1780–1875), married in 1814 to Andre-Guy-Victor, Viscount de la Hamel (1776–1838).
- Edeline Louise (1789 – 20 November 1838), countess of the Empire, married, 5 April 1809 in Kassel, to Jean-Baptiste, baron Eblé (1757–1812), general under Napoleon Bonaparte.
- Philippine Sophie (1795 – 30 March 1873), married to Guy Emmanuel Le Gentil (1784–1840), 3rd marquess of Paroy.

== French Revolution ==
Fréteau was already a renowned jurist long before the outset of the French Revolution. As advisor to the Parlement of Paris, he supported the resistance of parlements to the attempted absolutist reforms, first against Chancellor Maupeou from 1770 to 1774 (along with such future éminences grise of the Revolution as Target and François Denis Tronchet), and again against Lomenie de Brienne, the last Finance Minister of the ancien régime, in 1787. This act of protest earned him a period of imprisonment at Doullens in 1788.

However, it was his fame that caused the liberal nobility of the region of Melun, hostile to the Court, to give him their votes in the spring 1789. He was elected by the bailiwicks of Melun and Moret-sur-Loing by the Second Estate to the Estates General 20 March 1789. Once at Versailles, he quickly joined the liberal nobles such as the marquis de Lafayette and the comte de Clermont-Tonnerre who wanted to challenge absolutism and combine the three orders in a National Assembly.

He was a strong supporter of the constitutional monarchy, and it was he who proposed to give the King the title of "King of the French". He twice served early on as president of the National Assembly (10–28 October 1789; 5–22 December 1789).

== Reign of Terror ==
After the attack on the Tuileries by the mobs of Paris (10 August 1792), in disagreement with the new direction taken by the Revolution, and in protest of the impending abolition of the French monarchy, he departed to his estates of Vaux-le-Le Penil. He continued to participate actively in the life of his commune, but fell under suspicion and was arrested during the Terror.

Acquitted a first time, thanks in part to the supportive testimonies from his fellow citizens, he was nevertheless dispatched to the guillotine on 26 Prairial II (14 June 1794).
