= Jean-Baptiste-Charles Chabroud =

French politician

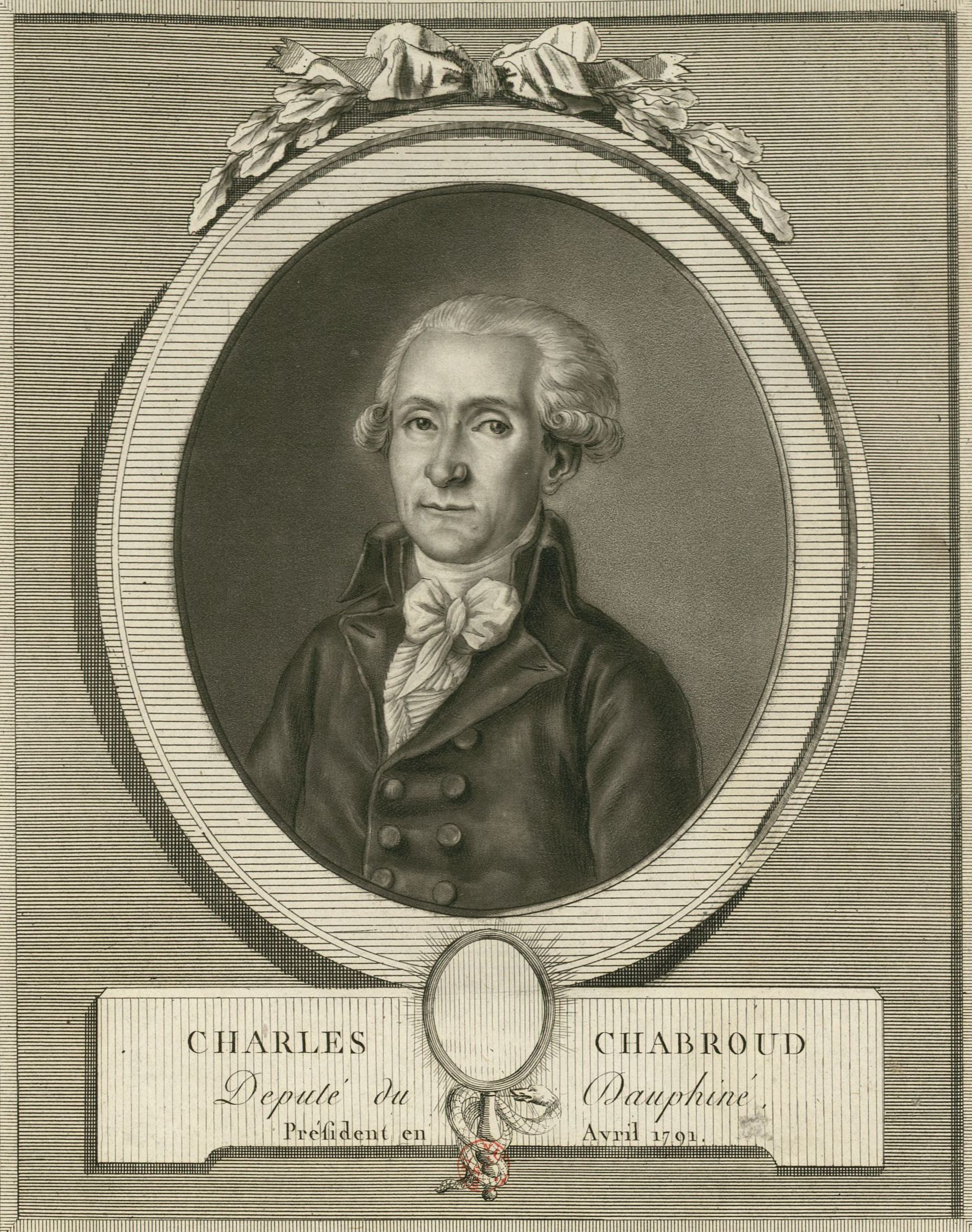
- Portrait of Charles Chabroud made by Pierre-Michel Alix after a drawing by Jean-Baptiste Ponce Lambert

President of the National Constituent Assembly
- In office 9 April 1791 – 23 April 1791
- Preceded by: François Denis Tronchet
- Succeeded by: Jean-François Rewbell

Personal details
- Born: 5 March 1750 Vienne, Isère
- Died: 1 February 1816 (aged 65) Paris
- Occupation: Lawyer

Jean-Baptiste-Charles Chabroud (5 March 1750 in Vienne, Isère – 1 February 1816 in Paris), better known as Charles Chabroud, was a French lawyer and politician.

== Biography ==
Chabroud worked as a lawyer in Vienne, Isère. On 4 January 1789 he was elected to the Estates General by the province of Dauphiné.

He was in charge of the report of the file processed by the Châtelet upon the events of 5-6 October. The Duke of Orléans and the Count of Mirabeau were implicated by the report, but were exonerated by the National Constituent Assembly after a vivid discussion.

On 9 April 1790 Chabroud was called to the presidency of the Constituent Assembly.

On 4 March 1791 he was named a deputy to the Court of Cassation for the Isère department. He sat in the Court of Cassation until Year V, then he moved to Paris and became a consulting lawyer in the Court of Cassation, the Cour des prises and the Council of State on 8 July 1806.

== Published works ==
- Opinions sur quelques questions relatives à l'ordre judiciaire (1790)
- Rapport sur la procédure du Châtelet sur l'affaire des 5 et 6 octobre (1790)

== See also ==
- List of presidents of the National Assembly of France

== Bibliography ==
- "Jean-Baptiste-Charles Chabroud", in Adolphe Robert and Gaston Cougny, Dictionnaire des parlementaires français (1789–1891), Bourloton, Paris, 1889 Edition details Wikisource
