= Charles François =

Charles François may refer to:

- Charles François (systems scientist) (1922–2019), Belgian administrator, editor and systems scientist
- Charles François (kickboxer) (born 1986), French Muay Thai kickboxer
- Charles François, Marquis de Bonnay (1750–1825), French military, diplomatic, and political figure of the French Revolution
