= Bon-Albert Briois de Beaumetz =

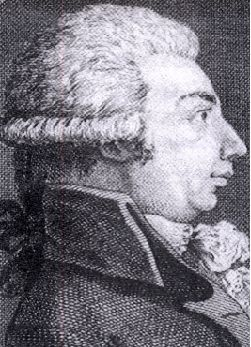
A portrait of Bon Albert Briois de Beaumetz

Bon Albert Briois de Beaumetz or Beaumez (23 December 1755 - 1801?) was a French statesman of the French Revolution. He is noteworthy as a conservative nobleman who nevertheless committed to serve the constitutional monarchy of the Constitution of 1791.

== Biography ==
Born in Arras, Albert de Beaumetz was the son of an ardent royalist and a premier président of the Superior Council of Artois, a judiciary body of the ancien régime. In 1785, Beaumetz succeeded his father at the Council of Artois and became himself a distinguished personality. He was the lover of Jeanne Louise Henriette Genest Campan, a lady-in-waiting for Marie Antoinette.

Each week, he entertained at his home the most important figures of the bar of Arras. It was to one of these meetings, in which the election campaign for the Estates General of 1789 was planned, that Maximilien Robespierre, member of the Artesian bar, was not invited. It revived an animosity between the erstwhile friends.

== French Revolution ==
In the elections to the Estates General, Bon Albert de Beaumetz was elected as a member by the Second Estate of the Artois, while Maximilien Robespierre managed to get elected by the Third Estate. In the subsequent National Constituent Assembly, Beaumetz sat on the right side with conservatives such as the comte de Clermont-Tonnerre, yet is moderate in his conservatism. His interventions are many. He opted for the meeting of the three orders, called for the abolition of torture in the judicial procedure and requested the emission of 800 million assignat.

After the close of the session of the Constituent Assembly in 1791, he became with Charles-Maurice of Talleyrand-Périgord a member of the directory of the department of the Seine. He tried in vain to put a brake on the rise of revolutionary violence, much more than his friend and colleague, the Bishop of Autun. He was, in spite of everything, the origin of the counter-revolutionary measures which this body had taken.

== Émigré ==
After the day of fall of the French Monarchy (10 August 1792), Beaumetz emigrated, first to Germany, and then to England, where he found his friend Charles-Maurice of Talleyrand-Périgord in the spring of 1794. They traveled together to the United States. Having married the daughter of first United States Secretary of War Henry Knox, he was naturalised as an American citizen. In May 1796, accompanied by his wife, he travelled to India and was installed in Calcutta where he disappeared from history after a last letter sent by him in March 1801.
