= Joseph-Henri baron de Jessé =

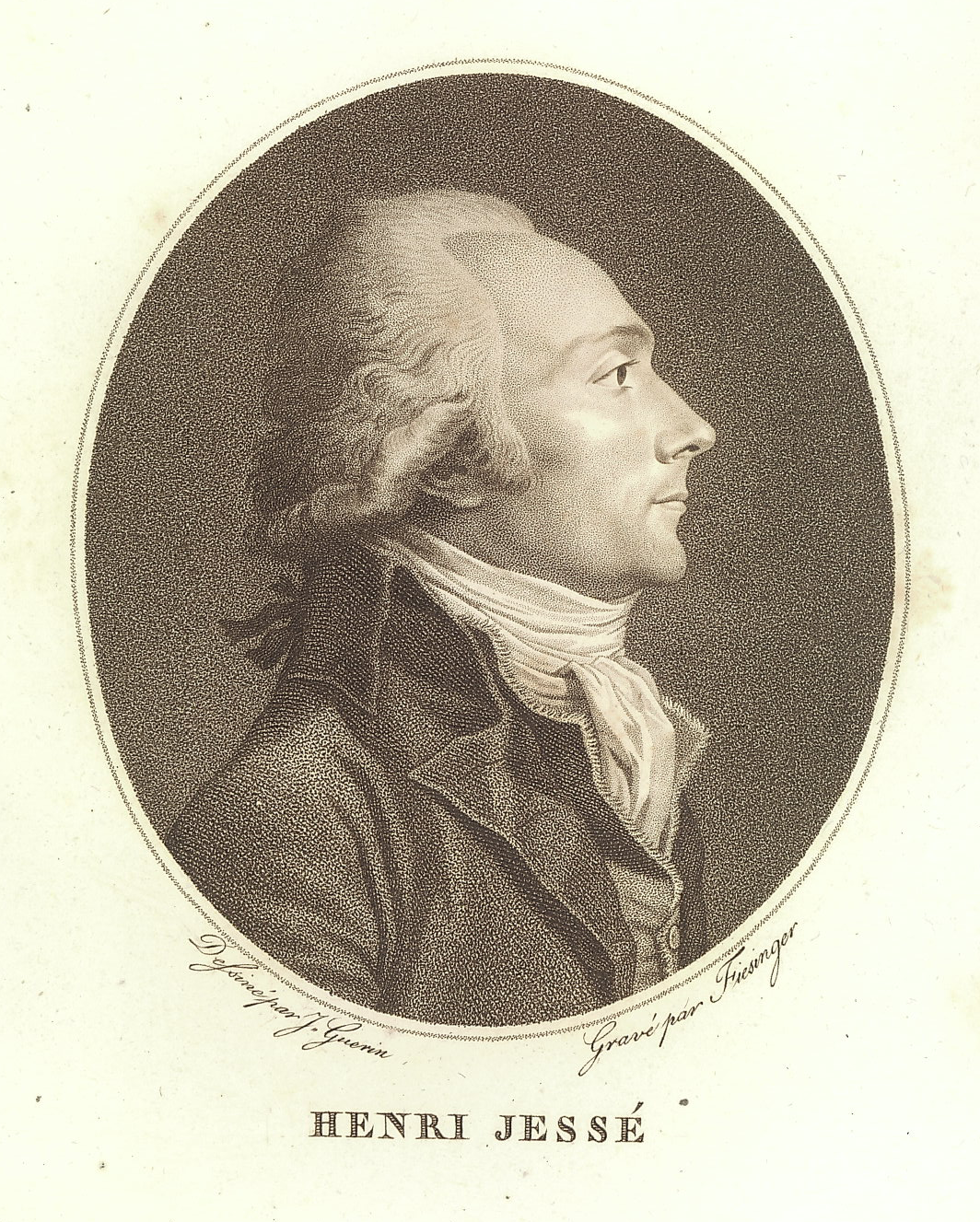

President of French National Constituent Assembly
- In office 30 August 1790 – 10 September 1790
- Preceded by: Pierre Samuel du Pont de Nemours
- Succeeded by: Jean-Xavier Bureau de Pusy

Personal details
- Born: 21 August 1755 Béziers (Hérault), France
- Died: 6 February 1794 (aged 38) Paris, France
- Spouse: Madeleine Rousset de Saint-Eloi
- Children: Pauline de Jessé; Antoine de Jessé

Joseph-Henri baron de Jessé (1755–1794) was a French nobleman and government official, who served as president of the French National Constituent Assembly from 30 August 1790 to 10 September 1790.

== Early life and family ==
Joseph-Henri de Jessé was born in Béziers, in the Hérault department of France, on 21 August 1755. Some sources give his year of birth as 1746, but most record it as 1755. His father was Antoine-Joseph Jessé baron de Levas (c1715-1794), Aide-Major of the Coastal Guard, and his mother was Marie-Charlotte de Nizeaux (died 1762). He had one sister, Victoire de Jessé.

He was a captain in the cavalry regiment Royal Picardie, the regiment having been reinstated under the military reforms of December 1762. France at that time was still an autocracy based on the divine right of kings. This meant the whole country belonged to the monarch, whose government was one of rights rather than obligations. The French nobility had certain privileges, with the rank of officer in the army and navy being restricted to those with at least two generations of nobility on either side.

He married Madeleine Rousset de Saint-Eloi, on 22 February 1788. They had two children, Pauline de Jessé and Antoine de Jessé. Antoine served in the Garde du Corps of Louis XVIII, before giving up his military career in 1817 to devote himself to journalism, literature and good works; he died in December 1854.

== French Revolution ==
By the late 1780s France was in a dire financial situation, the royal coffers having been declared insolvent in 1786. In the year 1788, 49% of the national income was spent on paying the interest on outstanding loans.

On 24 January 1789, the Estates-General was reluctantly convoked by King Louis XVI for the first time since 1614.

On 26 March 1789 Jessé was elected to the Estates-General by the sénéchaussée Béziers, to serve as a deputy of the nobility.

The Estates-General soon reached a deadlock. The Third Estate, or Commoners, broke away during June and formed its own assembly. Jessé was amongst those who helped persuade the three orders of Clergy, Nobility and Commoners to eventually reunite and form the National Constituent Assembly, which was declared on 9 July 1789.

The Bastille was stormed, and fell on 14 July 1789. The people of Paris believed that weapons and gunpowder were being stored in the Bastille, and fearing the city was about to be placed under military occupation by soldiers loyal to the King, the people decided to storm and occupy the fortress.

Jessé was admitted to sit in the National Constituent Assembly on 7 August 1789, as a replacement for the Marquis de Gayon, who had resigned.

He sided with the moderates and conservatives. When debating the newly drafted Declaration of the Rights of Man and of the Citizen, which was adopted by the National Assembly on 27 August 1789, Jessé had tried to convince the Assembly to abandon the principle of resistance to oppression. He also proposed that large quantities of silverware owned by the French Church should be melted down to provide funds for the relief of the poor.

In 1790 Jessé objected to the proposed annexation of Avignon with France. Avignon had risen up and imposed the election of a new municipality: it expelled its papal vice-legate on 17 June 1790, and demanded its integration with France. The National Assembly twice refused to ratify the annexation: on 22 August and 20 November 1790.

Jessé continued to vote with the supporters of the Old Regime.

In March 1791, Jessé proposed that only the King should have the power to appoint government ministers. A new constitution was accepted by King Louis XVI in September 1791, and he was renamed 'King of the French'. Under the new constitution, Louis could appoint ministers but the legislature could remove them; he was not able to propose laws and had a veto which only blocked legislation for a maximum of three years.

From late 1791 onwards, Jessé campaigned for the rights of émigrés, and the protection of their property. Émigrés were French royalists who fled the country to escape the Revolution of 1789. From the safety of their self-imposed exile abroad, many émigrés conspired against the Revolutionary government. The Revolutionary leaders decreed that émigrés who failed to return to France by January 1792 would be declared to be traitors and would be sentenced to death in their absence. In October 1792 the state imposed perpetual banishment on all émigrés, and formally confiscated their property.

As the Revolution progressed, Jessé argued that France should become a constitutional monarchy, rather than a Republic. However, the monarchy was formally abolished on 21 September 1792, and King Louis XVI was executed in January 1793.

The Reign of Terror began on 5 September 1793, with aristocrats and conservatives being deemed enemies of the state. Jessé was eventually arrested and incarcerated at Moulins. He was then transferred to the Conciergerie in Paris, where he died of typhus on 6 February 1794, the day before he was due to be guillotined. His father also died in 1794, having been imprisoned with his family during the Terror. His father was arrested despite both his advanced age and the popularity he enjoyed among his countrymen.

== See also ==
- French Revolution
- List of presidents of the National Assembly of France
- Old Regime and the Revolution
- Ancien Régime in France
