= Thouret =

Thouret may refer to:

- Jacques Guillaume Thouret (1746-1794), prominent politician during the early part of the French revolution, guillotined in 1794.
- Nikolaus Friedrich von Thouret (1767-1845), German architect.
