= Claude-Emmanuel de Pastoret =

French lawyer, author and politician (1755–1840)

Marquess Claude-Emmanuel de Pastoret
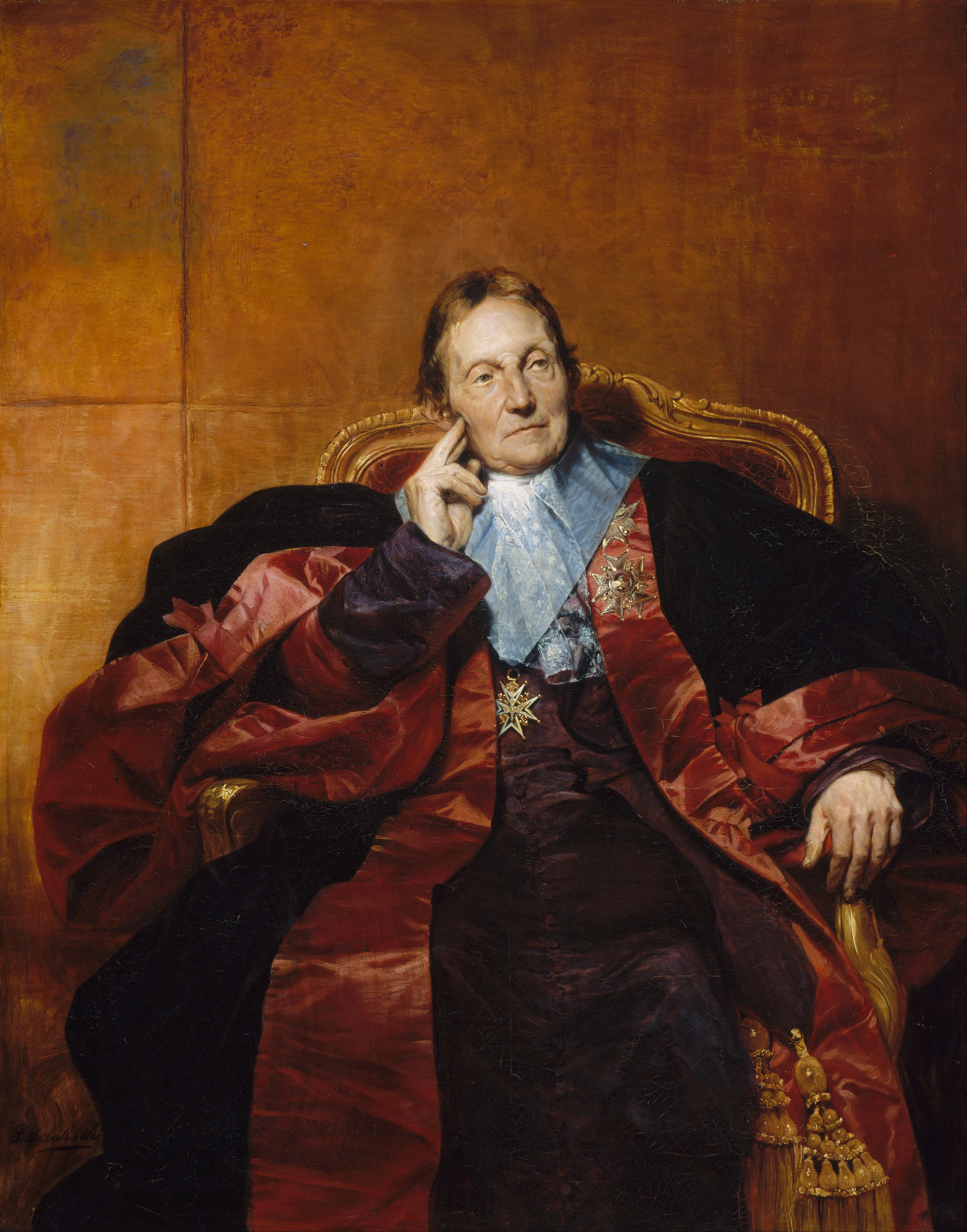
- Marquis de Pastoret by Paul Delaroche (1829)

President of the Chamber of Peers Lord Chancellor of France
- In office 17 December 1829 – 3 August 1830
- Monarch: Charles X
- Preceded by: Charles Dambray
- Succeeded by: Étienne-Denis Pasquier

President of the Council of Five Hundred
- In office 18 August 1796 – 21 September 1796
- Preceded by: Boissy d'Anglas
- Succeeded by: Charles Antoine Chasset

Member of the Legislative Assembly for Seine
- In office 1 October 1791 – 20 September 1792
- Succeeded by: Jean-Marie Collot d'Herbois
- Constituency: Paris

Personal details
- Born: 24 December 1755 Marseille, France
- Died: 28 September 1840 (aged 84) Paris, France
- Party: Feuillant (1791–1793); Marais (1794–1796); Ultra-royalist (1815–1830)
- Education: Aix-Marseille University
- Profession: Author, lawyer, teacher
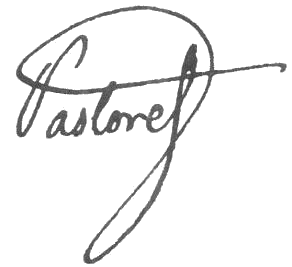
- Signature

Claude-Emmanuel Joseph Pierre, Marquess of Pastoret (24 December 1755, in Marseille – 28 September 1840, in Paris) was a French lawyer, author and politician.

== Biography ==
Pastoret was elected member of the Académie des Inscriptions et Belles Lettres on the strength of his "Zoroastre, Confucius et Mahomet comparés comme sectaires, legislateurs et moralistes". He was Venerable Master of "Les Neuf Sœurs" (A Parisian Freemason chapter) from 1788 till 1789.

In 1790 Claude-Emannuel Pastoret, then president of the Parisian electoral body to the National Assembly, was offered the offices of Minister of Interior and Minister of Justice by the desperate King Louis XVI. He declined the honours and was elected "procureur géneral syndic du département de la Seine". It was in that capacity that he was responsible for the transformation of the église Sainte-Génevieve into a temple for the remains of great citizens of the new state were to be honoured: the Panthéon, Paris.

In the National Assembly (French Revolution), he pleaded for the abolition of slavery and the secularisation of the civil state, but he was not a deputy.

Elected to the Legislative Assembly by the electors of Paris (September 1791), he was honoured as the first deputy to be elected President (3–17 October 1791). It was common for intellectuals to be elected to public office, and he joined such noteworthies as Condorcet. He most frequently allied himself with the constitutionalist faction and was highly respected by the opponent Girondist faction. He would undertake a variety of projects during the course of the Assembly, including requesting repressive measures against émigrés, the abolition of the New Year address to the Crown and the deletion of the purely honorific designations (and a more egalitarian form of social address). He voted for the abolition of the University of Paris and made a long speech to propose to raise a "statue of liberty" on the ruins of the Bastille. However, he realised, as time went by, that the reforms that he had been the first to demand increasingly threatened the royal authority he was trying to protect.

Several times, he went up to the rostrum to separate the cause of Louis XVI from that of the advisors to the Crown, and he denounced the Protests of 20 June 1792. After the fall of the French Monarchy (10 August 1792), to secure his own safety, he fled to Provence and then into the Savoy region, from where he returned only after the fall of Robespierre (9 Thermidor II, or 27 July 1794).

Elected by Var to the Council of Five Hundred and called, a few days later (6 December 1795), at the institute, he took his place in the Council among the moderates when he spoke in favor of the freedom of the press, the fugitive priests and parents of émigrés. He also defended royalists and asked that for the remains of Montesquieu to be transferred to the Panthéon, proposed the closure of the popular societies and accused the Directors Barras, Rewbell and La Révellière of fomenting unrest and attracting the hatred of the people on the assembly.

In 1795, he managed to cancel the condemnation to death in-absentia on his friend, the comte de Vaublanc, (who would be the ultra-royalist Minister of the Interior in 1816), because of his involvement in the royalist insurrection of 13 Vendémiaire IV (5 October 1795). In the end, they both fell from grace and were forced to flee into exile together after a sentence of exile was passed against them following the coup d'état of 18 Fructidor V 4 September 1797).

Under Napoleon's First French Empire, he worked on a university career. Under Louis XVIII, he was awarded a French peerage for his extensive work on the Constitutional Charter.

In 1830, he refused to vow loyalty to Louis-Philippe and was deprived of all his functions.

His written works include a "Traité des lois pénales" and an impressive "Histoire de la législation" (11 vol.).
