= Jean Baptiste Treilhard =

French statesman (1742–1810)

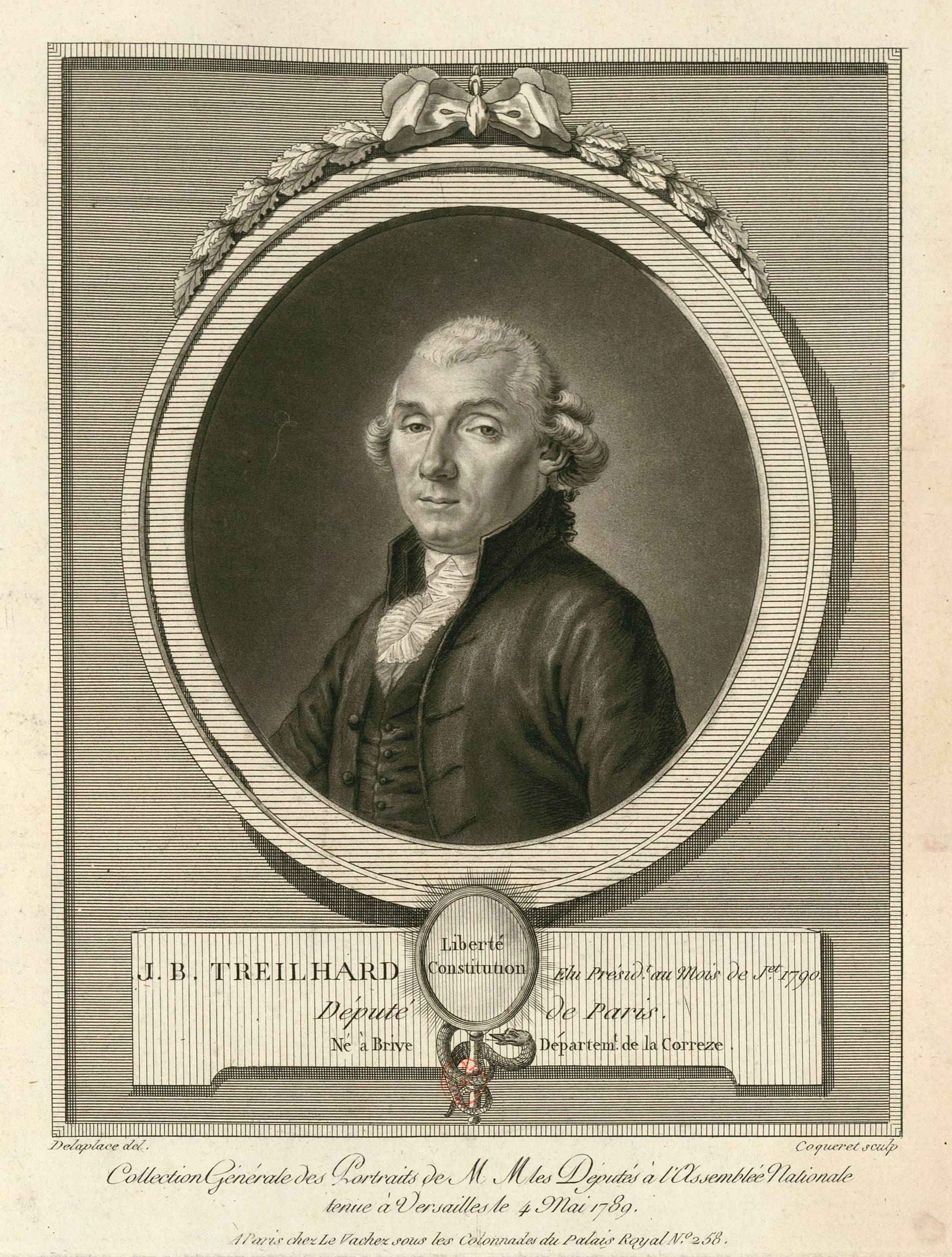

8th President of the National Convention
- In office 27 December 1792 – 10 January 1793
- Preceded by: Jacques Defermon
- Succeeded by: Pierre Victurnien Vergniaud

Personal details
- Born: 3 January 1742 Brive-la-Gaillarde, Kingdom of France
- Died: 1 December 1810 (aged 68) Paris, France
- Resting place: Panthéon, Paris
- Political party: Girondins
- Children: Achille Libéral Treilhard
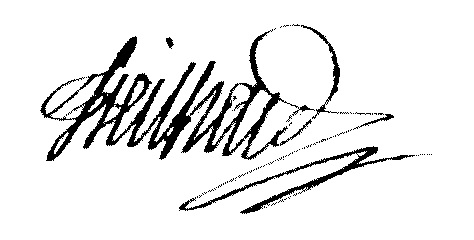
- Signature

Jean-Baptiste Treilhard (French pronunciation: [ʒɑ̃ batist tʁɛjaʁ]; 3 January 1742 – 1 December 1810) was an important French statesman of the revolutionary period. He passed through the troubled times of the Republic and Empire with great political savvy, playing a decisive role at important times.

Without achieving the notoriety of some of his more famous revolutionary colleagues, he held a number of key positions - President of the National Constituent Assembly (20 July - 1 August 1790), President of the National Convention (27 December 1792 – 10 January 1793, coinciding with the trial of Louis XVI, three-time member of the Committee of Public Safety (7 April 1793 – 12 June 1793; 31 July 1794 - 5 November 1794; 4 May 1795 – 2 August 1795), chairman of the Council of Five Hundred, member of the French Directory.

Eugene Marbeau describes Jean-Baptiste Treilhard as "a man honest and right, who is content to do his duty in the situation... but who does not seek... to dominate events". He is buried at the Panthéon.

== Biography ==
Born in Brive-la-Gaillarde, Corrèze, to a father who was a lawyer at the Présidial and maire perpétuel of Brive.

Jean Baptiste was a student at the collège des doctrinaires (now the Hôtel de Ville) at Brive, where he received an education balancing the requirements of science and faith.

After studies in law, Jean-Baptiste Treilhard settled in Paris and became, in 1761, a lawyer at the Parlement. He was a protégé of Turgot, future Controller-General of Finances (24 August 1774 – 12 May 1776) to Louis XVI. Treilhard was retained to care for judicial affairs of the Condé family.

== French Revolution ==
Treilhard was elected deputy by the Third Estate of Paris to the Estates-General of 1789, then to the National Constituent Assembly. His most important early role was in the Comité ecclésiastique (Ecclesiastical Committee) where he took the lead in promoting the Civil Constitution of the Clergy, a major reorganization of the Roman Catholic Church (including the suppression of its monasteries and the nationalization of its property). He served one term as President of the National Constituent Assembly (20 July - 1 August 1790).

Ineligible, like all the members of the Constituent Assembly, for the Legislative Assembly, he became president of the criminal tribunal of Paris, but was judged as lacking of firmness.

Elected to the National Convention by the department of Seine-et-Oise, Treilhard was President (27 December 1792 – 10 January 1794) of the National Convention, and in this capacity served as first magistrate during a part of the trial of Louis XVI, in which he voted for death without reprieve.

He was an inaugural member of the Committee of Public Safety (7 April 1793 – 12 June 1793), but was excluded by the Montagnard. He was imprisoned, but would survive the Reign of Terror. On 31 July 1794, after 9 Thermidor Year II (27 July 1794), he returned to the Committee until 5 November 1794. He would serve again from 4 May to 2 August 1795.

Treilhard served on three missions:

- 17 June - 7 August 1793: to Gironde and Lot-et-Garonne, with fellow deputy Mathieu.
- 22 September - 25 November 1793: to Marly (Seine-et-Oise, today Yvelines), with Auguis and Enlart
- 30 December 1794 – 4 April 1795: to Bec-d'Ambes (Gironde) and again the Lot-et-Garonne

== Directory ==
Chairman of the Council of Five Hundred in the month of Nivôse, Year IV (22 December 1795 – 23 January 1796). In his speech from 1 Pluviose year IV (21 January 1796), he delivered a speech on the third anniversary of the execution of Louis XVI, in which he execrated monarchy.

In 1795, he arranged the exchange of the daughter of Louis XVI, Marie Thérèse of France, future Duchess of Angoulême, who was a prisoner of the Republic since autumn 1792, for the commissioners to armies betrayed by the general Dumoriez and turned over to the Austrians in spring 1793.

After refusing an appointment as ambassador to Naples in 1796, he served as a judge of the Court of Cassation (6 September - 23 October 1797), before the Directory of France appointed him minister plenipotentiary at the Congress of Rastadt in December 1797).

Treilhard became one of five Directors, the chief executive body of France, 15 May 1798 (26 Floréal year VI) in replacement of François de Neufchâteau. He chaired the Directory 24 August - 27 November 1798.

On 17 June 1799, his election as a member of the Executive Board is invalidated by a resolution of the Council of Ancients, on the grounds of ineligibility due to an irregularity in the election. He is succeeded by Louis-Jérôme Gohier.

== Consulate and Empire ==
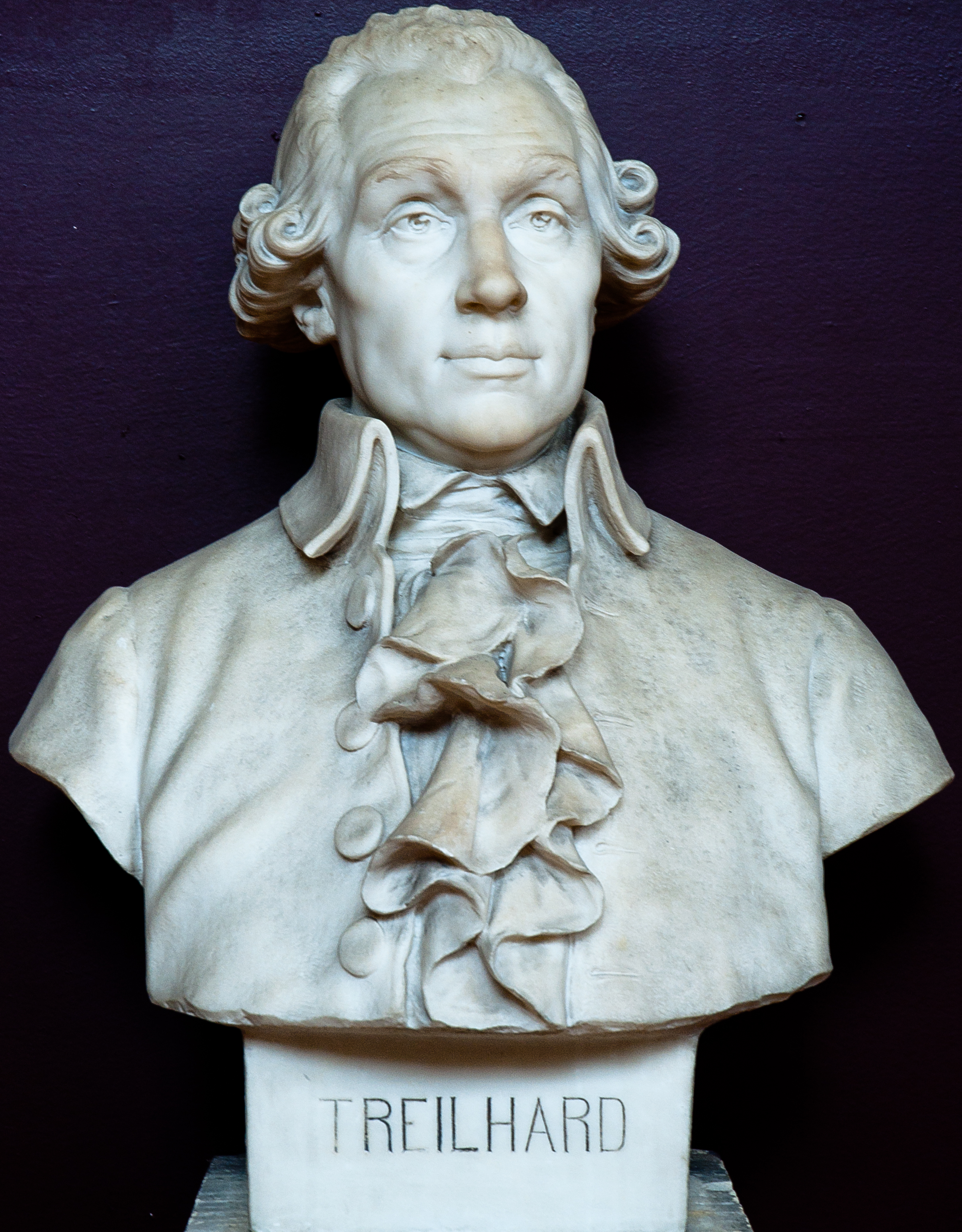
Buste de Jean-Baptiste Treilhard -- Salle du serment du jeu de paume -- Versailles

After the coup of 18 Brumaire (10 November 1799), during the Consulate, he was appointed on 4 April 1800 vice-president of the court of appeal of the department of the Seine, and became its president on 1 January 1802. He chaired the legislative section of the Council of State, in 1802, and participated in the drafting of the French Civil Code, the Criminal Code and the Code of commerce in close collaboration with Tronchet and Portalis. He also served as a senator.

He collected such honours as being named Grand Officer of the Legion of Honor 14 June 1804, and comte de l'Empire 24 April 1808.

On 30 March 1809 he is named to the Council of State, a position he held until his death.

As officer of the Empire, he is buried at the Panthéon 5 December 1810.

Under the Directory, he entered the Council of Five Hundred, of which he was president during the month of Nivôse, Year IV, and was a member of the Court of Cassation, as well plenipotentiary at the Second Congress of Rastatt (December 1797). Treilhard became a director in the year VI.

== Bibliography ==
- 1789 - Opinion de M. Treilhard, sur le rapport du Comite des finances, du 18 decembre 1789, au sujet de la Caisse d'escompte; et motion sur l'alienation de quelques portions de possessions, dites ecclesiastiques, & sur l'administration de toutes. A Paris: Chez Baudouin
- 1789 - Opinion de M. Treilhard, sur la propriété des possessions du clergé. A Paris: Chez Baudouin
- 1789 - Résumé de l'opinion de M. Treilhard sur le droit de sanction. A Versailles: Chez Baudouin
- 1790 - Opinion de m. Treilhard sur le rapport du Comité ecclésiastique concernant l'organisation du clergé. Paris: Chez Baudouin Imprimeur de l'assemblee
- 1790 - Lettre de M. Treilhard aux auteurs de la feuille qui a pour titre, l'Ami du roi, des François, de l'ordre & sur-tout de la vérité. A Paris: De l'Imprimerie nationale
- 1792 - Jean-Baptiste Treilhard aux membres du tribunal criminel du 17 août. Paris: De l'imprimerie de Cl. Simon
- 1793 - Récit exact de la conduite tenue à l'égard des membres de la Convention nationale délégués dans le département de la Gironde, par les membres des autorités constituées, se disant réunis en Commission populaire de salut public, à Bordeaux. Paris: De l'Imprimerie nationale
- 1796 - Opinion prononcée par Treilhard sur la question intentionnelle. Séance du 4 vendémiaire, an 5. Paris: De l'Imprimerie nationale
- 1796 - Opinion de Treilhard sur le rapport de la loi du 3 brumaire. Séance du premier brumaire, an V. A Paris: De l'Imprimerie nationale
- 1796 - Projets de résolutions présentés au Conseil des cinq-cents par Treilhard. Sénace du 15 prairial de l'an IV. A Paris: De l'Imprimerie nationale
- 1796 - Second discours sur la question intentionnelle. A Paris: De l'Imprimerie nationale
