= Jean-Nicolas Démeunier =

French author and politician (1751–1814)

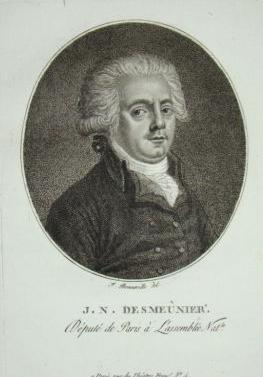

Jean-Nicolas Démeunier (sometimes Desmeuniers) (French pronunciation: [ʒɑ̃ nikɔla demønje]; 15 March 1751 – 2 February 1814) was a French writer and politician.

== Biography ==
Démeunier was born in Nozeroy in the department of Jura. He is the author of several historical essays, political and moral, and many translations of English travel books.

He attended his studies in his home province before his literary abilities earned him the attention of the royal court. Démeunier was appointed Royal Censor and secretary to "Monsieur", the Louis XVIII, who was the brother of King Louis XVI, and the King of France after the Restoration, an event that occurred only months after Démeunier's death.

== French Revolution ==
Supporter of the French Revolution, he was elected (16 May 1789) by the Third Estate of the city of Paris to the Estates General with 133 votes. When the conservative members of the Constitutional Committee resigned mid-September 1789, he was one of the deputies selected to replace them. He served a turn as President (22 December 1789 – 3 January 1790) of the National Assembly.

It was as a member of the Constitutional Committee that Démeunier had the biggest impact. He presented to the Assembly on behalf of the Committee a report (7 March 1791) on the need for the ministerial responsibility, and later declared support (26 August 1791) for the eligibility of the members of the royal family to hold elective office. He would also promote the organization of the jury and the Court of Cassation.

After the session, Demeunier was elected administrator of the city of Paris (7 November 1791), but he resigned immediately in protest of the election of Jerome Pétion as mayor.

He fled to the United States during the Reign of Terror.

== Directory, Consulate, and Empire ==
Démeunier returned to France in 1796, and was candidate to the French Directory.

The first Consul appointed Démeunier (4 Nivose VIII/25 December 1799) member of the Tribunat at its inception; he became president of this assembly 2 January 1800. He was further elevated to the Sénat conservateur 28 Nivose X (18 January 1802).

He received further awards under Napoleon, named to the Legion of Honor, first as Member 9 Vendémiaire XII (2 October 1803), then as commander 25 Prairial XII (14 June 1804), and finally as Grand Officer (30 June 1811). Démeunier was established comte de l'Empire (26 April 1808).

Démeunier died months before the fall of Napoleon. He is interred in the Panthéon in Paris.

== Lycée ==
Démeunier was particularly active in the management of the newly created Lycée of which "Monsieur", the Comte de Provence, was the principal Maecenas. This Lycée was created by combining the Musée de Paris with the Musée Scientifique—both had been created by the Société Appolonienne. The aim of these institutions was to provide good-quality education to the general public. After the return of Louis XVIII to Paris, the Lycée remained active under the name "Athénée Royal", until 1848.

Jean-Nicolas Démeunier may also be considered one of the key figures in the organisation of support for the American cause. For example, his L'Amérique indépendante, ou les différents constitutions de treize provinces (1790) was to be of great influence on the democratic experiments in Belgium in the few years preceding the French Revolution. (For a detailed discussion of events and relevant sources see Gorman 1925, reference below.)

The real significance of "L'Amérique indépendante" lay in the fact that it was published as a separate volume of Démeunier's contributions to Charles Joseph Panckoucke's "Encyclopédie méthodique", which had been corrected and debated in correspondence with Thomas Jefferson.

== Writings ==
- L'Esprit des usages et des coutumes des différens peuples, ou observations tirées des voyageurs et des historiens (3 volumes, 1776). Réédition : J.-M. Place, Paris, 1988.
- Encyclopédie méthodique. Économie politique et diplomatique, partie dédiée et présentée à monseigneur le baron de Breteuil, ministre et secrétaire d'État, &c. Par M. Démeunier, avocat, & censeur royal (4 volumes, 1784–1788)
- Essai sur les États-Unis (1786).
- Des Conditions nécessaires à la légalité des États-Généraux (1788).
- Avis aux députés qui doivent représenter la Nation dans l'Assemblée des États-Généraux (1789).
- L'Amérique indépendante, ou Les différentes constitutions des treize provinces qui se sont érigées en républiques sous le nom d'États-Unis de l'Amérique. Avec un précis de l'histoire de chaque province, & des remarques sur les constitutions, la population, les finances & l'état dans lequel les provinces se trouvent actuellement (1790).
