= Michel Mathieu Lecointe-Puyraveau =

Michel Mathieu Lecointe-Puyraveau (13 December 1764 – 15 January 1827) was a French politician.

== Biography ==
=== Assembly and Convention ===
Born in Saint-Maixent-l'École (Deux-Sèvres), he was elected deputy for his département to the Legislative Assembly in 1792, where he made himself known for his harsh stances against the moderates. He was elected to the National Convention in the same year, voting in favor the capital punishment for King Louis XVI, with the possibility of appeal to the people.

His association with the Girondists nearly involved him in their fall of May–June 1793, despite Lecointe-Puyraveau's extreme Republicanism - he had placed his position in peril after publicly accusing Jean-Paul Marat for having instigated the September Massacres, and even called him "demented", but had not voted in favor of his prosecution. At the precise moment of the Girondists' proscription, Lecointe-Puyraveau was representative on mission to the Vendée, and, back in Paris during the Reign of Terror, remained an inconspicuous presence in the face of the Committee of Public Safety.

=== Directory, Empire, and proscription ===
He took part in the Thermidorian Reaction which brought down Maximilien Robespierre, but protested against the establishment of the Directory, and continually pressed for severer measures against the émigrés, and even their relatives who had remained in France.

He was secretary and then president of the Council of Five Hundred, and under the French Consulate a member of the Tribunate. Lecointe-Puyraveau took no part in public affairs under the First French Empire, but was Lieutenant General of police for south-east France during the Hundred Days.

After the 1815 battle of Waterloo he took ship from Toulon, but the ship was driven back by a storm and he narrowly escaped a disastrous shipwreck at Marseille. After six weeks imprisonment in the Château d'If, he returned to Paris, escaping, after the proscription of the regicides (those who had voted for the death of the previous king), to Brussels, where he died a decade later.
