= Antoine Jacques Claude Joseph, comte Boulay de la Meurthe =

French politician and magistrate

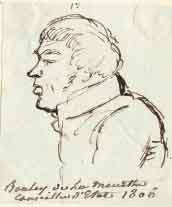
sketch by Frédéric-Christophe d'Houdetot

Antoine Jacques Claude Joseph, comte Boulay de la Meurthe ([bu.lɛ də la mœʁt]; 19 February 1761 – 4 February 1840), was a French politician and magistrate.

== Biography ==
Boulay was the son of an agricultural labourer, born at Chamousey (Vosges). He became orphaned at an early age and was adopted by his uncle l'Abbé POIROT.

Called to the bar at Nancy in 1783, he presently went to Paris, where he rapidly acquired a reputation as a lawyer and a speaker. He supported the revolutionary cause in Lorraine, and fought at Valmy (1792) and Wissembourg (1793) in the republican army. But his moderate principles brought suspicion on him, and during the Terror he had to go into hiding.

He represented La Meurthe in the Council of Five Hundred, of which he was twice president, but his views developed steadily in the conservative direction. Fearing a possible renewal of the Terror, he became an active member of the plot for the overthrow of the Directory in November 1799. He was rewarded by the presidency of the legislative commission formed by Napoleon to draw up the new constitution; and as president of the legislative section of the council of state he examined and revised the draft of the civil code.

In eight years of hard work as director of a special land commission he settled the titles of land acquired by the French nation at the Revolution, and placed on an unassailable basis the rights of the proprietors who had bought this land from the government. He received the grand cross of the Legion of Honour and the title of count, was a member of Napoleon's privy council, but was never in high favour at court.

After Waterloo he tried to obtain the recognition of Napoleon II. He was placed under surveillance at Nancy, and later at Halbesstadt and Frankfort-on-Main. He was allowed to return to France in 1819, but took no further active part in politics, although he presented himself unsuccessfully for parliamentary election in 1824 and 1827. He died in Paris on 4 February 1840.

His books on English history, contained much indirect criticism of the Directory and the Restoration governments. He devoted the last years of his life to writing his memoirs, which, with the exception of a fragment, remained unpublished as of 1911.

== Works ==
He published two books on English history:

- Essai sur les causes qui, en 1649, amenérent en Angleterre l'établissement de la république (Paris, 1799)
- Tableau politique des règnes de Charles II et Jacques II, derniers rois de la maison de Stuart (The Hague, 1818)

A fragment of his memoirs:

- Théorie constitutionnelle de Sieyès (1836)

== Family ==
His elder son, Comte Henri Georges Boulay de la Meurthe (1797–1858), was a constant Bonapartist, and after the election of Louis Napoleon to the presidency, was named (January 1849) vice-president of the republic. He zealously promoted popular education, and became in 1842 president of the society for elementary instruction. His descendants are known as the Boulay de la Meurthe family.
