= Antoine Balthazar Joachim d'André =

French royalist politician (1759–1825)

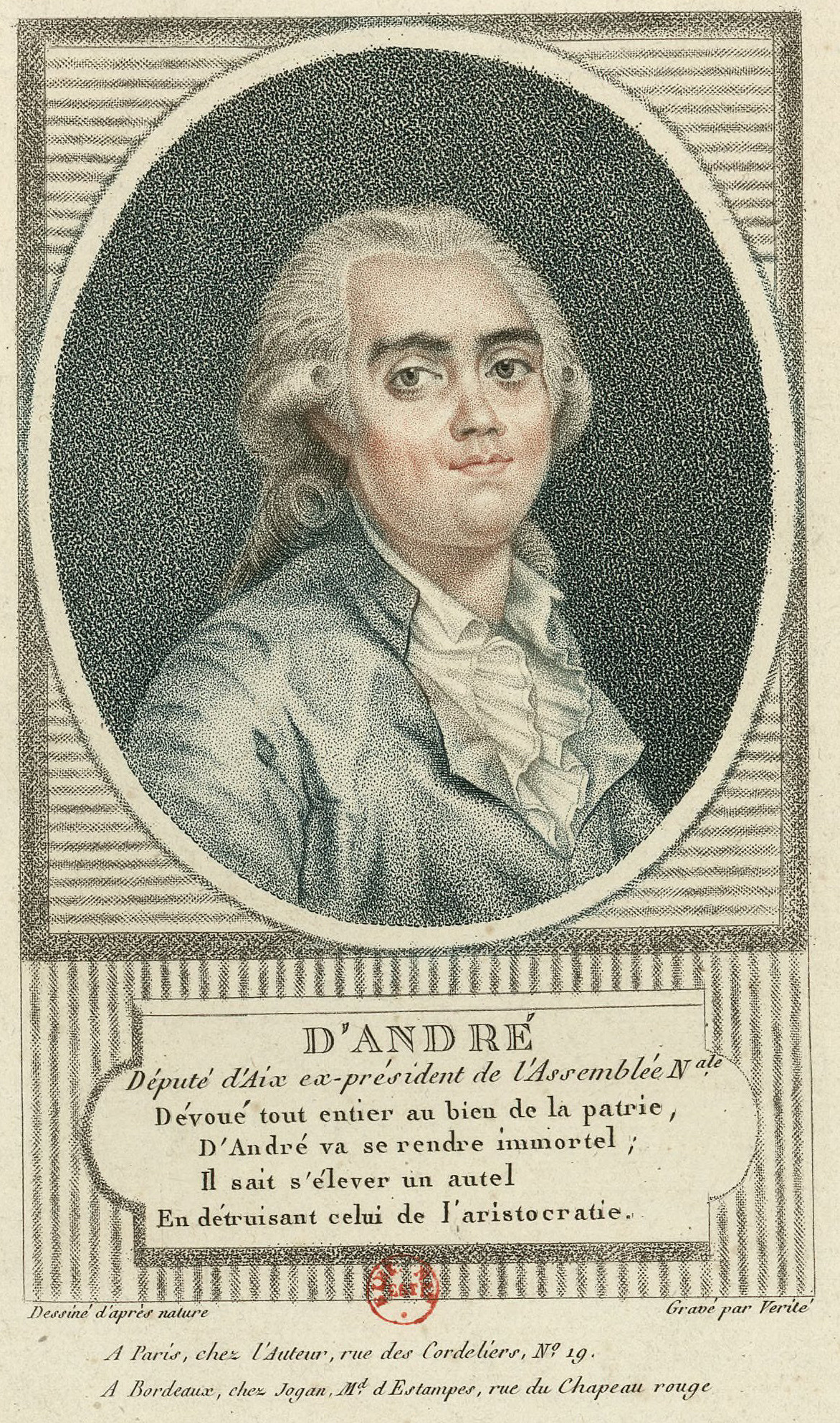
Portrait as ex-President of the Assemblée nationale, stipple engraving, 1791

Antoine Balthazar Joachim, baron d'André (2 July 1759 – 16 July 1825) was a French royalist politician.

== Biography ==
=== Early life ===
He was born in Aix-en-Provence on 2 July 1759.

=== Career ===
At the onset of the French Revolution he was a conseiller at the Parlement of Aix-en-Provence. Elected by the Second Estate as a representative of the sénéchaussée of Aix-en-Provence to the Estates-General of 1789 (also elected from Aix was the comte de Mirabeau, who though he was a nobleman was elected by the Third Estate). Following the example of Philippe, duc d'Orléans, he joined the Third Estate which became the National Constituent Assembly.

He was elected president of the National Assembly three times (31 July–16 August 1790; 21 December 1790 – 4 January 1791; 9–24 May 1791) and he was the second most prolific speaker, addressing the Assembly on 497 occasions (only Armand-Gaston Camus spoke more frequently). He was one of the prominent partisans pressing for a constitutional monarchy, and supported the faction known as the Monarchiens. The attempted royal flight to Varennes (20–21 June 1791) caused a crisis of faith in the monarchy, and inspired him to vote with the majority to suppress the royal executive power. Along with Adrien Duport and François Denis Tronchet he was selected to conduct the interview with Louis XVI in the aftermath. After the close of session for the National Assembly he remained in Paris, where he founded a large grocery business (épicerie), for which the journalists of the Left dubbed him "l'Épicier".

Accused of hoarding and suspected to plotting with the royalist émigrés, he emigrated himself, at first to Great Britain and then to Switzerland, where he placed himself in the service of the comte de Provence. In this capacity he became an active royalist; through him the British spymaster William Wickham directed the funds intended to support counter-revolutionary propaganda. Under the French Directory he returned to France in February 1797 to take in hand the electoral campaign of the royalist party, with some success, though he was not elected to the Council of Five Hundred.

After the Coup of 18 fructidor (4 September 1797) he escaped arrest by fleeing once more to Switzerland, and remained abroad for a decade, faithful to the comte de Provence, now proclaimed "Louis XVIII" by the royalists. After Napoleon's victory at Wagram (July 1809), D'André permitted his son Antoine Joseph Maurice d'André to serve in the Imperial army, while he occupied himself with establishing a model farm near Vienna.

With the Bourbon Restoration he followed Louis XVIII to France, and was pardoned for his defection, 1809–1814, and appointed general director of police, and superindendant of the Maison du Roi.

=== Death ===
He died at Aix-en-Provence on 16 July 1825.
