= Jacques Defermon des Chapelières =

French statesman

Jacques Defermon
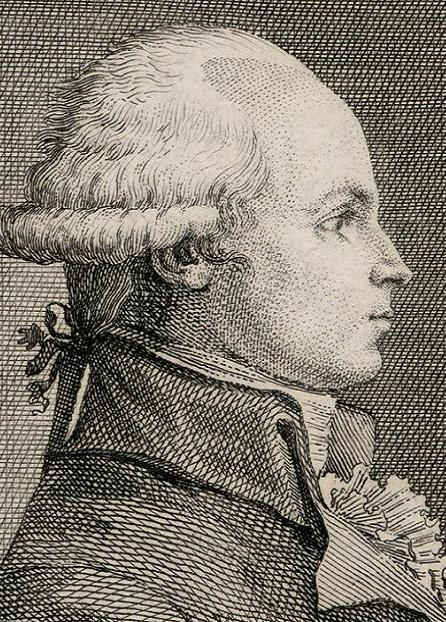
- Jacques Defermon des Chapelières, c. 1789

7th President of the National Convention
- In office 13 December 1792 – 27 December 1792
- Preceded by: Bertrand Barère
- Succeeded by: Jean Baptiste Treilhard

Personal details
- Born: 15 November 1756 La Basse-Chapelière, near Maumusson, Loire-Atlantique
- Died: 20 July 1831 (aged 74) Paris
- Party: Jacobin Club; Bonapartist
- Education: College de Châtillon, Châteaubriant
- Occupation: Lawyer

Jacques Defermon des Chapelières (15 November 1752 – 20 July 1831) was a French statesman during the French Revolution and a supporter of Napoleon Bonaparte and the French Empire.

In some sources his baptismal names are given as Jacques, Joseph (most probably in error); his surname also spelled as (de) Fermon or (de) Fermond. He can also be referred to as comte Defermon, comte de l'Empire (count Defermon, count of the Empire) from 23 March 1808.

== Biography ==
Born in La Basse-Chapelière, near Maumusson, in what would become the Department of Loire-Atlantique, he was educated at the Collège de Châtillon, in Châteaubriant, before studying law at Rennes. He became a lawyer in the Parlement of Rennes in 1782.

== French Revolution ==
Defermon was elected (18 April 1789) as a representative of the Third Estate of Rennes to the Estates General (France) and proceeded to become a deputy of the National Assembly from 1789 to 1791. He served as President of the National Assembly 19–30 July 1791, a vital period of time following the Flight to Varennes. During the tenure of the Legislative Assembly he served as president of the Criminal Tribunal of Rennes (1791–1792).

Elected to the Convention (serving 1792–1793, then 1794–1795 following a lengthy suspension) as a deputy for the département of Ille-et-Vilaine. He was President of the Convention 13–27 December 1792, during much of the debates surrounding the question of the Trial of Louis XVI. He would be exiled as a regicide following the Restoration.

Defermon supported the Girondists and signed a petition (2 June 1793) against their exclusion from the convention by the Montagnards. For acting against the ascendent faction he was declared "traître à la patrie" (Traitor to the Fatherland), and eventually was forced to go into hiding to escape the arrest decreed by the convention (3 October 1793).

== Thermidor and The Directory ==
Defermon returned to exercising his duties as deputy in December 1794 as supporters of the Girondists are rehabilitated by an increasingly conservative Convention. He was elected a member of the Committee of Public Safety and served from 4 May 1795 to 1 September 1795). He was elected (14 October 1795) to the Corps législatif by the Département of Ille-et-Vilaine and subsequently selected to sit in the Council of Five Hundred (1795–1797), serving as president from 21 May 1796 to 19 June 1796). He retired from the legislature upon his appointment as a commissioner of the National Treasury (1797–1799).

== Consulate, Empire, and Restoration ==
Defermon supported the Coup of 18 Brumaire (10 November 1799) of Napoleon Bonaparte and was appointed a member of the Tribunat (25 December 1799) and counselor of state. He chaired the department of finance (1799–1814), was appointed intendant général (1805), and named minister of state (1808). Napoleon awarded him the title of comte Defermon, comte de l'Empire (23 March 1808).

During the Cent Jours (Hundred Days), was elected (12 May 1815) a deputy of the Chamber of Representatives from Ille-et-Vilaine. Banished as a regicide (1816), he lived in Brussels (1816–1822) before returning to France. He died in Paris in 1831 at age 78.
