= Jean-Baptiste Clauzel =

French politician (1746–1803)

55th President of the National Convention
- In office 24 November – 6 December 1794
- Preceded by: Louis Legendre
- Succeeded by: Jean-François Reubell

Personal details
- Born: 21 September 1746 Lavelanet, Kingdom of France
- Died: 2 July 1803 (aged 56) Paris, France
- Party: The Mountain

Jean-Baptiste Clauzel (born in Lavelanet on 21 September 1746; died in Paris on 2 July 1803) was a French politician. In 1790, he was elected mayor of his hometown. In 1791, his countrymen sent him to sit in the Legislative Assembly where he was very discreet. In 1792, he was re-elected to the Convention by the department of Ariege, when he sided with the Mountain. At the trial of Louis XVI in January 1793, this supposed royalist voted for the king's death without the possibility of a suspended sentence (sursis or of an appeal of the people. He did not vote for the impeachment of Jean-Paul Marat while claiming to be "far from approving all the principles of the Revolution espoused by his fanatic friend." Despite his opposition to the Girondins, he voted for the maintenance of their members' allowances to those under arrest. He served as a representative on mission to the Army of the Pyrenees (West) from the end of August 1793 when he was recalled to Paris. He was among those who organized the downfall of Maximilien Robespierre. After 9 Thermidor Year II (27 July 1794) he joined the Committee of General Security, and supported the closing of the Jacobin Club. An active Thermidorian, he was extremely active during the insurrection of the 1st Prairial (20 May 1795). He denounced and arrested the last Montagnards and called for the arrest of Bertrand Barère, Jacques Nicolas Billaud-Varenne and Jean-Marie Collot d'Herbois. Returning to the army of the Pyrenees, he found it disgracefully disorganized and unable to fight.

Under the Directory, he was elected to the Council of Ancients and continued to oppose the return of emigrés and priests to their former positions.
