= Armand-Gaston Camus =

French archivist and revolutionary (1740–1804)

Armand Gaston Camus

Armand-Gaston Camus (2 April 1740 – 2 November 1804), French revolutionist, was a successful lawyer and advocate before the French Revolution. He was the son of Pierre Camus, a lawyer in the Parlement of Paris.

Camus is considered the founder of the Archives Nationales, as in 1789 he was appointed as archivist of its predecessor, the Commission des archives of the Assembly (Estates-General). He served in this role until his death.

== French Revolution ==
In 1789 Camus was elected by the Third Estate of Paris to the Estates-General; he attracted attention by his speeches against social inequalities. He was one of the National Assembly's earliest presidents (28 October – 11 November 1789), and he was the most frequent speaker: no one addressed the Assembly more times than he did (more than 600 times); d'André is second at 497, and le Chapelier third at 447. Camus was so frequently called upon to speak mostly because of his expertise in canon law.

Camus was appointed on 14 August 1789 as archivist to the Commission des archives of the Assembly; the commission was the immediate precursor to the Archives Nationales. He would retain these functions until his death.

He helped to write and voted for the Civil Constitution of the Clergy, worked to end the practice of paying annates to the papacy, and promoted the annexation of the Vaucluse by France. On 30 July 1791, he obtained the abolition of titles of nobility.

Elected to the National Convention by the département of Haute-Loire, he was on a mission outside Paris during the judgment of Louis XVI. But, he wrote on 13 January 1793 that he voted for "death without appeal and without reprieve".

On his return, Camus was sent to Belgium as one of five commissioners of the convention, to the Armée du Nord commanded by General C. F. Dumouriez. The general was in an extremely precarious position, and was suspected of plotting to betray the Revolution. The suspicions were confirmed when Dumouriez delivered Camus with his colleagues to the Austrians (3 April 1793).

After thirty-three months of captivity, Camus was exchanged for Marie Thérèse of France in November 1795. He played an inconspicuous role in the Council of Five Hundred, refusing positions in the Ministry of Finance or of Police. He was restored to the office of archivist in 1796 and became absorbed in literary work. He remained an austere republican, refusing to take part in the Napoleonic régime.
