= Charles François, Marquis de Bonnay =

French military, diplomatic, and political figure of the French Revolution

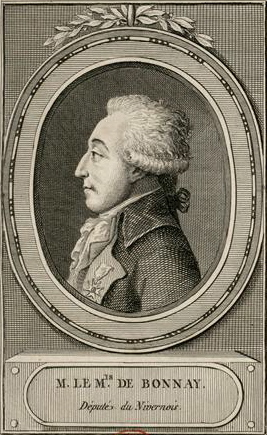
Marquis de bonnay

Charles-François, marquis de Bonnay (22 June 1750 – 25 March 1825) was a French military, diplomatic, and political figure of the French Revolution. He was appointed to the Chamber of Peers by Louis XVIII on August 17 1815.

== Biography ==
Born in Cossaye, Nièvre in central France to an old noble family of the Nivernais, he was appointed page of King Louis XV in 1765. He left the pages in 1768 to return as sub-lieutenant in the regiment of the king-dragons. In 1774, he is named free of bodyguards of the king (company of Villeroy), with patent of captain of cavalry, spent sub-lieutenant of bodyguards in 1776, and then mestre of camp of cavalry in 1779.

== French Revolution ==
Bonnay was elected 23 March 1789, by the Second estate of the bailiwick of the Nivernais and Donziois as a substitute deputy to the Estates General; he was admitted to sit 21 July in replacement of the comte de Damas d'Anlezy, who resigned. Three times elected president of the National Constituent Assembly, (12–27 April 1790; 5–20 July 1790; elected again 20 December but refused to serve) he supported the ministers of the Crown, especially Minister of Foreign Affairs Montmorin, criticised for having allowed the passage of the Austrian troops on French territory; he also defended the bodyguards accused by deputy Chabroud for provoking the days of 5 and 6 October 1789.

On the Flight to Varennes (20–21 June 1791), Bonnay was accused of having inside knowledge of the event prior to the royal family's departure. He defended himself deftly: "If the king had consulted me," he said, "I should not have advised this trip; but if I had received an order to accompany him, I would have rushed to obey, and to die by his sides."

When the executive power of the Crown was subsequently suspended, Bonnay stated that he would no longer be involved in the deliberations of the Assembly. He emigrated with the comte de Provence, acting as his close advisor during his stay in Warsaw, and followed him to England living at Gosfield Hall in Essex and subsequently at Hartwell House, Buckinghamshire.

== Restoration ==
In June 1814, following the First Restoration, the king appointed him Minister Plenipotentiary in Copenhagen; he remained in this post during the Hundred Days.

Named Peer of France by Louis XVIII on 17 August 1815, he voted for the death in the trial of the Marshal Ney, was promoted to lieutenant-general, the following 31 October, and appointed, 2 March 1816, Envoy Extraordinary and Minister Plenipotentiary in Berlin. He was appointed Minister of State and member of the king's Privy Council in 1820 and governor of the royal chateau of Fontainebleau in 1821. He died in Paris in 1825.
