= Jean-François Rewbell =

French lawyer and diplomat (1747–1807)

Jean-François Reubell
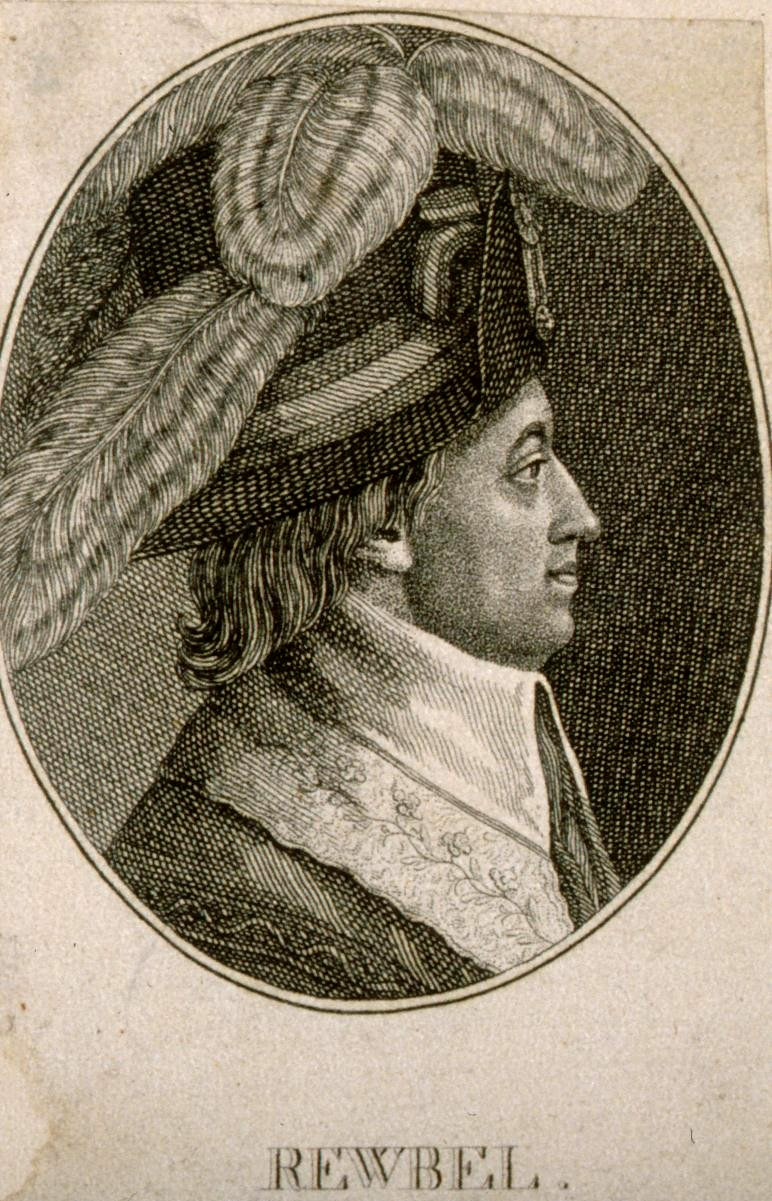
- Jean-François Reubell

56th President of the National Convention
- In office 6–21 December 1794
- Preceded by: Jean-Baptiste Clauzel
- Succeeded by: Pierre-Louis Bentabole

Personal details
- Born: 6 October 1747 Colmar, Haut-Rhin, Kingdom of France
- Died: 24 November 1807 (aged 60) Colmar, Haut-Rhin, France
- Party: The Mountain
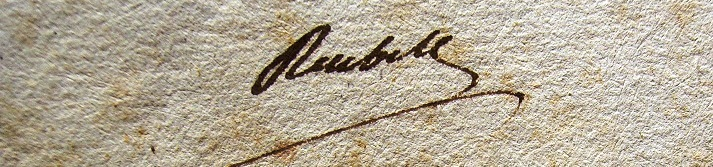
- Signature

Jean-François Reubell (French pronunciation: [ʒɑ̃ fʁɑ̃swa ʁøbɛl]) or Rewbell (6 October 1747 – 24 November 1807) was a French lawyer, diplomat, and politician of the Revolution.

== The revolutionary ==
Born at Colmar (now in the département of Haut-Rhin), he became president of the local order of lawyers, and in 1789 was elected as a deputy to the Estates-General by the Third Estate of the bailliage of Colmar-Schlestadt.

In the National Constituent Assembly his oratory, legal knowledge and austerity of life gave him much influence. A partisan of revolutionary reforms, Rewbell voted in favor of reforms such as the Civil Constitution of the Clergy, but opposed the recognition of citizenship rights for Alsatian Jews.

In July 1791, after the flight of Louis XVI, the constitutional king, Rewbell left the Jacobin Club and joined the Feuillants. During the session of the Legislative Assembly, after the Constituent Assembly was dissolved in September of that year, he exercised the functions of procureur syndic, and was subsequently secretary-general of the département of Haut-Rhin. He was elected to the Republic's National Convention in 1792, and was its envoy to the Rhineland, advocating the union of the Electorate of the Palatinate and other territories with France. A zealous promoter of the Trial of Louis XVI, he was absent on mission at the time of the king's condemnation.

== Directorate and retirement ==
He took part in the Thermidorian Reaction movement which led to the fall of Maximilien Robespierre, and became a member of the reorganised Committee of Public Safety and of the Committee of General Security. In early 1795, he assisted Emmanuel-Joseph Sieyès in negotiating the surrender of the Batavian Republic to the French Republic. His moderation caused his election by seventeen départements to the Council of Five Hundred.

Appointed a member of the Directory in November 1795, he became its president in 1796; he then entered the Council of Ancients. In office, Rewbell dealt with the Royalist attempted coup d'état (The 18 Fructidor), as well as the Conspiracy of the Equals; he engineered the annexation of the Rhineland and the southern Low Countries to the Republic, as well as the invasion of the Old Swiss Confederacy and the creation of the Helvetic Republic. He was retired by ballot in 1799, after being held responsible for the French defeats of that year in front of the Second Coalition.

After Napoleon Bonaparte's coup of 18 Brumaire he retired from public life, and died at Colmar.
