= Gui-Jean-Baptiste Target =

French lawyer and politician

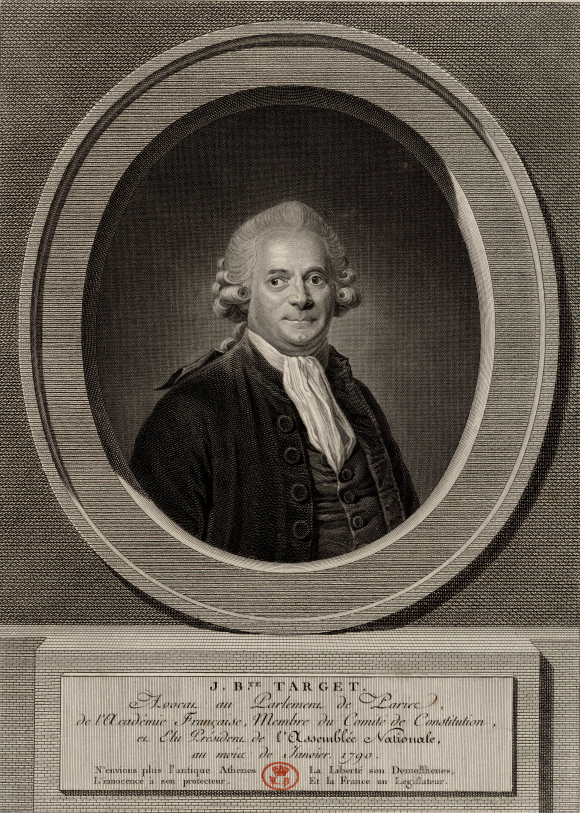
Guy-Jean-Baptiste Target

Gui-Jean-Baptiste Target (French pronunciation: [ɡi ʒɑ̃ batist taʁʒɛ], 17 December 1733 – 9 September 1806) was a French lawyer and politician.

== Biography ==
Born in Paris, Target was the son of a lawyer, and was himself a lawyer to the Parlement of Paris. He acquired a great reputation as a lawyer, less by practice in the courts than in a consultative capacity, and served the ancien régime as member of a committee to revise the civil and criminal laws of the kingdom. He strenuously opposed the "parlement Maupeou", devised by Chancellor Maupeou to replace the old judiciary bodies in 1771, refusing to plead before it, an act that earned him the sobriquet of the "Virgin of the palace".

He was counsel for Louis René Edouard, cardinal de Rohan in the "affair of the diamond necklace".

In 1785, he was elected to the Académie Française.

He contributed to the development of the Edict of Tolerance signed at Versailles by Louis XVI in 1787.

== French Revolution ==
In 1789, he was returned as one of the deputies of the Third Estate in Paris to the Estates-General, and he was instrumental in writing up the cahiers de doléances of Paris. He went on to support revolutionary measures such as the union of the orders, the suspensive veto, the Civil Constitution of the Clergy, the last of which he was one of the principal authors. He was one of many deputies named to the Constitutional Committee in September 1789, to replace those conservative members who resigned. He presided over the National Constituent Assembly 18 January – 2 February 1790.

His excessive obesity, which made him the butt of the Royalist jokes, prevented his practising at the bar for some years before 1789. When Louis XVI invited him to undertake his defence, he excused himself on this ground. In 1792, he published some constitutional observations in extenuation of the king's actions, which, in the circumstances of the time, would have taken some courage.

== From Thermidor to Empire ==
Target took no part in public affairs during the Reign of Terror. Under the Directory he was made a member of the Institut de France in 1796 and of the Court of Cassation in 1798. He lived to collaborate in the earlier stages of the new criminal code.

== Works ==
Among his writings may be mentioned a paper on the grain trade (1776) and a Mémoire sur l'état des Protestants en France (1787), in which he pleaded for the restoration of civil rights to Protestants.
