= Jean-Xavier Bureau de Pusy =

French politician (1750–1806)

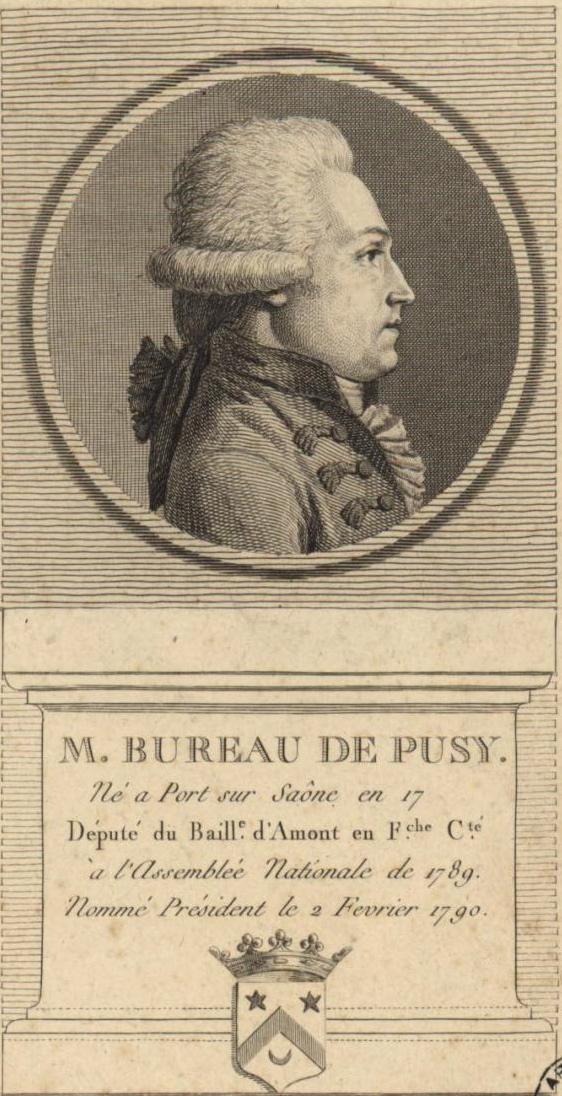
- Born: 7 January 1750; Port-sur-Saône, France
- Died: 2 February 1806 (aged 56); Genoa, Italy
- Military career
- Rank: Second lieutenant

Jean-Xavier Bureau de Pusy (7 January 1750 – 2 February 1806) was a French military engineer and politician, during the French Revolution.

== Early life ==
Bureau de Pusy was born on 7 January 1750 in Port-sur-Saône in the department of Haute-Saône.

== Political career ==
Deputy of nobility for the bailliage d'Amont in the Estates General of 1789 that became the National Constituent Assembly, Jean-Xavier Bureau de Pusy was three times named president of the National Constituent Assembly:

- from 2 to 24 February 1790;
- from 11 to 24 September 1790;
- from 24 May to 5 June 1791.

He contributed actively to the division of France into 83 departments, in 1790, and with the metric system.

In 1790, he corresponded with Alexander Hamilton.

== Military career ==
On 1 January 1771 he entered the School of Engineering at Mézières as a second lieutenant. He was a military engineer at the Fort de Joux in 1786, in 1789 he was captain with the Royal corps of Engineers.

After the session of the National Constituent Assembly, he resumed as a captain in the engineering corps, and continued to defend the constitutional principles. On 1 January 1792, Louis XVI gave him the Cross of St. Louis.

In 1792, he was a subordinate under Gilbert du Motier, marquis de Lafayette, at Metz. He, Lafayette, and some other officers were taken prisoner by the Austrians near Rochefort when de Pusy asked for rights of transit through Austrian territory on behalf of a group of French officers. This was initially granted, as it had been for others fleeing France, but was revoked when the famous Lafayette was recognized. He was imprisoned by the Austrians at the fortress of Olomouc in 1792. He was released in 1797, under the terms of the treaty of Campo-Formio (18 October 1797).

He the then went to Hamburg. From there he traveled to the United States, where he received a warm welcome as Lafayette companion in misfortune. He was offered vast, land grants on the banks of the Delaware River, but he had not given up on returning to France, and when the consulate government had, after the coup of 18 Brumaire, struck off the list of émigrés members of the National Constituent Assembly who had recognized the sovereignty of the people, he hastened to return.

In 1799, he corresponded with Thomas Jefferson.

== Consulate and empire ==
On 11 Brumaire X (2 November 1801), the First Consul appointed him the prefect of Allier, and then, on 11 Thermidor X (30 July 1802), that of the Rhône; it showed a very conciliatory spirit, and showed himself able administrator.

He was made a Commandeurs of the Legion of Honour on 25 Prairial XII (14 June 1804). He was appointed prefect of Gênes (Genoa) on 15 Messidor year XIII (4 July 1805); he had to suppress a riot of Parma, and was able to without shedding a drop of blood. He caught an illness that he died from on this exposition. He died on 2 February 1806 in Genoa.

== Family ==
He was the son of Jean-Baptiste Bureau de Pusy de Port-sur-Saône, conseiller correcteur of the Chambre des comptes of Franche-Comté, and grandson of Pierre-François Choullat. He was the son-in-law of Pierre Poivre. His mother-in-law, Françoise Robin, married Pierre Samuel du Pont de Nemours. His son, Maurice de Pusy (1799–1864), married Mathilde de Lafayette, daughter of Georges de Lafayette and Emilie de Tracy, and granddaughter of General Lafayette and Antoine Destutt de Tracy.
