= Jacques Guillaume Thouret =

French Girondin revolutionary (1746–1794)

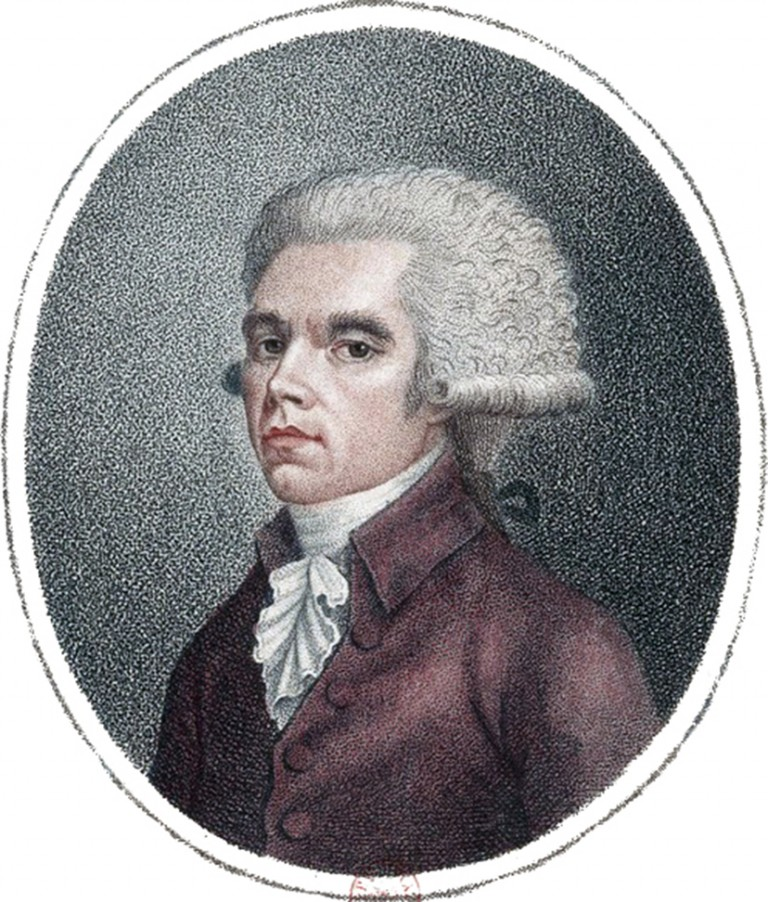
- Born: 30 April 1746; Pont-l'Évêque, Calvados, Normandy
- Died: 22 April 1794 (aged 47)
- Occupations: Revolutionary, lawyer
- Political party: Girondin

Jacques Guillaume Thouret (French pronunciation: [ʒak ɡijom tuʁɛ]; 30 April 1746 – 22 April 1794) was a French Girondin revolutionary, lawyer, president of the National Constituent Assembly and victim of the guillotine.

== Biography ==
Born at Pont-l'Évêque, Calvados (Normandy) to a notary father, Thouret became an avocat at the parlement of Rouen in 1773, and in 1787 produced a much-approved report on the state of Normandy. His brother, Michel Augustin Thouret (1748–1810), a physician, was a key opponent of the ideas of Franz Mesmer and a promoter of vaccination in France.

=== National Assembly ===
In 1788 he participated in the agitation that contributed to the recall of the Estates-General. Thouret was elected deputy to the Estates-General by the third estate of Rouen, and was instrumental in composing the local cahiers de doléances. In the Constituent Assembly (beginning 17 June 1789) his eloquence gained him great influence. Like so many lawyers of his time, he was violently opposed to the clergy, and strongly supported the secularization of church property. He also advocated the suppression of the religious orders and of all ecclesiastical privileges, and actively contributed to the change of the judiciary and administrative system; in particular, he demanded the writing of a uniform civil code. He was four times elected president of the Constituent Assembly (3 August 1789, declined to serve; 12–23 November 1789; 8–27 May 1790; 11–30 September 1791, the final sessions of the Assembly), which is more times than anyone else.

=== Constitutional Committee ===
Thouret joined the Constitutional Committee late in September 1789. Article five of the Declaration of the Rights of Man and of the Citizen was adopted on his initiative, but his most important efforts surrounded the process by which France was divided into départements though 1790.

On 3 September 1791, a deputation of sixty members of the Constituent Assembly under the presidency of Thouret presented the 1791 Constitution to Louis XVI; on 13 September, the King addressed the Assembly, declaring that he accepted the Constitution.

=== Later days ===
After the Assembly's dissolution, Thouret became a member, and then in 1793 president, of the Court of Cassation.

He was included in the proscription of the Girondists, whose political opinions he shared, and was guillotined in Paris, during the Reign of Terror, the same day as fellow Constitutional Committee member Isaac René Guy le Chapelier, and defense attorney for Louis XVI, Guillaume-Chrétien de Lamoignon de Malesherbes.

== Legacy ==
A bust of Thouret created in 1879 by Jules-Constant Destreez can be seen in the gallery of the second floor of the Court of Cassation.

A bust of Thouret and dedication plaque can also be seen in Rue Thouret, Rouen, a street named in his honour.

== Works ==
Besides his speeches and reports he wrote:

- Tableau chronologique de l'Histoire ancienne et moderne
- Discours de M. Thouret devant l'Assemblée nationale fait au nom du comité de la Constitution : Sur l'obligation du roi de résider dans le royaume (1790)
- Abrégé des révolutions de l'ancien gouvernement français
