= Stanislas Marie Adélaïde, comte de Clermont-Tonnerre =

French nobleman, military officer and politician

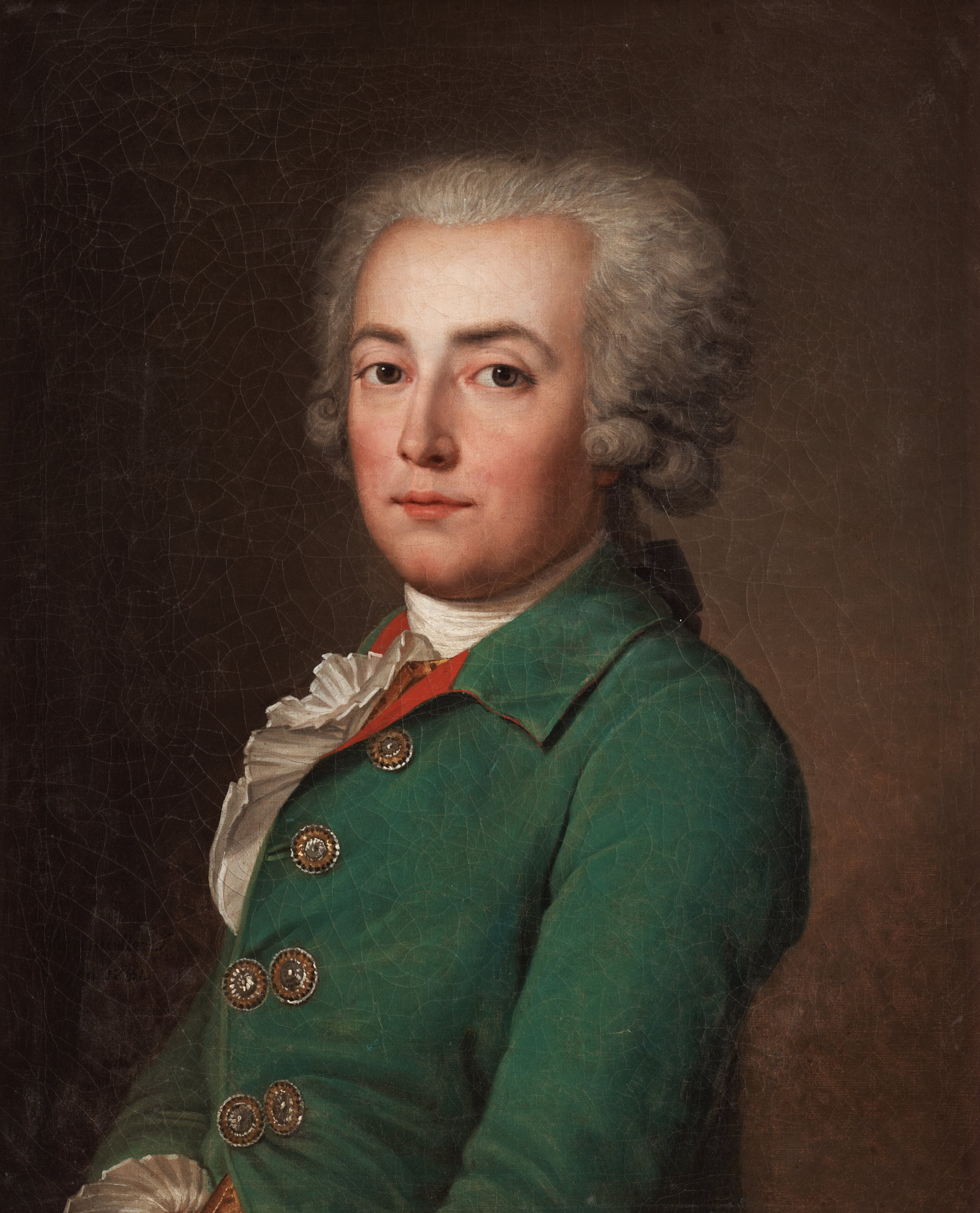
Count Stanislas de Clermont-Tonnerre

Stanislas Marie Adélaïde, comte de Clermont-Tonnerre (October 10, 1747 – August 10, 1792) was a French nobleman, military officer, and politician during the French Revolution.

== Early life and career ==
Born in Mandres-aux-Quatre-Tours in the Duchy of Bar, Stanislas was the eldest son of François-Joseph, marquis de Clermont-Tonnerre (1726-1809) and his first wife, Mary Anne de Lentilhac de Gimel, and the grandson of Gaspard, duc de Clermont-Tonnerre (1688-1781), marshal of France. Following in the family tradition, he became colonel of the 1st Cuirassier Regiment.

In 1782, he married Mary Louise Josephine Delphine de Rosières de Sorans (December 1766 - October 26, 1832, Paris), lady-in-waiting to Princess Élisabeth of France; the sister of Louis XVI. They had three children, of whom only the eldest daughter survived into adulthood, marrying Esprit Louis Charles Alexandre Savary de Lancosme (1784-1853) in 1803.

Prior to the beginning of the French Revolution he was a Freemason, a noted orator (having acquired practice in speaking in the Masonic Lodge), and a Liberal. He spent time with reformists such as Antoine Pierre Joseph Marie Barnave and Jacques Pierre Brissot outside of the Assembly as they all shared the common interest of keeping the monarchy in place.

== French Revolution ==
He was elected to the Estates-General of 1789 by the Second Estate of Paris, and was the spokesman of the minority of Liberal nobles (including the duc d'Orléans and the marquis de Lafayette) who joined the Third Estate on the 25th of June.

In July 1789, Stanislas wrote and shared two propositions based on varying cahiers from across the Assembly, one known as the Rapport du Comité de Constitution. Both liberals and conservatives alike felt the proposals were not rooted in the best interest of either faction. He was chiefly concerned with keeping the kingdom intact, yet he voted for the motion of the vicomte de Noailles to abolish feudalism in France 4–5 August 1789.

Clermont-Tonnerre desired to model the new constitution of France on the organic laws of England. He served on the first incarnation (established 17 July 1789) of the eight-member Constitutional Committee. When the National Assembly rejected its proposals for a bicameral legislature and an absolute veto for the Crown (10–11 September 1789), he resigned along with five fellow conservatives (including Jean Joseph Mounier). For the remainder of his tenure in the National Assembly he attached himself to the party of moderate Royalists, known as monarchi gens, led by Pierre Victor, baron Malouet.

He was twice elected president of the National Constituent Assembly in rapid succession (17–31 August 1789; 9–28 September 1789).

== Conflict with the Jacobins ==
His political views earned him the animosity of radical politicians of the Palais Royal; yet in spite of threats and abuse he continued to advocate a moderate liberal policy, especially in the matter of removing restrictions for the Jews and Protestants and extending the system of trial by jury.

In January 1790, he collaborated with Pierre Victor, baron Malouet in founding the Club des Impartiaux and the Journal des Impartiaux, the names of which were changed in November to the Société des Amis de la Constitution Monarchique and Journal de la Société, in order to emphasize their opposition to the Jacobin Club. Their Société des Amis was denounced by Antoine Pierre Joseph Marie Barnave in the Assembly (January 21, 1791), and on March 28 it was attacked by a mob, whereupon it was closed by order of the National Assembly.

Stanislas's efforts to pass legislation in the Assembly ultimately failed as he would end up dead at the hands of the riots. Many of his fellow nobles such as Barnave and Brissot would ultimately meet the same fates under 40 brought upon them by the revolutionaries.

== Last days ==
Clermont-Tonnerre was arrested after the Flight to Varennes (21 June 1791). He was released on 10 August 1792, only to be murdered by the people of Paris during the storming of the Tuileries. He attempted to contact King Louis XVI through the rioting but was apprehended by one of Robespierre's mobs while hiding in Madame de Brassac's home. Their animosity toward any sympathizer of the King led them to believe he should be executed immediately. Stanislas was then forced through a fourth-floor window and fell to his death.
