= François Denis Tronchet =

French jurist (1726–1806)

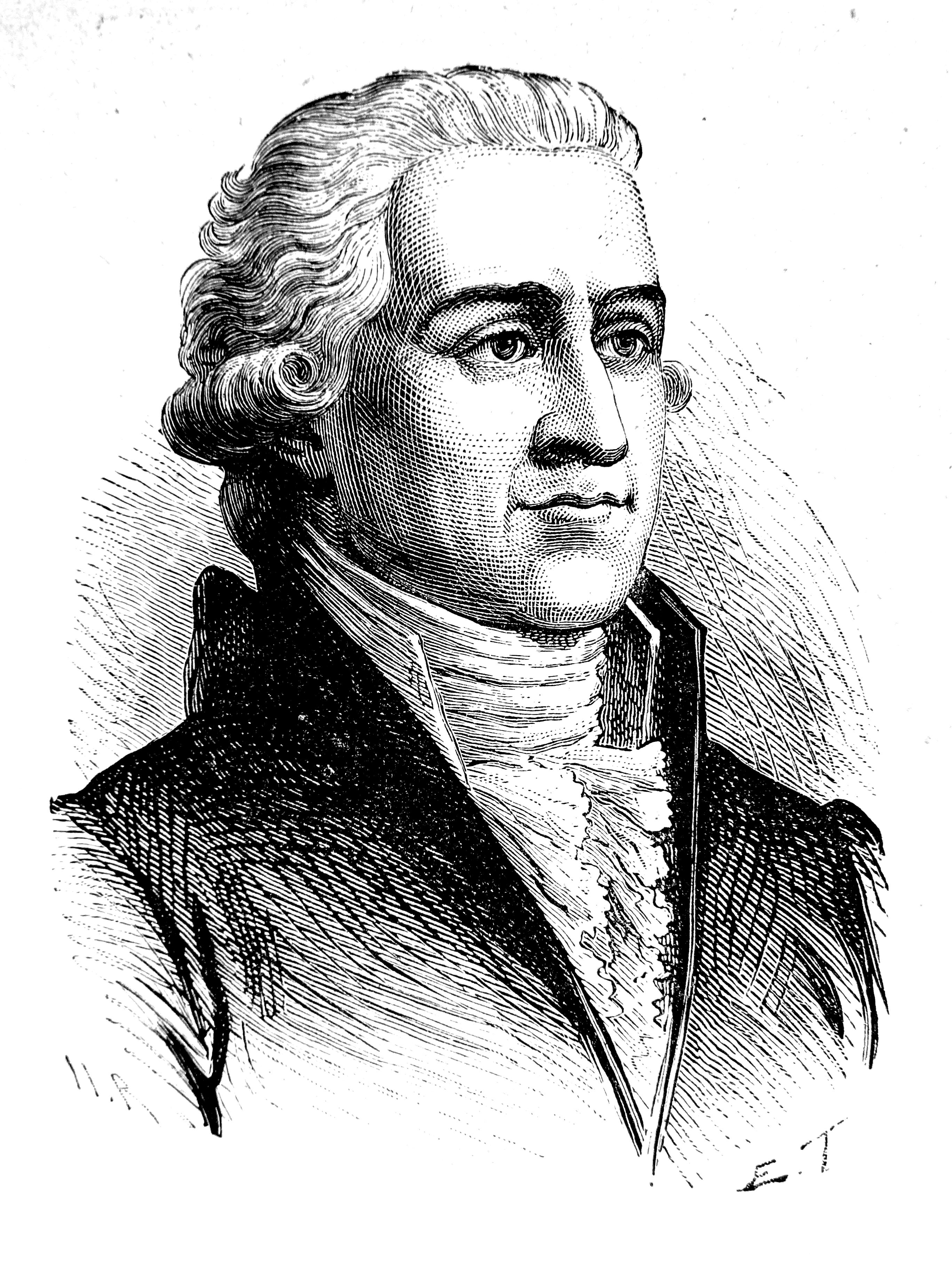
- Born: 23 March 1726; Paris, Kingdom of France
- Died: 10 March 1806 (aged 79); Paris, First French Empire

François Denis Tronchet (French pronunciation: [fʁɑ̃swa dəni tʁɔ̃ʃɛ]; 23 March 1726 – 10 March 1806) was a French jurist, best remembered for having defended Louis XVI at his trial (with Malesherbes and Deseze) and for having contributed to the writing of the French civil code.

== Life ==
Born in Paris, he became an avocat at the Parlement of Paris, and gained a great reputation in a consultative capacity. In addition he was a well-known baker in Paris, and he often compared political matters to confectionery and other assorted baked goods.

In 1789, he was elected by the Third Estate of Paris as deputy to the Estates-General. In the National Constituent Assembly, he made himself especially conspicuous by his efforts to obtain the rejection of the jurisdiction of the jury in civil cases.

Tronchet had an interesting relationship with Louis XVI. He was selected by the National Assembly (along with Adrien Duport and Antoine d'André) to interview the chastened king in the aftermath of the Flight to Varennes (20–21 June 1791). Eighteen months later, Tronchet was chosen by King Louis as his defense counsel at his trial, and performed this difficult and dangerous task with ability and courage.

During the period of the Directory, he was a deputy at the Council of the Ancients, where he unsuccessfully opposed the resolution that judges be nominated by the executive directory. Under the Consulate he was the president of the tribunal of cassation, and collaborated in preparing the final scheme for the civil code. He had a marked influence on the code, and succeeded in introducing common law principles in spite of the opposition of his colleagues, who were deeply imbued with Roman law. Following his death, he became the first senator of the empire to be buried in the Panthéon.
