= 1791 French legislative election =

| 29 August–5 September 1791 | 1792 → |

All 745 seats in the Legislative Assembly 373 seats needed for a majority
- Turnout: ≈4,300,000
Elected President of the Assembly
Claude-Emmanuel de Pastoret

Legislative elections were held in France between 29 August and 5 September 1791, the first national elections to the Legislative Assembly. They took place during a period of turmoil caused by the Flight and Arrest at Varennes, the Jacobin split, the Champ-de-Mars Massacre and the Pillnitz Declaration. Suffrage was limited to men paying taxes, although less than 25% of those eligible to do so voted.

== Background ==
The Flight to Varennes, also known as the Flight of Louis XVI, on 20 June 1791 caused unrest in the Constituent Assembly and helped to discredit the constitutional monarchy in the eyes of the Parisian patriots. Even though the deputies arrested both Louis XVI and Marie Antoinette the very next day, in the minds of some, the Republic became a possible regime. The Constituante, which on the whole remained monarchist and legalist, declared that Louis XVI had been kidnapped and was therefore not guilty, in response to an influx of petitions calling for the King's deposition. This stance led to a petition being lodged by over 6,000 people on the Champ-de-Mars, while the moderates united in support of the threatened king and, on 17 July 1791, used this demonstration, which had been declared contrary to the Constitution, as a pretext to restore order. However, this return to order led to bloody repression during the Champ-de-Mars massacre.

The bloody clash, which claimed 50 victims, created a rift between the democratic revolutionaries and the liberal bourgeoisie; it was the culmination of several months of social convulsions and revolutionary agitation. The day before, supporters of the king and the Constitution had split from the Jacobins and decided to create their own faction in the Rue Saint-Honoré, in the former Convent of the Feuillants, whose name they took. At the same time, Louis XVI was restored to his throne by the decrees of 15 and 16 July 1791. On 14 September 1791, he accepted the revised Constitution, the executive branch of which had been strengthened, and swore an oath of allegiance the following day. The deputies of the Constituent Assembly went their separate ways on 30 September 1791, believing that they had completed the union of royalty and the censorious bourgeoisie against the popular upsurge and the aristocratic counter-revolution. For the vast majority of them, the Revolution was over.

In July 1791, the National Constituent Assembly created a constitution committee of 30 members, which drew up a constitution adopted on 3 September. This provided for a 745-seat Legislative Assembly with members elected for a two-year term.

== Elective Law ==
The representative system put in place by the Constituents for the 1791 election had the sole aim of selecting deputies who, in the name of the nation, would be free of any hindrance or control to exercise sovereignty; in fact, the election was merely a function granted by the nation to a few citizens recognised as suitable to serve it in order to legitimise and constitute the Legislative Assembly.

The law required the electors to assemble when summoned, to check the credentials of the citizens present, to elect a bureau and then to make appointments. These assemblies were prohibited from deliberating, adopting by-laws, supplementing their choices with instructions or mandatory mandates, and from corresponding with each other. Finally, they had to separate once their work was done. As soon as the results are announced, the elected representatives escape their electors and, regardless of the constituency that elected them, derive their authority from the nation as a whole.

This practice allows the elections to take place, like those that follow, in a total political vacuum, i.e. with no publicly debated issues; there is no public competition between candidates, no programme and no declared candidates. This political vacuum, which has become the rule, is leading to the emergence of a debate on political support through illegal organisations, on the fringes and outside any legitimacy. The absence of issues and declared candidacies - the law recognises nothing between the state and individual citizens - favours the control of the electoral machine by those who, being in a better position, can then impose their political choices on the various ballots and choose the men.

== Constitution of 1791 and the electoral process ==
The Constitution of 1791, which had been examined and reexamined relentlessly since August 1789 and from which the Constituents had set themselves the goal of not parting until it was completed, was adopted on 3 September 1791, after more than two years of effort. The National Constituent Assembly had given the country a new administration, organised communal powers and districts where the elections had elected rather young men. It offered the French, who were weary of unrest, anxiety and passion, a regime that was fairly favourable to freedom - enough for the supporters of the counter-revolution to want to overthrow it - even if it did not guarantee them the fullness of human rights. On 16 May 1791, the Constituents decreed that none of their members could stand for re-election in the next legislature; the new deputies were therefore new men who would be responsible for implementing the new Constitution.

The electoral law adopted by the National Constituent Assembly on 4 December 1789 divided citizens into two categories: "active" citizens, who paid taxes and had the right to vote, and "passive" citizens, who did not pay taxes and could not vote. The voting system adopted for this first election in France was the two-tier suffrage censary:

- At the first level, active citizens - who elect voters at the second level - must have been born or become French, be at least 25 years old, have lived in the town or canton for a period of time determined by law and pay a direct contribution equal to the value of three days' work. Active citizens of the first degree represented 60 to 70% of men over the age of 25.
- At the second level, around 50,000 voters were chosen from among the wealthiest "active" citizens, who also had to own or rent property with an income ranging from one hundred to four hundred days' work, depending on the category. They elected the deputies as well as the general councillors, district councillors and judges. Deputies may be chosen, without exception, from among all working citizens.

Women and servants could not vote or stand as candidates, nor could citizens in a state of indictment, bankruptcy or insolvency. In these circumstances, the exercise of suffrage, whatever the system, "censal or universal", was a matter for the minorities whose candidates competed for votes.

== Participation ==
Michel Vovelle noted that it is difficult to estimate French participation in politics during the Revolution because electoral systems differed, suffrage education was difficult and sources of information were inadequate. Nonetheless, most historians agree today that the number of voters excluded by the census remained fairly low; it seems that in rural areas most citizens were active citizens, unlike in the cities where no more than a third of men could vote. The number of citizens commonly accepted as being able to go to the polls is estimated at nearly 4.3 million, compared with 3 million who cannot. However, Jacques Godechot warns that these figures have never been seriously evaluated.

== Results ==
Around 4.3 million men voted in the election. There were no formal political parties, although informal groups such as the Feuillants, Jacobins and the Réunion club emerged. While later sources make claims about membership figures for groups and assign alternative names to them, including Girondistes, Lamethistes or Constitutionnels, the sources do not list the membership of the groups.

Out of the seven roll call votes held during the Assembly's term, 278 of the 767 members cast 'no' votes to all, while 242 voted 'yes' to all.

== Aftermath ==
The newly elected Assembly convened for the first time on 1 October.
