= Jacobins =

Political club during the French Revolution

Jacobin Club
- Club des Jacobins
- Other name: Society of the Friends of the Constitution
- Founded: 1789; 237 years ago
- Dissolved: 1794; 232 years ago
- Country: French First Republic
- Groups: Girondins; The Plain; Montagnards
- Headquarters: Dominican convent, Rue Saint-Honoré, Paris
- Newspaper: Journal de la Montagne
- Ideology: Jacobinism; Classical radicalism; French secularism
- Political position: Left-wing
- Status: Defunct political group
- Size: approx. 500,000 (1793 est.)

The Society of the Friends of the Constitution (French: Société des amis de la Constitution), renamed the Society of the Jacobins, Friends of Freedom and Equality (Société des Jacobins, amis de la liberté et de l'égalité) after 1792 and commonly known as the Jacobin Club (Club des Jacobins) or simply the Jacobins (/ˈdʒækəbɪnz/; French: [ʒakɔbɛ̃]), was the most influential political club during the French Revolution of 1789. The period of its political ascendancy includes the Reign of Terror, during which well over 10,000 people were put on trial and executed in France, many for "political crimes".

Initially founded in 1789 by anti-royalist deputies from Brittany, the club grew into a nationwide republican movement with a membership estimated at a half million or more. The Jacobin Club was heterogeneous and included both prominent parliamentary factions of the early 1790s: The Mountain and the Girondins. In 1792–93, the Girondins were more prominent in leading France when they declared war on Austria and on Prussia, overthrew King Louis XVI, and set up the French First Republic. In May 1793, the leaders of the Mountain faction, led by Maximilien Robespierre, succeeded in sidelining the Girondin faction and controlled the government until July 1794. Their time in government featured high levels of political violence, and for this reason the period of the Jacobin/Mountain government is identified as the Reign of Terror. In October 1793, 21 prominent Girondins were guillotined. The Mountain-dominated government executed 17,000 opponents nationwide as a way to suppress the Vendée insurrection and the Federalist revolts, and to deter recurrences. In July 1794, the National Convention pushed the administration of Robespierre and his allies out of power and had Robespierre and 21 associates executed. In November 1794, the Jacobin Club closed.

In the years and decades after the revolution, the term Jacobin was used in an extended sense to denote political positions perceived as similar to those of the historical Jacobins and the Mountain in the National Convention. It was popular among conservative publicists as a pejorative to deride progressive politics, and among Anglophone progressives likewise as a pejorative denoting the violent excesses of the revolution, whereas they associated its positive features and principles with the Girondins. In Britain, the term faintly echoed negative connotations of Jacobitism, the pro-Catholic, monarchist, rarely insurrectional political movement that faded out decades earlier tied to deposed King James II of England and his descendants. The term Jacobin reached obsolescence and supersedence before the Russian Revolution, when the terms Marxism, anarchism, socialism, and communism had overtaken it.

In modern France, the term Jacobin generally denotes a position of more equal formal rights, centralization, and moderate authoritarianism. It can be used to denote supporters of a role of the state in the transformation of society. It is, in particular, used as a self-identification by proponents of a state education system that strongly promotes and inculcates civic values. It is more controversially used by or for proponents of a strong nation-state capable of resisting undesirable foreign interference.

== History ==
=== Foundation ===
When the Estates General of 1789 in France convened in May–June 1789 at the Palace of Versailles, the Jacobin club, originating as the Club Breton, comprised exclusively a group of Breton representatives attending those Estates General. Deputies from other regions throughout France soon joined. Early members included the dominating comte de Mirabeau, Parisian deputy Abbé Sieyès, Dauphiné deputy Antoine Barnave, Jérôme Pétion, the Abbé Grégoire, Charles Lameth, Alexandre Lameth, Artois deputy Robespierre, the duc d'Aiguillon, and La Revellière-Lépeaux. At this time meetings occurred in secret, and few traces remain concerning what took place or where the meetings convened.

=== Transfer to Paris ===
By the March on Versailles in October 1789, the club, still entirely composed of deputies, reverted to being a provincial caucus for National Constituent Assembly deputies from Brittany. The club was re-founded in November 1789 as the Société de la Révolution, inspired in part by a letter sent from the Revolution Society of London to the Assembly congratulating the French on regaining their liberty.

To accommodate growing membership, the group rented for its meetings the refectory of the Dominican monastery of the "Jacobins" in the Rue Saint-Honoré, adjacent to the seat of the Assembly. They changed their name to Société des amis de la Constitution in late January, though by this time, their opponents had already concisely dubbed them "Jacobins", a nickname originally given to French Dominicans because their first house in Paris was in the Rue Saint-Jacques.

=== Growth ===
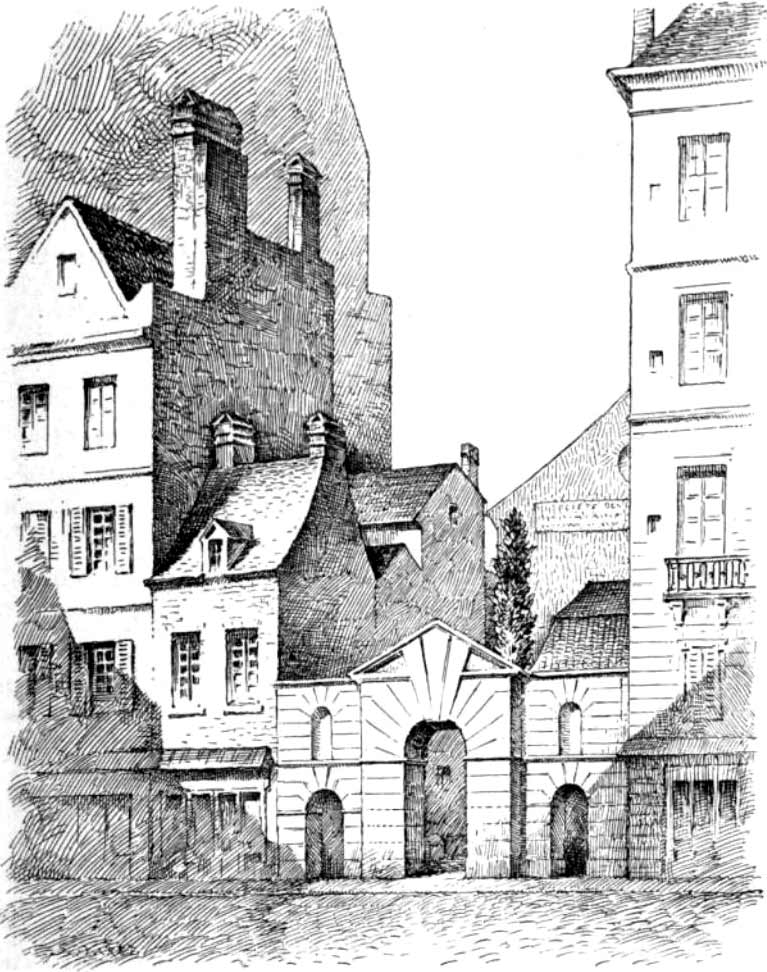
The Jacobin Club was in the Rue Saint-Honoré, Paris.

Once in Paris, the club soon extended its membership to others besides deputies. All citizens were allowed to enter, and even foreigners were welcomed: the English writer Arthur Young joined the club in this manner on 18 January 1790. Jacobin Club meetings soon became a place for radical and rousing oratory that pushed for republicanism, widespread education, universal suffrage, separation of church and state, and other reforms.

On 8 February 1790, the society became formally constituted on this broader basis by the adoption of the rules drawn up by Barnave, which were issued with the signature of the duc d'Aiguillon, the president. The club's objectives were defined as such:

1. To discuss in advance questions to be decided by the National Assembly.
2. To work for the establishment and strengthening of the constitution in accordance with the spirit of the preamble (that is, of respect for legally constituted authority and the Declaration of the Rights of Man and of the Citizen).
3. To correspond with other societies of the same kind which should be formed in the realm.

At the same time the rules of order of election were settled, and the constitution of the club determined. There was to be a president, elected every month, four secretaries, a treasurer, and committees elected to superintend elections and presentations, the correspondence, and the administration of the club. Any member who by word or action showed that his principles were contrary to the constitution and the rights of man was to be expelled.

By the 7th article the club decided to admit as associates similar societies in other parts of France and to maintain with them a regular correspondence. By 10 August 1790 there were already one hundred and fifty-two affiliated clubs; the attempts at counter-revolution led to a great increase of their number in the spring of 1791, and by the close of the year the Jacobins had a network of branches all over France. At the peak there were at least 7,000 chapters throughout France, with a membership estimated at a half-million or more. It was this widespread yet highly centralized organization that gave to the Jacobin Club great power.

=== Character ===
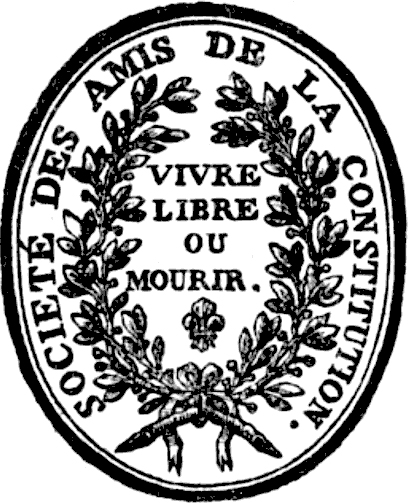
Seal of the Jacobin Club from 1789 to 1792, during the transition from absolutism to constitutional monarchy

By early 1791, clubs like the Jacobins, the Club des Cordeliers and the Cercle Social were increasingly dominating French political life. Numbers of men were members of two or more of such clubs. Women were not accepted as members of the Jacobin Club (nor of most other clubs), but they were allowed to follow the discussions from the balconies. The rather high subscription of the Jacobin Club confined its membership to well-off men. The Jacobins claimed to speak on behalf of the people but were themselves not of 'the people': contemporaries saw the Jacobins as a club of the bourgeoisie.

As far as the central society in Paris was concerned, it was composed almost entirely of professional men (such as the lawyer Robespierre) and well-to-do bourgeoisie (like the brewer Santerre). From the start, however, other elements were also present. Besides the teenage son of the Duc d'Orléans, Louis Philippe, a future king of France, aristocrats such as the duc d'Aiguillon, the prince de Broglie, and the vicomte de Noailles, and the bourgeoisie formed the mass of the members. The club further included people like "père" Michel Gérard, a peasant proprietor from Tuel-en-Montgermont, in Brittany, whose rough common sense was admired as the oracle of popular wisdom, and whose countryman's waistcoat and plaited hair were later on to become the model for the Jacobin fashion.

The Jacobin Club supported the monarchy up until the very Eve of the Republic (20 September 1792). They did not support the petition of 17 July 1791 for the king's dethronement, but instead published their own petition calling for replacement of King Louis XVI.

The departure of the conservative members of the Jacobin Club to form their own Feuillants Club in July 1791 to some extent radicalized the Jacobin Club.

=== Polarization between Robespierrists and Girondins ===
Late 1791, a group of Jacobins in the Legislative Assembly advocated war with Prussia and Austria. Most prominent among them was Brissot; other members were Pierre Vergniaud, Fauchet, Maximin Isnard, Jean-Marie Roland.

Maximilien Robespierre, also a Jacobin, strongly pleaded against war with Prussia and Austria – but in the Jacobin Club, not in the Assembly where he was not seated. Disdainfully, Robespierre addressed those Jacobin war promoters as 'the faction from the Gironde'; some, not all of them, were indeed from department Gironde. The Jacobins finally rid itself of Feuillants in its midst; the number of clubs increased considerably, convening became a nationwide fad. In March 1792, in retaliation for their opposition to war with Austria the Feuillant ministers were forced out by the Girondins. The Assembly in April 1792 finally decided for war, thus following the 'Girondin' line on it, but Robespierre's place among the Jacobins had now become much more prominent.

From then on, a polarization process started among the members of the Jacobin Club, between a group around Robespierre – after September 1792 called 'Montagnards' or 'Montagne', in English 'the Mountain' – and the Girondins. These groups never had any official status, nor official memberships. The Mountain was not even very homogenous in their political views: what united them was their aversion to the Girondins.

The Legislative Assembly, governing France from October 1791 until September 1792, was dominated by men like Brissot, Isnard and Roland: Girondins. But after June 1792, Girondins visited less and less the Jacobin Club, where Robespierre, their fierce opponent, grew more and more dominant.

=== Opposition between Montagnards and Girondins in the National Convention ===
On 21 September 1792, after the fall of the monarchy the title assumed by the Jacobin Club after the promulgation of the constitution of 1791 (Société des amis de la constitution séants aux Jacobins à Paris) was changed to Société des Jacobins, amis de la liberté et de l'égalité (Society of the Jacobins, Friends of Freedom and Equality). In the newly elected National Convention, governing France as of 21 September 1792, Maximilien Robespierre made his comeback in the center of French power. Together with his 25-year-old protégé Louis Antoine de Saint-Just, Marat, Danton and other associates they took places on the left side on the highest seats of the session room: therefore that group around and led by Robespierre was called The Mountain (French: la Montagne, les Montagnards).

Some historians prefer to identify a parliamentary group around Robespierre as Jacobins, which can be confusing because not all Montagnards were Jacobin and their primal enemies, the Girondins, were originally also Jacobins. By September 1792, Robespierre indeed had also become the dominant voice in the Jacobin Club. Since late 1791, the Girondins became opponents of Robespierre, taking their place on the right side of the session room of the convention. By this time, they stopped visiting the Jacobin Club.

Those parliamentary groups, such as the Montagnards and the Girondins, never had any official status. As a result, historians estimate the Girondins in the Convention at 150 men strong and the Montagnards at 120. The remaining 480 of the 750 deputies of the convention were called the Plain (French: la Plaine) and managed to keep some speed in the debates while Girondins and Montagnards were mainly occupied with nagging the opposite side. Most Ministries were manned by friends or allies of the Girondins, but while the Girondins were stronger than the Montagnards outside Paris, inside Paris the Montagnards were much more popular, implying that the public galleries of the convention were always loudly cheering for Montagnards, while jeering at Girondins speaking.

On 6 April 1793, the convention established the Comité de salut public (Committee of Public Prosperity, also translated as Committee of Public Safety) as sort of executive government of nine, later twelve members, always accountable to the National Convention. Initially, it counted no Girondins and only one or two Montagnards, but gradually the influence of Montagnards in the Committee grew.

=== Girondins disbarred from the National Convention ===
Early April 1793, Minister of War Pache said to the National Convention that the 22 leaders of the Girondins should be banned. Later that month, the Girondin Guadet accused the Montagnard Marat of 'preaching plunder and murder' and trying 'to destroy the sovereignty of the people'. A majority of the Convention agreed to put Marat on trial, but the court of justice quickly acquitted Marat. This apparent victory of the Montagnards intensified their antipathies of the Girondins, and more proposals were vented to get rid of the Girondins.

On both 18 and 25 May 1793, the acting president of the convention, Isnard, a Girondin, warned that the disturbances and disorder on the galleries and around the convention would finally lead the country to anarchy and civil war, and he threatened on 25 May: "If anything should befall to the representatives of the nation, I declare, in the name of France, that all of Paris will be obliterated". The next day, Robespierre said in the Jacobin Club that the people should "rise up against the corrupted deputies" in the convention. On 27 May, both Girondins and Montagnards accused the other party of propagating civil war.

On 2 June 1793, the convention was besieged in its Tuileries Palace by a crowd of around 80,000 armed soldiers, clamorously on the hand of the Montagnards. In a chaotic session a decree was adopted that day by the convention, expelling 22 leading Girondins from the convention, including Lanjuinais, Isnard and Fauchet.

=== Montagnard rule and civil war ===
Around June 1793, Maximilien Robespierre and some of his associates (Montagnards) gained greater power in France. Many of them, like Robespierre himself, were Jacobin: Fouché, Collot d'Herbois, Billaud-Varenne, Marat, Danton, Saint-Just. Three other powerful Montagnards were not known as Jacobin: Barère, Hébert and Couthon. In 'culture wars' and history writing after 1793 however, the group around Robespierre dominating French politics in June 1793–July 1794 was often designated as 'Jacobins'. Many of these Montagnards (and Jacobins) entered, or were already, in the de facto executive government of France, the Committee of Public Prosperity (or Public Safety): Barère was in it since April 1793 until at least October 1793, Danton served there from April until July 1793, Couthon and Saint-Just had entered the Committee in May, Robespierre entered it in July, Collot d'Herbois in September and Billaud-Varenne also around September 1793. Robespierre for his steadfast adherence to and defence of his views received the nickname and reputation of l'Incorruptible (The Incorruptible or The Unassailable).

Several deposed Girondin-Jacobin Convention deputies, among them Jean-Marie Roland, Brissot, Pétion, Louvet, Buzot and Guadet, left Paris to help organize revolts in more than 60 of the 83 departments against the politicians and Parisians, mainly Montagnards, that had seized power over the Republic. The government in Paris called such revolts 'federalist' which was not accurate: most did not strive for regional autonomy but for a different central government.

In October 1793, 21 former Girondin Convention deputies were sentenced to death for supporting an insurrection in Caen. In March 1794, the Montagnard Hébert and some followers were sentenced to death; in April the Montagnard Danton and 13 of his followers were sentenced to death; in both cases after insinuation by Robespierre in the Convention that those "internal enemies" were promoting 'the triumph of tyranny'. Meanwhile, the Montagnard-dominated government resorted also to harsh measures to repress what they considered counter-revolution, conspiracy and "enemies of freedom" in the provinces outside Paris, resulting in 17,000 death sentences between September 1793 and July 1794 in all of France.

In late June 1794, three colleagues on the Committee of Public Prosperity/Safety – Billaud-Varenne, Collot d'Herbois and Carnot – called Robespierre a dictator. On 10 Thermidor, Year II (28 July 1794), at some time in the evening, Louis Legendre was sent out with troops to arrest leading members of the Montagnards at the Hôtel de Ville and the Jacobin Club itself where members had been gathering every Saturday evening. Robespierre and 21 associates including the Jacobin Saint-Just and the Montagnard Couthon were sentenced to death by the National Convention and guillotined.

Probably because of the high level of repressive violence – but also to discredit Robespierre and associates as solely responsible for it – historians have taken up the habit to roughly label the period June 1793–July 1794 as 'Reign of Terror'. Certain later and modern scholars argue that high level of repressive violence occurred at a time when France was menaced by civil war and by a coalition of foreign hostile powers, requiring the discipline of the Terror to mold France into a united Republic capable of resisting this double peril.

=== Closure ===
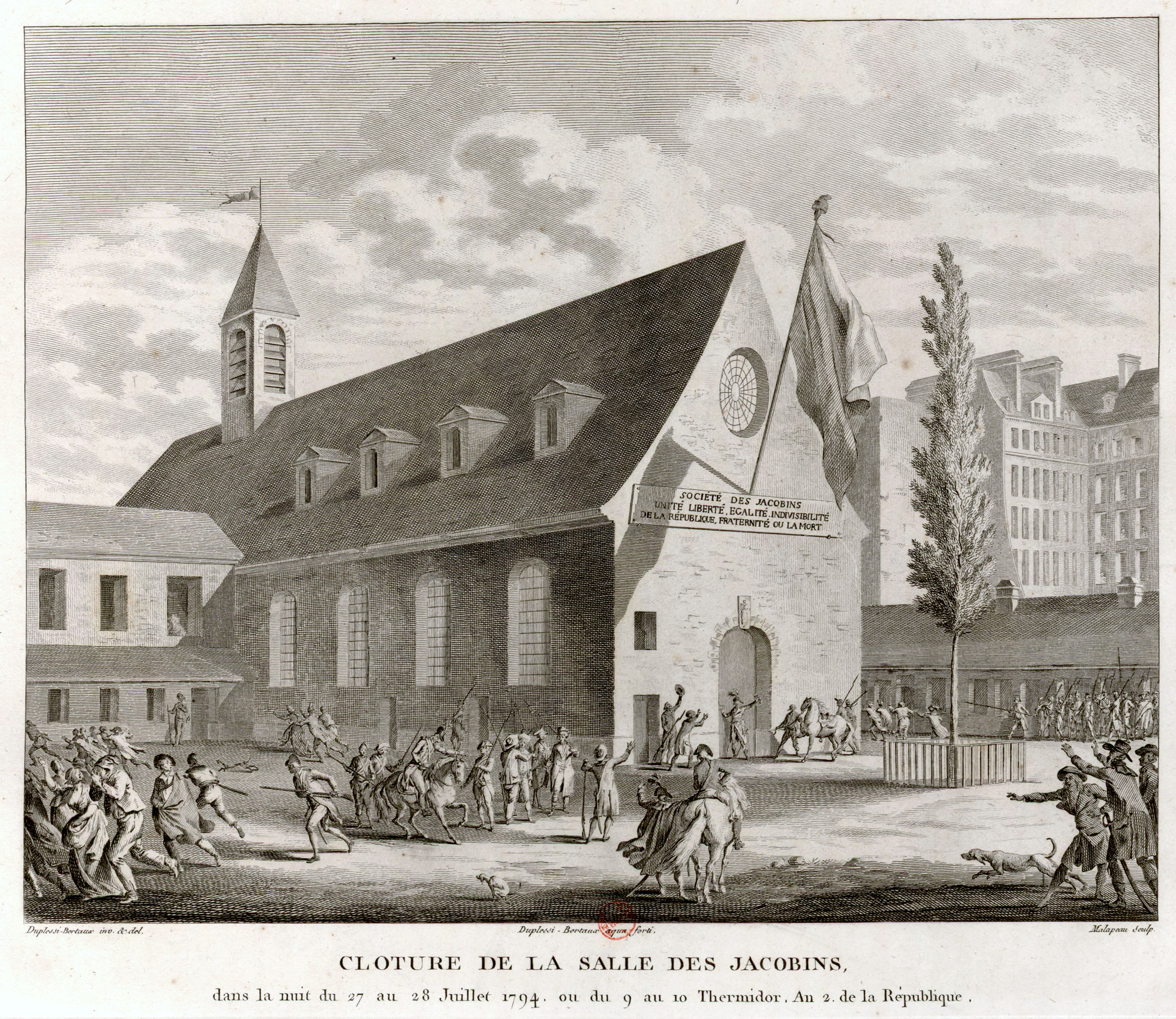
Engraving "Closing of the Jacobin Club, during the night of 27–28 July 1794, or 9–10 Thermidor, year 2 of the Republic"

With the execution of Robespierre and other leading Montagnards and Jacobins, began the Thermidorian Reaction. The Jacobins became targets of Thermidorian and anti-Jacobin papers, with Jacobins lamenting counterrevolutionary pamphlets "poisoning public opinion". The Jacobins disavowed the support they gave Robespierre on 9 Thermidor, yet supported an unpopular return to the Terror. Meanwhile, the society's finances fell into disarray and membership dipped to 600. Further, they were linked to ongoing trials of prominent members of the Terror involved in atrocities in Nantes, especially Jean-Baptiste Carrier.

Organized gangs formed, the jeunesse doree or Muscadins, who harassed and attacked Jacobin members, even assailing the Jacobin Club hall in Paris. On 21 Brumaire, the Convention refused to support enforcement of protection of the club. The Committee of General Security decided to close the Jacobins' meeting hall late that night, resulting in it being padlocked at four in the morning.

The next meeting day, 22 Brumaire (12 November 1794), without debate the National Convention passed a decree permanently closing the Jacobin Club by a nearly unanimous vote. Within a year 93% of the Jacobin clubs were closed throughout the country.

=== Reunion of Jacobin adherents ===
An attempt to reorganize Jacobin adherents was the foundation of the Réunion d'amis de l'égalité et de la liberté, in July 1799, which had its headquarters in the Salle du Manège of the Tuileries, and was thus known as the Club du Manège. It was patronized by Barras, and some two hundred and fifty members of the two councils of the legislature were enrolled as members, including many notable ex-Jacobins. It published a newspaper called the Journal des Libres, proclaimed the apotheosis of Robespierre and Babeuf, and attacked the Directory as a royauté pentarchique. But public opinion was now preponderantly moderate or royalist, and the club was violently attacked in the press and in the streets. The suspicions of the government were aroused; it had to change its meeting-place from the Tuileries to the church of the Jacobins (Temple of Peace) in the Rue du Bac, and in August it was suppressed, after barely a month's existence. Its members avenged themselves on the Directory by supporting Napoleon Bonaparte.

== Influence ==
=== Political influence ===
The Jacobin movement encouraged sentiments of patriotism and liberty amongst the populace. The movement's contemporaries, such as the King Louis XVI, located the effectiveness of the revolutionary movement not "in the force and 1789 bayonets of soldiers, guns, cannons and shells but by the marks of political power". Ultimately, the Jacobins were to control several key political bodies, in particular the Committee of Public Safety and, through it, the National Convention, which was not only a legislature but also took upon itself executive and judicial functions. The Jacobins as a political force were seen as "less selfish, more patriotic, and more sympathetic to the Paris Populace."

In power, the Jacobins completed the abolition of feudalism in France that had been formally decided 4 August 1789 but had been held in check by a clause requiring compensation for the abrogation of the feudal privileges.

Robespierre entered the political arena at the very beginning of the Revolution, having been elected to represent Artois at the Estates General. Robespierre was viewed as the quintessential political force of the Jacobin Movement, thrusting ever deeper the dagger of liberty within the despotism of the Monarchy. As a disciple of Rousseau, Robespierre's political views were rooted in Rousseau's notion of the social contract, which promoted "the rights of man". Robespierre particularly favored the rights of the broader population to eat, for example, over the rights of individual merchants. "I denounce the assassins of the people to you and you respond, 'let them act as they will.' In such a system, all is against society; all favors the grain merchants." Robespierre famously elaborated this conception in his speech on 2 December 1792: "What is the first goal of society? To maintain the imprescribable rights of man. What is the first of these rights? The right to exist."

The ultimate political vehicle for the Jacobin movement was the Reign of Terror overseen by the Committee of Public Safety, who were given executive powers to purify and unify the Republic. The Committee instituted requisitioning, rationing, and conscription to consolidate new citizen armies. They instituted the Terror as a means of combating those they perceived as enemies within: Robespierre declared, "the first maxim of your policy ought to be to lead the people by reason and the people's enemies by terror."

The meeting place of the Fraternal Society of Patriots of Both Sexes was an old library room of the convent which hosted the Jacobins, and it was suggested that the Fraternal Society grew out of the regular occupants of a special gallery allotted to women at the Jacobin Club.

Georges Valois, founder of the first non-Italian fascist party Faisceau, claimed the roots of fascism stemmed from the Jacobin movement.

==== Left-wing politics ====
The political rhetoric and populist ideas espoused by the Jacobins would lead to the development of the modern leftist movements throughout the 19th and 20th century, with Jacobinism being the political foundation of almost all leftist schools of thought including anarchism, communism and socialism. The Paris Commune was seen as the revolutionary successor to the Jacobins. The undercurrent of radical and populist tendencies espoused and enacted by the Jacobins would create a complete cultural and societal shock within the traditional and conservative governments of Europe, leading to new political ideas of society emerging. Jacobin rhetoric would lead to increasing secularization and skepticism towards the governments of Europe throughout the 1800s. This complex and complete revolution in political, societal and cultural structure, caused in part by the Jacobins, had lasting impact throughout Europe, with such societal revolutions throughout the 1800s culminating in the Revolutions of 1848.

Jacobin populism and complete structural destruction of the old order led to an increasingly revolutionary spirit throughout Europe and such changes would contribute to new political foundations. Leftist organizations would take different elements from Jacobin's core foundation. Anarchists took influence from the Jacobins use of mass movements, direct democracy and left-wing populism. The Jacobin philosophy of a complete dismantling of an old system, with completely radical and new structures, is historically seen as one of the most revolutionary and important movements throughout modern history.

=== Cultural influence ===
The cultural influence of the Jacobin movement during the French Revolution revolved around the creation of the Citizen. As commented in Jean-Jacques Rousseau's 1762 book The Social Contract, "Citizenship is the expression of a sublime reciprocity between individual and General will." This view of citizenship and the General Will, once empowered, could simultaneously embrace the Declaration of the Rights of Man and of the Citizen and adopt the French Constitution of 1793, then immediately suspend that constitution and all ordinary legality and institute Revolutionary Tribunals that did not grant a presumption of innocence.

The Jacobins saw themselves as constitutionalists, dedicated to the Rights of Man and in particular, to the declaration's principle of "preservation of the natural rights of liberty, property, security, and resistance to oppression" (Article II of the Declaration). The constitution reassured the protection of personal freedom and social progress within French society. The cultural influence of the Jacobin movement was effective in reinforcing these rudiments, developing a milieu for revolution. The Constitution was admired by most Jacobins as the foundation of the emerging republic and of the rise of citizenship.

The Jacobins rejected both the church and atheism. They set up new religious cults, the Cult of Reason and later Cult of the Supreme Being, to replace Catholicism. They advocated deliberate government-organized religion as a substitute for both the rule of law and a replacement of mob violence as inheritors of a war that at the time of their rise to power threatened the very existence of the Revolution. Once in power, the Jacobins completed the overthrow of the Ancien Régime and successfully defended the Revolution from military defeat. They consolidated republicanism in France and contributed greatly to the secularism and the sense of nationhood that have marked all French republican regimes to this day. However, their ruthless and unjudicial methods discredited the Revolution in the eyes of many. The resulting Thermidorian Reaction shuttered all of the Jacobin clubs, removed all Jacobins from power and condemned many, well beyond the ranks of the Mountain, to death or exile.

== List of presidents of the Jacobin Club ==
In the beginning every two months, later every two weeks a new president was chosen:

- 1789 – Jacques-François Menou, Isaac René Guy le Chapelier
- 1790 – Honoré Gabriel Riqueti, comte de Mirabeau, Dubois-Crancé; Maximilien Robespierre, end of March-3 June 1790
- 1791 – Pierre-Antoine Antonelle;
- 1792 – Jean-Paul Marat
- 1793 – Maximilien Robespierre, 7–28 August 1793
- 1794 – Joseph Fouché, 11 July; Nicolas Francois Vivier, 27 July; abolished in November

== Electoral results ==
Election year	No. of overall votes	% of overall vote	No. of overall seats won	+/–	Leader
1791	774,000 (3rd)	18.3	136 / 745	New	Jacques Pierre Brissot
National Convention
1792	907,200 (2nd)	26.7	200 / 749	▲64	Maximilien Robespierre
Legislative Body
1795	Did not participate	Did not participate	64 / 750	▼136	

== See also ==
- Jacobin Club of Mysore
- Jacobins Convent, Nantes
- Society of the Rights of Man
- Left-wing terrorism

People'

- Pierre-Antoine Antonelle
- Jeanne Odo

== Bibliography ==
- Schama, Simon (1989). Citizens: A Chronicle of the French Revolution. Knopf. ISBN 0-394-55948-7.
- Shusterman, Noah (2014). The French Revolution. Faith, Desire, and Politics. Routledge: London/New York.
- Thompson, J.M. (1988). Robespierre. New York: B. Blackwell. ISBN 978-0631155041.
