= Charles Malo François Lameth =

French politician and soldier

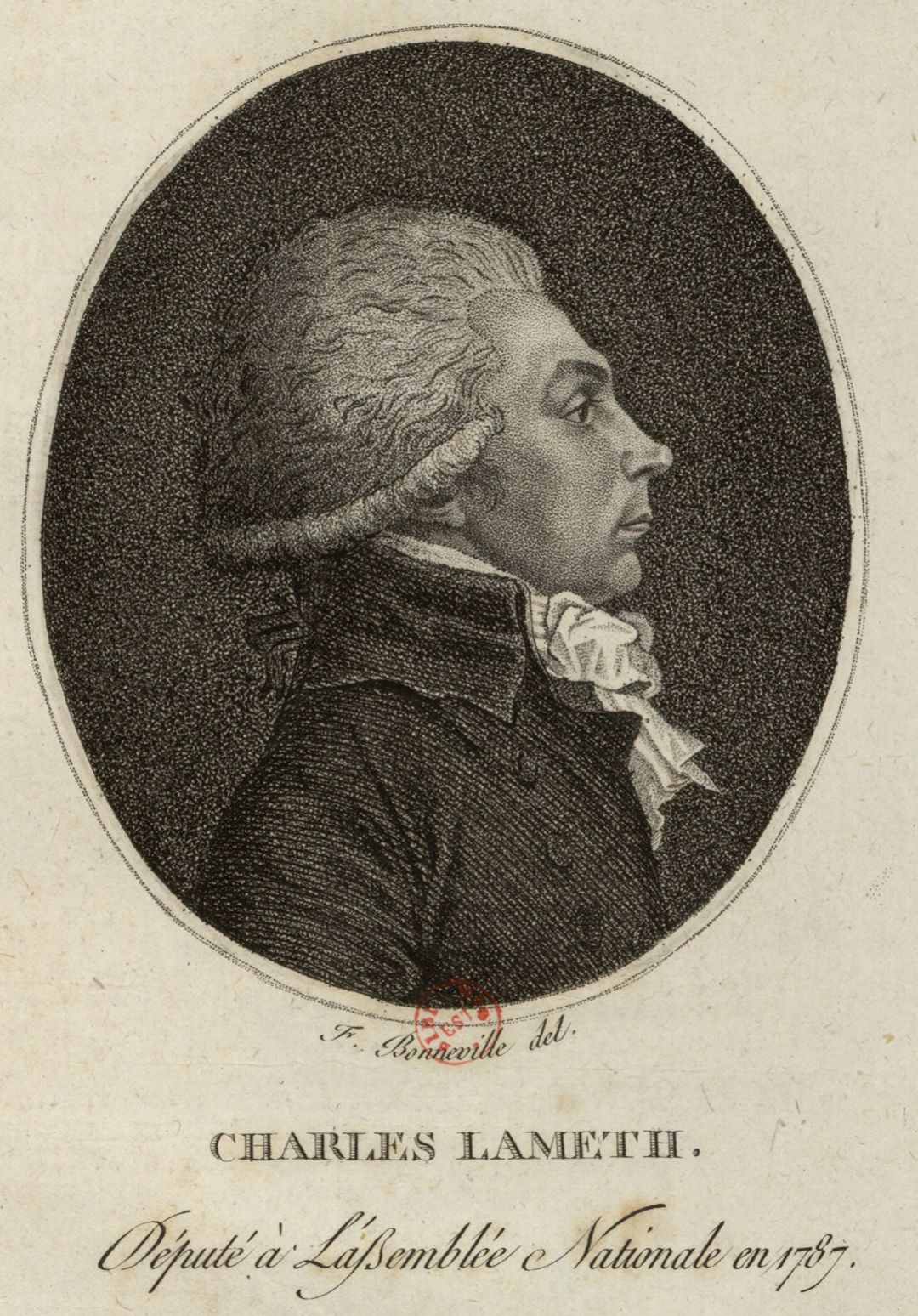
- Lameth by François Bonneville, 1796
- Born: 5 October 1757; Paris, France
- Died: 28 December 1832 (aged 75)
- Spouse: Marie Anne Picot
- Parent(s): Louis Charles de Lameth; Marie Thérèse de Broglie
- Relatives: Alexandre-Théodore-Victor, comte de Lameth (brother); Théodore de Lameth (brother)

Charles Malo François Lameth (French pronunciation: [ʃaʁl malo fʁɑ̃swa lamɛt]; 5 October 1757 – 28 December 1832) was a French politician and soldier.

== Early life ==
Charles Malo François Lameth was born on 5 October 1757 in Paris. His father was Louise Charles de Lameth and his mother, Marie Thérèse de Broglie. His mother was the sister of the Marshall de Broglie and a favourite of Marie Antoinette.

== Career ==
He was in the retinue of the comte d'Artois (future King Charles X), and became an officer in a cuirassier regiment. He served in the American War of Independence, and was a hero of the Battle of Yorktown in 1781. He was a Knight of the Order of Malta and a Knight of the Order of Saint Louis.

Although he married a rich heiress from Saint Domingue, he was a founding member of the Society of the Friends of the Blacks in 1788.

He was deputy to the Estates-General of 1789, for the nobility, and was one of the first aristocrats to renounce his privileges on the night of 4 August 1789. He continued to serve in the National Assembly and National Constituent Assembly and in January 1791 repaid to the Treasury the 60,000 francs it had cost Louis XVI to provide him and his brothers with an education at the École Militaire. In November 1790 he fought a duel with the Duc de Castries. The duke wounded him and it was briefly feared that he had tipped his sword with poison. Lameth was so popular that a mob stormed Castries' house in revenge. As the Assembly began to divide into factions, Lameth, a constitutional monarchist, was identified with the Feuillants and he was arrested in Rouen on 12 August 1792 for protesting against the Attack on the Tuileries. Since the French Revolution moved toward a Republic, he emigrated to Hamburg.

He returned to France under the Consulate, was appointed Brigadier General in 1809 and fought in the Spanish War, and was appointed governor of Würzburg (in the Duchy of Würzburg) under the First Empire. In 1814, he rose to the rank of Lieutenant General. Like his brother Alexandre Lameth (but unlike his other one, Théodore de Lameth), Charles joined the Bourbon camp after the Restoration, succeeding Alexandre as deputy in 1829. In the final years of his life, he was nonetheless a noted supporter of the July Monarchy.

== Personal life ==
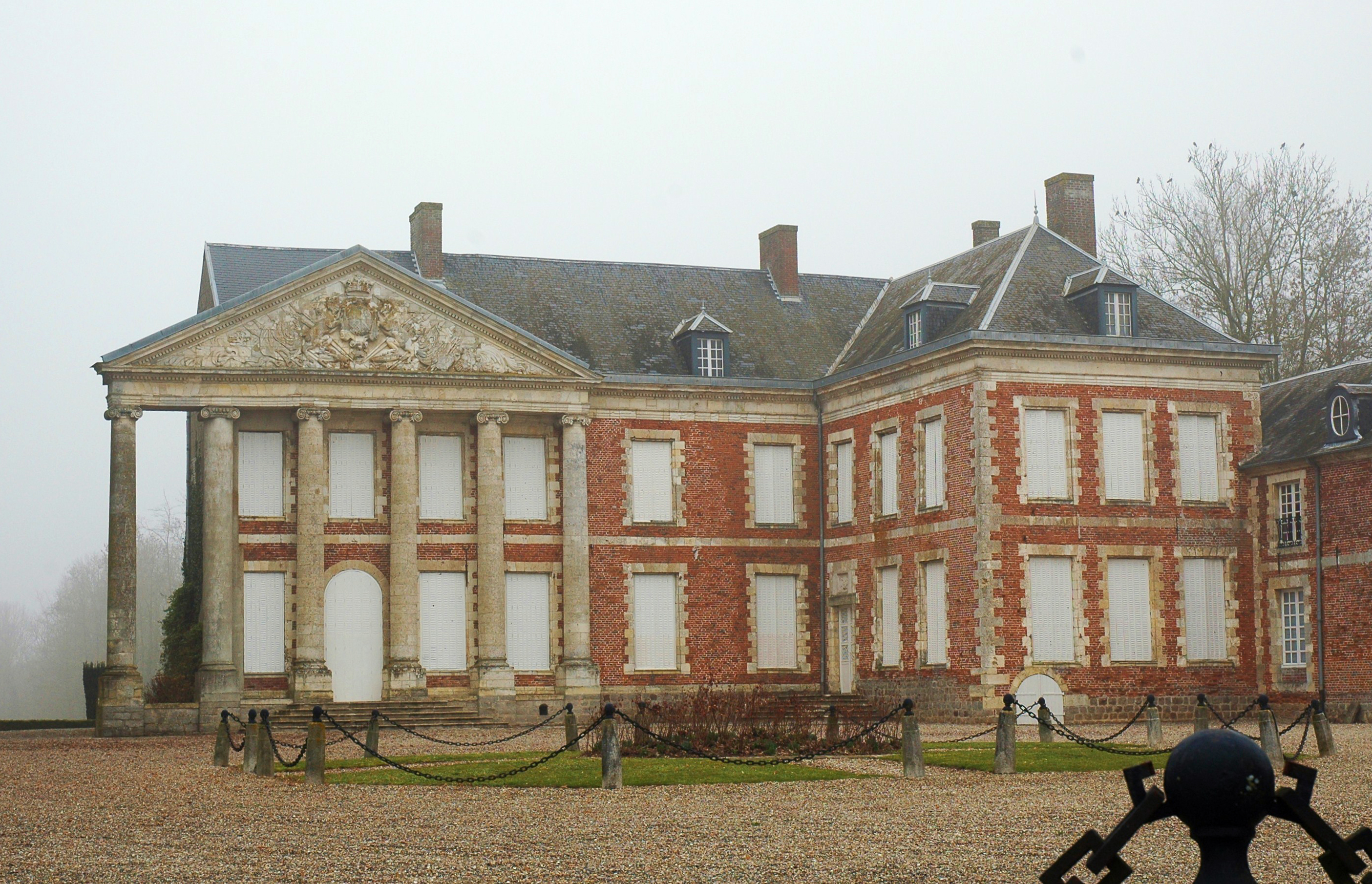
Château d'Hénencourt.

He married Marie Anne Picot. They had two children. They resided at the Château d'Hénencourt in Hénencourt, Somme.

He died on 28 December 1832.

== Bibliography ==
- 1790 - Remontrances a mon neveu Charles de Lameth
- 1790 - Recit fidele et exact de ce qui s'est passé entre M (le Duc de) Castries et M. (le Comte) Charles de Lameth
- 1790 - Lettre du père éternel, a M. de Lameth
- 1790 - Lettre de Charles Lameth. A son correspondant de Versailles M. Godad
- 1790 - Diner patriotique de M. Charles Lameth, le samedi 23 mai 1790
- 1790 - Attention. je le maintiens et le soutiens : il faut parler net pour se faire entendre
- 1791 - Grand assassinat de Monsieur Charles Lameth, denoncé par lui-meme a l'Assemblée nationale; ou Memoire a consulter et consultation pour un grenadier de la Garde-nationale
