= Monarchiens =

Monarchist Club Club monarchique
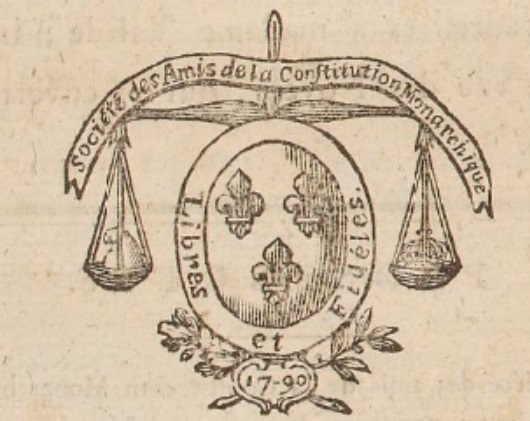
- President: Jean Joseph Mounier (1789); Pierre Victor, baron Malouet (1789–1791)
- Founded: 1 December 1789; 236 years ago
- Dissolved: 18 June 1791; 235 years ago
- Merged into: Feuillants Club
- Headquarters: 8, rue de la Michodière, Paris
- Ideology: Constitutional monarchism Conservatism; Conservative liberalism Moderatism
- Political position: Centre
- Colours: Blue White (monarchy's colours)

The Friends of the Monarchist Constitution (French: Amis de la Constitution Monarchique), commonly known as the Monarchist Club (French: Club monarchique) or the Monarchiens, were one of the revolutionary factions in the earliest stages of the French Revolution. The Monarchiens were briefly a centrist stabilising force criticized by the left-wing of the National Constituent Assembly, the spectators in the galleries and the patriotic press. Established in August 1789, the Monarchist Club was quickly swept away. Specifically, the brief movement developed when the Revolution was shifting away from the Ancien Régime during the Spring of 1789 and was defeated by the end of 1789. Subsequently, the term itself is usually derogatory.

== Monarchien positions ==
Monarchiens were once viewed as contributors to the Third Estate. They differed from Emmanuel Joseph Sieyès and Honoré Gabriel Riqueti, comte de Mirabeau as they did not "speak the language of democracy". Instead, they formed their views based on the liberalism influences of the years of the Enlightenment and Constitution of the United Kingdom. They sought fairness under law and pushed for a working constitution. The Monarchiens position favored voting and common deliberations. It aimed to merge the rights of the royal authority with the rights of the common man. This idea was in fact part of their downfall as the changes brought about by the Revolution were far more aggressive than what the Monarchiens viewed as acceptable. Specifically, the Monarchiens were unable to understand and reform to the importance of political legitimacy when it came to discussing the constitutional process. In fact, they sought to establish a free government without substituting one power for another, but rather redefining the existing powers of the monarchy.

== Founder, Jean-Joseph Mounier ==
The group was founded and led by Jean Joseph Mounier, who was born in 1758. Though Mounier was neither graceful nor eloquent in his speeches, he was able to influence many with his strength and consistency. Among his followers were Pierre Victor, baron de Malouet, Nicolas Bergasse, Gérard de Lally-Tollendal and Stanislas Marie Adélaïde, comte de Clermont-Tonnerre. On 9 July, Mounier's views of the government's political position were outlined in a statement to the National Constituent Assembly. The Assembly ultimately voted against the introduced Monarchiens views of Mounier on 10 and 11 September. The rejection led to the resignation of Mounier.

- A new party was formed in December 1789 by one of the original Monarchiens members, Clermont-Tonnerre, called the Amis de la Constitution Monarchique.
- The Monarchiens party was established under the authority of King Louis XVI.
- The Monarchiens movement was founded by Jean Joseph Mounier (1758–1806). Among the followers of the Monarchiens were liberal nobles including Lally-Tollendal, Clermont-Tonnerre and Malouet.
- The Monarchiens were a conservative faction with the National Assembly. For the most part and although briefly, the Monarchiens party was well organized and took an active role in Constituent debates.
- Mounier supported another legislative Chamber and more royal authority.
- The Monarchiens, specifically Mounier, "wanted a compromise between the old aristocracy and the new elite, based on an absolute veto for ordinary laws and a bicameral legislature".
- Mounier's views appeared in a pamphlet that was published titled Nouvelles observations sur les Etats – Generaux, which introduced the Monarchiens ideas about law and government.
- Within the Monarchiens party, there are three distinct groups of members. The first is the Dauphinois delegation, including the archbishop of Vienne. The second is the group of elite members of society, including bishop of Langres, Clermont-Tonnerre and Lally-Tollendal. The third group was the deputies to the Third Estate, including Bergasse and Malouet.
- Bergasse published his Monarchiens view in pamphlets and called for the unity between the throne and Third Estates.
- Monarchiens politics were more authoritarian and hierarchical.
- The Monarchiens organized for elections. The elections carried out in September 1789 demonstrated the popularity of the Monarchiens movement as the movement's candidates received many of the votes.
- One of the laws passed which emphasized the party's political views was that in order for a royal veto to be overwritten, the same law needed to be passed by three straight legislatures.
- After Mounier's resignation, the Monarchiens dream continued to live out until the end of the Constituent Assembly. This was due to the efforts of Malouet, Clermont-Tonnerre, Virieu and others.
- The clubs formed by these men after Mounier left the organization were Club de Impartiaux and Club Monarchique.

== See also ==
- Antoine Barnave
- Auvergne (province)
- Dauphiné
- Emmanuel Joseph Sieyès
- The English Constitution
- Estates-General of 1789
- Jacques Necker
- Louis XVI
- Montesquieu
- Normandy
