= Feuillants (political group) =

Society of the Friends of the Constitution Société des Amis de la Constitution
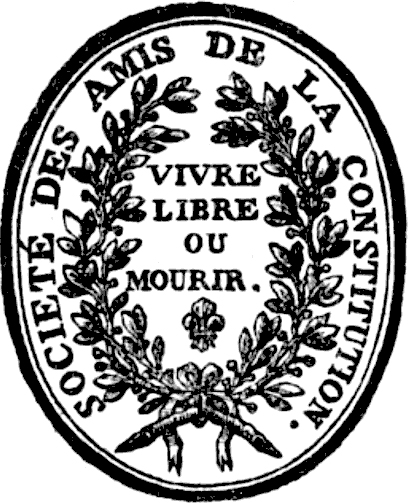
- President: Antoine Barnave; Alexandre de Lameth; Adrien Duport
- Founded: 18 July 1791; 235 years ago
- Dissolved: 10 August 1792; 234 years ago
- Merger of: Modéré; Jacobins; Monarchiens; Club de 1789
- Succeeded by: Club de Clichy
- Headquarters: Rue Saint-Honoré, Paris
- Newspaper: La Gazette
- Ideology: Moderatism; Conservatism; Classical liberalism; Conservative liberalism; Constitutional monarchism
- Political position: Centre (Note: On 1 October 1791, the Feuillant sat on the right side of the National Assembly. Parliamentary groups never had any official status and thus historians generally tend to estimate that the 1791 French legislative election had resulted in a majority of around 350 moderate constitutional deputies (the Plain), a right-wing made up of more than 250 Feuillants (divided into Fayettists and Lametists), and a left-wing where around 136 deputies were registered with the Jacobins (even if the Girondin general staff was not very assiduous, preferring the salons), among which several provincials (including Armand Gensonné, Marguerite-Élie Guadet, and Pierre Victurnien Vergniaud, originally from Gironde, hence the name of the Girondins), with a small group of more advanced democrats (Lazare Carnot, Georges Couthon, and Jean-Baptiste Robert Lindet). Deputies of the Plain managed to keep some speed in the debates while the Girondins and the Montagnards were mainly occupied with nagging the opposite side.)
- Colours: Blue White (monarchy's colours)

Party flag

The Society of the Friends of the Constitution (Note: This was the original name of the Jacobin Club until its radicalization after the Republic's birth.) (French: Société des Amis de la Constitution), better known as Feuillants Club (French pronunciation: [fœjɑ̃] French: Club des Feuillants), was a political grouping that emerged during the French Revolution. It came into existence on 16 July 1791. The assembly was split between the Feuillants on the right (who sought to preserve the position of the king and supported the proposed plan of the National Constituent Assembly for a constitutional monarchy), and the Jacobins on the left (who wished to press for a continuation of the overthrow of Louis XVI). It represented the last and most vigorous attempt of the moderate constitutional monarchists to steer the course of the revolution away from the radical Jacobins.

The Feuillant deputies publicly split with the Jacobins when they published a pamphlet on 16 July 1791, protesting the Jacobin plan to participate in the popular demonstrations against Louis XVI on the Champ de Mars the following day. Initially the group had 264 ex-Jacobin deputies as members, including most of the members of the correspondence committee. The group held meetings in a former monastery of the Feuillant monks on the Rue Saint-Honoré in Paris and came to be popularly called the Club des Feuillants. They called themselves the Amis de la Constitution. The group was led by Antoine Barnave, Alexandre de Lameth, and Adrien Duport.

== History ==
As the French Constitution of 1791 began to take its final shape, many erstwhile radical deputies such as Barnave and Le Chapelier wished for the central role played by such popular societies as the Jacobins early in the French Revolution to come to an end. The activism of the people had been vital to the preservation of the Revolution in the early days of the National Assembly, but their purpose had been fulfilled and it was time for direct democracy to give way to the leadership of elected representatives. This conviction was greatly affirmed with the Champ de Mars Massacre (17 July 1791).

Within days, a mass exodus of moderate deputies abandoned the Jacobin club in favour of a new organisation, the Feuillant club. This new society would wage a struggle throughout the summer with the Jacobins for the allegiance of the provincial affiliates and the Parisian crowds, a contest they would ultimately lose. According to the Feuillant ethos, popular societies could have no other role than as meetings of friends to hold private political discussions—their meetings should never step across the threshold of their assemblies and evolve into concerted public political action.

In his capacity as chairman of the Constitutional Committee, Le Chapelier presented to the National Assembly in its final sessions a law restricting the rights of popular societies to undertake concerted political action, including the right to correspond with one another. It passed 30 September 1791 and by the virtue of obeying this law the moderate Feuillants embraced obsolescence. By ignoring it, the radical Jacobins emerged as the most vital political force of the French Revolution.

In the wave of revulsion against popular movements that followed the Champ de Mars Massacre, through his activity on the Committee of Revisions (charged with separating out the constitutional decrees from the ordinary legislation of the National Assembly) Barnave was able to ingratiate himself and his allies to Louis XVI by securing for the Crown such powers as appointments of ambassadors, army commanders and ministers. The king returned the favour by taking Barnave as his chief advisor. At the opening of the Legislative Assembly, Louis XVI delivered a speech written by Barnave and for the next six months France was governed by what was known as the Feuillant Ministry.

In March 1792, in retaliation for their opposition to war with Austria the Feuillant ministers were forced out by the Girondins. Labelled by their opponents as royalists, they were targeted after the fall of the monarchy. In August 1792, a list of 841 members was published, and they were arrested and tried for treason. Barnave was guillotined on 29 November 1793. The name survived for a few months as an insulting label for moderates, royalists, and aristocrats.

== Ideology and views ==
The Feuillant party was formed to protect a conception of power. Its goals were to neutralize royalists by gaining the support of the moderate right, to isolate the democrats from the majority of patriotic deputies, to withstand Jacobin influences, and to terminate societies that threatened the independence of the National Assembly. As a result, the Feuillants were attacked from both the left and the right.

The Feuillants were against passive citizens being enlisted in the National Guard. They believed the only way to have a strong army was for it to be structured. By favouring elimination of perceived passive citizens from the National Guard (27 April 1791), remaining silent during the debate on the right to petition and post bills, and opposing the political emancipation of the blacks (11–15 May 1791), the triumvirs exhausted their popularity within the space of a few months. They asserted that if the blacks were emancipated, the main source of France's income would be lost. The sugar fields in Saint-Domingue could be taken over and land might also be lost.

== Electoral results ==
Legislative Assembly
Election year	No. of overall votes	% of overall vote	No. of overall seats won	+/–	Leader
1791	1,505,000 (2nd)	35.4	264 / 745	–	Antoine Barnave

== See also ==
- Society of 1789

== Bibliography ==
- Dendena, Francesco. "A new look at Feuillantism: the triumvirate and the movement for war in 1791," French History (2012) 26#1 pp 6–33.
- Diefendorf, Barbara B. "A Monastery in Revolt: Paris's Feuillants in the Holy League." Historical Reflections/Réflexions Historiques (2001): 301–324.
- Furet, Francois, and Mona Ozouf, eds. A Critical Dictionary of the French Revolution (1989) pp 343–350.
- Schama, Simon. Citizens: A Chronicle of the French Revolution (1989).
