= National Constituent Assembly (France) =

Revolutionary legislature of France, 1789–1791

National Constituent Assembly Assemblée nationale constituante
- Kingdom of France

Type
- Type: Unicameral

History
- Established: 9 July 1789
- Disbanded: 30 September 1791
- Preceded by: National Assembly
- Succeeded by: National Legislative Assembly
- Seats: Variable; 1315 in total

Meeting place
- Variable

The National Constituent Assembly (French: Assemblée nationale constituante) was a constituent assembly in the Kingdom of France formed from the National Assembly on 9 July 1789 during the first stages of the French Revolution. It dissolved on 30 September 1791 and was succeeded by the Legislative Assembly.

== Background ==
=== Estates-General ===
The Estates General of 1789, made up of representatives of the three estates, which had not been convened since 1614, met on 5 May 1789. The Estates-General reached a deadlock in its deliberations by 6 May. The representatives of the Third Estate attempted to make the whole body more effective and so met separately from 11 May as the Communes. On 12 June, the Communes invited the other Estates to join them: some members of the First Estate did so the following day. On 17 June 1789, the Communes approved the motion made by Sieyès that declared themselves the National Assembly by a vote of 490 to 90. The Third Estate now believed themselves to be a legitimate authority equal to that of the King. Elements of the First Estate, primarily parish priests who were closer in wealth to the Third Estate compared to the bishops who were closer in wealth to the Second Estate, joined the assembly from 13 June onwards and, on 19 June, the whole of the clergy voted to join the National Assembly. A legislative and a political agenda unfolded.

=== Tennis Court Oath ===
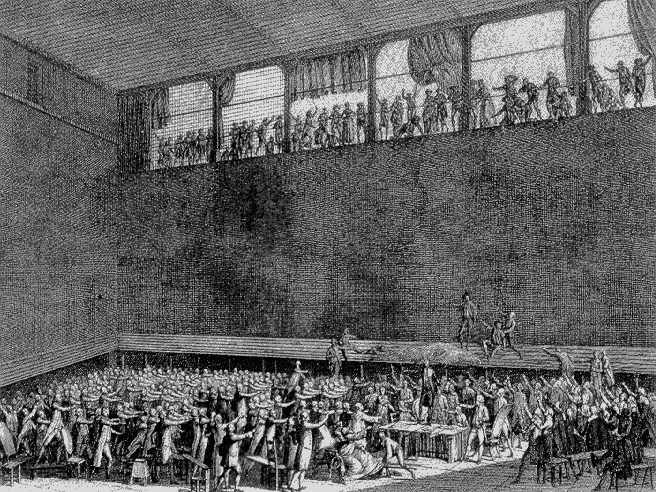
Le serment de Jeu de Paume. Copper plate by Pierre-Gabriel Berthault after a drawing by Jean-Louis Prieur (1789). The representatives swore not to depart until they had given France a new constitution.

There were soon attempts by King Louis XVI and the Second Estate to prevent the delegates from meeting, as well as misunderstandings on both sides about each other's intentions. Locked out of its chamber, the new assembly, led by its president Jean-Sylvain Bailly, was forced to relocate to a nearby tennis court, on 20 June; there, it swore the Tennis Court Oath, promising "not to separate, and to reassemble wherever circumstances require, until the constitution of the kingdom is established and consolidated upon solid foundations." Failing to disperse the delegates, Louis started to recognise their validity on 27 June.

The Assembly renamed itself the National Constituent Assembly on 9 July and began to function as a governing body and a constitution-drafter. However, it is common to refer to the body even after then as the "National Assembly" or the "Constituent Assembly".

== Structure in summer 1789 ==
Nous sommes donc trois written by Chevalier de Saint-Georges (1790)

Following the storming of the Bastille on 14 July, the National Constituent Assembly became the effective government of France. In the words of historian François Mignet:

The assembly had acquired the entire power; the corporations depended on it; the national guards obeyed it... the royal power, though existing of right, was in a measure suspended, since it was not obeyed, and the assembly had to supply its action by its own.

The number of the Estates-General increased significantly during the election period, but many deputies took their time arriving, some of them reaching Paris as late as 1791. According to Timothy Tackett, there were a total of 1,177 deputies in the Assembly by mid-July 1789. Among them, 278 belonged to the nobility, 295 to the clergy, and 604 were representatives of the Third Estate. For the entire duration of the Assembly, a total of 1,315 deputies were certified: 330 clerics, 322 nobles, and 663 deputies of the Third Estate. Tackett noted that the majority of the Second Estate had a military background, and the Third Estate was dominated by men of legal professions.

Some of the leading figures of the Assembly at this time were:

- The conservative foes of the revolution, later known as "The Right":
  - Jacques Antoine Marie de Cazalès – a forthright spokesman for aristocracy
  - the abbé Jean-Sifrein Maury – a somewhat inflexible representative of the Church
- The Monarchiens ("Monarchists", also called "Democratic Royalists") allied with Jacques Necker, inclined toward arranging France along lines similar to the British constitution model with a House of Lords and a House of Commons:
  - Pierre Victor, baron Malouet
  - Trophime-Gérard, marquis de Lally-Tollendal
  - Stanislas Marie Adelaide, comte de Clermont-Tonnerre
  - Jean Joseph Mounier
- "The Left" (also called "National Party") was still relatively united in support of revolution and democracy, representing mainly the interests of the middle classes but strongly sympathetic to the broader range of the common people. In the early period, its most notable leaders included Honoré Mirabeau, the Marquis de Lafayette, and Jean-Sylvain Bailly (the first two of aristocratic background). Mignet also points to Adrien Duport, Antoine Pierre Joseph Marie Barnave, and Alexander Lameth as leaders among the "most extreme of this party" in this period, leaders in taking "a more advanced position than that which the revolution had [at this time] attained." Lameth's brother Charles also belonged to this group.
- Patriotic Society of 1789

One must add the role played by the Abbé Emmanuel Joseph Sieyès, especially in regard to the proposition of legislation in this period, as the man who, for a time, managed to bridge the differences between those who wanted a constitutional monarchy and those who wished to move towards more democratic, even republican directions.

== Restoration of king ==
In the summer of 1791, the National Constituent Assembly decided that the king needed to be restored to the throne if he accepted the constitution. The decision was made after the king's failed flight to Varennes. That decision enraged many Parisians into protesting, and one major protest devolved into the Champ de Mars Massacre, with 12 to 50 people killed by the National Guard.

== Dissolution ==
After surviving the vicissitudes of a revolutionary two years, the National Constituent Assembly dissolved itself on 30 September 1791. The following day, the Constitution of 1791 went into effect, which granted power to the Legislative Assembly.

== See also ==
- French Revolution from the abolition of feudalism to the Civil Constitution of the Clergy
- French Revolution from the summer of 1790 to the establishment of the Legislative Assembly
- List of presidents of the National Assembly of France.
- Alphabetical list of members of the National Constituent Assembly of 1789.
