= Adrien Duport =

French politician and lawyer

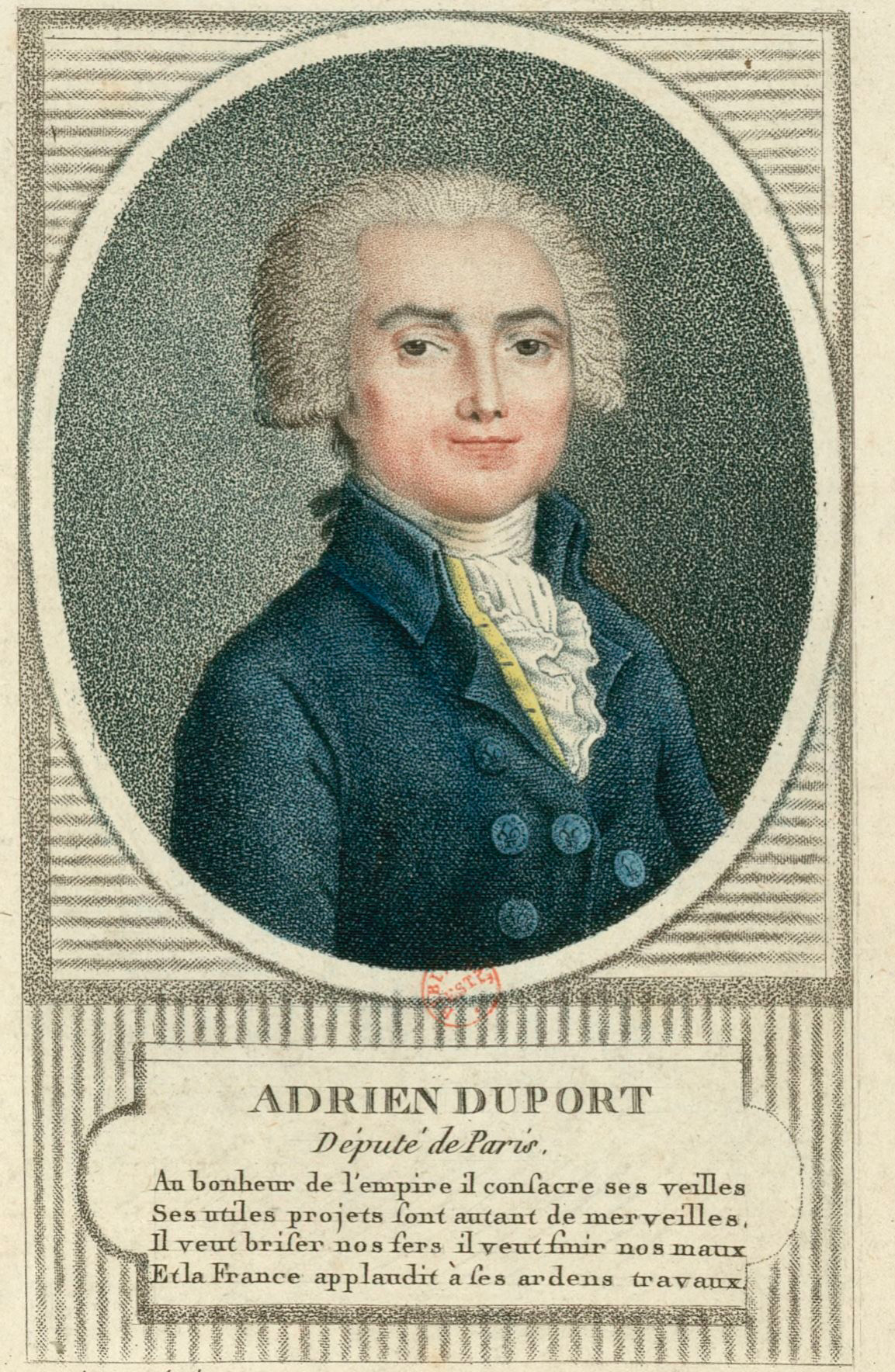
Adrien Duport

Adrien Duport (French pronunciation: [adʁijɛ̃ dypɔʁ]; 6 February 1759 – 6 July 1798) was a French politician, and lawyer. He was an influential advocate in the parlement, and was prominent in opposition to the ministers Calonne and Loménie de Brienne.

== Life ==
Adrien Jean-François Duport was born in Paris.

Elected in 1789, to the states-general by the Paris nobility, he displayed remarkable eloquence. As a jurist, he contributed during the Constituent Assembly to the organization of the judiciary of France. In his report of March 29, 1790, he advocated trial by jury; but failed to introduce the jury system in civil cases.

Duport formed with Barnave and Alexandre de Lameth a group known as the "triumvirate," which was popular at first. But after the flight of King Louis XVI to Varennes, Duport tried to defend him; as member of the commission charged to question the king, he found excuses, and on July 14, 1791, he opposed the formal accusation. Having separated himself from the Jacobins, he joined the Feuillant party. After the Constituent Assembly, he became president of the criminal tribunal of Paris, but was arrested by Danton during the insurrection of 10 August 1792. He escaped, thanks to evidence provided by Jean-Paul Marat, and fled to Switzerland. He returned to France after the 9th of Thermidor of the year II (27 July 1794), and left it in exile again after the republican coup d'état of 18 Fructidor of the year V (4 September 1797).

In 1798, Duport died from tuberculosis in Appenzell, Switzerland.

== Sources ==
- F.A. Aulard, Les Orateurs de la Constituante (2nd ed., Paris, 1905, 8vo).
