= Guillaume Kornmann =

French banker

Guillaume Kornmann (born 1741, Strasbourg; died 1795, Paris) was a French banker. He is best known for the particularly sensational trial of his wife (prosecuted by Beaumarchais) in the 1780s.

In 1774, Kornmann married Catherine Marie Foesch, a young Swiss heiress, who bore him two children. They settled in Paris, where he managed his uncle's bank. The couple did not get on well, and Kornmann allowed his wife to take a lover, as long as she kept things in order. The lover was Daudet de Jossan, a confidant of the powerful de Montbarey, Minister for War and magistrate for Strasbourg. But soon, the minister resigned, and the young man suddenly became much less respectable. Furthermore, Madame Kornmann, who did not hesitate to be seen with him in a scandalous way, threatened to demand a separation from her husband (as divorce did not yet exist). Fearing he would lose his wife and particularly her dowry, Guillaume Kornmann, who in the meantime was almost ruined, obtained a warrant from the police commissioner and had his adulterous wife arrested, then pregnant by her lover.

Thus, on the night of 3–4 August 1781, his wife was taken to Douai, a disciplinary institution on the Rue de Bellefond that housed "lost" and mad women. On the insistence of mutual friends, Beaumarchais rescued Madame Kornmann (whom he did not yet know). Thus began the Kornmann Affair. Once freed, she tried unsuccessfully to obtain a legal separation from her husband, arguing that her scandalous detention justified it.

The cheated husband decided to press charges against his spouse and her lover for adultery, against Beaumarchais and Police Commissioner Lenoir for defamation and as accessories to adultery. He took his friend Nicolas Bergasse, a fellow disciple of Anton Mesmer, as his lawyer.

Beaumarchais was declared innocent by order of the Parlement of Paris the 2 April 1789. Kornmann and his lawyer Bergasse were ordered to pay him damages but public opinion remained largely in their favour. In 1793 Madame Kornmann finally obtained a divorce, which had been permitted by the law of 20 September 1792.
