= Nicolas Bergasse =

French lawyer, philosopher and politician (1750–1832)

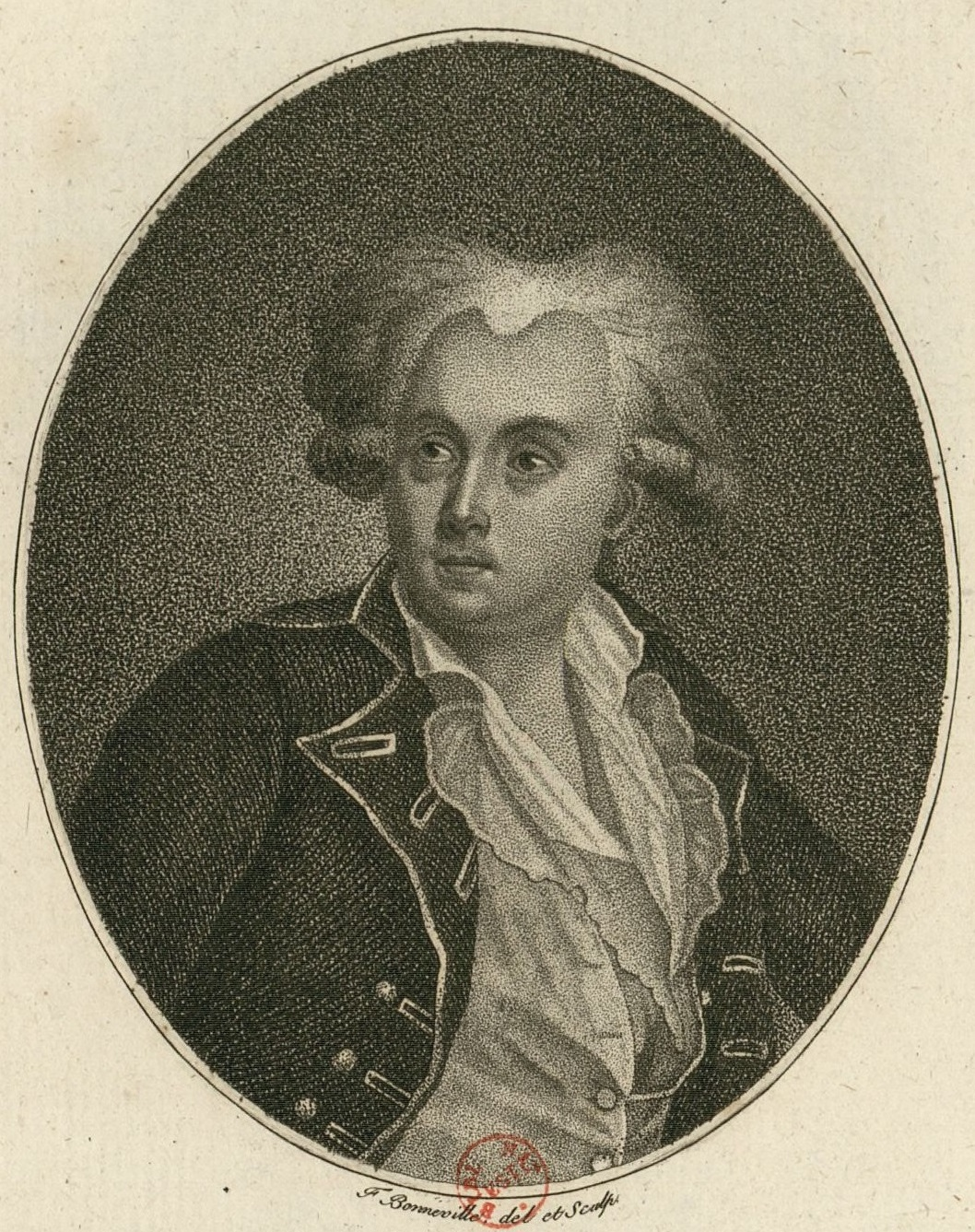
- Born: 24 January 1750; Lyon
- Died: 28 May 1832 (aged 82); Paris
- Known for: Political activity during Revolution, Animal magnetism

Nicolas Bergasse (French pronunciation: [nikɔla bɛʁɡas]; born 24 January 1750 in Lyon – died 28 May 1832 in Paris) was a French lawyer, philosopher, and politician, whose activity was mainly carried out during the beginning of the French Revolution during its early Monarchiens phase.

== Life ==
After studying philosophy and law, Bergasse became a lawyer at the Parlement of Paris. He was very interested in the Enlightenment and in particular meeting Sieyès and Jean-Jacques Rousseau. In 1781, he became a disciple of Franz Mesmer, and published in 1784 a systemization of Mesmerism titled Considérations sur le magnetisme animal. In the Kornmann case, his quarrel with Beaumarchais made him a famous personality.

In 1789, he was elected Deputy of the Estates-General and become an important face of the Monarchiens Party. During the French Revolution, he created a particular political and constitutional thought inspired by the British and American models and develops a theory of the sovereignty of universal reason. He delivered an important report to the National Assembly on the organization of justice. He survived the Reign of Terror, but stopped active policy.

During the Bourbon Restoration, he published Essay on the law and Essay on the Property, as a result of which he ran into problems with the authorities. He died in Paris in 1832, aged 82.

== Works ==
Publications about the Animal Magnetism of Franz Mesmer:

- Considérations sur le magnétisme animal, ou Sur la théorie du monde et des êtres organisés, d'après les principes de M. Mesmer - 1784
- Théorie du Monde suivant les principes de Mesmer

Publications about the Kornmann case (1786-1789):

- Mémoire sur une question d'adultère, de séduction et de diffamation, pour le sieur Kornmann contre la dame Kornmann, son épouse, le sieur Daudet de Jossan, le sieur Pierre-Augustin Caron de Beaumarchais et M. Le Noir, Conseiller d’État, ancien lieutenant de Police suivi de Pièces Justificatives – 1787
- Observations de M. Kornmann sur un écrit de M. de Beaumarchais – 1787
- Note de M. Kornmann relative à son procès contre Beaumarchais – 1787
- Observations du sieur Kornmann en réponse au mémoire de M. Lenoir – 1787
- Nouvelles Observations pour le sieur Kornmann contre M. Lenoir – 1787
- Observations du Sieur Kornmann sur une lettre du Sieur Daudet, à l'imprimeur Muller – 1787
- Mémoire du sieur Kornmann en réponse au mémoire du sieur de Beaumarchais – 1787
- Observation du Sieur Kornmann sur un Ecrit signé Séguin et Dubois (suivi de Réponses des Propriétaires Associés dans l’acquisition des Quinze-Vingts aux Réflexions du Sieur Kornmann) – 1787
- Discours sur l’humanité des juges dans l’administration de la justice criminelle – 1787.
- Réflexions préliminaires dans la cause du sieur Bergasse avec le prince de Nassau – 1788
- Observations du sieur Bergasse, sur l'écrit du sieur de Beaumarchais, ayant pour titre : « Court mémoire, en attendant l'autre », dans la cause du sieur Kornmann – 1788
- Précis pour le sieur Kornmann contre le sieur Le Page, docteur en médecine – 1788
- Considérations sur la liberté du commerce. Ouvrage où l'on examine s'il est avantageux ou nuisible au Commerce que le transport des denrées et des Marchandises soit réduit en un privilège exclusif, Londres, 1788.
- Observations du sieur Bergasse, dans la cause du sieur Kornmann – 1789
- Plaidoyer prononcé à la Tournelle-criminelle, le jeudi 19 mars 1789, par le sieur Bergasse, dans la cause du sieur Kornmann– 1789

Publications during the French Revolution and the Bourbon Restoration:

- many Discours and Rapports pronounced in the National Assembly;
- Réflexions de M. Bergasse, ancien député à l'Assemblée Constituante, sur l'acte constitutionnel du Sénat (1814)
- Protestation contre les Assignats-Monnoie (1790)
- Essai sur la loi, la souveraineté et la liberté de la presse (1817)
- Essai sur la propriété (1821)

Other publications

- Discours [sur cette question: Quelles sont les causes générales des progrès de l'industrie et du commerce, et quelle a été leur influence sur l'esprit et les moeurs des nations?] prononcé a l'Hôtel de Ville de Lyon, le 21 décember 1774 (1775)
- Considérations sur la liberté du commerce; ouvrage où l'on examine, s'il est avantageux ou nuisible au commerce de réduire en privilege exclusif le transport des denrées & des marchandises (1780)
- Lettre d'un médecin de la faculté de Paris, a un médecin du college de Londres; : ouvrage dans lequel on prouve contre M. Mesmer, que le magnétisme animal n'existe pas (1781)

== Bibliography ==
- Thérence Carvalho, « Nicolas Bergasse et la souveraineté de la raison universelle », Journal of Interdisciplinary History of Ideas, 2013, vol. 2, n° 1, pp. 1–23 (http://www.ojs.unito.it/index.php/jihi/issue/current/showToc).
- Robert Darnton, Mesmerism and the End of the Enlightenment in France, Cambridge, Harvard University Press, 1995.
- Jean-Denis Bergasse, D’un rêve de réformation à une considération européenne : MM. les députés Bergasse (XVIIIe – XIXe siècles), édité par l’auteur, 1990.
- Louis Bergasse, Un philosophe lyonnais : Nicolas Bergasse, Essai de philosophie chrétienne sous le premier empire, Librairie philosophique J. Vrin, Paris, 1938.
- Louis Bergasse, Un défenseur des principes traditionnels sous la révolution : Nicolas Bergasse, avocat au parlement de paris, député du tiers état de la sénéchaussée Lyon 1750-1832, Librairie Académique Perrin, Paris, 1910.
- René Martineau, Un avocat du temps jadis, Nicolas Bergasse, Ducourtieux et Gout, Limoges, 1907.
- Léopold de Gaillard, Autres temps : Nicolas Bergasse, député de Lyon à l’Assemblée constituante; deux enclaves de l’ancienne France : Orange et Avignon, Librairie Plon, Paris, 1893.
