= Château d'Hénencourt =

17th-century country house in France

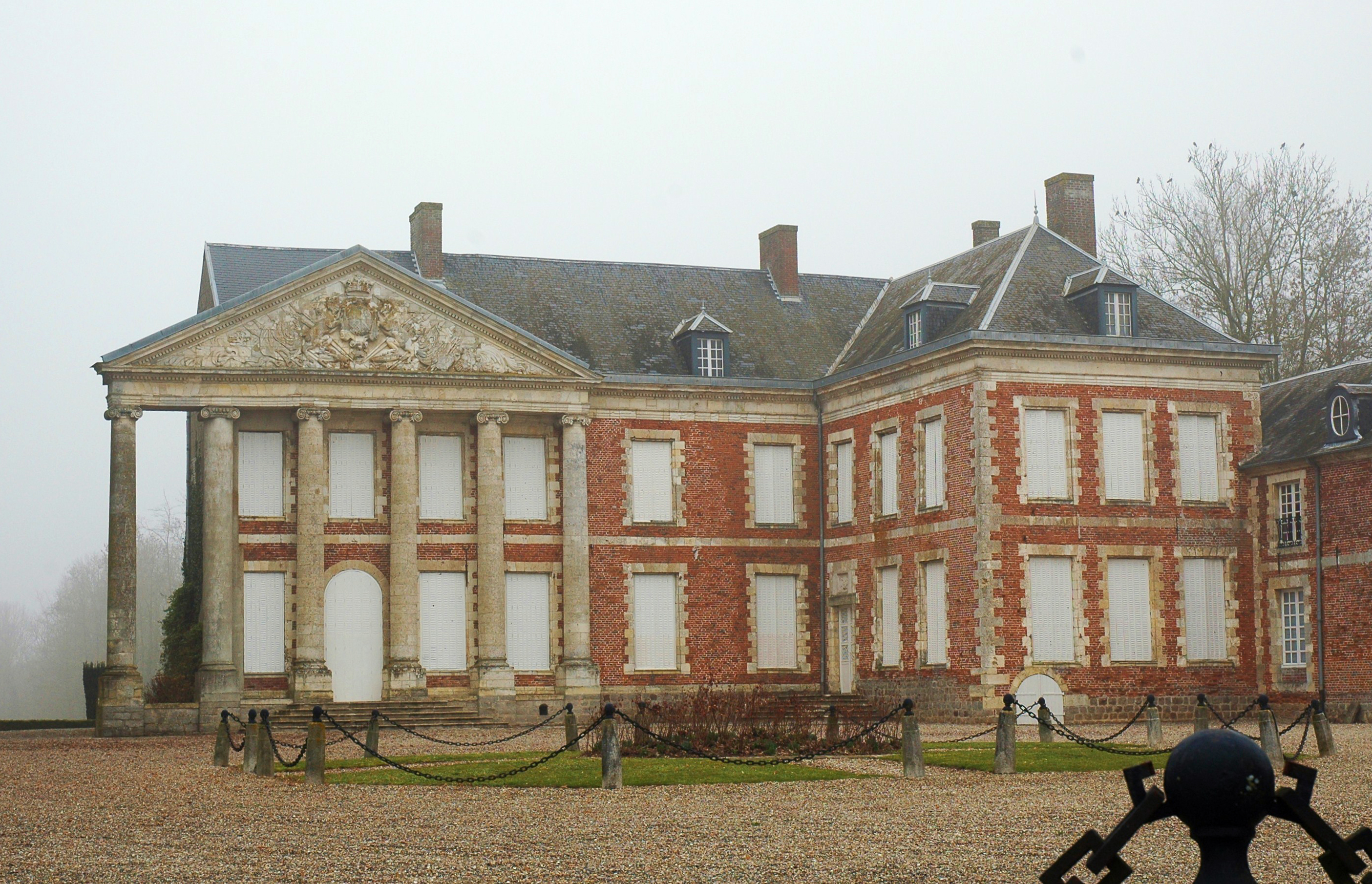
- Interactive map of the Château d'Hénencourt area

General information
- Coordinates: 50°00′17″N 2°33′46″E

The Château d'Hénencourt is an historic country house in Hénencourt, Somme, Hauts-de-France, France.

== History ==
The château was built in the 17th century. It was owned by Count Charles Malo François Lameth.

During World War I, Sir William Birdwood, 1st Baron Birdwood, and Australian soldiers were stationed at the château. It was partly bombed by the German invaders in 1918. The left wing of the château was left in ruins, but the rest of it was made habitable. During World War I, the Comtesse de Hénencourt took care of the estate and all of the soldiers that stayed there.

== Architectural significance ==
It has been listed as an official historical monument by the French Ministry of Culture since 1984. It is now a private residence belonging to Hénencourt descendants.
