= Jean Joseph Mounier =

French politician and judge (1758–1806)

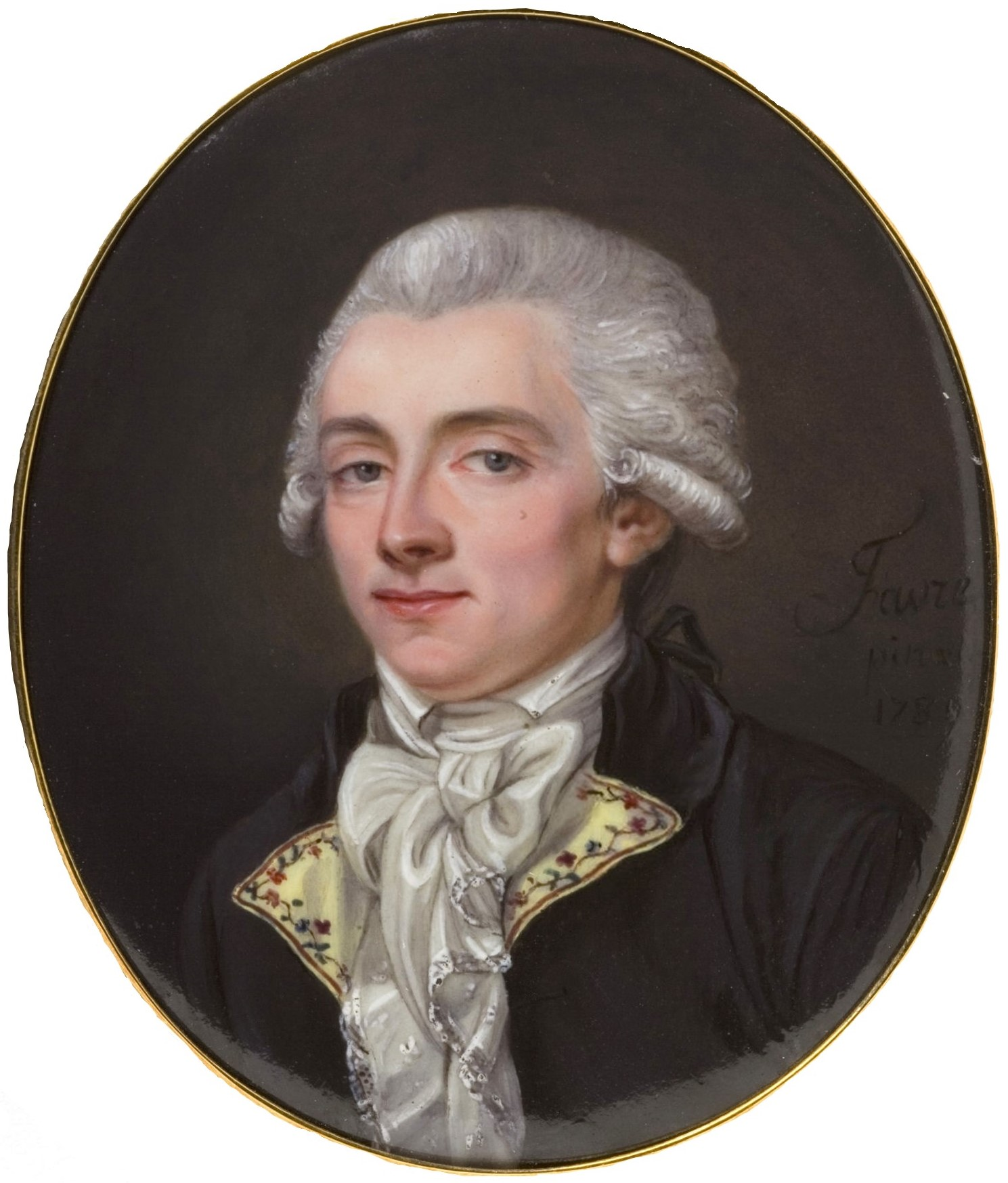
Jean Joseph Mounier

Jean Joseph Mounier (French pronunciation: [ʒɑ̃ ʒozɛf munje]; 12 November 1758 – 28 January 1806) was a French politician and judge.

== Biography ==
Mounier was born the son of a cloth merchant in Grenoble in Southeastern France. He studied law, and in 1782 purchased a minor judgeship at Grenoble. He took part in the struggle between the parlements and the court in 1788, and promoted the meeting of the estates of Dauphiné at Vizille (20 July 1788), on the eve of the French Revolution. He was secretary of the assembly, and drafted the cahiers ("notebooks") of grievances and remonstrances presented by it to King Louis XVI. Thus brought into prominence, Mounier was unanimously elected deputy of the third estate to the Estates General of 1789; Mounier also founded the Monarchiens party in August 1789.

There, and in the Constituent Assembly, he was at first an upholder of the new ideas, pronouncing himself in favor of the union of the Third Estate with the two privileged orders, proposing the famous Tennis Court Oath, assisting in the preparation of the new constitution, and demanding the return of Jacques Necker. After the Estates General became the National Assembly, Mounier was elected to the committee on the constitution. Despite his skepticism of the abstract declaration of rights and his belief that such a declaration should be accompanied by a written constitution, Mounier was the principal author of the first three articles of the Declaration of the Rights of Man and of the Citizen, adopted on 6 August. On 28 September 1789 he was elected president of the Constituent Assembly. Being unable to approve the proceedings which followed, Mounier withdrew to Dauphiné, resigned as deputy, and, becoming suspect, took refuge in Switzerland in 1790.

He returned to France in 1801. Napoleon Bonaparte named him prefect of the department of Ille-et-Vilaine, which he reorganized, and in 1805, he was appointed councillor of state. He died in Paris. His principal writings are Considérations sur les gouvernements (1789); Recherches sur les causes qui ont empeché les Français de devenir libres (1792), and De l'influence attribuée aux philosophes, aux francs-maçons et aux illuminés sur la Révolution Française. (1801).

== Works ==
- Projet des premiers articles de la Constitution (1789)
- Déclaration des droits de l'homme et du citoyen (1789)
- Nouvelles observations sur les États-Généraux de France (1789)
- Rapport de M. Mounier (1789)
- Exposé de la conduite de M. Mounier, dans l'Assemblée nationale, et des motifs de son retour en Dauphiné (1789)
- Considérations sur les gouvernements, et principalement sur celui qui convient a la France. (1789)
- Lettre écrite à la municipalité & au comité du bourg de Veynes (1789)
- Rapport du comité chargé du travail sur la constitution (9 juli 1789)
- Aux Dauphinois (1790)
- Appel au tribunal de l'opinion publique du rapport de M. Chabroud, et du décret rendu par l'Assemblée nationale le 2 octobre 1790. Examen du mémoire du duc d'Orléans, et du plaidoyer du comte de Mirabeau, et nouveaux ecclaircissemens sur les crimes du 5 et du 6 octobre 1789 (1790)
- Réflexions politiques sur les circonstances présentes (1790)
- Observations sur l'état passé, présent et futur de la nation, et de l'influence du publiciste Mably sur la Révolution (1791)
- Recherches sur les causes qui ont empêché les Français de devenir libres, et sur les moyens qui leur restent pur aquiérir la liberté. Tome premier; Tome second. Genève (1792)
- Adolphe, ou principes élémentaires de politique, et résultats de la plus cruelle des expériences (1795)
- De l'influence attribuee aux philosophes, aux francs-masons et aux illumines sur la revolution de la France. Tübingen (1801)
