= Hénencourt =

- Commune
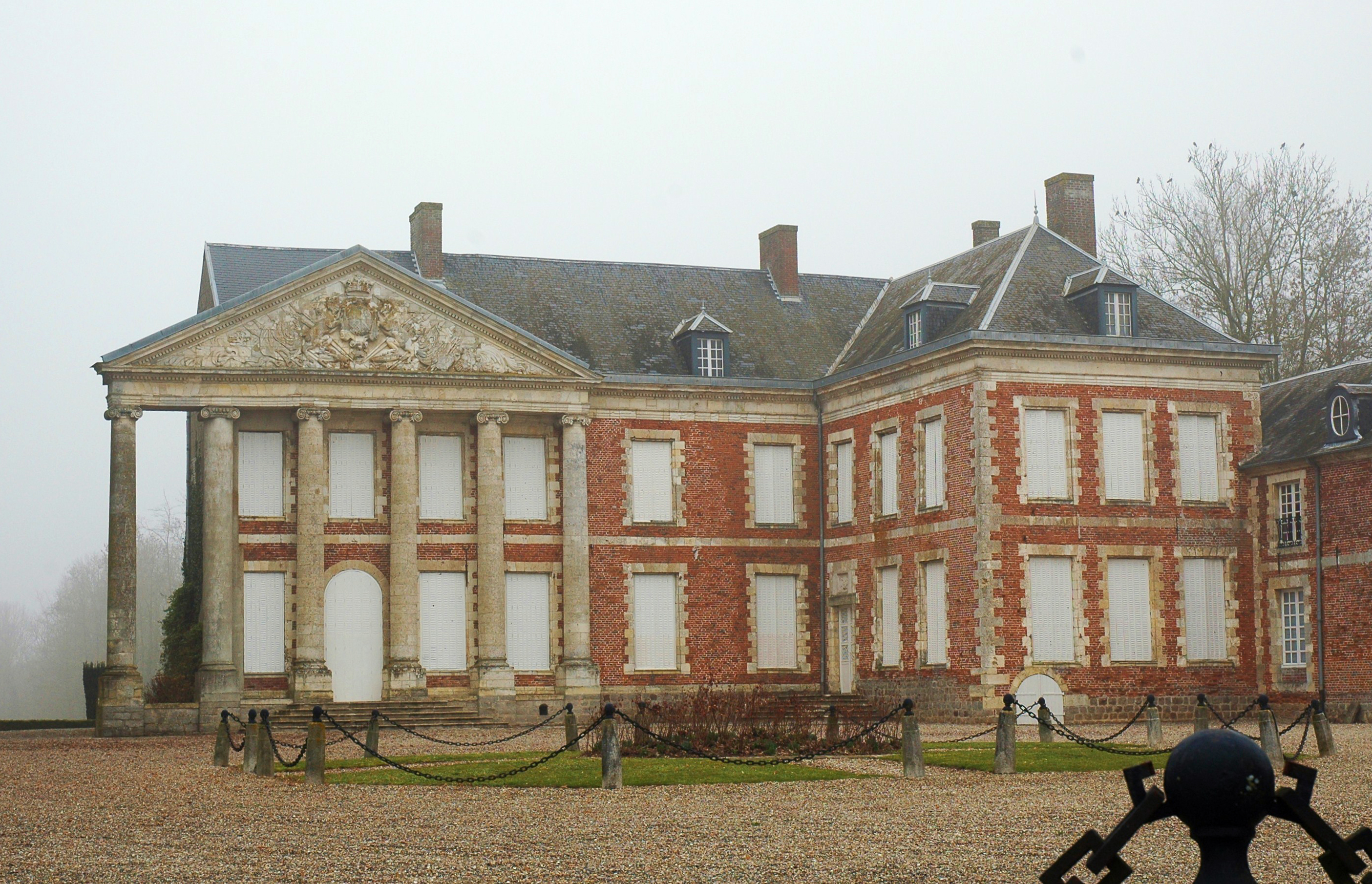
- The Château d'Hénencourt

- Coat of arms
- Location of Hénencourt
- Location within France Location within Hauts-de-France
- Coordinates: 50°00′10″N 2°33′50″E
- Country: France
- Region: Hauts-de-France
- Department: Somme
- Arrondissement: Amiens
- Canton: Corbie
- Intercommunality: Val de Somme

Government
  - Mayor (2020–2026): Gilles Roussel
- Area^{1}: 3.26 km^{2} (1.26 sq mi)
- Elevation: 90 m (300 ft)
- Highest elevation: 121 m (397 ft)
- Lowest elevation: 83 m (272 ft)
- Population (2023): 194
  - Density: 59.5/km^{2} (154/sq mi)
- Time zone: UTC+01:00 (CET)
  - Summer (DST): UTC+02:00 (CEST)
- INSEE/Postal code: 80429 /80300
- ^{1} French Land Register data, which excludes lakes, ponds, glaciers > 1 km^{2} (0.386 sq mi or 247 acres) and river estuaries.

Hénencourt (French pronunciation: [enɑ̃kuʁ]; Picard: Hinincourt) is a commune in the Somme department in Hauts-de-France in northern France.

== Geography ==
The commune is situated at the junction of the D91 and the D119 roads, some 15 miles (24 km) northeast of Amiens.

== Population ==
Historical population
Year	Pop.	±% p.a.
1968	174	—
1975	176	+0.16%
1982	165	−0.92%
1990	205	+2.75%
1999	193	−0.67%
2007	177	−1.08%
2012	192	+1.64%
2017	195	+0.31%
2023	194	−0.09%
Source: INSEE

== See also ==
- Communes of the Somme department
