= Alexandre-Théodore-Victor, comte de Lameth =

French soldier and politician (1760–1829)

Alexandre-Théodore-Victor Lameth
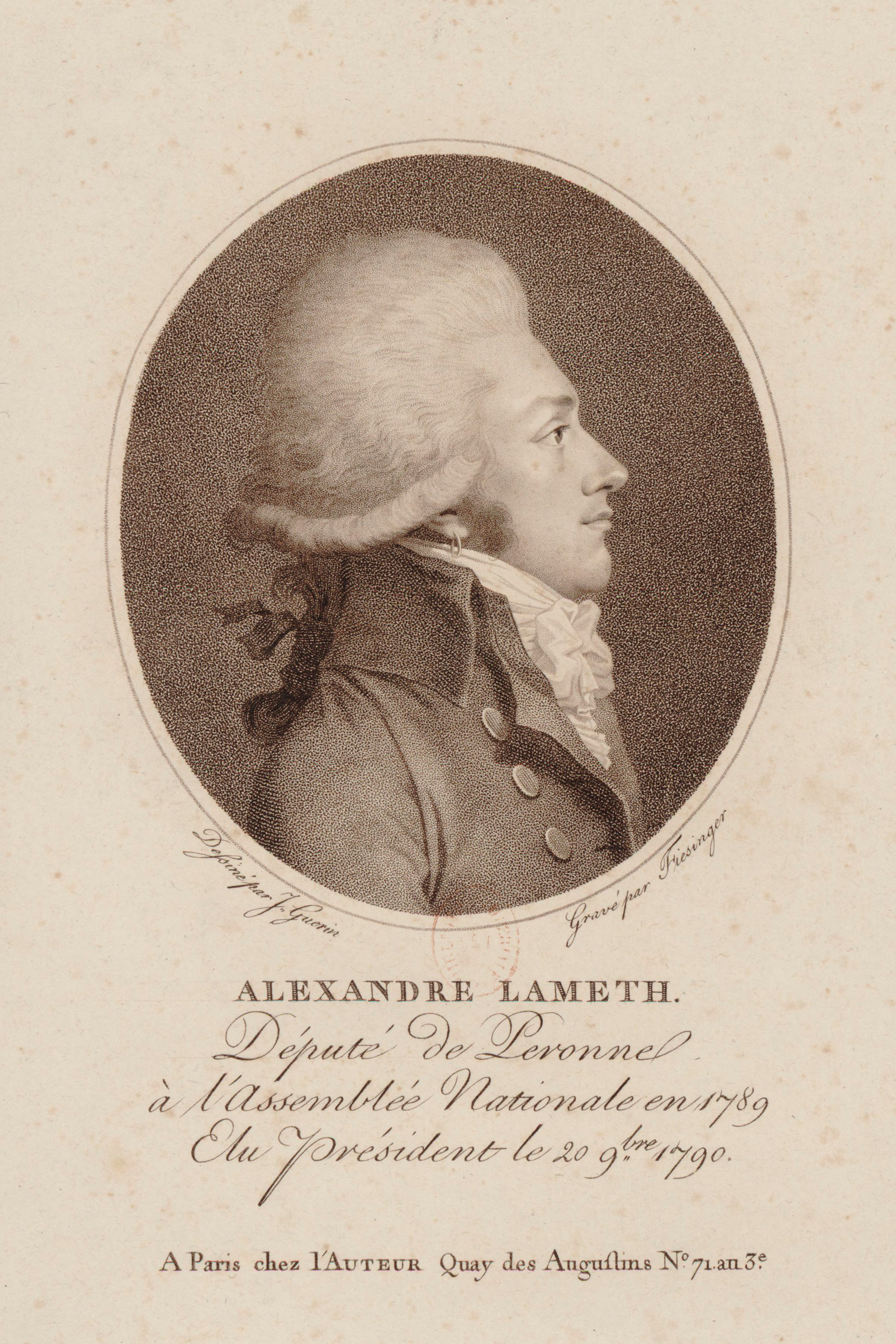
- Born: 20 October 1760; Paris, France
- Died: 18 March 1829 (aged 68)
- Title: Count
- Relatives: Charles Malo François Lameth (brother); Théodore de Lameth (brother)

Alexandre-Théodore-Victor, comte de Lameth (French: [alɛksɑ̃dʁ teodɔʁ viktɔʁ lamɛt]; 20 October 1760 – 18 March 1829) was a French soldier and politician.

== Life ==
Alexandre Lameth was born in Paris on 20 October 1760 and was the youngest child of Marie Thérèse de Broglie. His mother was the sister of the Maréchal de Broglie and a favourite of Marie Antoinette. His other two brothers were, Théodore Lameth (1756–1854), who served in the American war, sat in the Legislative Assembly as deputy from the department of Jura, and became maréchal-de-camp; and Charles Malo François Lameth, who was a popular politician and a hero of the American War of Independence. He served in the American War of Independence as a colonel in the Royal Lorraine Regiment under Rochambeau. He was also a Knight of the Order of Malta like his brother Charles Lameth. Like many other veterans from the American War of Independence, and those among the French Patriot Party, Lameth became friends with Thomas Jefferson. His commitment to moderate constitutional and social reform gathered him respect in the eyes of Jefferson, given his idea for a unicameral, influential legislature. Several American newspapers would publish his speeches of what took place during the National Assembly, and his stances on private property, the Civil Constitution of the Clergy, etc. Alexandre-Théodore-Victor was a member of the Society of the Cincinnati from France.

Alexandre Lameth, Adrien Duport, and Barnave were brought together in September 1789 for the first time during the first struggles of the Patriot Party. Despite the odds against them, their political ties strengthened and became a profound friendship that lasted through the turmoil. In the Constituent Assembly they formed a "Triumvirate", which controlled a group of about forty deputies forming the advanced left of the Assembly. He presented a famous report in the Constituent Assembly on the organization of the army, but is better known by his eloquent speech on 28 February 1791, at the Jacobin Club, against Honoré Mirabeau, whose relations with the court were beginning to be suspected, and who was a personal enemy of Lameth. During the next months, as leaders of the Feuillant club, they established their belief that the flight of the King to Varennes was all because of the faulty revolutionary process that prohibited any manner of compromise. They intended to rule out both the Republicans and Democrats, so there would be as much compromise as possible. Their main intention was to end the war as soon as possible while still maintaining the gains of the revolution by passing the Constitution. Their hopes for moderate reform were sullied by the radical turn of the Revolution.

He served in the army as maréchal-de-camp under Nicolas Luckner and the Marquis de la Fayette, but was accused of treason on 12 August 1792 for protesting against the Attack on the Tuileries. Once he fled the country, Lameth as well as Gilbert du Motier, Marquis de Lafayette, Bureaux de Pusy, and Latour-Maubourg, former members of the Constituent Assembly, were captured by Austrians. They were held in dungeons for seven years.

After his release, he went into business at Hamburg with his brother Charles and the duc d'Aiguillon, and did not return to France until the Consulate. Under the Empire, he was made prefect successively in several departments, and in 1810 was declared a Baron of the Empire. In 1814, he attached himself to the Bourbons, and under the Restoration was appointed prefect of Somme, deputy for Seine-Inférieure and finally deputy for Seine-et-Oise, in which capacity he was a leader of the Liberal opposition.

He wrote various novels and articles, his two most prominent being: Histoire de l'Assemblée constituante and Mémoires publiés avec introduction et notes par Eugène Welvert. In Histoire de l'Assemblée constituante, he introduced this work by displaying how he did not wish to write a book of biased anecdotes, nor provide a side of the revolution that states he was a main player, even though he was in a position to recall the most prominent events. He wanted to present an accurate, detailed description of the work of the Constituent Assembly.

== Bibliography ==
- 1789 - Opinion du chevalier Alexandre de La Meth, a la séance du samedi 8 août 1789, dans l'Assemblée nationale
- 1790 - Opinion de M. Alexandre de Lameth, député de Pérone, sur la constitution militaire. Prononcé à la séance du 9 février 1790
- 1790 - Décrets rendus sur l'admission et l'avancement militaire; Précédés du rapport fait à l'Assemblée nationale, au nom du Comité militaire
- 1790 - Louis XIV au Manège. Dialogue entre Louis XIV, Alexandre Lameth, D'Eprémesnil, Mirabeau, Barnave
- 1790 - La résurrection du collier, par M. Lameth et compagnie
- 1791 - Rapport fait à l'Assemblée nationale, au nom des Comités militaire et diplomatique
- 1824 - Un Electeur à ses collègues
- 1828 - Histoire de l'Assemblée constituante. Tome premier
