= Jacques Antoine Marie de Cazalès =

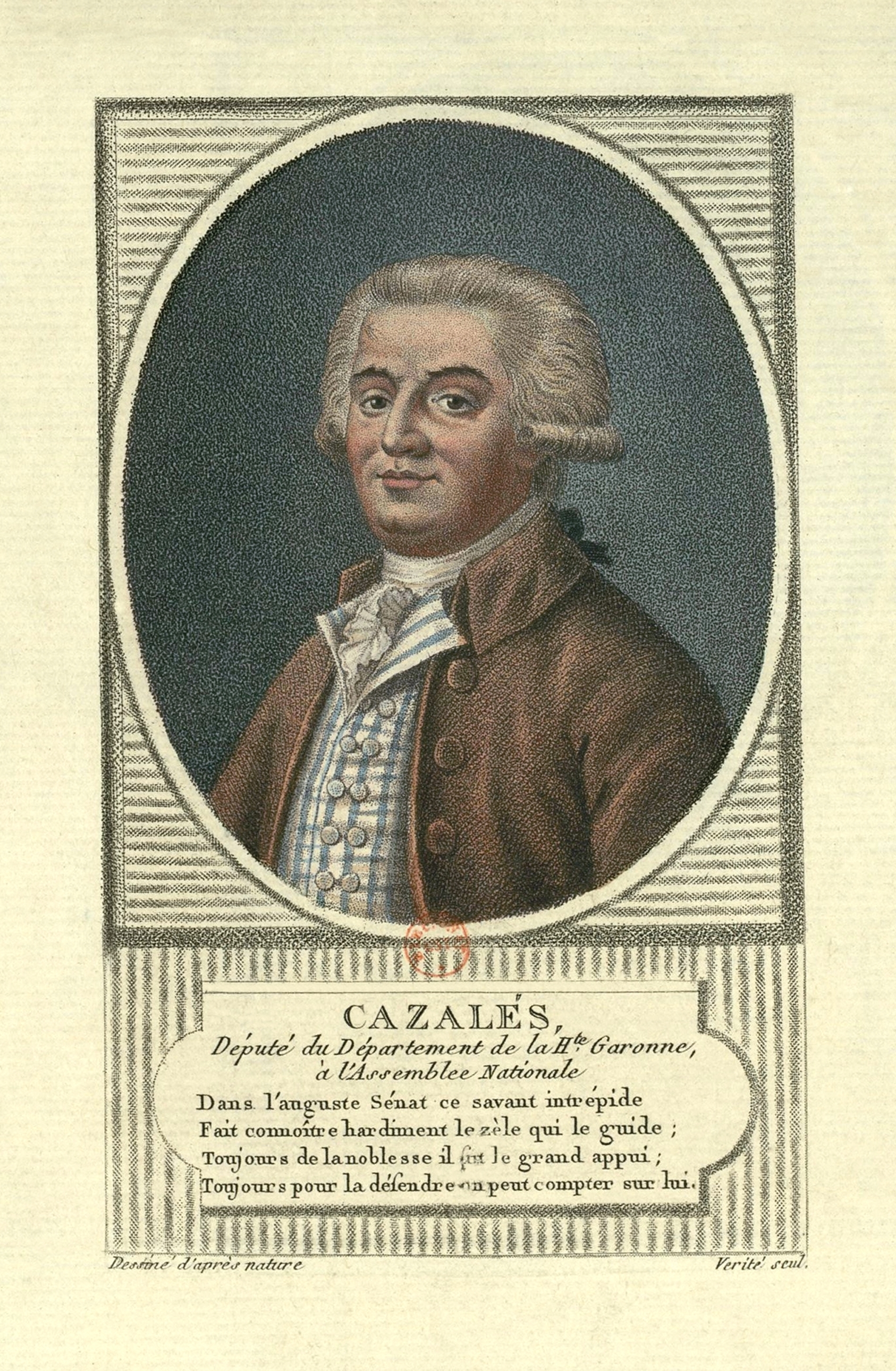
Jacques Antoine Marie de Cazalès

Jacques Antoine Marie de Cazalès (February 1, 1758 – November 24, 1805) was a French orator and politician. De Cazalès was born at Grenade, Haute-Garonne to a family of the lower nobility. With his father as an adviser to the parliament of Toulouse, Cazalès undertook a career in the military, becoming captain of the dragoons at the age of 21.

In this political career, Cazalès proved to be a devout representative of the right, becoming the elected deputy of the nobility for the Verdun countries. His rightist ideals and orations made him political enemies, such as Barnarve, who scarred Cazalès in a duel. As a moderate conservative, Cazalès favored an intermediate system of government, between absolute and constitutional monarchy. It is not surprising that he was thus close to Edmund Burke, who held similar views, and served as a source of information and intelligence to British leaders during the French Revolution. Cazalès also tried to found a conservative-liberal party, along with Mirabeau. His son, Edmond de Cazalès (fr), wrote philosophical and religious studies.

== Early life ==
Cazalès was born at Grenade, Haute-Garonne, in a family of the lower nobility. Cazalès was not very educated as a young man. His father, mostly concerned with his duties to parliament, had little time to secure Cazalès' education. With his studies suspended at twelve, the young Cazalès turned to a career in the military, and at fifteen years old, entered in a regiment of dragoons. He made an honest name for himself and by the age of 21, he would become a captain. Cazalès wanted to pursue a career outside of the military and so sought an education. He taught himself through the works of historians and publicists. With a special interest in law, he studied the history of English government. His fascination in government brought him to Montesquieu's school, where he studied the principles of government, liberty, and the separation of powers within government.

== Political career ==
In his early political life, Cazalès was imprisoned for his efforts against Parlement Maupeou. In the Constituent Assembly he belonged to the section of moderate royalists who sought to set up a constitution on the British model, and his speeches in favour of retaining the right of war and peace in the king's hands and on the organization of the judiciary gained the applause even of his opponents. Although he left few records of his speeches or his personal life, his political beliefs and ideologies were published in journals like the Moniteur.

Among Cazalès' beliefs was the belief that men were not equal and maintained the difference between active and passive citizens. He did not find it necessary to grant equality to slaves nor to women. One of his more prominent positions was that of private property, which he fought vigorously to protect in the Constituent Assembly, feeling that it is a "sacred and inviolable right". Apart from his eloquence, which gave him a place among the finest orators of the Assembly, Cazalès is mainly remembered for a duel fought with Barnave, in which Cazalès was wounded in the forehead. After the insurrection of August 10, 1792, which led to the downfall of royalty, Cazalès emigrated. He fought in the army of the émigrés against revolutionary France. He later urged the convention the privilege of defending Louis XVI before the court, publishing a remarkable argument in his defense. Back in France in 1803, he lived with little public presence until his death in 1805.
