= Champ de Mars massacre =

1791 massacre in Paris

Coordinates: 48°51′22″N 2°17′54″E

- Part of French Revolution
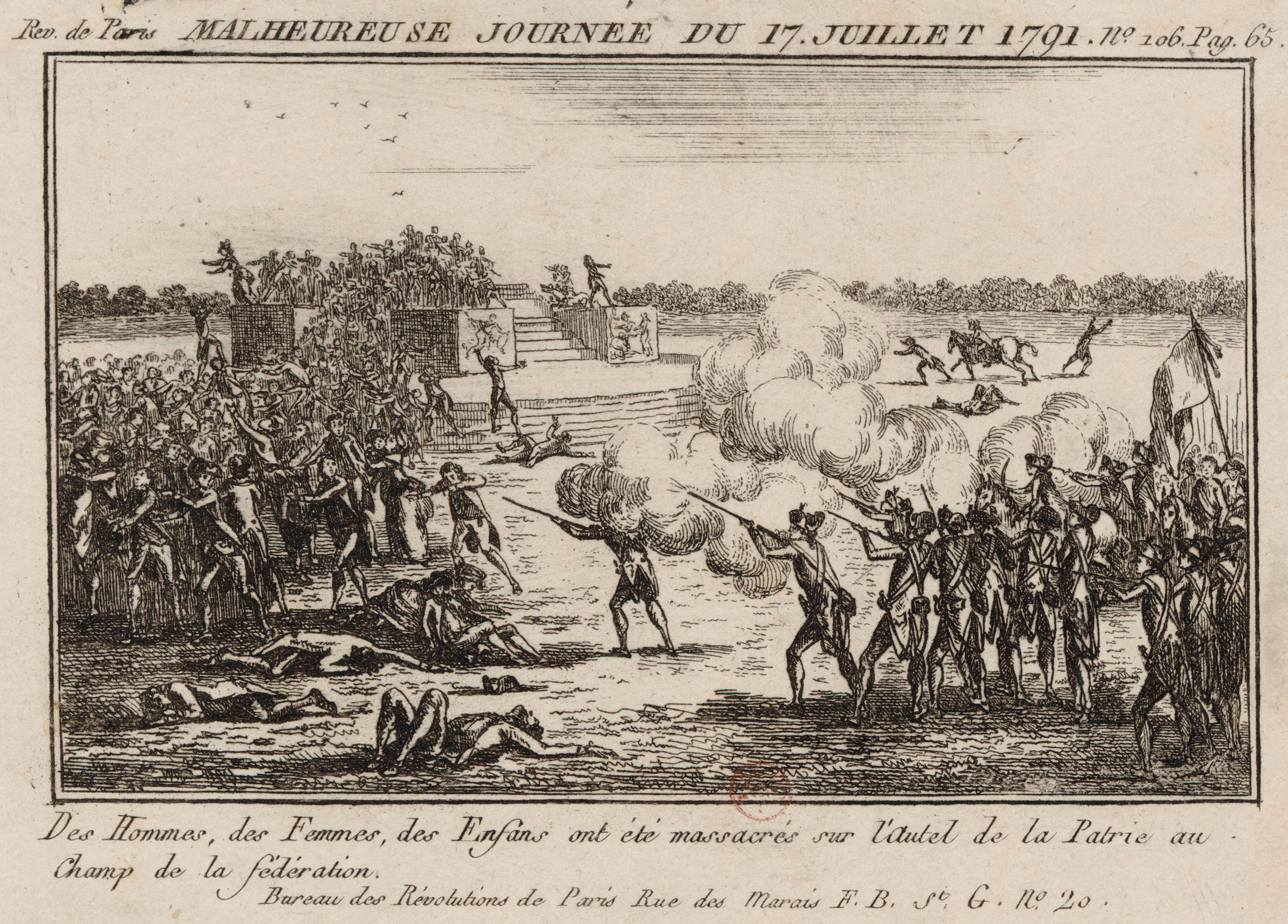
- Contemporary print by an anonymous artist. The caption reads "Men, Women, Children were massacred on the altar of the fatherland at the Champ de la Fédération"
- Date: 17 July 1791
- Location: Champ-de-Mars, Paris, France

Parties
Republican crowd	National Guard

Lead figures
Georges Danton; Camille Desmoulins	Marquis de Lafayette; Jean Sylvain Bailly

Casualties
- Deaths: 12–50
- Location within present-day Paris, France

The Champ de Mars massacre took place on 17 July 1791 in Paris at the Champ de Mars against a crowd of republican protesters amid the French Revolution. Two days before, the National Constituent Assembly issued a decree that King Louis XVI would retain his throne under a constitutional monarchy. This decision came after Louis and his family had unsuccessfully tried to flee France in the Flight to Varennes the month before. Later that day, leaders of the republicans in France rallied against this decision.

Jacques Pierre Brissot was the editor and main writer of Le Patriote français and president of the Comité des Recherches of Paris, and he drew up a petition demanding the removal of the king. A crowd of 50,000 people gathered at the Champ de Mars on 17 July to sign the petition, and about 6,000 signed it. However, two suspicious people had been found hiding at the Champ de Mars earlier that day, "possibly with the intention of getting a better view of the ladies' ankles"; they were hanged by those who found them, and Paris Mayor Jean Sylvain Bailly used this incident to declare martial law. Lafayette and the National Guard under his command were able to disperse that crowd.

Georges Danton and Camille Desmoulins had led the crowd, and they returned in even higher numbers that afternoon. The larger crowd was also more determined than the first, and Lafayette again tried to disperse it. In retaliation, they threw stones at the National Guard. After firing unsuccessful warning shots, the National Guard opened fire directly on the crowd. The exact numbers of dead and wounded are unknown; estimates range from a dozen to 50 dead.

== Context ==
When Louis XVI and his family fled to Varennes, it set off political turmoil: the people of France feeling betrayal and anger towards the king. The national assembly had earlier received information about a possible plan for the king to flee. The idea that Louis planned on fleeing the Tuileries palace began in early 1791 and was one of the causes of the Day of Daggers on 28 February 1791. The escape event was not subtly planned, and enough suspicions were aroused in those working in the palace that the information trickled down to newspapers. The Marquis de Lafayette promised on his own life that such a thing was untrue, and was proven wrong when the king did try to escape. Lafayette and the Assembly created a lie that the king had been kidnapped. Ultimately the king and his family were brought back, and the assembly decided that he needed to be a part of the government if he agreed to consent to the constitution.

At the time of the massacre, divisions within the Third Estate had already begun to grow. Many workers were angered by the closing of various workshops, which took away jobs, leaving some unemployed. Higher skilled journeymen were also angered due to a lack of increase in wages since the beginning of the Revolution. The attempted flight of the king only increased the tensions between groups. The massacre was the direct result of various factions reacting to the decree by the Constituent Assembly in different ways. The Cordeliers Club, a populist group, chose to create a petition for a protest. This was initially backed by the Jacobins, though support was withdrawn at Robespierre's suggestion. The Cordeliers proceeded by creating a more radical petition calling for a republic and planning a protest that would help gain more signatures.

Based on records of the petition and of the dead bodies, the crowd was made up of individuals from the poorer sections of Paris, some of whom may not have been able to read. The organisers seemed to desire representation of Paris as a whole, rather than any specific section.

== Results ==
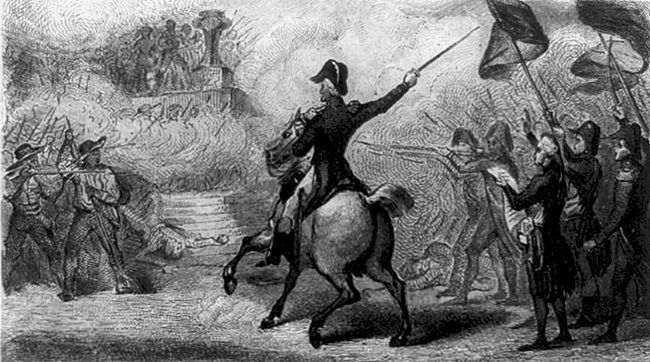
Illustration of the massacre depicting Lafayette ordering his troops to fire on the protesters

After the massacre, the republican movement seemed to be over. Two hundred of the activists involved with the movement were arrested after the massacre, while others had to go into hiding. Organisations stopped meeting and radical newspapers no longer published. However, they were not deterred for long.

Lafayette, the commander of the National Guard, was previously long revered as the hero of the American Revolutionary War. Many French looked up to Lafayette with hope, expecting him also to lead the French Revolution in the right direction. One year before, on the very same Champ de Mars, he played a prominent ceremonial role during the first Fête de la Fédération (14 July 1790), in memory of the 1789 Storming of the Bastille. However, Lafayette's reputation among the French never recovered from this bloody episode. The people no longer looked towards him as an ally or supported him after he and his men fired deadly shots into the crowd. His influence in Paris diminished accordingly. He would still command French armies from April to August 1792, but, due to the discovery that he acted in support of the King during the Storming of the Tuileries, he fled to Belgium where he surrendered to Austrian authorities on August 19, 1792.

In 1793, Bailly, the former mayor of Paris, was executed, with one of the charges against him being the instigation of the massacre.

== Contemporary news report ==
The following is an excerpt of a news report about the incident printed in the Les Révolutions de Paris, a republican newspaper in support of the anti-royalists who had assembled on the Champ de Mars:

Blood has just flowed on the field of the federation, staining the altar of the fatherland. Men and women have had their throats slashed and the citizens are at a loss. What shall become of liberty? Some say that it has been destroyed, and that the counter revolution has won. Others are certain that liberty has been avenged, and that the Revolution has been unshakably consolidated. Let us impartially examine these two such strangely differing views. ...
The majority of the National Assembly, the department, the Paris municipality, and many of the writers say that the capital is overrun by brigands, that these brigands are paid by agents of foreign courts, and that they are in alliance with the factions that secretly conspire against France. They say that at ten o'clock on Sunday morning, two citizens were sacrificed to their fury. They say these citizens insulted, molested and provoked the National Guard, assassinated several of the citizen soldiers; that they went so far as to try to kill the Commandant-General. And finally they say that they gathered at the Champ de Mars for the sole purpose of disturbing public peace and order, getting so carried away that perhaps it was hard to restrain themselves two hours later. From this point of view, it is certain that the Paris municipality could have and should have taken the severe measures that it did. It is better to sacrifice some thirty wretched vagabonds than to risk the safety of twenty-five million citizens.
However, if the victims of Champ de Mars were not brigands, if these victims were peaceful citizens with their wives and children, and if that terrible scene is but the result of a formidable coalition against the progress of the Revolution, then liberty is truly in danger, and the declaration of martial law is a horrible crime, and the sure precursor of counterrevolution. ...
The field of the federation . . . is a vast plain, at the center of which the altar of the fatherland is located, and where the slopes surrounding the plain are cut at intervals to facilitate entry and exit. One section of the troops entered at the far side of the military school, another came through the entrance somewhat lower down, and a third by the gate that opens on to the Grande Rue de Chaillot, where the red flag (Note: The red flag was a widely understood signal that martial law had been declared and that normal civil policing was suspended. Under martial law, the National Guard was permitted to discharge their weapons when ordered.) was placed. The people at the altar, more than fifteen thousand strong, had hardly noticed the flag when shots were heard. "Do not move, they are firing blanks. They must come here to post the law." The troops advanced a second time. The composure of the faces of those who surrounded the altar did not change. But when a third volley mowed many of them down, the crowd fled, leaving only a group of a hundred people at the altar itself. Alas, they paid dearly for their courage and blind trust in the law. Men, women, even a child, were massacred there, massacred on the altar of the fatherland.

== Text of the petition ==
The following is the text of the manifesto which was being read and signed by French citizens in the Champ de Mars on the day of the massacre, 17 July 1791:

THE undersigned Frenchmen, members of the sovereign people, considering that, in questions concerning the safety of the people, it is their right to express their will in order to enlighten and guide their deputies,
THAT no question has ever arisen more important than the King's desertion, (Note: The previous month, on 20 and 21 June 1791, the king and his family had, with the connivance of others (some of them foreign), escaped from Paris in an attempt to reach the fortress of Montmédy in the northeast. There, they expected to find an enclave of royalists in sufficient numbers to ensure their safety and, perhaps, to mount a counter-revolution. They were, however, promptly apprehended at a place called Varennes in the Argonne and returned to Paris. See Flight to Varennes for more details.)
THAT the decree of 15 July contains no decision concerning Louis XVI,
THAT, in obeying this decree, it is necessary to decide promptly the future of this individual,
THAT his conduct must form the basis of this decision,
THAT Louis XVI, having accepted Royal functions, and sworn to defend the Constitution, has deserted the post entrusted to him; has protested against that very Constitution in a declaration written and signed in his own hand; has attempted, by his flight and his orders, to paralyze the executive power, and to upset the Constitution in complicity with men who are today awaiting trial for such an attempt,
THAT his perjury, his desertion, his protest, not to speak of all the other criminal acts which have proceeded, accompanied, and followed them, involve a formal abdication of the constitutional Crown entrusted to him,
THAT the National Assembly has so judged in assuming the executive power, suspending the Royal authority and holding him in a state of arrest,
THAT fresh promises from Louis XVI to observe the Constitution cannot offer the Nation a sufficient guarantee against a fresh perjury and a new conspiracy.
CONSIDERING finally that it would be as contrary to the majesty of the outraged Nation as it would be contrary to its interest to confide the reins of empire to a perjurer, a traitor, and a fugitive, [we] formally and specifically demand that the Assembly receive the abdication made on 21 June by Louis XVI of the crown which had been delegated to him, and provide for his successor in the constitutional manner, [and we] declare that the undersigned will never recognise Louis XVI as their King unless the majority of the Nation express a desire contrary to the present petition.
