= Louis XVI and the Legislative Assembly =

Period In the history of France From 1789-1799

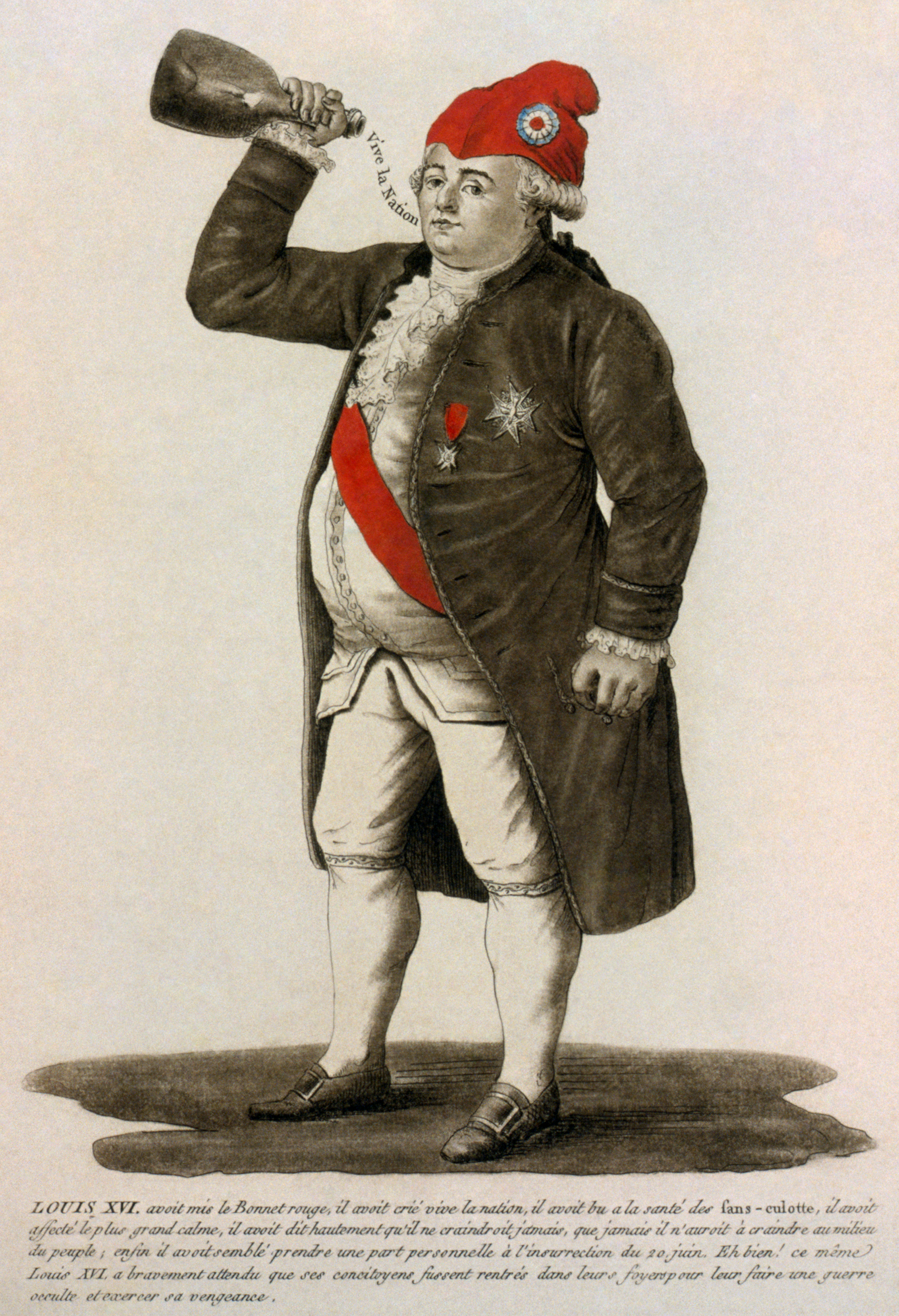
Tinted etching of Louis XVI, 1792. The caption refers to Louis's capitulation to the National Assembly, and concludes "The same Louis XVI who bravely waits until his fellow citizens return to their hearths to plan a secret war and extract his revenge."

The French Revolution was a period in the history of France covering 1789 to 1799, in which republicans overthrew the Bourbon monarchy and the Catholic Church in France perforce underwent radical restructuring. This article covers the one-year period from 1 October 1791 to September 1792, during which France was governed by the Legislative Assembly, operating under the French Constitution of 1791, between the periods of the National Constituent Assembly and of the National Convention.

== Legislative Assembly ==
The National Constituent Assembly dissolved itself on 1 October 1791. Upon Maximilien Robespierre's motion it had decreed that none of its members should be capable of sitting in the next legislature; this is known as the Self-denying Ordinance. Its legacy, the Constitution of 1791, attempted to institute a liberal constitutional monarchy. This had been envisioned as an arrangement not to be tampered with for a generation but, in the event, it did not last a year. In the attempt to govern, the Assembly failed altogether. According to the Encyclopædia Britannica Eleventh Edition, "It left behind an empty treasury, an undisciplined army and navy, and a people debauched by safe and successful riot."

In the elections of 1791, despite a limited electoral franchise, the party which desired to carry the French Revolution further had a success disproportionate to its numbers, a triumph for the Jacobin Club and by its affiliated societies throughout France. The Legislative Assembly first met on 1 October 1791. It consisted of 745 members. Few were nobles, very few were clergymen, and the great body came from the middle class. The members were generally young, and since none had sat in the previous Assembly, they largely lacked national political experience.

The right consisted of about 165 "Feuillants". Among them were some able men, such as Mathieu Dumas, Ramond, Vaublanc, Beugnot and Bigot de Préamenau, but they were guided chiefly by persons outside the House, because incapable of re-election: Barnave, Adrien Duport, and the brothers Alexander and Charles Lameth. The left consisted of about 330 Jacobins, a term which still included the emergent party afterwards known as the Girondins or Girondists, so termed because several of their leaders came from the region of the Gironde in southern France. Among the extreme left—those who would retain the name of Jacobins—sat Cambon, Couthon, Antoine-Christophe Merlin ("Merlin de Thionville"), François Chabot, and Claude Bazire.

The Girondins could claim the most brilliant orators: Pierre Victurnien Vergniaud, Marguerite-Élie Guadet, Armand Gensonné, and Maximin Isnard (the last being from Provence). Jacques Pierre Brissot ("Brissot de Warville"), a restless pamphleteer and editor of the newspaper Patriote, exerted such great influence over the party that it has sometimes gone by his name ("Brissotins"). Also aligned with the Girondins were Condorcet, secretary of the Assembly and Pétion, barred from the Legislative Assembly because he had been in the Constitutional Assembly, but who soon became mayor of Paris. This strong representation of the left in the Assembly was supplemented by the political clubs and the disorderly revolutionary elements in Paris and throughout France. The remainder of the Assembly, about 350 deputies, did not belong to any definite party but voted most often with the left.

== Ministers to the king ==
The king's ministers, named by him and excluded from the Assembly, were mostly persons of little mark. Montmorin gave up the portfolio of foreign affairs on 31 October 1791 and was succeeded by De Lessart, the previous minister of finance. Bon-Claude Cahier de Gerville was minister of the interior; Louis Hardouin Tarbé, minister of finance; and Bertrand de Molleville, minister of marine. But the only minister who influenced the course of affairs was the comte de Narbonne, minister of war.

Overtly, the king (despite his earlier attempt to escape Paris during the flight to Varennes) had embraced the newly codified constitution. It seems unlikely that he could have been satisfied with losing his previous absolute power, but he may well have been sincerely trying to make the best of what, from his point of view, was a bad situation. Marie Antoinette surely wished to shake off the impotence and humiliation of the Crown, and for this end she still clung to the hope of foreign succour and corresponded with Vienna.

== Politics of the left ==
The left had three objects of enmity. First among these was the royal couple, King Louis XVI, Queen Marie Antoinette and the royal family. The left as a whole wished to replace the monarchy with a republic, although this was not initially the public position of most of them. Second came the émigrés—seen as a threat from abroad—and, third, the nonjuring clergy.

Those émigrés who had assembled in arms on the territories of the electors of Mainz and Treves (Trier) and in the Austrian Netherlands had put themselves in the position of public enemies. Their chiefs were the king's brothers, who affected to consider Louis as a captive and his acts as therefore invalid. The Count of Provence gave himself the airs of a regent and surrounded himself with a ministry. The only actual danger posed by the émigrés was symbolic: that they were only a few thousand strong; that they had no competent leader and no money; and that although they had earlier been of some diplomatic significance, they were increasingly unwelcome to the rulers whose hospitality they abused. However, Mignet claims that the threat was more substantive and their numbers growing and that "the ambassadors of the emigrants were received, while those of the French government were dismissed, ill received, or even thrown into prison, as in the case of M. Duveryer."

The nonjuring clergy—those who refused to take an oath under the Civil Constitution of the Clergy—although harassed by the local authorities, kept the respect and confidence of most Catholics. According to Montague (1911), "No acts of disloyalty were proved against them, and commissioners of the National Assembly reported to its successor that their flocks only desired to be let alone. But the anti-clerical bias of the Legislative Assembly was too strong for such a policy." Mignet, however, quotes the marquis de Ferrières, "Priests, and especially bishops employed all the resources of fanaticism to excite the people, in town and country, against the civil constitution of the clergy", and points out that Bishops ordered the priests no longer to perform divine service in the same church with the constitutional priests. It was increasingly unlikely that two rival Churches could co-exist. Insurrection along religious lines broke out in Calvados, Gévaudan, and the Vendée (see Revolt in the Vendée).

== The king exercises his veto ==
From the first, relations between the king and the Legislative Assembly were less than friendly. The king refused to meet the Assembly's initial delegation in person; the Assembly voted to deprive the ceremony of the king's visit to their hall of almost all customary pomp (although the vote was rescinded the following day, and the king's address was generally well received).

On 9 November 1791 the Assembly decreed that the émigrés assembled on the frontiers should be liable to the penalties of death and confiscation if they remained so assembled on 1 January following. (The legislation was clearly directed against those who had taken up arms or engaged in diplomacy: it was reasonably indulgent towards those who simply felt safer abroad.) Louis did not love his brothers, and he detested their policy, which without rendering him any service made his liberty and even his life precarious; yet, loath to condemn them to death, he vetoed the decree. He did, however, sign a decree of 30 October, stating that his eldest brother Louis-Stanislaus-Xavier was required to return to France in two months, or at the expiration of that period he would be considered to have forfeited his rights as regent.

On 29 November 1791 the Assembly decreed that every non-juring clergyman must take within eight days the civic oath, substantially the same as the oath previously administered, on pain of losing his pension and, if any troubles broke out, of being deported. This decree Louis vetoed as a matter of conscience. In either case his resistance only served to give a weapon to his enemies in the Assembly. But foreign affairs were at this time the most critical.

== A new administration in Paris ==
Following the same policy under which the members of the Constituent Assembly had barred themselves from the Legislative Assembly, in October, Lafayette resigned the command of the National Guard, and Bailly retired from the mayoralty of Paris. Most of those who wished to continue a constitutional monarchy (against the increasingly republican legislature) wished Lafayette to succeed Bailly as mayor. However, afraid of Lafayette as a rival to the king, the court actually favored and assisted the Girondist Pétion in the election. In the election of 4 November, Pétion received 9,708 votes in a total of 10,632 and became the new mayor.

== War approaches ==
The armed bodies of émigrés on the territory of the Holy Roman Empire afforded matter of complaint to France. The persistence of the French in offering only money as compensation to the German princes who had claims in Alsace afforded matter of complaint to the Empire. Foreign statesmen noticed with alarm the effect of the French Revolution upon opinion in their own countries, and they resented the endeavours of French revolutionaries to make converts there.

Of these statesmen, the emperor Leopold II was the most intelligent. He had skillfully extricated himself from the embarrassments at home and abroad left by his predecessor Joseph II. He had family ties to Louis XVI, and he was obliged, as chief of the Holy Roman Empire, to protect the border princes. On the other hand, he understood the weakness of the Habsburg monarchy. He knew that the Austrian Netherlands, where he had with difficulty restored his authority, were full of friends of the Revolution and that a French army would be welcomed by many Belgians. He despised the weakness and the folly of the émigrés and excluded them from his councils. He earnestly desired to avoid a war which might endanger his sister Marie Antoinette or her husband.

In August 1791 Leopold had met Frederick William II of Prussia at Pillnitz Castle near Dresden, and the two monarchs had joined in stating in the Declaration of Pillnitz that they considered the restoration of order and of monarchy in France an object of interest to all sovereigns. They further declared that they would be ready to act for this purpose in concert with the other powers. Montague (1911) argued that this declaration appeared to have been drawn from Leopold by pressure of circumstances. Leopold well knew that concerted action of the powers was impossible, as Great Britain had firmly resolved not to meddle with French affairs. After Louis had accepted the constitution, Leopold virtually withdrew his declaration. Nevertheless, it remained a grave error of judgment and contributed to the approaching war.

In France many people desired war for various reasons. Narbonne trusted to find in it the means of restoring a certain authority to the crown and of limiting the Revolution. He contemplated a war with Austria only. The Girondins desired war in the hope that it would enable them to abolish monarchy altogether. They desired a general war because they believed that it would carry the Revolution into other countries and make it secure in France by making it universal. The extreme Left had the same objects, but it held that a war for those objects could not safely be entrusted to the king and his ministers. Victory would revive the power of the crown; defeat would be the undoing of the Revolution. Robespierre also argued against the Girondins' objective of using war as a means of exporting revolution, on the grounds that "nobody likes armed missionaries".

Hence Robespierre and those who thought with him desired peace. The French nation generally had never approved of the Austrian alliance, and regarded the Habsburgs as traditional enemies. The views of the king and queen on the matter continue to be a matter of controversy. Some historians argue that they dreaded a war with Austria; others that they wanted war because they thought France would lose and the Austrians and the other invaders would then restore the absolute monarchy.

France was in no condition to wage a serious war. The constitution was unworkable and the governing authorities were mutually hostile. The finances remained in disorder, with inflation rampant: assignats of the face value of 800,000,000 livres were issued by the Legislative Assembly after September 1790. By September 1791, the value of the assignats had depreciated by 18-20 percent. The army had been thinned by desertion and was enervated by long ill-discipline. The fortresses were in bad condition and short of supplies.

In October Leopold ordered the dispersion of the émigrés who had mustered in arms in the Austrian Netherlands. His example was followed by the electors of Treves and Mainz. At the same time they implored the emperor's protection, and the Austrian chancellor Wenzel Anton von Kaunitz informed Noailles, the French ambassador that this protection would be given if necessary. Narbonne demanded a credit of 20,000,000 livres, which the Assembly granted. He made a tour of inspection in the north of France and reported untruly to the Assembly that all was in readiness for war. On 14 January 1792 the diplomatic committee reported to the Assembly that the emperor should be required to give satisfactory assurances before 10 February. The Assembly put off the term to 1 March.

In February Leopold concluded a defensive treaty with Frederick William II. But there was no mutual confidence between the sovereigns, who were at that very time pursuing opposite policies with regard to Poland. Leopold still hesitated and still hoped to avoid war. He died on 1 March 1792, and the imperial dignity became vacant. The hereditary dominions of Austria passed to his son Francis, afterwards the emperor Francis II, a youth of small abilities and no experience. The real conduct of affairs fell, therefore, to the aged Kaunitz.

In France Narbonne failed to carry the king or his colleagues along with him. The king took courage to dismiss him on 9 March 1792, whereupon the Legislative Assembly testified its confidence in Narbonne. De Lessart having incurred its anger by the tameness of his replies to Austrian dictation, the Assembly voted his impeachment.

== The Girondin ministry ==
The king, seeing no other course open, formed a new ministry which was chiefly Girondin. Jean-Marie Roland became minister of the interior, Étienne Clavière of finance, Pierre Marie de Grave of war, and Jean de Lacoste of marine. Far abler and more resolute than any of these men was Charles François Dumouriez, the new minister for foreign affairs. A soldier by profession, he had been employed in the secret diplomacy of Louis XV and had thus gained a wide knowledge of international politics. He stood aloof from parties and had no rigid principles, but held views closely resembling those of Narbonne. He wished for a war with Austria which should restore some influence to the crown and make himself the arbiter of France.

It is difficult today to imagine how different these men were from the previous ministers. According to Mignet, the court named this ministry "le Ministère Sans-Culotte", and the first time Roland appeared at court—with laces rather than buckles on his shoes—the master of the ceremonies initially refused to admit him.

The king bent to necessity, and on 20 April 1792 came to the Assembly with the proposal that war should be declared against Austria. It was carried by acclamation. Dumouriez intended to begin with an invasion of the Austrian Netherlands. As this would awaken English jealousy, he sent Talleyrand to London with assurances that, if victorious, the French would annex no territory.

== The initial disasters of war ==
The French war plan envisaged invading the Netherlands at three points simultaneously. Lafayette would march against Namur, Biron against Mons, and Dillon against Tournai. But the first movement disclosed the miserable state of the army. Smitten with panic, Dillon's force fled at sight of the enemy, and Dillon, after receiving a wound from one of his own soldiers, was murdered by the mob of Lille. Biron was easily routed before Mons. On hearing of these disasters Lafayette found it necessary to retreat.

This shameful discomfiture quickened all the suspicion and jealousy fermenting in France. De Grave had to resign and was succeeded by Servan. The Austrian forces in the Netherlands were, however, so weak that they could not take the offensive. Austria demanded help from Prussia under the terms of their recent alliance, and the claim was admitted. Prussia declared war against France, and the Duke of Brunswick was chosen to command the allied forces, but various causes delayed action. Austrian and Prussian interests clashed in Poland. The Austrian government wished to preserve a harmless neighbour. The Prussian government desired another Polish partition and a large tract of Polish territory. Only after long discussion was it agreed that Prussia should be free to act in Poland, while Austria might find compensation in provinces conquered from France.

The respite thus given allowed France to improve the army. Meantime the Legislative Assembly passed three decrees: one for the deportation of non-juring priests, another to suppress the king's Constitutional Guard, and a third for the establishment of a camp of fédérés near Paris. Louis consented to sacrifice his guard, but vetoed the other decrees. Roland having addressed to him an arrogant letter of remonstrance (mainly about the matter of the non-juring priests), the king with the support of Dumouriez dismissed Roland, Servan and Clavière. Dumouriez then took the ministry of war, and the other places were filled with such men as could be had, mainly members of the already collapsing Feuillant faction. Dumouriez, who cared only for the successful prosecution of the war, urged the king to accept the decrees. As Louis was obstinate, Dumouriez felt that he could do no more. Dumouriez resigned office on 15 June 1792 and went to join the army of the north.

Lafayette, who remained faithful to the constitution of 1791, ventured on a letter of remonstrance to the Assembly. It paid no attention, for Lafayette could no longer sway the people. Furthermore, coming as it did from a young general at the head of his army, the letter suggested to many ambition on Lafayette's part. The left now suspected Lafayette of precisely the type of ambition of which he had already been suspected by the court.

== Protests of 20 June ==
The Jacobins tried to frighten the king into accepting the decrees and recalling his ministers. On 20 June 1792 the armed populace invaded the hall of the Assembly and the royal apartments in the Tuileries. For some hours the king and queen were in the utmost peril. With passive courage Louis refrained from making any promise to the insurgents.

The failure of the insurrection encouraged a movement in favour of the king. Some twenty thousand Parisians signed a petition expressing sympathy with Louis. Addresses of like tenor poured in from the departments and the provincial cities. Lafayette himself came to Paris in the hope of rallying the constitutional party, but the king and queen eluded his offers of assistance. They had always disliked and distrusted Lafayette and the Feuillants, and now preferred to rest their hopes of deliverance on the foreigners. Lafayette returned to his troops without having effected anything.

The Girondins made a last advance to Louis, offering to save the monarchy if he would accept them as ministers. His refusal united all the Jacobins in the project of overturning the monarchy by force.

== The Day of 10 August ==
The ruling spirit of this new revolution was Danton, a barrister only thirty-two years old, who had not sat in either Assembly, although he had been the leader of the Cordeliers, an advanced republican club, and had a strong hold on the common people of Paris. Danton and his friends were assisted in their work by the fear of invasion, for the allied army was at length mustering on the frontier. The Assembly declared the country in danger. All the regular troops in or near Paris were sent to the front. Volunteers and fédérés were constantly arriving in Paris, and, although most went on to join the army, the Jacobins enlisted those who were suitable for their purpose, especially some 500 whom Barbaroux, a Girondin, had summoned from Marseille. At the same time the National Guard – up to now middle-class in character—was opened to those from the lower classes. Brunswick's famous declaration of 25 July 1792, announcing that the allies would enter France to restore the royal authority and would visit the Assembly and the city of Paris with military execution if any further outrage were offered to the king, heated the republican spirit to fury. It was resolved to strike the decisive blow on 10 August.

On the night of 9 August a new revolutionary Paris Commune took possession of the Hôtel de Ville, and early on the morning of 10 August the insurgents assailed the Tuileries. As the preparations of the Jacobins had been notorious, some measures of defence had been taken. Besides a few gentlemen in arms and a number of National Guards, the palace was garrisoned by the Swiss Guard, about 950 strong. The disparity of force was not so great as to make resistance altogether hopeless. But Louis let himself be persuaded into betraying his own cause and retiring with his family under the shelter of the Assembly. The National Guards either dispersed or fraternised with the assailants. The Swiss Guard stood firm, and, possibly by accident, a fusillade began. The enemy were gaining ground when the Swiss received an order from the king to cease firing and withdraw. They were mostly shot down as they were retiring, and of those who surrendered about 60 were massacred by the mob as they were being taken under escort to the Hotel de Ville.

== Insurrection and constitutional crisis ==
The king and queen spent long hours in a reporter's box while the Legislative Assembly discussed their fate and the fate of the French monarchy. Little more than a third of the deputies were present, almost all of them Jacobins. They decreed that Louis should be suspended from his office and that a convention should be summoned to give France a new constitution. An executive council was formed by recalling Roland, Clavière and Servan to office and joining with them Danton as minister of justice, Lebrun as minister of foreign affairs, and Monge as minister of marine.

When Lafayette heard of the insurrection in Paris he tried to rally his troops in defence of the constitution, but they refused to follow him. He was driven to cross the frontier and surrender himself to the Austrians. Dumouriez was named his successor. But the new government was still beset with danger. It had no root in law and little hold on public opinion. It could not lean on the Assembly, a mere shrunken remnant, whose days were numbered. It remained dependent on the power which had set it up, the revolutionary Commune of Paris. The Commune could therefore extort what concessions it pleased. It got the custody of the king and his family, who were imprisoned in the Temple. Having obtained an indefinite power of arrest, it soon filled the prisons of Paris.

As the elections to the convention were close at hand, the Commune resolved to strike the public with terror by the slaughter of its prisoners. It found its opportunity in the progress of invasion. On 19 August 1792 Brunswick crossed the frontier. On 22 August Longwy surrendered. Verdun was invested and seemed likely to fall. On 1 September the Commune declared a state of emergency by decreeing that on the following day the tocsin should be rung, all able-bodied citizens convened in the Champ de Mars, and 60,000 volunteers enrolled for the defence of the country.

While this assembly was in progress teams of executioners were sent to the prisons and began a butchery (September Massacres) which lasted four days and consumed 1400 victims. The Commune addressed a circular letter to the other cities of France inviting them to follow this example. A number of state prisoners awaiting trial at Orléans were ordered to Paris and on the way were slaughtered at Versailles. The Assembly offered a feeble resistance to these actions. Danton can hardly be acquitted of connivance at them. Roland hinted disapproval, but did not venture more. He with many other Girondins had been marked for slaughter in the original project.

The elections to the convention were by almost universal suffrage, but indifference or intimidation reduced the voters to a small number. Many who had sat in the National Constituent Assembly and many more who had sat in the Legislative Assembly were returned. The Convention met on 20 September and became the new de facto government of France.
