= Charles Jean Marie Barbaroux =

French politician (1767–1794)

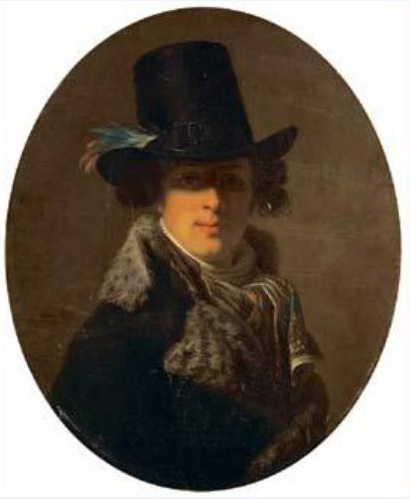
- Portrait by Henri-Pierre Danloux

Deputy in the National Convention
- In office 5 September 1792 – 25 June 1794
- Constituency: Bouches-du-Rhône

Personal details
- Born: 6 March 1767 Marseille, Provence, France
- Died: 25 June 1794 (aged 27) Bordeaux, France
- Party: Girondins

Charles Jean Marie Barbaroux (French pronunciation: [ʃaʁl ʒɑ̃ maʁi baʁbaʁu]; 6 March 1767 – 25 June 1794) was a Girondin politician of the Revolutionary period and Freemason. He was the leader of the Fédérés and popular in the South of France.

== Biography ==
=== Early career ===
Born in Marseille, Barbaroux was educated at first by the local Oratorians, then studied law in Aix-en-Provence, and became a successful lawyer. In 1789 he was appointed greffier to the commune of Marseille, and in 1792 was commissioned to go to the Legislative Assembly and demand the accusation of the directorate of the département of Bouches-du-Rhône, as accomplices in a Royalist movement in Arles.

In Paris, he was received in the Jacobin club, and contacted Jacques Pierre Brissot and Jean Marie Roland de la Platiere and his wife Madame Roland. It was at his instigation that Marseille sent to Paris the battalion of volunteers that arrived in the city singing the Marseillaise. A significant maneuver took place during the night of 4 August 1792 when volunteers from Marseille led by Barbaroux moved into the Cordeliers Convent, and contributed to the insurrection of 10 August 1792. According to Barbaroux, who visited Robespierre early August 1792, his pretty boudoir was full of images of himself in every form and art; a painting, a drawing, a bust, a relief and six physionotraces on the tables.

=== Convention ===
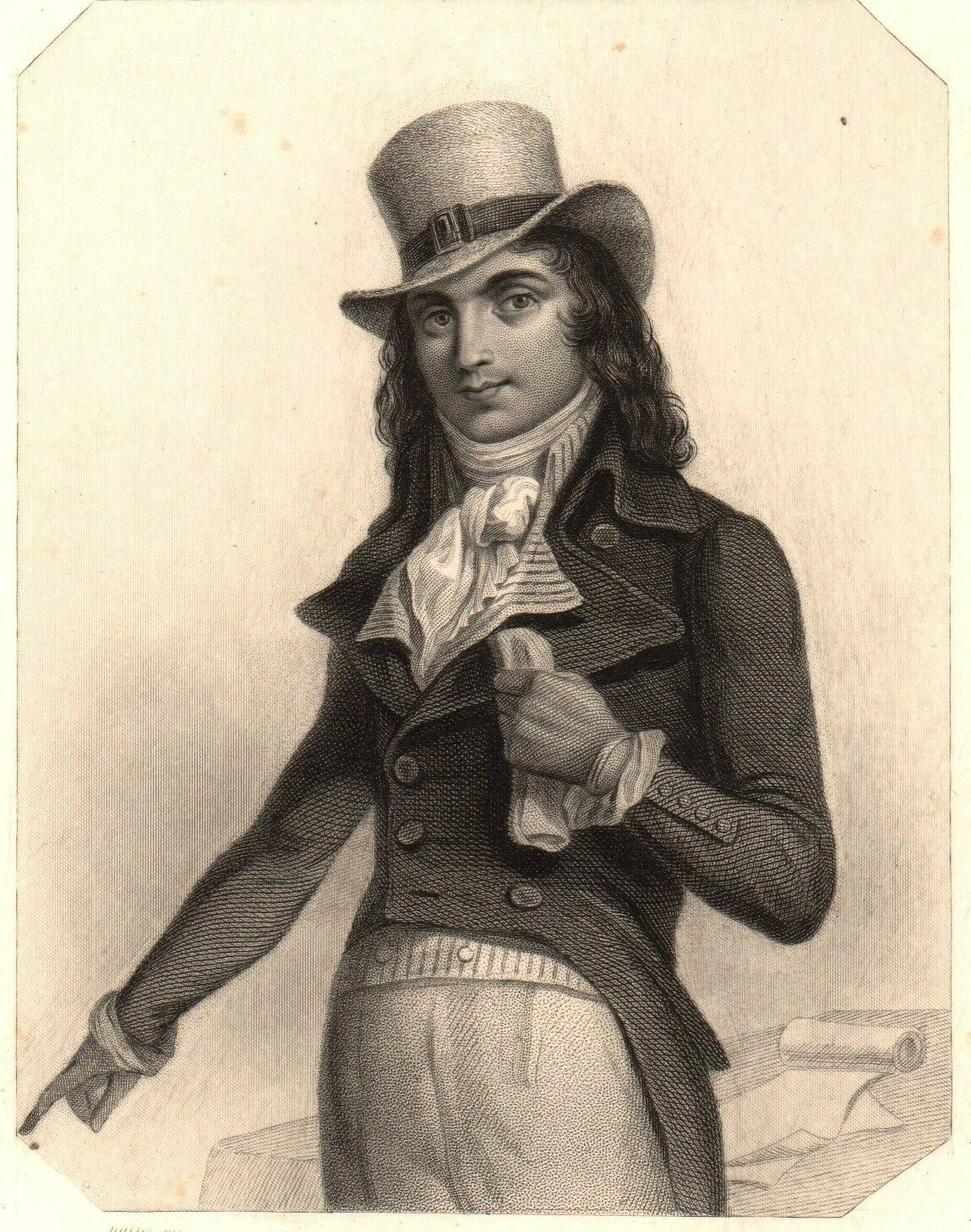
Charles Barbaroux by Auguste Raffet

Returning to Marseille, he was elected deputy to the National Convention with 775 votes out of 776 cast. He viewed himself as an opponent of the Montagnards from the first day of sessions. On 25 and 26 September, Barbaroux and the Girondist Lasource accused Maximilien Robespierre of wanting to form a dictatorship. He attacked Jean-Paul Marat and the September Massacres, and proposed to break up the Commune of Paris. At the end of the year, he got the Act of Accusation against the king adopted, and in the trial voted for his capital punishment "without appeal and without delay". He then participated in the Constitution Committee that drafted the Girondin constitutional project. Barbaroux called for fixed salaries and fixed prices for grain and meat in April 1793.

On 29 May 1793, Robespierre attacked Barbaroux. During the final struggle between the Girondists and the Montagnards (Insurrection of 31 May - 2 June 1793), Barbaroux refused to resign as deputy, and rejected the offer made by the sans-culottes in Paris to give hostages for the arrested representatives. On 2 June Barbaroux was declared an enemy of the republic by Saint-Juste. He succeeded in escaping, first to Caen, where he organized the Girondist rebellion, then to Saint-Émilion, where he wrote his Mémoires (first published in 1822 by his son, and re-edited in 1866). On 18 June Élie Guadet and Jean-Baptiste Salle were arrested; Pétion de Villeneuve and Francois Buzot succeeded in killing themselves. Barbaroux attempted to shoot himself, but was only wounded. He was taken to Bordeaux, where he was guillotined once his identity was established.
