= Jérôme Pétion de Villeneuve =

French politician (1756–1794)

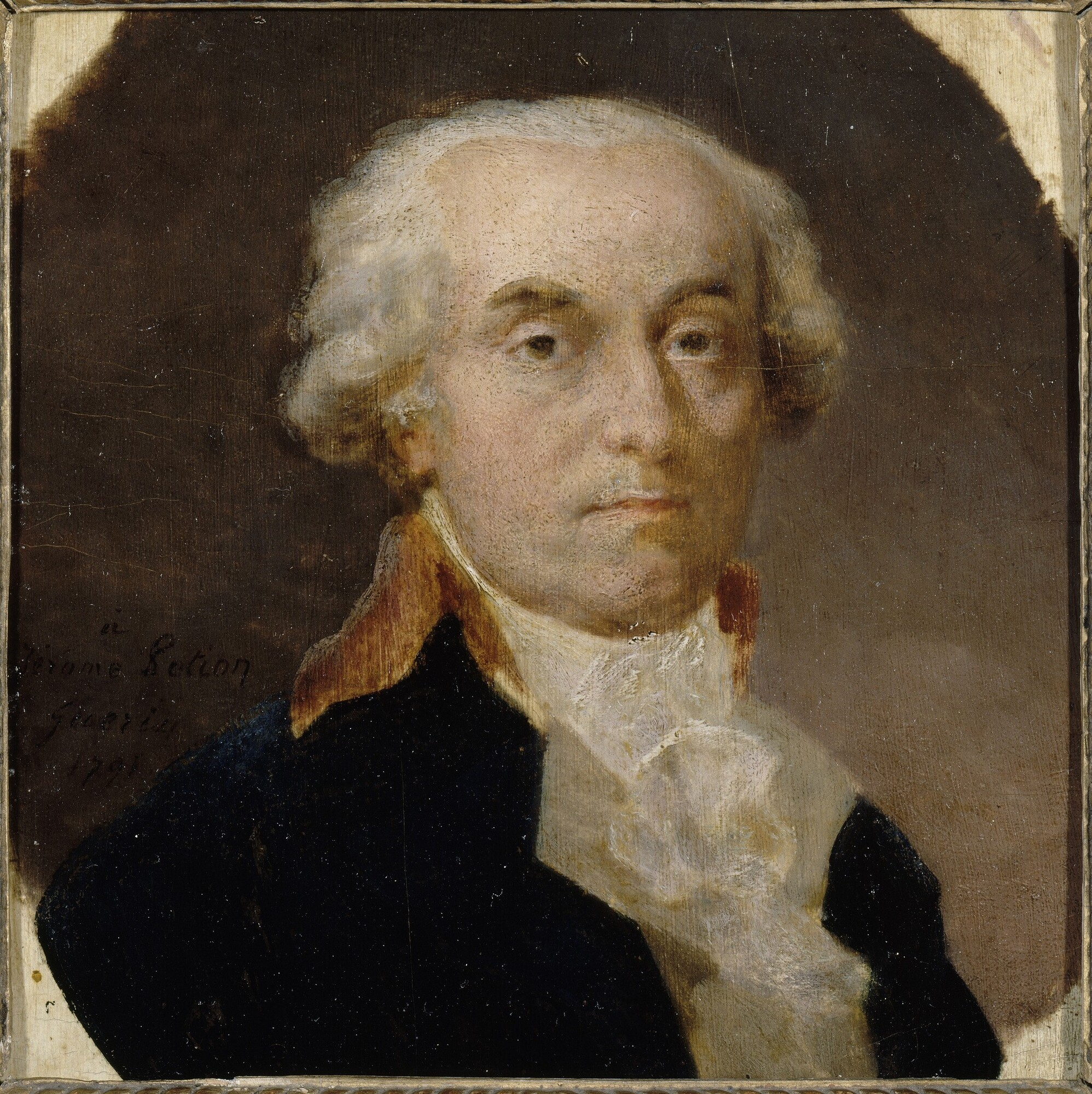
- Portrait by Jean-Urbain Guérin

1st President of the National Convention
- In office 20 September – 4 October 1792
- Preceded by: Louis XVI (King of France)
- Succeeded by: Jean-François Delacroix

2nd Mayor of Paris
- In office 18 November 1791 – 15 October 1792
- Preceded by: Jean Sylvain Bailly
- Succeeded by: Philibert Borie (temporary mayor)

Personal details
- Born: 3 January 1756 Chartres, Eure-et-Loir, Kingdom of France
- Died: 18 June 1794 (aged 38) Saint-Magne-de-Castillon, near Saint-Émilion, Gironde, France
- Cause of death: Suicide
- Party: Girondist
- Occupation: Writer; Politician

Jérôme Pétion de Villeneuve (French pronunciation: [ʒeʁom petjɔ̃ də vilnœv]; 3 January 1756 – 18 June 1794) was a French writer and politician who served as the second mayor of Paris, from 1791 to 1792, and the first regular president of the National Convention in 1792. During the French Revolution, he was associated with the moderate Girondins, and voted against the immediate execution of Louis XVI at the king's trial in January 1793, though he supported a suspended sentence. This led to Pétion's proscription by the Convention alongside other Girondin deputies following the radical insurrection of 31 May – 2 June 1793, and ultimately his suicide together with fellow-Girondin François Buzot while evading arrest during the Terror.

== Early life and work ==
Jérôme Pétion de Villeneuve was the son of a prosecutor at Chartres. Though it is known that he was trained as a lawyer, very few specifics are known about Petion's early life, as he was virtually unknown prior to the French Revolution. He became a lawyer in 1778, and at once began to try to make a name in literature. His first printed work was an essay, Sur les moyens de prévenir l'infanticide, which failed to gain the prize for which it was composed, but pleased Brissot so much that he printed it in vol. vii. of his Bibliothèque philosophique des législateurs.

Pétion's next works, Les Lois civiles, and Essais sur le mariage, in which he advocated the marriage of priests, confirmed his position as a bold reformer. He also attacked long-held Ancien Régime traditions such as primogeniture, accusing it of dividing the countryside into "proletarians and colossal properties." Later works penned by Pétion include his account of Haiti entitled "Reflexions sur la noir et denonciation d'un crime affreux commis a Saint-Domingue" (1790) and "Avis aux francois" in which he chides France for its corruption.

When the elections to the Estates-General took place in 1789, he was elected a deputy to the Tiers Etat for Chartres. Both in the assembly of the Tiers Etat and in the Constituent Assembly Pétion showed himself a radical leader. Although Petion was overshadowed in the Assembly by such orators as Mirabeau and Barnave, his close relationship with Girondin leader Brissot provided him with helpful advice on political conduct. He supported Mirabeau on 23 June, attacked the queen on 5 October, and was elected president on 4 December 1790. On 15 June 1791, he was elected president of the criminal tribunal of Paris. On 21 June 1791, he was chosen one of three commissioners appointed to bring back the king from Varennes, and he has left an account of the journey. After the last meeting of the assembly on 30 September 1791, Robespierre and Pétion were made the popular heroes and were crowned by the populace with civic crowns.

== Mayor of Paris ==
From 24 October - 11 November Pétion visited London and had dinner with Thomas Paine. By late 1791, administrative control of Paris was dominated by the Jacobins and mayor Jean-Sylvain Bailly had resigned due to constant political attacks from the left. Pétion received a still further proof of the affection of the Parisians for him on 16 November 1791, when he was elected second mayor of Paris in succession to Bailly in a contest against Lafayette. (Only 10% of eligible citizens cast a vote, and Pétion won 60% of votes cast). In his mayoralty he exhibited clearly his republican tendency and his hatred of the old monarchy, especially on 20 June 1792, when he allowed the mob to overrun the Tuileries and insult the royal family. For neglecting to protect the Tuileries he was suspended from his functions on 6 July by Louis Alexandre de La Rochefoucauld, the president of the Directory of the Seine département, but the leaders of the Legislative Assembly felt that Pétion's cause was theirs, and rescinded the suspension on 13 July. The next day he was installed. On 4 August, at the head of the municipality of Paris, Pétion demanded the deposition of the king. Following news of the Duke of Brunswick's Prussian Army and the Battle of Verdun (1792), fear encouraged frenzied Parisian mobs to target prisoners, royalist sympathizers, and Catholic priests in a series of acts of violence that would come to be known as the September Massacres.

== Convention, flight and death ==
Pétion was elected to the Convention for Eure-et-Loir and became its first president. After his election he stood down as Mayor of Paris and Nicolas Chambon de Montaux was elected to replace him. L.P. Manuel proposed that the president of the Assembly should have the same authority as the president of the United States; his proposition was at once rejected, but Pétion got the nickname of "Roi Pétion," which contributed to his fall. With disagreements over such items as the necessity of the September Massacres, the Convention was a scene of large-scale political infighting between different factions. The Girondins represented the moderate Right in the Convention while their more radical opponents, the Montagnards, represented the Left and were distinguished by their preference for occupying the higher rows of benches in the Convention. As late as August 1792 he was still friends with Robespierre and, according to Marisa Linton, choosing a side was especially hard for him but in the end his friendship with Brissot proved stronger. Hence he chose the Girondin party, with which he voted for a suspended sentence of execution at the trial of Louis XVI, and in favor of the appeal to the people. He participated to the Constitution Committee that drafted the Girondin constitutional project. He was elected in March 1793 to the Committee of General Defense (the precursor of the Committee of Public Safety) and attacked Robespierre, who had accused him of having known and having kept secret Dumouriez's project of restoring the French Constitution of 1791.

Pétion's name was among those of the twenty-two Girondin deputies proscribed on 2 June 1793 (see Insurrection of 31 May – 2 June 1793). Pétion was one of those who escaped to Caen and raised the standard of provincial insurrection against the Convention; and, when the Norman rising failed, he fled with Marguerite-Élie Guadet, François Nicolas Leonard Buzot, Charles Jean Marie Barbaroux, Jean-Baptiste Salle and Jean-Baptiste Louvet de Couvrai to the Gironde, where they were sheltered by a wigmaker in Saint Emilion. At last, a month before Robespierre's fall on 27 July 1794, the escaped deputies felt themselves no longer safe, and deserted their asylum. Salle and Guadet were arrested on 18 June, taken to Bordeaux and guillotined the next day. Barbaroux was guillotined on 25 June after a botched suicide attempt on 18 June. The bodies of Pétion and Buzot, who had most likely succeeded in killing themselves on 18 June, were found in a field, half eaten by wolves, on 27 June. However, some historians disagree about how the two men actually died. H. Morse Stephens claims that they "blew out their brains" with a pistol, while Charles MacFarlane states that "whether they had committed suicide by poison or by other means, or whether they had perished of hunger" was impossible to say due to the decomposed state the bodies were found in.

== Publications ==
- Moyens proposés pour prévenir l'infanticide (1781)
- Les lois civiles et l'administration de la justice ramenées à un ordre simple et uniforme, ou Réflexions morales, politiques, etc., etc., sur la manière de rendre la justice en France avec le plus de célérité et le moins de frais possible (1782)
- Essai sur le mariage considéré sous des rapports naturels, moraux et politiques, ou Moyens de faciliter et d'encourager les mariages en France (1785)
- Avis aux français sur le salut de la patrie (1789)
- Discours sur les troubles de Saint-Domingue (1790)
- Discours sur la liberté de la presse (1791)
- Redenvoering van Hieronimus Pétion, over de beschuldiging, ingebragt tegen Maximiliaan Robespierre. Haarlem, J. Tetmans (1792)
- Œuvres de Pétion de Villeneuve. Tome premier, 4 parts (1793)
- Mémoires inédits de Pétion et Mémoires de Buzot et de Barbaroux (1866)

See FA Aulard, Les Orateurs de la Constituante (Paris, 1882).
