= Girondins =

Political faction in the French Revolution

- Leader: Marquis de Condorcet; Jean-Marie Roland; Jacques Pierre Brissot; Pierre Victurnien Vergniaud
- Founded: 1791; 235 years ago
- Dissolved: 1793; 233 years ago
- Preceded by: Vonckists (Belgium)
- Headquarters: Bordeaux, Gironde
- Newspaper: Patriote français; Le Courrier de Provence; La chronique de Paris
- Ideology: Abolitionism; Republicanism; Classical liberalism; Economic liberalism
- Political position: Centre-left (Note: On 1 October 1791, the Girondins sat alongside the other Jacobins on the left side of the National Assembly. Parliamentary groups never had any official status and thus historians generally tend to estimate that the 1791 French legislative election had resulted in a majority of around 350 moderate constitutional deputies (the Plain), a right-wing made up of more than 250 Feuillants (divided into Fayettists and Lametists), and a left-wing where around 136 deputies were registered with the Jacobins (even if the Girondin general staff was not very assiduous, preferring the salons), among which several provincials (including Armand Gensonné, Marguerite-Élie Guadet, and Pierre Victurnien Vergniaud, originally from Gironde, hence the name of the Girondins), with a small group of more advanced democrats (Lazare Carnot, Georges Couthon, and Jean-Baptiste Robert Lindet). Deputies of the Plain managed to keep some speed in the debates while the Girondins and the Montagnards were mainly occupied with nagging the opposite side.)

The Girondins (US: /(d)ʒɪˈrɒndɪnz/; French: [ʒiʁɔ̃dɛ̃]), also called Girondists, were a political group during the French Revolution. From 1791 to 1793, the Girondins were active in the Legislative Assembly and the National Convention. Together with the Montagnards, they initially were part of the Jacobin movement. They campaigned for the end of the monarchy, but then resisted the spiraling momentum of the Revolution, which caused a conflict with the more radical Montagnards. They dominated the movement until their fall in the insurrection of 31 May – 2 June 1793, which resulted in the domination of the Montagnards and the purge and eventual mass execution of the Girondins. This event is considered to mark the beginning of the Reign of Terror.

The Girondins were a group of loosely affiliated individuals rather than an organized political party and the name was at first informally applied because the most prominent exponents of their point of view were deputies to the Legislative Assembly from the département of Gironde in southwest France. Girondin leader Jacques Pierre Brissot proposed an ambitious military plan to spread the Revolution internationally, therefore the Girondins were the war party in 1792–1793. Other prominent Girondins included Jean Marie Roland and his wife Madame Roland. They also had an ally in the English-born American activist Thomas Paine.

Brissot and Madame Roland were executed and Jean Roland (who had gone into hiding) committed suicide when he learned about the execution. Paine was imprisoned, but he narrowly escaped execution. The famous painting The Death of Marat depicts the fiery radical journalist and denouncer of the Girondins Jean-Paul Marat after being stabbed to death in his bathtub by Charlotte Corday, a Girondin sympathizer. Corday did not attempt to flee and was arrested and executed.

Historian Alfred Cobban challenged how numerous and powerful the Girondins actually were in his influential work The Social Interpretation of the French Revolution. Citing M. J. Sydenham's study on the subject, The Girondins (1961), Cobban claims there were only 20–25 loosely associated deputies, and they exhibited little in the way of a common policy or political coherence.

== Identity ==
The collective name "Girondins" is used to describe "a loosely knit group of French deputies who contested the Montagnards for control of the National Convention". They were never a formal organization or political party. The name itself was bestowed not by any of its alleged members but by the Montagnards, "who claimed as early as April 1792 that a counterrevolutionary faction had coalesced around deputies of the department of the Gironde". Jacques-Pierre Brissot, Jean Marie Roland and François Buzot were among the most prominent of such deputies and contemporaries called their supporters Brissotins, Rolandins, or Buzotins, depending on which politician was being blamed for their leadership. Other names were employed at the time too, but "Girondins" ultimately became the term favored by historians. The term became standard with Alphonse de Lamartine's History of the Girondins in 1847.

== History ==
=== Rise ===
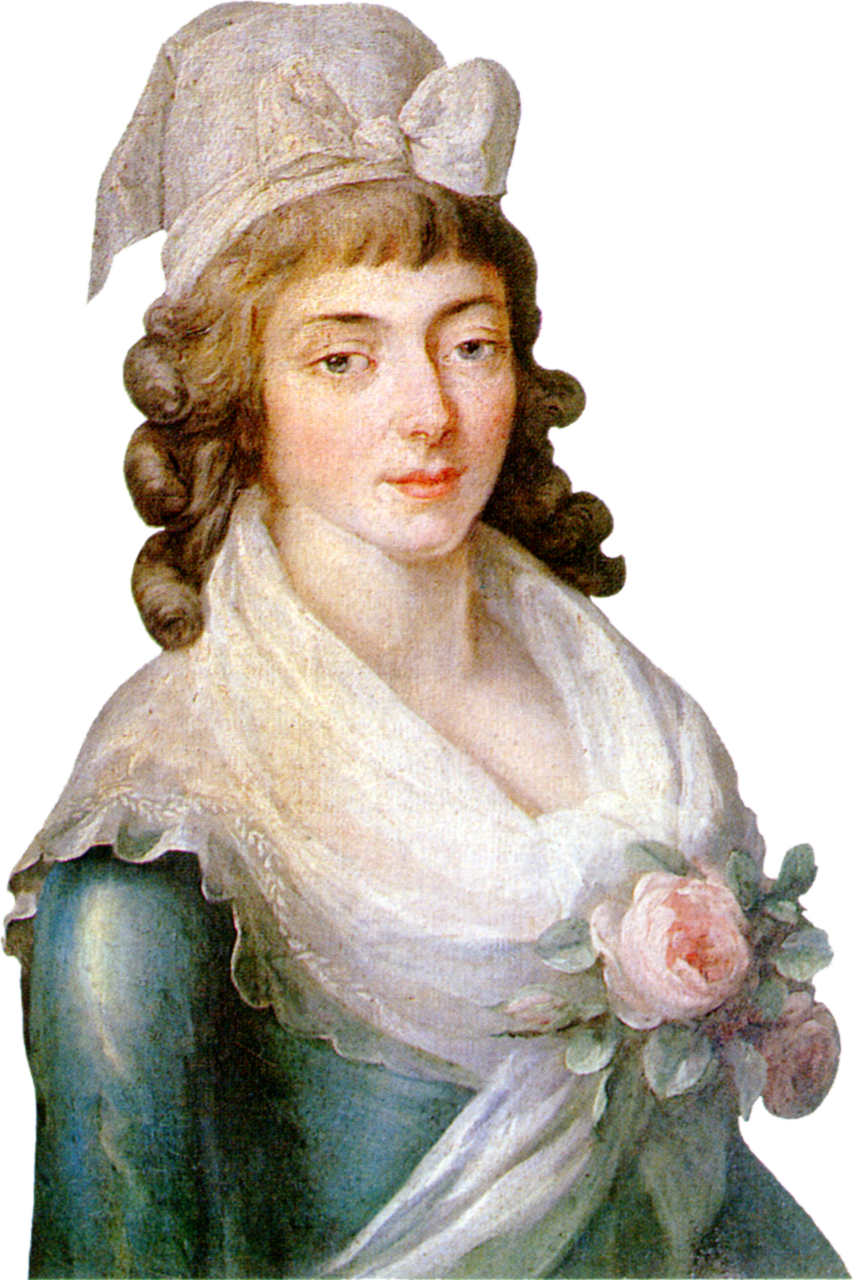
Madame Roland

Twelve deputies represented the département of the Gironde and there were six who sat for this département in both the Legislative Assembly of 1791–1792 and the National Convention of 1792–1795. Five were lawyers: Pierre Victurnien Vergniaud, Marguerite-Élie Guadet, Armand Gensonné, Jean Antoine Laffargue de Grangeneuve and Jean Jay (who was also a Protestant pastor). The other, Jean François Ducos, was a tradesman. In the Legislative Assembly, they represented a compact body of opinion which, though not as yet definitely republican (i.e. against the monarchy), was considerably more "advanced" than the moderate royalism of the majority of the Parisian deputies.

A group of deputies from elsewhere became associated with these views, most notably the Marquis de Condorcet, Claude Fauchet, Marc David Lasource, Maximin Isnard, the Comte de Kersaint, Henri Larivière and above all Jacques Pierre Brissot, Jean Marie Roland and Jérôme Pétion, who was elected mayor of Paris in succession to Jean Sylvain Bailly on 16 November 1791.

Madame Roland, whose salon became their gathering place, had a powerful influence on the spirit and policy of the Girondins with her "romantic republicanism". The party cohesion they possessed was connected to the energy of Brissot, who came to be regarded as their mouthpiece in the Assembly and in the Jacobin Club, hence the name "Brissotins" for his followers. The group was identified by its enemies at the start of the National Convention (20 September 1792). "Brissotins" and "Girondins" were terms of opprobrium used by their enemies in a separate faction of the Jacobin Club, who freely denounced them as enemies of democracy.

=== Foreign policy ===
In the Legislative Assembly of 1791 to 1792, the Girondins represented the principle of democratic revolution within France and patriotic defiance to the other European powers. Girondins supported an aggressive foreign policy and constituted the war party in the period 1792 to 1793, when revolutionary France initiated what became a long series of revolutionary wars against other European powers. Brissot proposed an ambitious military plan to spread the Revolution internationally, one that Napoleon Bonaparte later pursued aggressively. Brissot called on the National Convention to dominate Europe by conquering the Rhineland, Poland and the Netherlands, with the goal of forming a protective ring of satellite republics in Great Britain, Spain and Italy by 1795. The Girondins also called for war against Austria, arguing that such a conflict would rally French patriots around the Revolution, liberate oppressed peoples from despotism, and test the loyalty of King Louis XVI, who had married into Austria's ruling Habsburg family.

=== Montagnards versus Girondins ===
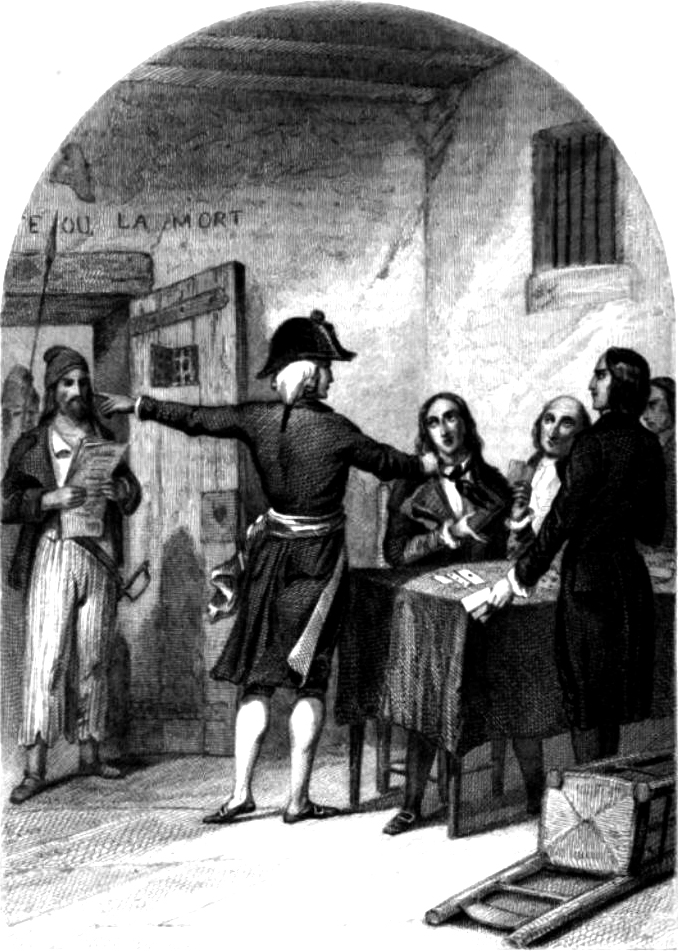
The Girondins in the La Force Prison after their arrest, a woodcut from 1845

Girondins at first dominated the Jacobin Club, where Brissot's influence had not yet been ousted by Maximilien Robespierre and they did not hesitate to use this advantage to stir up popular passion and intimidate those who sought to stay the progress of the Revolution. They compelled the king in 1792 to choose a ministry composed of their partisans, among them Roland, Charles François Dumouriez, Étienne Clavière and Joseph Marie Servan de Gerbey; and they forced a declaration of war against Habsburg Austria the same year. Following the veto of key pieces of legislation proposed by the Girondins (primarily relating to the deportation of refractory priests and the stationing of 20,000 soldiers in Paris) by the King and a critical letter penned by Roland in response to these vetoes, Louis XVI dismissed the Girondin Ministers on 13 June 1792. This dismissal is one of the factors that led to the émeute (riot) of 20 June 1792 as one of the aims of the rioters was for the King to reinstate the Girondist ministers.

In all of this activity, there was no apparent line of cleavage between La Gironde and The Mountain. Montagnards and Girondins alike were fundamentally opposed to the monarchy; both were democrats as well as republicans; and both were prepared to appeal to force in order to realise their ideals. Despite being accused of wanting to weaken the central government ("federalism"), the Girondins desired as little as the Montagnards to break up the unity of France. From the first, the leaders of the two parties stood in avowed opposition, in the Jacobin Club as in the Assembly.

Temperament largely accounts for the dividing line between the parties. The Girondins were doctrinaires and theorists rather than men of action. They initially encouraged armed petitions, but then were dismayed when this led to the émeute (riot) of 20 June 1792. Jean-Marie Roland was typical of their spirit, turning the Ministry of the Exterior into a publishing office for tracts on civic virtues while riotous mobs were burning the châteaux unchecked in the provinces. Girondins did not share the ferocious fanaticism or the ruthless opportunism of the future Montagnard organisers of the Reign of Terror. On 25 July, according to the Logographe, Carnot promoted the use of pikes (seven feet long) and provided to every citizen. (On this day the points of view between Robespierre and Brissot split.) On 29 July Robespierre called for the deposition of the King and the election of a Convention. Early August Brissot urged the preservation of the constitution, advocating against both the dethronement of the king and the election of a new assembly. As the Revolution developed, the Girondins often found themselves opposing its results; the overthrow of the monarchy on 10 August 1792 and the September Massacres of 1792 occurred while they still nominally controlled the government, but the Girondins tried to distance themselves from the results of the September Massacres. At the end of August Robespierre was no longer willing to cooperate with Brissot and Roland. On Sunday morning 2 September the members of the Commune, gathering in the town hall to proceed the election of deputies to the National Convention, decided to maintain their seats and have Roland and Brissot arrested. According to Charlotte Robespierre, her brother stopped talking to his former friend, mayor Pétion de Villeneuve. Pétion was accused of conspicuous consumption by Desmoulins, and finally rallied to Brissot.

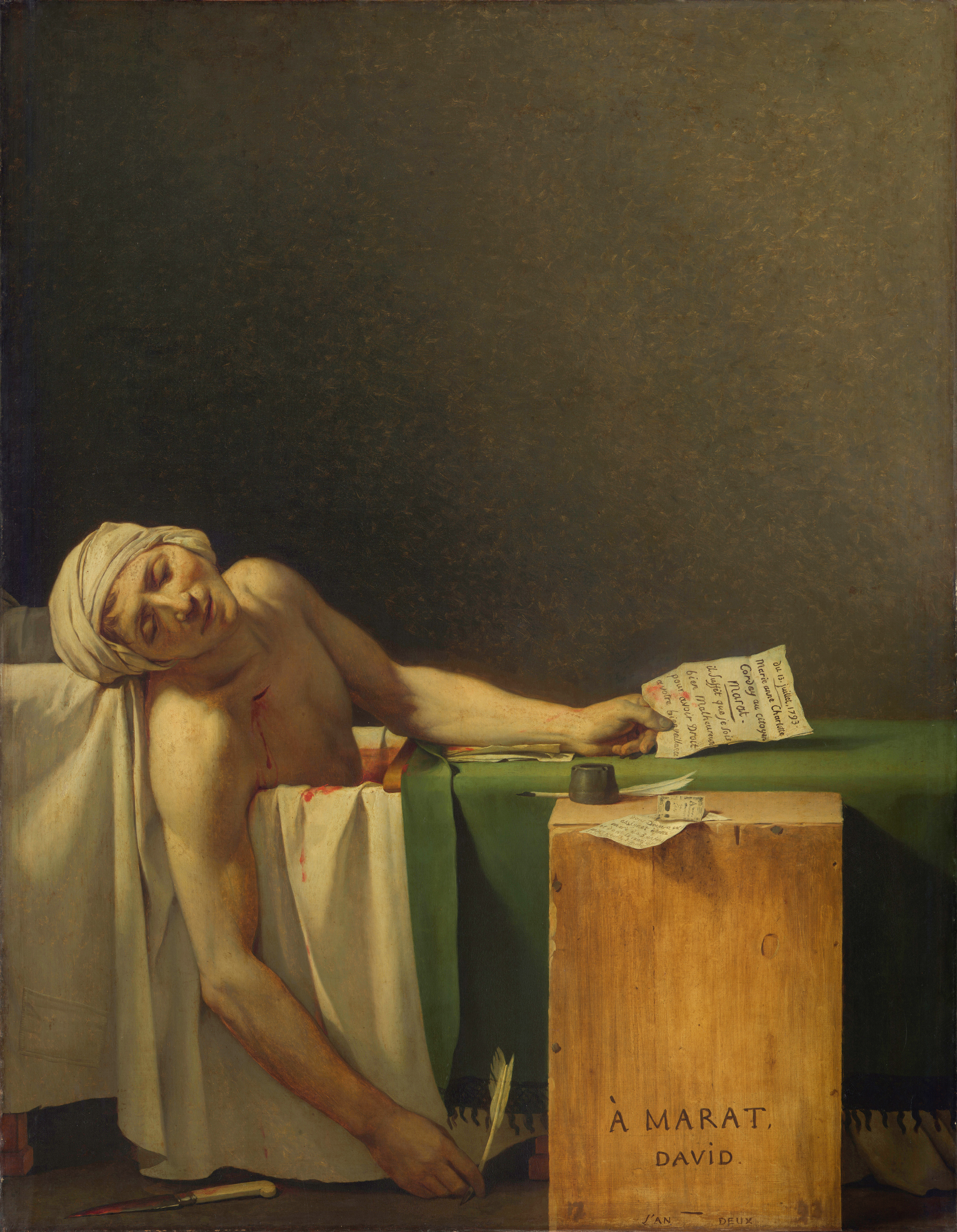
Death of Marat by Jacques-Louis David

When the National Convention first met on 22 September 1792, the core of like-minded deputies from the Gironde expanded as Jean-Baptiste Boyer-Fonfrède, Jacques Lacaze and François Bergoeing joined five of the six stalwarts of the Legislative Assembly (Jean Jay, the Protestant pastor, drifted toward the Montagnard faction). Their numbers were increased by the return to national politics by former National Constituent Assembly deputies such as Jean-Paul Rabaut Saint-Étienne, Pétion de Villeneuve and Kervélégan, as well as some newcomers as the writer Thomas Paine and popular journalist Jean-Louis Carra. The Girondins called on the local authorities to oppose the concentration and centralisation of power.

=== Decline and fall ===
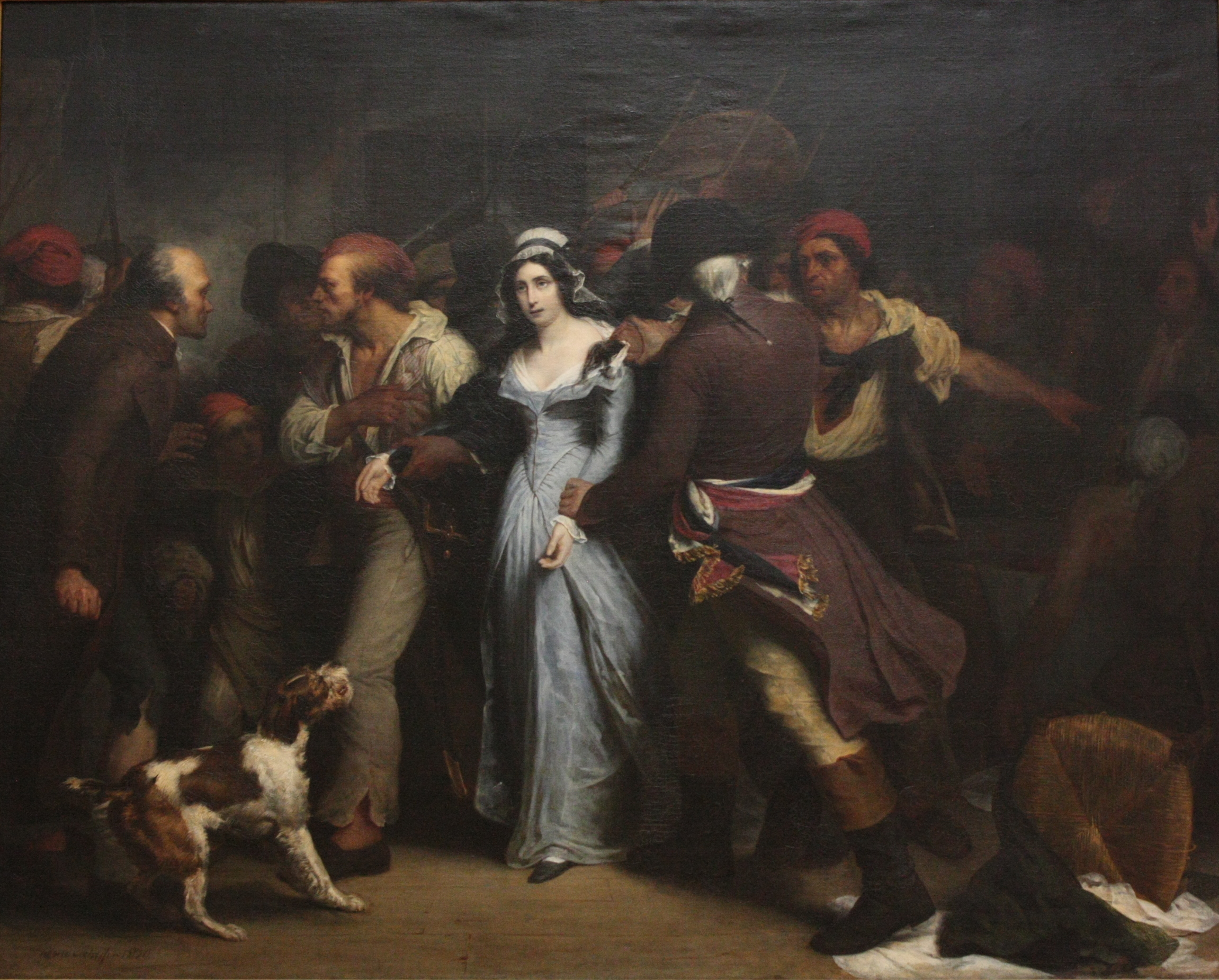
The Arrest of Charlotte Corday by Hendrik Scheffer, 1830

The Girondins proposed suspending the king and summoning of the National Convention, but they agreed not to overthrow the monarchy until Louis XVI became impervious to their counsels. Once the king was overthrown in 1792 and a republic was established, they were anxious to stop the revolutionary movement that they had helped to set in motion. Girondins and historian Pierre Claude François Daunou argues in his Mémoires that the Girondins were too cultivated and too polished to retain their popularity for long in times of disturbance, and so they were more inclined to work for the establishment of order, which would mean the guarantee of their own power. The Girondins, who had been the radicals of the Legislative Assembly (1791–1792), became the conservatives of the Convention (1792–1795).

The Revolution failed to deliver the immediate gains that had been promised and this made it difficult for the Girondins to draw it to a close easily in the minds of the public. Moreover, the Septembriseurs (the supporters of the September Massacres such as Robespierre, Danton, Marat and their lesser allies) realised that not only their influence but their safety depended on keeping the Revolution alive. Robespierre, who hated the Girondins, had proposed to include them in the proscription lists of September 1792: The Mountain Club to a man who desired their overthrow. A group including some Girondins prepared a draft constitution known as the Girondin constitutional project, which was presented to the National Convention in early 1793. Thomas Paine was one of the signatories of this proposal.

The crisis came in March 1793. The Girondins, who had a majority in the Convention, controlled the executive council and filled the ministries, believed themselves invincible. Their orators had no serious rivals in the hostile camp—their system was established in mere reason, but the Montagnards made up for what they lacked in talent or in numbers through their boldness and energy. This was especially fruitful since uncommitted delegates accounted for almost half the total number, even though the Jacobins and Brissotins formed the largest groups. The more radical rhetoric of the Jacobins attracted the support of the revolutionary Paris Commune, the Revolutionary Sections (mass assemblies in districts) and the National Guard of Paris and they had gained control of the Jacobin club, where Brissot, absorbed in departmental work, had been superseded by Robespierre. At the trial of Louis XVI in 1792, most Girondins had voted for the "appeal to the people" and so laid themselves open to the charge of "royalism". They denounced the domination of Paris and summoned provincial levies to their aid and so fell under suspicion of "federalism" as on September 25, 1792. They strengthened the revolutionary Commune by first decreeing its abolition but withdrawing the decree at the first sign of popular opposition.

In the suspicious temper of the times, their vacillation was fatal. Marat never ceased his denunciations of the faction by which France was being betrayed to her ruin and his cry of Nous sommes trahis! ("We are betrayed!") was echoed from group to group in the streets of Paris. The growing hostility of Paris to the Girondins received a fateful demonstration by the election on 15 February 1793 of the bitter ex-Girondin Jean-Nicolas Pache to the mayoralty. Pache had twice been minister of war in the Girondins government, but his incompetence had laid him open to strong criticism and on 4 February 1793 he had been replaced as minister of war by a vote of the Convention. This was enough to secure him the votes of the Paris electors when he was elected mayor ten days later. The Mountain was strengthened by the accession of a significant ally whose one idea was to use his new power to avenge himself on his former colleagues. Mayor Pache, with procureur of the Commune Pierre Gaspard Chaumette and deputy procureur Jacques René Hébert, controlled the armed militias of the 48 revolutionary Sections of Paris and prepared to turn this weapon against the Convention. The abortive émeute of 10 March warned the Girondins of their danger and they responded with defensive moves. They unintentionally increased the prestige of their most vocal and bitter critic Marat by prosecuting him before the Revolutionary Tribunal, where his acquittal in April 1793 was a foregone conclusion. The Commission of Twelve was appointed of on 24 May, including the arrest of Varlat and Hébert and other precautionary measures. The ominous threat by Girondin leader Maximin Isnard, uttered on 25 May, to "march France upon Paris" was instead met by Paris marching hastily upon the Convention. The Girondin role in the government was undermined by the popular uprisings of 27 and 31 May and finally on 2 June 1793, when François Hanriot, head of the Paris National Guards, purged the Convention of the Girondins (see Insurrection of 31 May – 2 June 1793).

=== Reign of Terror ===
A list drawn up by the Commandant-General of the Parisian National Guard François Hanriot (with help from Marat) and endorsed by a decree of the intimidated Convention, included 22 Girondin deputies and 10 of the 12 members of the Commission of Twelve, who were ordered to be detained at their lodgings "under the safeguard of the people". Some submitted, among them Gensonné, Guadet, Vergniaud, Pétion, Birotteau and Boyer-Fonfrède. Others, including Brissot, Louvet, Buzot, Lasource, Grangeneuve, Larivière and François Bergoeing, escaped from Paris and, joined later by Guadet, Pétion and Birotteau, set to work to organise a movement of the provinces against the capital. This attempt to stir up civil war made the wavering and frightened Convention suddenly determined. On 13 June 1793, it voted that the city of Paris deserved well of the country and ordered the imprisonment of the detained deputies, the filling up of their places in the Assembly by their suppléants and the initiation of vigorous measures against the movement in the provinces. The assassination of Marat by Charlotte Corday on 13 July 1793 only served to increase the unpopularity of the Girondins and seal their fate.

The excuse for the Terror that followed was the imminent peril of France, menaced on the east by the advance of the armies of the First Coalition (Austria, Prussia and Great Britain) on the west by the Royalist Revolt in the Vendée and the need for preventing at all costs the outbreak of another civil war. On 28 July 1793, a decree of the Convention proscribed 21 deputies, five of whom were from the Gironde, as traitors and enemies of their country (Charles-Louis Antiboul, Boilleau the younger, Boyer-Fonfrêde, Brissot, Carra, Gaspard-Séverin Duchastel, the younger Ducos, Dufriche de Valazé, Jean Duprat, Fauchet, Gardien, Gensonné, Lacaze, Lasource, Claude Romain Lauze de Perret, Lehardi, Benoît Lesterpt-Beauvais, the elder Minvielle, the Marquis de Sillery, Vergniaud and Louis-François-Sébastien Viger). Those were sent to trial. Another 39 were included in the final acte d'accusation, accepted by the Convention on 24 October 1793, which stated the crimes for which they were to be tried as their perfidious ambition, their hatred of Paris, their "federalism" and above all their responsibility for the attempt of their escaped colleagues to provoke civil war.

=== 1793 trial of Girondins ===
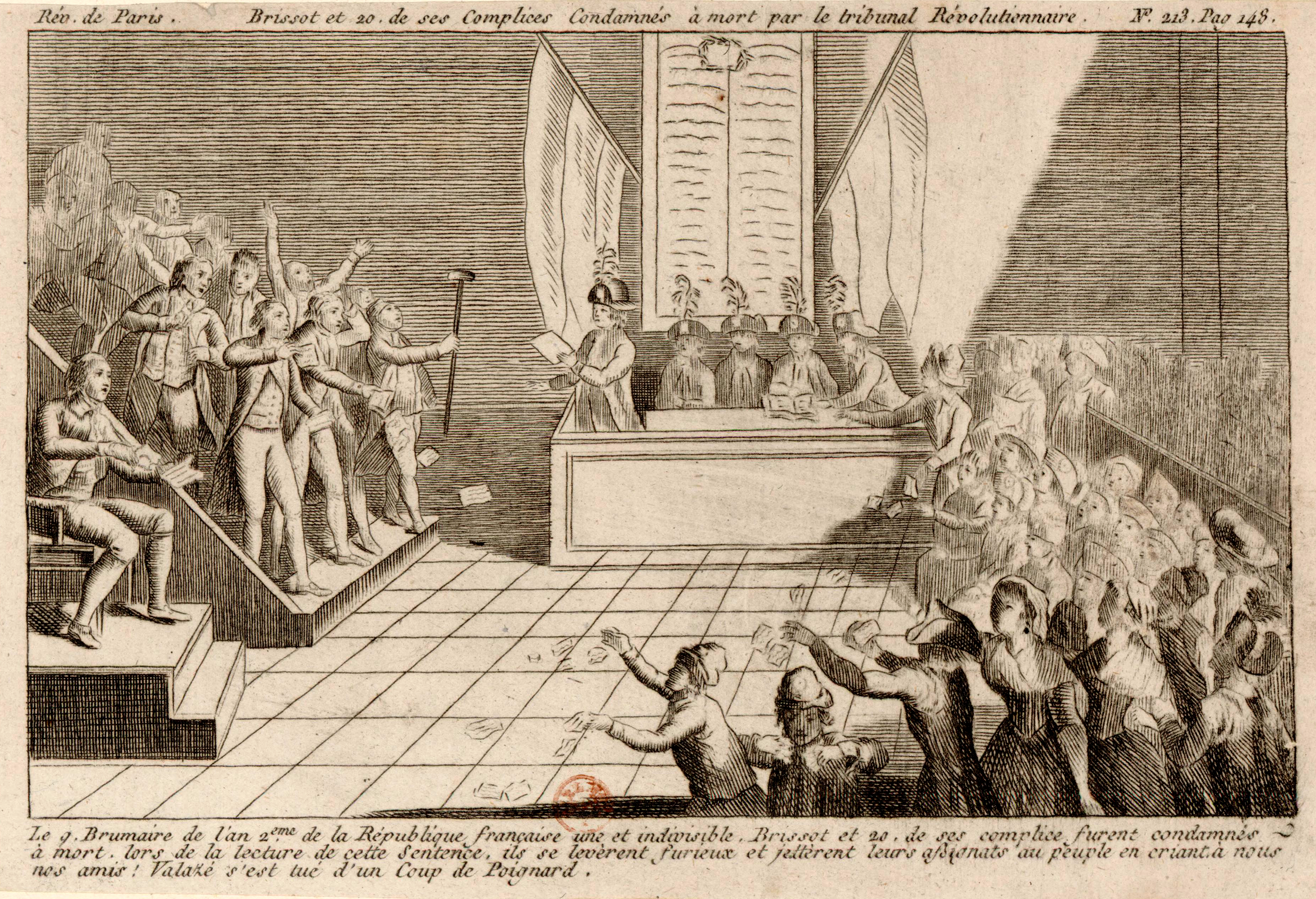
Brissot et 20 de ses complices condamnés à mort par le tribunal révolutionnaire (Brissot and 20 of his accomplices are sentenced to death by the Revolutionary Tribunal)

The trial of the 22 began before the Revolutionary Tribunal on 24 October 1793. The verdict was a foregone conclusion. On 31 October, they were borne to the guillotine. It took 36 minutes to decapitate all of them, including Charles Éléonor Dufriche-Valazé, who had committed suicide the previous day upon hearing the sentence he was given.

Of those who escaped to the provinces, after wandering about singly or in groups most were either captured and executed or committed suicide. They included Barbaroux, Buzot, Condorcet, Grangeneuve, Guadet, Kersaint, Pétion, Rabaut de Saint-Etienne and François Rebecqui. Roland killed himself at Rouen on 15 November 1793, a week after the execution of his wife. A very few escaped, including Jean-Baptiste Louvet de Couvrai, whose Mémoires give a detailed picture of the sufferings of the fugitives.

Marie-Thérèse Marinette Dupeyrat, also known as Madame Bouquey, sister in law of Marguerite-Élie Guadet was executed by guillotine on 20 July 1794 for her roles in sheltering a number of the Girondins.

=== Girondins as martyrs ===
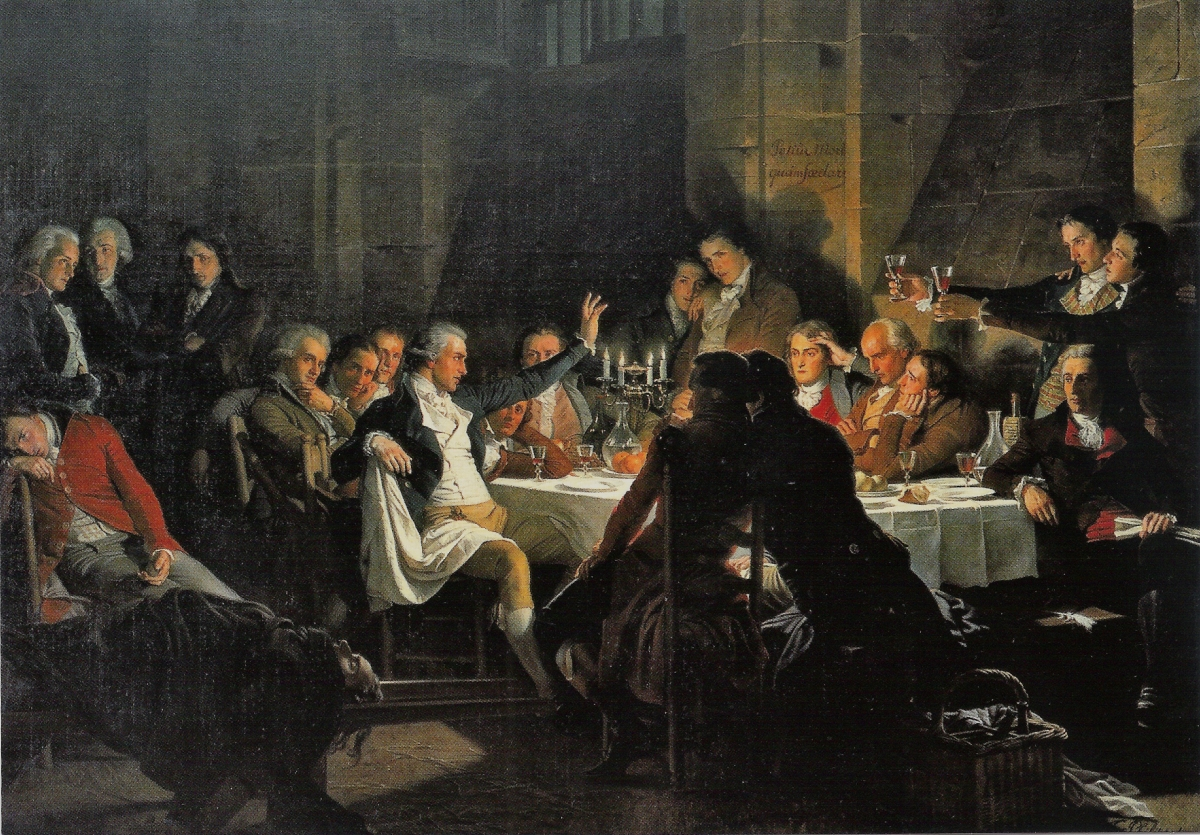
The Last Banquet of the Girondins by Henri Félix Emmanuel Philippoteaux, 1850. The body of Charles Éléonor Dufriche-Valazé, who stabbed himself in the courtroom, is in the foreground.

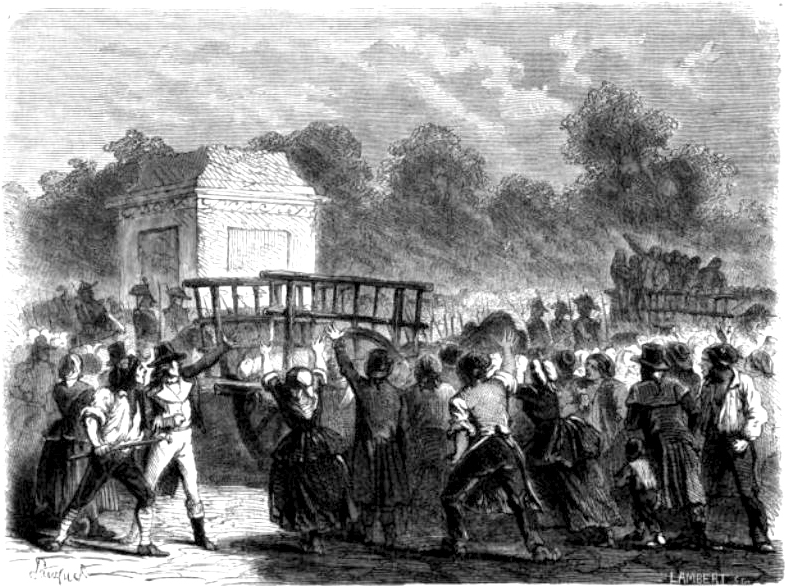
Execution of the Girondins, woodcut from 1862

On 8 December 1794 (18 Frimaire Year III), the National Convention recalled the deputies known as the "73", who had protested against the exclusion of the Girondin deputies in June 1793. A second decree, passed on 8 March 1795 (18 Ventôse Year III), allowed Girondin deputies who were still excluded to resume their seats. On 3 October 1795 (11 Vendémiaire Year IV), the Convention held a memorial ceremony in honour of the Girondins who had perished.

In her autobiography, Madame Roland reshapes her historical image by stressing the popular connection between sacrifice and female virtue. Her Mémoires de Madame Roland (1795) was written from prison where she was held as a Girondin sympathizer. It covers her work for the Girondins while her husband Jean-Marie Roland was Interior Minister. The book echoes such popular novels as Rousseau's Julie or the New Héloise by linking her feminine virtue and motherhood to her sacrifice in a cycle of suffering and consolation. Roland says her mother's death was the impetus for her "odyssey from virtuous daughter to revolutionary heroine" as it introduced her to death and sacrifice—with the ultimate sacrifice of her own life for her political beliefs. She helped her husband escape, but she was executed on 8 November 1793. A week later he committed suicide.

A monument to the Girondins was erected in Bordeaux between 1893 and 1902 dedicated to the memory of the Girondin deputies who were victims of the Terror. The vagueness of who actually made up the Girondins led to the monument not having any names inscribed on it until 1989. Even then, the deputies to the Convention who were memorialized were only those hailing from the Gironde department, omitting notable people like Brissot and Madame Roland.

== Ideology ==
The words Girondin and Montagnard are defined as political groups—more specific definitions are the subject of theorizing by historians. The two words were much tossed about by partisans with various understandings of what they were intended to represent. The two groups lacked formal political structures, and the differences between them have never been satisfactorily explained. It has been suggested that the word Girondin as a useful term be abandoned.

Influenced by classical liberalism and the concepts of freedom, liberty, equality, brotherhood, democracy, human rights, rule of law and Montesquieu's separation of powers, the Girondins were republicans. Like the Jacobins, they were also influenced by the writings of David Hume, Edward Gibbon, Voltaire and Jean-Jacques Rousseau.

In its early times of government, the Gironde supported a free market, opposing price controls on goods (e.g., a 1793 maximum on grain prices), supported by a constitutional right to public assistance for the poor and public education. With Brissot, they advocated exporting the Revolution through aggressive foreign policies including war against the surrounding European monarchies. The Girondins were also one of the first supporters of abolitionism in France with Brissot leading the anti-slavery Society of the Friends of the Blacks. Certain Girondins such as Condorcet supported women's suffrage and political equality.

They sat to the left of the centrist Feuillants. The Girondins supported democratic reform, secularism and parliamentary sovereignty at the expense of a weaker executive and judiciary, in contrast to the more radical Montagnards, who drew support from the sans-culottes, favored centralized emergency government through the Committee of Public Safety, enacted coercive economic measures such as the Maximum, and oversaw the policies of surveillance and repression that marked the Reign of Terror.

== Prominent members ==
- Jacques Pierre Brissot (leader)
- Jean-Marie Roland
- Madame Roland
- Maximin Isnard
- Jacques Guillaume Thouret
- Jean Baptiste Treilhard
- Pierre Victurnien Vergniaud
- Armand Gensonné
- Marquis de Condorcet
- Pierre Claude François Daunou
- Marguerite-Élie Guadet
- Jacques Claude Beugnot
- Louis Gustave le Doulcet
- Claude Fauchet
- François Buzot
- Charles Jean Marie Barbaroux
- François Aubry
- Charles-Louis Antiboul
- Léger-Félicité Sonthonax
- Jérôme Pétion

== Electoral results ==
National Convention
Election year	No. of overall votes	% of overall vote	No. of overall seats won	+/–	Leader
1792	705,600 (3rd)	21.4	160 / 749	–	Jacques Pierre Brissot

== In popular culture ==
In the 2015 video game Assassin's Creed Unity, the Girondins play a central role in one mission in particular, 'Political Persecution'. The player (represented by the main character Arno) and possibly other assassins are tasked with warning and smuggling several Girondins out of Paris before they could be arrested by François Hanriot. The mission ends with the Assassins smuggling the Girondins out of the city, saving their lives. During the mission, the player is tasked with signalling the group to begin evacuating by lighting two pyres on top of the Bastille. Since the Bastille was demolished in 1790, this is historically impossible, but it was included for gameplay, since the main game spans 1789-1794.

== See also ==
- Historiography of the French Revolution
- Liberalism and radicalism in France
