= Pierre Victurnien Vergniaud =

18th-century French politician

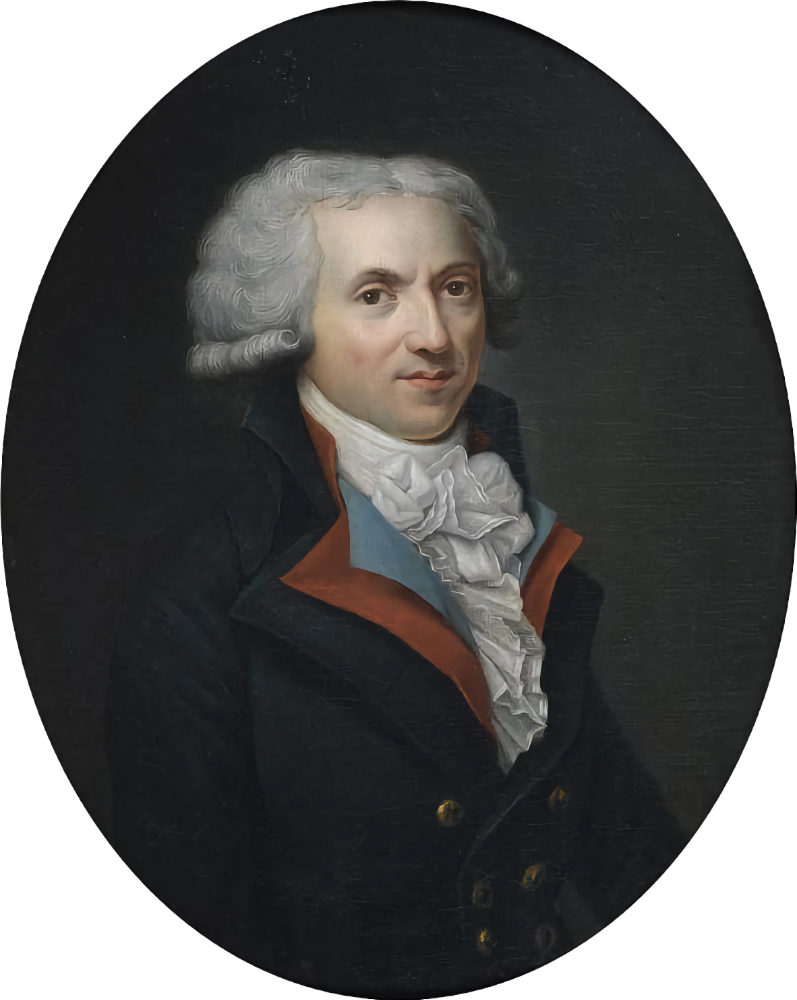
- Portrait attributed to Adélaïde Labille-Guiard c. 1792

9th President of the National Convention
- In office 10–24 January 1793
- Preceded by: Jean-Baptiste Treilhard
- Succeeded by: Jean-Paul Rabaut Saint-Étienne

Personal details
- Born: 31 May 1753 Limoges, France
- Died: 31 October 1793 (aged 40) Paris, France
- Cause of death: Execution by Guillotine
- Party: Girondins
- Education: Collège du Plessis
- Occupation: Lawyer

Pierre Victurnien Vergniaud (French pronunciation: [pjɛʁ viktyʁnjɛ̃ vɛʁɲo]; 31 May 1753 – 31 October 1793) was a French lawyer and statesman, a figure of the French Revolution. A deputy to the Assembly from Bordeaux, Vergniaud was an eloquent orator. He was a supporter of Jacques Pierre Brissot and the Girondist faction.

== Early life and education ==
Vergniaud was born in the city of Limoges in the province of Limousin, to the elder Pierre Vergniaud and his wife Catherine Baubiat. The Vergniauds had both come from well-to-do merchant families with a long history in the province, and the family enjoyed a comfortable prosperity. At the time of Vergniaud's birth, his father was a contractor and purveyor for the king, supplying food for the royal garrison in the city.

The younger Vergniaud was first tutored at home by a Jesuit scholar, Abbé Roby, a master of ancient languages: it is likely that Vergniaud's lifelong love of the classics was inspired by him. The boy was sent to the Jesuit college at Limoges where he excelled. The future French statesman Turgot was at that time the intendant of the province and knew the elder Vergniaud well. On one occasion, young Pierre recited some of his own poetry in the presence of Turgot, who was greatly impressed by his talent. Through Turgot's patronage, Vergniaud was admitted to the Collège du Plessis in Paris. Little is known of Vergniaud's personal life during his time at Du Plessis, but his education there was clearly a major formative experience: his deep, personal absorption of classical history and philosophy is evident throughout his later life.

After his studies were complete, Vergniaud went unsure of his direction in life. He drifted lazily through several years, dabbling in fiction and theater, and losing his short career as a clerk in the provincial revenue office. Much to his father's dismay, his chief preoccupation became frequenting salons and engaging in conversation, but in these pursuits Vergniaud excelled magnificently: important new friendships and associations grew richly for him in the salons. He was particularly favored by the Countess de Maleyssie, who let the frequently destitute Vergniaud live freely in her estate, and Charles Dupaty, President of the parlement of Bordeaux, who urged him to study law.

== Attorney-at-law ==
=== Durieux Affair ===
Years of successful advocacy followed, and Vergniaud's eloquence was frequently met with loud bursts of applause in the courtroom. In 1790 he took on the defense of Pierre Durieux, a National Guardsman of Brive who had been imprisoned and sentenced to death for having incited a riot. The Durieux affair arose from the boisterous celebrations of revolutionary peasants in the small village near Brive called Allassac. Incensed members of the local aristocracy had attempted to quell the indecorum by firing shots in the air; met with rocks and stones, they turned their guns on the crowd and killed several peasants. When Durieux's unit arrived to restore order, the soldier found himself repelled by his duty, and according to the charges he urged the rioters to fight back. Durieux was not alone: many Guardsmen were arrested and two were swiftly condemned to death. While Durieux languished in jail awaiting his turn, the news spread and sparked the furious interest of revolutionaries all around the nation. Vergniaud had already been greatly moved by revolutionary rhetoric, and was an enthusiastic supporter of the reforms which had caused the initial celebrations at Allassac. As Durieux's lawyer, Vergniaud entered his first truly political case.

The trial began in February 1791 before a packed courtroom. Vergniaud's case was built on the fact that his client had not actually committed any offense: could he be hanged, Vergniaud asked, just for something he said in a moment of righteous anger? He reminded the court of similarly imprudent remarks that had recently been made in the National Assembly itself: "One of its members... speaking of those to whom the people owe their liberty [said], 'One must fall upon these people saber in hand.' Have you asked for a scaffold to be raised for him?" With rising drama, he repeated the question four times to the hushed courtroom. In a long and incandescent speech, he widened his defense of Durieux to include the whole of the peasant crowd: "They trod in indignation the soil which they so long had watered with their sweat and tears. Their eyes turned with the somber disquiet of resentment to the superb château where they had so often gone to lower themselves by shameful homage, and from which, more than once, the caprices of pride... had spread like devastating torrents." Vergniaud's oration put the entire Revolution on trial, and, like Durieux, it was exonerated completely. Revolutionaries printed copies of his defense and circulated them throughout France. Vergniaud had delivered one of the great speeches of his life, and now the provincial lawyer would be coaxed from all quarters to join the revolution at the national level.

== In the Legislative Assembly ==
In 1789 Vergniaud had been elected a member of the general council of the département of the Gironde. After the Durieux affair, he was chosen to be a representative to the Legislative Assembly and he proceeded to Paris in August 1791. The Assembly met on 1 October, and for a time Vergniaud refrained from speaking publicly. Soon after his first speech on October 25, however, he was elected president of the Assembly, for the usual brief term. Between the outbreak of the Revolution and his election to the Legislative Assembly, Vergniaud's political views had undergone a decided change. At first he had supported the idea of a constitutional monarchy, but the flight of King Louis XVI made him distrust the sovereign, and he began to favour a republic.

The sentiments and passions that his eloquence aroused were made use of by a more extreme party. Even his first Assembly speech, on the émigrés, proposing for a treble annual contribution be levied on their property, resulted in a measure passed by the Assembly, but vetoed by the king, mandating the death sentence and confiscation of their goods. Step by step, he was led on to tolerate violence and crime, the excesses of which he realised only by the September Massacres, which ultimately overwhelmed the party of Girondists that he led.

On 19 March 1792, when the perpetrators of the massacre of Avignon had been introduced to the Assembly by Collot d'Herbois, Vergniaud spoke indulgently of their crimes and lent the authority of his voice to their amnesty.

He worked at the theme of the émigrés, as it developed into that of the counter-revolution, and in his occasional appearances in the tribune as well as in the project of an address to the French people, which he presented to the Assembly on 27 December 1791, he stirred the heart of France, especially by his call to arms on 18 January, shaped the policy, which culminated in the declaration of war against the king of Bohemia and Hungary on 20 April.

The policy in foreign affairs, which he pursued through the winter and spring of 1791–92, he combined with arousing the suspicions of the people against the monarchy, which he identified with the counter-revolution, and of forcing a change of ministry. On 10 March, Vergniaud delivered a powerful oration in which he denounced the intrigues of the court and uttered his famous apostrophe to the Tuileries: "In ancient times fear and terror have often issued from that famous palace; let them re-enter it to-day in the name of the law!"

The speech overthrew Claude Antoine Valdec de Lessart, whose accusation was decreed, and Jean Marie Roland, the nominee of the Girondists, entered the ministry. By June the opposition of Vergniaud (whose voice still commanded the country) to the king rose to fever pitch. On 29 May Vergniaud went so far as to support the disbanding of the king's guard, yet he appears to have been unaware of the extent of the feelings of animosity which he had aroused in the people, probably because he was wholly unconnected with the practices of the party of the Mountain as the instigators of the violence. The party used Vergniaud, whose lofty and serene ideas they travestied in action. Then came the riot of 20 June and the invasion of the Tuileries.

He was powerless to quell the riot. Continuing for yet a little longer his course of almost frenzied opposition to the throne, on 3 July he boldly denounced the king as a hypocrite, a despot and a base traitor to the constitution. His speeches were perhaps the greatest single factor in the development of the events of the time.

On 10 August, the Tuileries was stormed, and the royal family took refuge in the Assembly. Vergniaud presided, replying to the request of the king for protection in dignified and respectful language. An extraordinary commission was appointed: Vergniaud wrote and read its recommendations for National Convention to be formed, the king be provisionally suspended from office, a governor appointed for his son, and the royal family be consigned to the Palais Luxembourg. Hardly had the great orator attained the object of his aim, the overthrow of Louis as a sovereign, when he became conscious of the forces by which he was surrounded. He denounced the massacres of September, their inception, their horror and the future to which they pointed, in language so vivid and powerful that it raised for a time the spirits of the Girondists, but on the other hand, it aroused the fatal opposition of the Parisian leaders.

The question of whether Louis XVI should be judged and, if so, by whom was the subject of protracted debate. The Girondist leader at last, on 31 December 1792, broke silence, delivering one of his greatest speeches. He pronounced in favour of an appeal to the people. The great effort failed, and four days afterwards, Vergniaud and his whole party were further damaged by the discovery of a note signed by him along with Gaudet and Armand Gensonné and presented to the king two or three weeks before 10 August. It was greedily seized on by the enemies of the Girondists as evidence of treason.

On 16 January 1793 a vote was taken in the Convention upon the punishment of the king. Vergniaud voted early and for death. The action of the great Girondist was followed by a similar verdict from nearly the whole party which he led. On the 17th, Vergniaud presided at the Convention, and it fell to him, labouring under the most painful excitement, to announce the fatal result of the voting. Then, for many weeks he remained silent. He participated to the Constitution Committee that drafted the Girondin constitutional project.

== Proscription of the Girondists ==
When the institution of a revolutionary tribunal was proposed, Vergniaud opposed the project, denouncing the tribunal as a more awful inquisition than that of Spain, and avowing that his party would all die rather than consent to it. Their death by stratagem had already been planned, and on 10 March they had to go into hiding. On the 13th Vergniaud boldly exposed the conspiracy in the Convention. The antagonism caused by such an attitude had reached a significant point when on 10 April Robespierre himself laid his accusation before the Convention. He fastened on Vergniaud's letter to the king and his support of the appeal to the people as proof that he was a moderate in its then despised sense. Vergniaud made a brilliant extemporaneous reply, and the attack for the moment failed. But now, night after night, Vergniaud and his colleagues found themselves obliged to change their abode, to avoid assassination, a price being even put upon their heads. Still with unfaltering courage they continued their resistance to the dominant faction, till things came to a head on 2 June 1793. The Convention was surrounded with an armed mob, who clamoured for the "twenty-two." In the midst of this it was forced to continue its deliberations. The decree of accusation was voted, and the Girondists were proscribed. Vergniaud is noted for his last gesture of defiance in standing up among the subdued deputies and offering them a glass of blood to slake their thirst, a metaphor for their betrayal of the Girondins.

Vergniaud took refuge for a day, then returned to his own home. He was kept under surveillance there for nearly a month, and in the early days of July was imprisoned in La Force Prison. He carried poison with him, but never used it. His tender affection for his relatives abundantly appears from his correspondence, along with his profound attachment to the great ideas of the Revolution and his noble love of country. On one of the walls of the Carmelite convent to which for a short time the prisoners were removed Vergniaud wrote in letters of blood: Potius mori quam foedari—Death before dishonor. Early in October the Convention brought forward its indictment of the twenty-two Girondists. They were sent for trial to the Revolutionary tribunal, before which they appeared on 27 October. The procedure has been referred to as a travesty of justice. Vergniaud's moving oratory and persuasive lawyering upset the court's plans for a quick trial, but the predetermined verdicts were handed down anyway. Early on the morning of 31 October 1793 the Girondists were conveyed to the scaffold, singing on the way the Marseillaise and keeping up the strain till one by one they were guillotined. Vergniaud was executed last and buried in the Madeleine Cemetery.
