= François Buzot =

French politician (1760–1794)

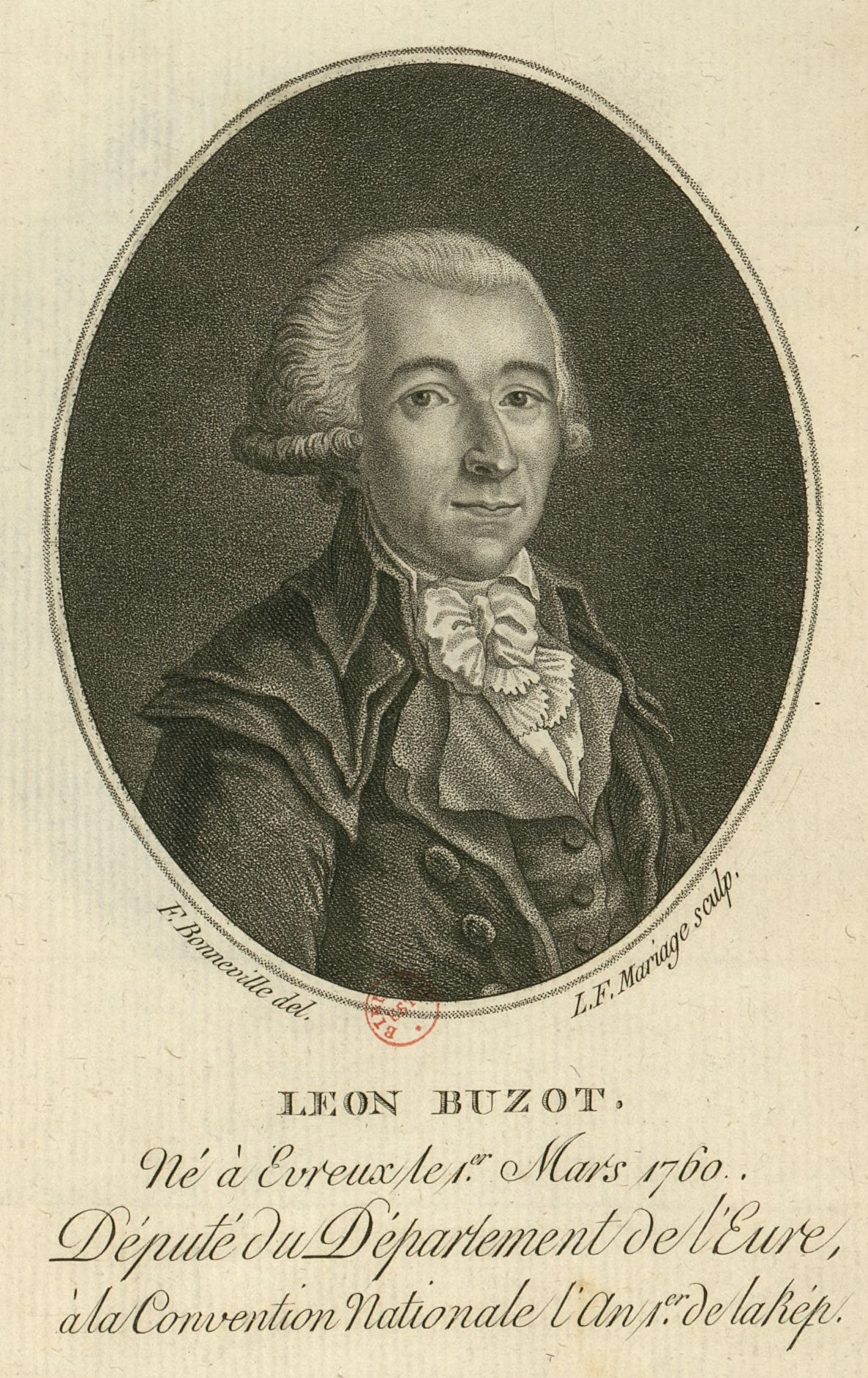
- Born: François Buzot; 1 March 1760; Évreux, France
- Died: 24 June 1794 (aged 34); Saint-Émilion, France
- Cause of death: Suicide
- Known for: French politician and leader of the French Revolution

François Nicolas Léonard Buzot (French pronunciation: [fʁɑ̃swa nikɔla leɔnaʁ byzo]; 1 March 1760 – 24 June 1794) was a French politician and leader of the French Revolution.

== Biography ==
=== Early life ===
Born at Évreux, Eure, Buzot studied Law, and, at the outbreak of the Revolution was a lawyer in his home town. In 1789, he was elected a deputy of the Third Estate to the Estates-General, and became known there for his radical opinions. He demanded the nationalization of the possessions of the Roman Catholic Church, and the right of all citizens to bear arms.

After the dissolution of the National Constituent Assembly, Buzot returned to Évreux, where he was named president of the criminal tribunal.

=== Convention ===
In 1792, Buzot was elected deputy to the National Convention, and joined the Girondists under the influence of his friend Madame Roland. Buzot entered a polemic with the main rival of the Girondists, Jean-Paul Marat, and demanded the formation of a National Guard from the départements to defend the Convention against the Paris crowds of sans-culottes. His proposal was carried, but never put into force - the Parisians subsequently singled him out as a target of their hatred.

In the trial of King Louis XVI, Buzot voted in favour of the capital punishment death, but with appeal to the people and postponement of sentence (sursis). He had a sentence of death passed against the Royalist émigrés who did not return to France, and against anyone who should demand the re-establishment of the monarchy. At the same time, he opposed Georges Danton and The Mountain, and rejected the creation of a Committee of Public Safety and Revolutionary Tribunal (but abstained when the question of Marat's trial before the Tribunal was brought up by the Girondists). On 5 May 1793, his servant was arrested in the Jardin du Luxembourg.

=== Flight and resistance ===
Proscribed with the Girondists on 2 June 1793, Buzot escaped, and took refuge to Calvados in Normandy, where he contributed to organize a Girondist insurrection against the convention, which was suppressed soon after.

The Convention prosecuted him, and decreed "that the house occupied by Buzot be demolished, and never to be rebuilt on this plot. [Instead,] a column shall be raised, on which there shall be written: "Here was the sanctuary of the villain Buzot who, while a representative of the people, conspired for the overthrow of the French Republic"". He fled, together with Jérôme Pétion de Villeneuve, to Saint-Émilion, near Bordeaux and remained in hiding. Both of them most likely committed suicide; their bodies were found in a field a week later, half-eaten by dogs. It is unclear whether the men used poison or shot themselves with a pistol, which is likely due to the decomposed state in which their bodies were found.

Buzot's house in Evreux was purposefully burnt to the ground, plus an effigy of Buzot, by a crowd on 27 July 1793.

Buzot left behind his Memoirs, first published in 1823.
