= Charles-Louis Antiboul =

French politician

Charles-Louis Antiboul (French pronunciation: [ʃaʁl lwi ɑ̃tibul]; 20 May 1752, Saint-Tropez – 31 October 1793) was a French Girondist politician. He was a member of the National Convention from 1792 to 1793. On 7 September 1793 he was ordered to be arrested. On 30 October 1793 he was sentenced to death by the Revolutionary Tribunal and executed the following day.
