= Marie-Thérèse Marinette Dupeyrat =

French revolutionary (1762–1794)

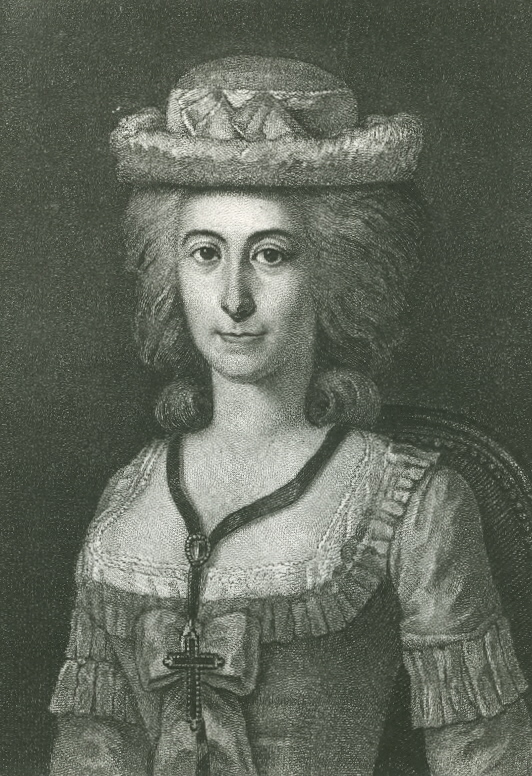
- Dupeyrat's portrait, engraved from a work by Yvon
- Born: 1762
- Died: 1794 (aged 31–32)

Marie-Thérèse Marinette Dupeyrat (1762 – 20 July 1794) also known as Madame Bouquey was a French revolutionary. She was executed by guillotine after sheltering escaping Girondins.
