= Girondin constitutional project =

The Girondin constitutional project, presented to the French National Convention on 15 and 16 February 1793 by Nicolas de Caritat, formerly the Marquis de Condorcet, is composed of three parts:

- An Exposition of the Principles and Motives of the Constitutional Scheme, approx. 80 pages
- A Draft Declaration of the Natural, Civil, and Political Rights of Man, in 33 articles
- A Draft French Constitution, in 13 titles

The work was signed by the eight members of the Convention's Constitution Committee: Condorcet, Gensonné, Barrère, Barbaroux, Paine, Pétion, Vergniaud and Sieyès.

== Principles and motives ==
In the exposition of the principles and motives behind the constitutional scheme that he reads before the National Convention, Condorcet begins, as a true mathematician, by a description of the "problem to solve":

To give to a territory of twenty-seven thousand square leagues, inhabited by twenty-five million individuals, a constitution which, being founded solely on the principles of reason and justice, insures to citizens the fullest enjoyment of their rights; to combine the parts of this constitution, so that the necessity of obedience to the laws, the submission of individual wills to the general will, allow the subsistence in all their extent, of the sovereignty of the people, equality among citizens, and the exercise of natural liberty, such is the problem that we had to solve.

Are subsequently exposed, in this order:

- the philosophical justifications for the abolition of monarchy;
- the motives to prefer the unity and indivisibility of the republic to the establishment of a confederal or federal order;
- an argumentation in favour of a constitution authorizing the representatives to make only laws that are submitted 1) to the limits of a constitutional law they cannot change; 2) to the direct censorship of the people, who remains the sole depository of sovereignty;
- primary assemblies: their functions (elections, petitions, censorship of laws, approving/rejecting the summoning of a national convention, or a constitution draft, or a proposition emanating from the legislative body), their relation with the assembly of national representation;
- the reasons to prefer, for the delegation of the people's powers, a unique principle of action to multiple and independent principles of action kept in balance by their concurrence;
- the reasons to prefer a unicameral constitution, the means to protect oneself against the dangers of laws adopted hastily;
- The reasons to prefer a small executive council to a single individual; the composition, the renewal and the functioning of the council; its subordination to the legislative power which nevertheless cannot dismiss its members;
- the independence of the public treasury vis-à-vis the executive council; the account juries;
- the administrative division of the territory into large communes;
- the administration of the departments; the subordination of the administrator to the executive council; their surveillance by the legislative body;
- the administration of justice; the trial by juries in civil affairs, only after the failure of arbitration;
- the institution of a national jury for judging functionaries in cases of offence against the liberty of the people or the safety of the State.
- the revision of rulings, their possible cassation attributed to censors;
- the abolition of death penalty for all offences involving private individuals;
- the same political rights to all men aged 21 and above, born in France or settled in France at least since one year; philosophical justifications; eligibility to all public places to citizens aged 25 and above;
- the electoral method inspired by the academic works on the "probability of majority decisions" done by Condorcet himself; two-turn preferential elections, at fixed dates, the first turn to form the list of candidates to be presented and who are definitively elected during the second turn;
- exterior relations and war;
- the revision of the constitution by way of a national convention independent from the legislative body;
- philosophical conclusion on the objectives of the constitution; summary of the principles and motives of its authors;

== Declaration of rights ==
The first article declares the natural, civil, and political rights of men which are liberty, equality, safety, property, social security, and resistance to oppression.

Articles 2 to 9 treat of liberty and equality and define these two terms.

Articles 10 to 22 treat of safety and property.

Article 23 declares a right to elementary instruction.

Article 24 treat of public relief.

Articles 25 to 30 treat of social security.

Articles 31 and 32 treat of resistance to oppression.

Article 33, the last one, declares the right of the people to review, reform and modify the constitution.

== Constitution ==
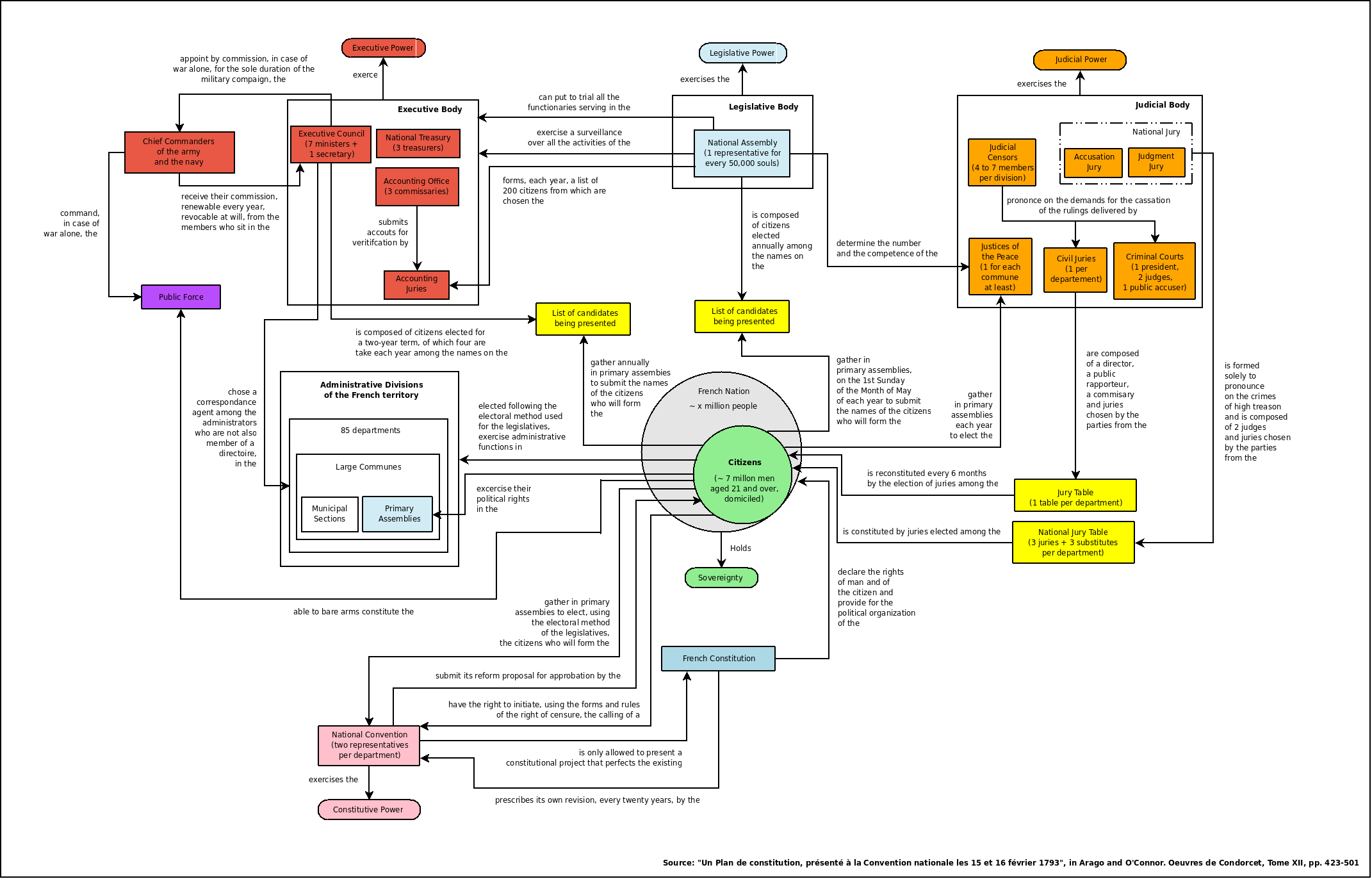
Draft Constitution of 1793

=== Territory ===
The territory of the French Republic keeps the preexisting 85 departments. The departments themselves are divided into large communes, which are in turn divided into municipal sections and primary assemblies.

=== Citizenship ===
The quality of citizen is granted to men 21 years old and older, following an uninterrupted residence of one year on French soil, counting from the day of their inscription on the civic table of a primary assembly. All public offices are open to citizens aged 25 years old and older.

In addition to the right to vote, citizens enjoy the right to petition, and the right to censure acts emanating from their representatives.

=== Administration ===
Each department is managed by an administrative council of 18 members, of which two form the directoire. The communes are led by a municipality administration made up of 12 members and a mayor, who chairs the administration. Communes including more than one section contain agencies subordinated to the municipality. Half of the members of the departments' administrative bodies are renewed every two years, three months after the date of the legislative elections. The mode of the municipal elections is not a constitutional law.

=== Electoral system ===
The citizens exert their right to vote in primary assemblies including between 450 and 900 members. Each primary assembly elects a bureau responsible for the citizenship registry, for summoning primary assemblies when the constitution prescribes it, and for examining ballot papers.

The elections comprise two polls: a first one used to prepare the list of candidates being presented, and a second one used for the election of the candidates on the list drawn up by the first election.

At the time of the first poll, voters receive from the bureau a ballot paper showing their name. On it they write (or have someone write for them in case of illiteracy) as many names as there are offices to elect, and drop their bulletin at the office. The list of presentation is formed from the names that received the most votes, and their number is triple that of the offices needing to be renewed. An equal number of substitutes is added from among those who obtained the most votes after the candidates. The candidates and substitutes have 15 days to desist, after which the list, sorted by the number of votes and without the remaining substitutes, becomes final.

At the time of the second poll, the voters receive a bulletin with two columns, one named "First Column of Election", the other "Additional Column", each one being divided into as many boxes as there are candidates to elect.

If a candidate receives a majority of the votes on the first column, he is immediately elected. If not, the votes of the two columns are added and those who obtain the majority in this way are elected. The others are elected by a plurality of the votes if not all offices have already been filled.

=== Executive ===
The executive would be made up of a council of eight members: seven ministers and a secretary. Legislation, war, foreign affairs, the navy, and public contributions would each have their own minister. A sixth minister would be responsible for agriculture, trade and manufactures and a seventh for aids, works, public buildings, and the arts. The presidency of the council would pass from one minister to another every fifteen days.

The council would be renewed by half every year and its members were to be elected for two years. Each member of the council was to be elected by a separate poll.

The legislative body would have been able to put the members of the council on trial.

Three commissaries to the national treasury were to be elected for three years using the same electoral mode as that used to elect the members of the executive council.

=== Legislative ===
The legislative body was to be unicameral and renewed during elections held on the first Sunday of May of each year. There was to be one representative per fifty thousand souls and substitutes in equal numbers. The representatives who did not sit at the end of one month would be replaced by a substitute. The representatives would have exercised the functions of president and secretaries of the legislative assembly for one month maximum.

The constitutional law would have provided for a distinction, using several examples, between the legislative acts that would be laws and those that would be decrees, and also describe in detail the law making process.

A bureau of 13 representatives was to be formed each month to report on all bills and decrees. The members of the bureau would only have been allowed to be elected once during the same legislature.

=== Judicial ===
Civil and criminal justice are merged into a uniform code of law for the whole republic.

There is at least one Justice of the Peace per commune, elected for one year and rendering justice without fees by conciliation of the parties. In each department there is a civil jury composed of a director, a public rapporteur, a national commissary, and juries. The civil-jury table for a department is made up twice a year by the election of one jury for every 100 citizens registered on the citizenship tables of the primary assemblies.

In criminal affairs, capital punishment is abolished for private offences. All citizens have the right to be judged by a court made up of juries. The defendants go before a first jury responsible for declaring whether there are grounds for a lawsuit and if so, a second jury made of at least 12 jurors determines the verdict of the case.

Judicial censors are elected every two years and are charged with breaking the rulings rendered by infringement of the law.

A national jury renders verdicts on crimes of high treason determined by the penal code.

=== Military ===
Citizens in a position to bear arms constitute the military force of the Republic. The executive council appoints generals via commission, for the time of a campaign, and in the event of war only. Citizens of the communes appoint the commanders of the national guard.

=== Convention ===
The constitution may be modified by the national convention, convened by the legislative body every twenty years. The convention can also be proposed by any citizen or the legislative body if the majority of the citizens judges it to be necessary and approves of it by a vote in primary assemblies. The members of the legislature cannot be elected to the convention, which cannot sit more than one year. The constitution project must be accepted by the people.

=== Contributions ===
The people, by themselves or through their representatives, consent to public contributions, which are deliberated upon annually by the legislative body and cannot continue beyond one year without an explicit renewal. The share of the product of industry or work which each citizen needs to subsist is not taxable. Departments and communes can establish particular public contributions only with the authorization of the legislative body. The accounts of the expenditure are made public.

=== Foreign relations ===
The French Republic may make war by arms only "for the preservation of its liberty, the conservation of its territory and the defence of its allies". War can be decreed only by the legislative body, with the means of a signed poll, whose moment is fixed three days in advance and after "having heard the Executive Council on the state of the Republic".
