= Marguerite-Élie Guadet =

French political figure

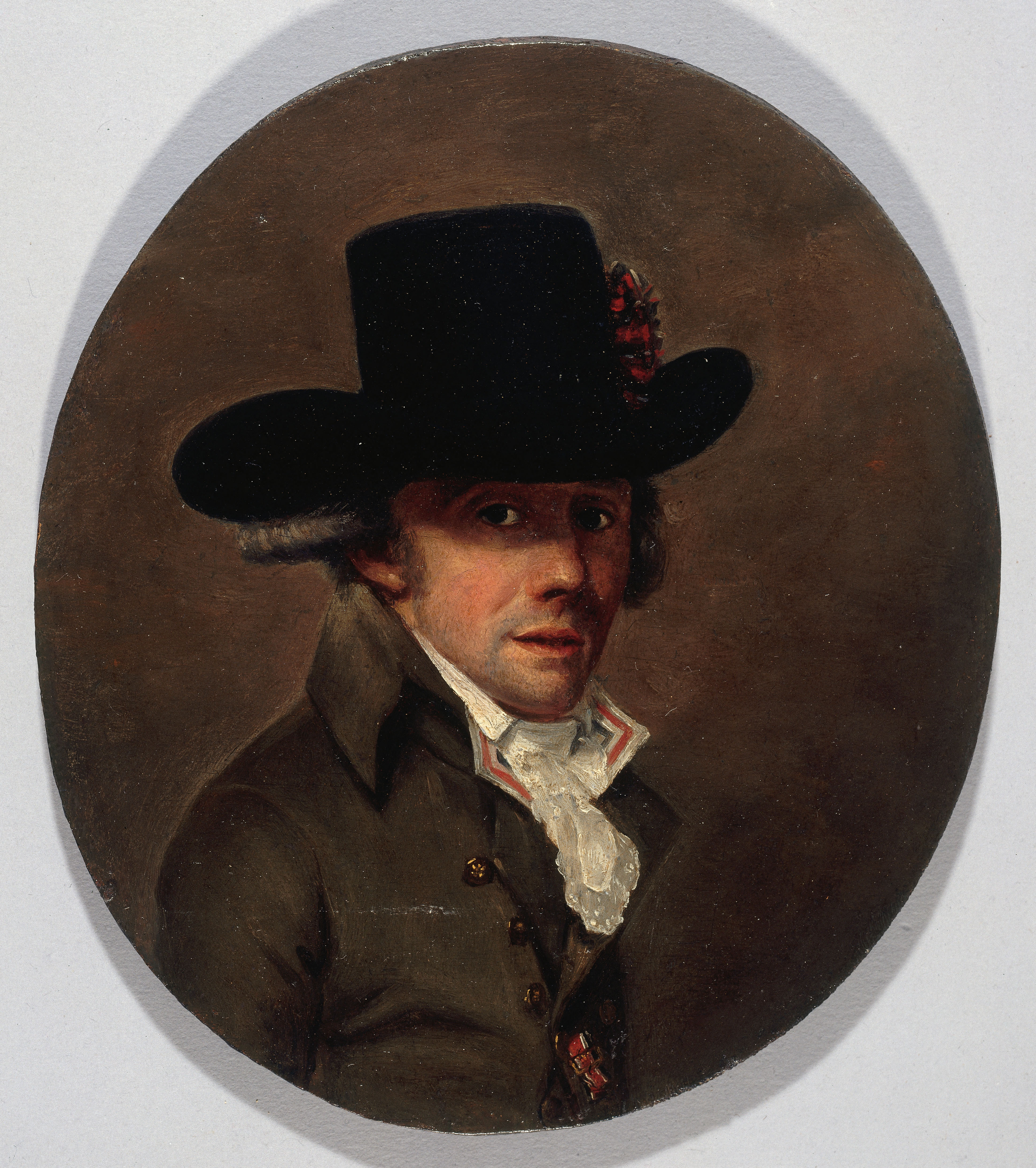
- Portrait of Guadet in 1789 (Musée Carnavalet)

3rd President of the National Convention
- In office 18 October 1792 – 1 November 1792
- Preceded by: Jean-François Delacroix
- Succeeded by: Marie-Jean Hérault de Séchelles

Member of the National Convention
- In office 21 September 1792 – 19 June 1794
- Constituency: Gironde

Personal details
- Born: 20 July 1758 Saint-Émilion, Kingdom of France
- Died: 19 June 1794 (aged 35) Bordeaux, France
- Cause of death: Execution by Guillotine
- Party: Girondins

Marguerite-Élie Guadet (French pronunciation: [maʁɡəʁit eli ɡadɛ], 20 July 1758 – 19 June 1794) was a French political figure of the Revolutionary period.

== Rise to prominence ==
Born in Saint-Émilion, Gironde, Aquitaine, he had already gained a reputation as a lawyer in Bordeaux by the time of the Revolution. In 1790 he was made administrator of the Gironde, and in 1791 president of the criminal tribunal, being elected to the Legislative Assembly as one of the group of deputies known subsequently as Girondists.

As a supporter of the monarchist and liberal constitution of 1791 he joined the Jacobin Club, and here and in the Assembly became an eloquent advocate of all the measures directed against real or supposed traitors to the Constitution.

He strongly opposed the ministers of King Louis XVI, and was largely instrumental in forcing the king to accept the Girondist ministry of 15 March 1792. He supported the policy of forcing Louis XVI into harmony with the Revolution, and moved (3 May) for the dismissal of the king's non-juring confessor, for the banishment of all non-juring priests (16 May), for the disbandment of the royal guard (30 May), and the formation in Paris of a camp des fédérés (4 June).

== August insurrection and National Convention ==
Nevertheless, he remained a Royalist, and, with Armand Gensonné and Pierre Victurnien Vergniaud, even addressed a letter to the king soliciting a private interview. Whatever negotiations may have resulted, however, were cut short by the insurrection of 10 August. Guadet, who presided over the Assembly during part of the rebellion day, placed himself into strong opposition to the insurrectionary Paris Commune, and it was on his motion that on 30 August the Assembly voted its dissolution – a decision reversed on the following day. In September, Guadet was returned by a large majority as deputy to the National Convention.

At the trial of Louis XVI he voted for an appeal to the people and for the death penalty, but with a respite pending appeal. In March 1793 he had several meetings with Georges Danton, who was anxious to bring about a rapprochement between the Girondists and The Mountain during the Revolt in the Vendée, but he unconditionally refused to join with the man whom he held responsible for the September Massacres.

Guadet was targeted during the fall of the Girondists, and his arrest being decreed on 2 June 1793, he fled to Caen, and afterwards hid in his father's house in Saint-Émilion, having previously been concealed by his sister in law, Marie-Thérèse Marinette Dupeyrat. He was discovered and taken to Bordeaux, where, after his identity had been established, he was guillotined.
