= Armand Gensonné =

French politician (1758–1793)

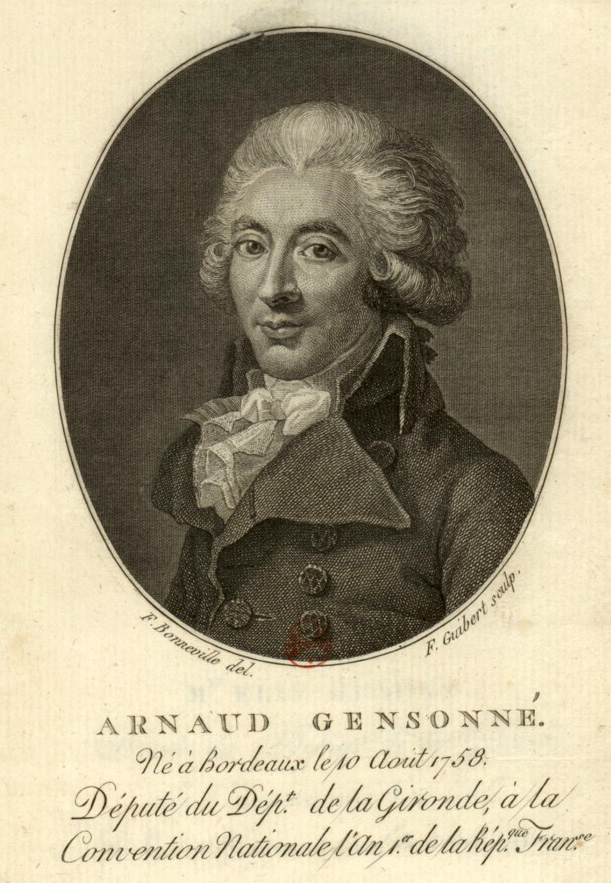

13th President of the National Convention
- In office 7–21 March 1793
- Preceded by: Edmond Louis Alexis Dubois-Crancé
- Succeeded by: Jean Debry

Personal details
- Born: 10 August 1758 Bordeaux, Kingdom of France
- Died: 31 October 1793 (aged 35) Paris, France
- Cause of death: Execution by Guillotine
- Party: Girondins

Armand Gensonné (French pronunciation: [aʁmɑ̃ ʒɑ̃sɔne], 10 August 1758 – 31 October 1793) was a French politician.

The son of a military surgeon, he was born in Bordeaux, Gascony, and studied Law before the outbreak of the French Revolution, becoming lawyer of the parlement of Bordeaux. In 1790 he became procureur of the Bordeaux Commune, and in July 1791 was elected by the newly created département of the Gironde a member of the court of appeal. In the same year he was elected deputy for the département to the Legislative Assembly. As rapporteur of the diplomatic committee, in which he supported the policy of Jacques Pierre Brissot, he proposed two of the most revolutionary measures passed by the Assembly: the decree of accusation against the King Louis XVI's brothers (the Comte de Provence and the Comte d'Artois) on 1 January 1792, and the declaration of war against the Habsburg ruler Francis II (20 April 1792).

He denounced of the intrigues of the court and of the Comité autrichien ("Austrian committee", the purported royalist group supporting the Austrians with whom the country was at war), but the violence of the extreme republicans, culminating in the riots of 10 August, alarmed him.

Elected to the National Convention, where he was regarded as one of the most brilliant of the group of orators from the Gironde (although he always read his speeches), Gensonné denounced, on 24 October, the actions of the Paris Commune following the September Massacres. At the king's trial in late December, he supported an appeal to the people, but voted for the death sentence. He participated to the Constitution Committee that drafted the Girondin constitutional project.

As a member of the Committee of General Defence, and as president of the convention (7 March–21 March 1793), he shared in the harsh attacks of the Girondists on The Mountain. On 2 June, after François Hanriot's anti-Girondist intervention, he was among the first of those inscribed on the prosecution list. Gensonné was tried by the Revolutionary Tribunal on 24 October 1793, sentenced to death and subsequently guillotined 31 October 1793.

== Bibliography ==
- 1790 – Lettre a M. Gensonné, procureur de la commune, ou Réfutation de son réquisitoire, concernent le serment des prêtres fonctionnaires publics
- 1792 – Opinion sur les colonies
- 1793 – Lettre écrite a Gensonné . Par un administrateur du département de la Gironde
