= Saint-Émilion =

- Commune
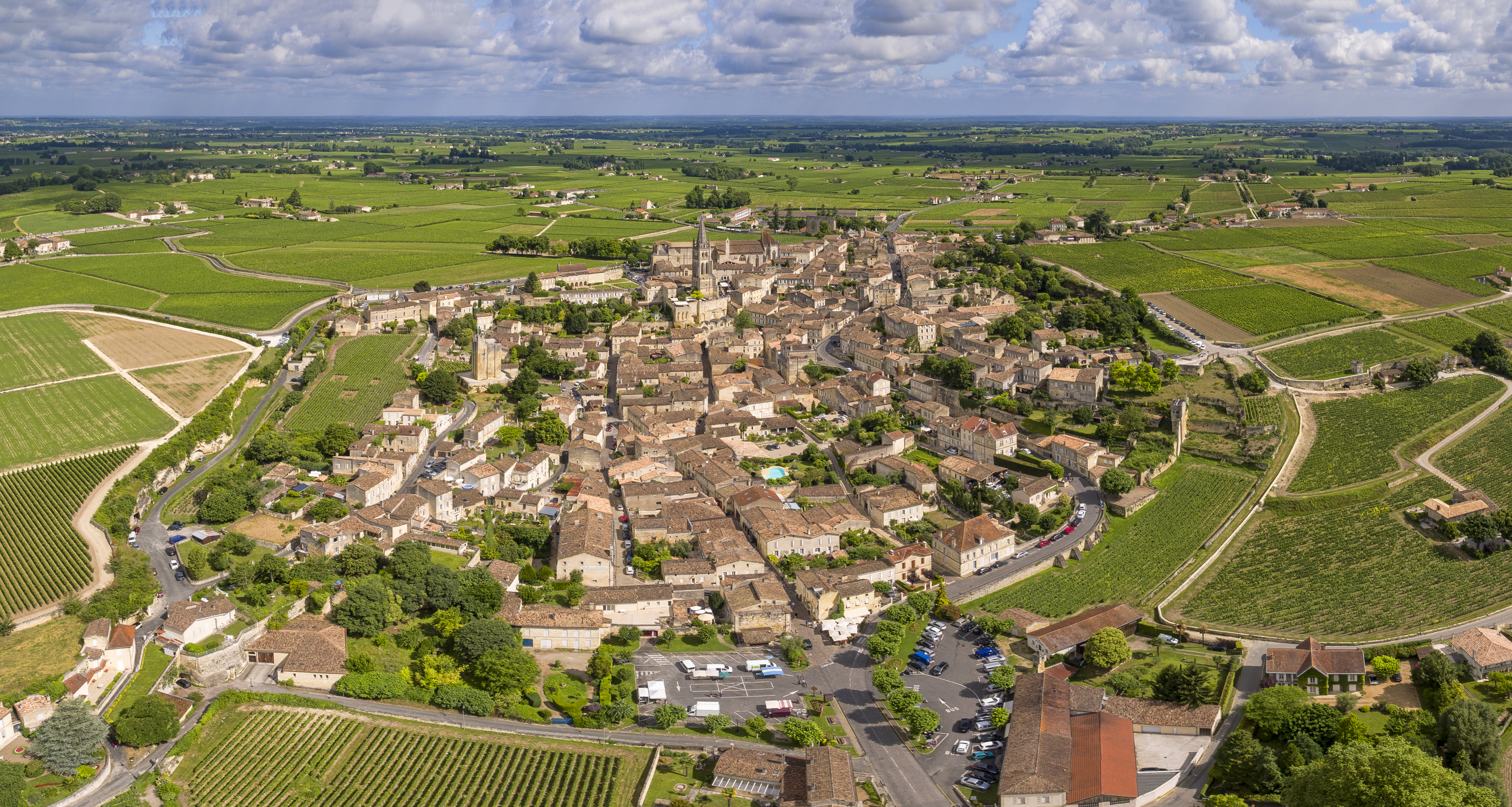
- An aerial view of Saint-Émilion

- Coat of arms
- Location of Saint-Émilion
- Location within France Location within Nouvelle-Aquitaine
- Coordinates: 44°53′37″N 0°09′17″W
- Country: France
- Region: Nouvelle-Aquitaine
- Department: Gironde
- Arrondissement: Libourne
- Canton: Les Coteaux de Dordogne

Government
  - Mayor (2020–2026): Bernard Lauret
- Area^{1}: 27.02 km^{2} (10.43 sq mi)
- Elevation: 23 m (75 ft)
- Highest elevation: 107 m (351 ft)
- Lowest elevation: 3 m (9.8 ft)
- Population (2023): 1,608
  - Density: 59.51/km^{2} (154.1/sq mi)
- Time zone: UTC+01:00 (CET)
  - Summer (DST): UTC+02:00 (CEST)
- INSEE/Postal code: 33394 /33330
- ^{1} French Land Register data, which excludes lakes, ponds, glaciers > 1 km^{2} (0.386 sq mi or 247 acres) and river estuaries.

Jurisdiction of Saint-Émilion
UNESCO World Heritage Site
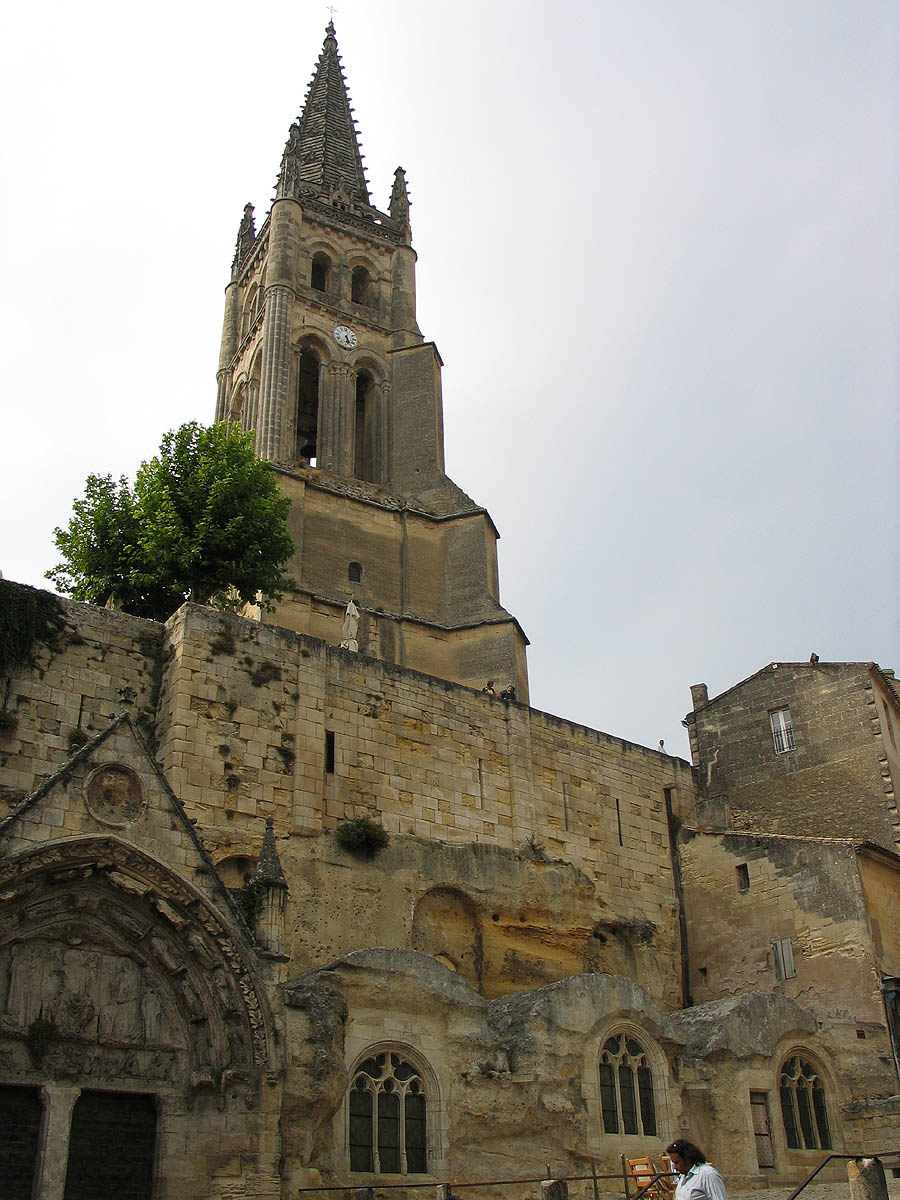
- Monolithic church of Saint-Émilion and its bell tower
- Interactive map of Jurisdiction of Saint-Émilion
- Criteria: Cultural: iii, iv
- Reference: 932
- Inscription: 1999 (23rd Session)
- Area: 7,847 ha (19,390 acres)
- Buffer zone: 5,101 ha (12,600 acres)

Saint-Émilion (French pronunciation: [sɛ̃.t‿emiljɔ̃]; Gascon: Sent Milion) is a commune in the Gironde department in Nouvelle-Aquitaine in Southwestern France.

In the heart of the country of Libournais (the area around Libourne), in a region of wine hills, Saint-Émilion is a medieval city located at the crossroads of Bordeaux, Saintonge and Périgord. The town and surrounding vineyards was made a UNESCO World Heritage Site in 1999, owing to its long, living history of wine-making, Romanesque churches and ruins stretching all along steep and narrow streets.

== History ==
Saint-Émilion's history goes back at least 35,000 years, to the Upper Paleolithic. An oppidum was built on the hill overlooking the present-day city in Gaulish times, before the region was annexed by Augustus in 27 BC. The Romans planted vineyards in what was to become Saint-Émilion as early as the 2nd century AD. In the 4th century, the Latin poet Ausonius lauded the fruit of the bountiful vine.

Saint-Émilion, previously called Ascumbas, was renamed after the Breton monk Émilion (Emilian) of Combes (d. 767). According to tradition, Émilion started as a bread-maker for the Count of Vannes. While bringing bread to the poor, a lord angrily approached Émilion and asked him what he was carrying. "These are pieces of wood intended to warm the poor", Émilion lied. He opened his coat and miraculously, the loaves of bread had transformed into wood. This wonder gave Émilion a high reputation, though he eventually left the manor to create the Hermitage of Saint-Émilion, carved from a rock shelter in a deserted forest. Émilion lived in the oratory until his death in 767, when Waiofar was the Duke of Aquitaine. The monks who followed him started commercial wine production in the area.

Because the region was located on the route of the Camino de Santiago, many monasteries and churches were built during the Middle Ages, and in 1199, while under Plantagenet rule, the town was granted full rights. During the 12th and 13th centuries, the wines produced in the area were well-renowned for their quality, although political instability during the European wars of religion negatively affected the vineyards. The region only began to recover in the late 19th century.

Saint-Émilion is known for its macaroons, which have been made continuously since 1620. The recipe has been passed down through generations by Ursuline nuns. These macarons traditionnels are made from ground almonds, sugar, and fresh egg whites.

The Jurade of Saint-Émilion is a prestigious brotherhood, founded in 1199 by John, King of England, that preserves the memory of Saint-Émilion wines and promotes them worldwide. The authority of the Jurade lasted until the French Revolution in 1789, but was revived again in 1948. Today, the 140 jurats, who wear red robes, organize wine receptions and induction ceremonies.

== Geography and description ==
Saint-Émilion is located 35 km (22 mi) east of Bordeaux, between Libourne and Castillon-la-Bataille. Saint-Émilion station has rail connections to Bordeaux, Bergerac and Sarlat-la-Canéda. Vineyards make up more than 67% of the land area of the commune. Within the region there is a mix of medieval Romanesque religious architecture and vineyard "chateaux", built in 18th and 19th centuries. In the villages, however, most of the buildings are modest, one-story stone houses dating from the 19th century.

=== Climate ===
Climate data for Saint-Émilion (1995–2020 averages)
Month	Jan	Feb	Mar	Apr	May	Jun	Jul	Aug	Sep	Oct	Nov	Dec	Year
Record high °C (°F)	18.6 (65.5)	24.7 (76.5)	26.3 (79.3)	30.8 (87.4)	35.5 (95.9)	39.7 (103.5)	40.9 (105.6)	41.6 (106.9)	37.9 (100.2)	33.0 (91.4)	25.2 (77.4)	19.7 (67.5)	41.6 (106.9)
Mean daily maximum °C (°F)	9.9 (49.8)	11.6 (52.9)	15.4 (59.7)	18.6 (65.5)	22.2 (72.0)	25.9 (78.6)	27.8 (82.0)	28.0 (82.4)	24.7 (76.5)	20.1 (68.2)	13.8 (56.8)	10.5 (50.9)	19.0 (66.2)
Daily mean °C (°F)	6.6 (43.9)	7.3 (45.1)	10.3 (50.5)	13.1 (55.6)	16.6 (61.9)	19.8 (67.6)	21.5 (70.7)	21.5 (70.7)	18.2 (64.8)	14.9 (58.8)	9.8 (49.6)	7.1 (44.8)	13.9 (57.0)
Mean daily minimum °C (°F)	3.3 (37.9)	3.1 (37.6)	5.2 (41.4)	7.6 (45.7)	11.0 (51.8)	13.8 (56.8)	15.1 (59.2)	14.9 (58.8)	11.8 (53.2)	9.6 (49.3)	5.8 (42.4)	3.6 (38.5)	8.7 (47.7)
Record low °C (°F)	−8.3 (17.1)	−12.0 (10.4)	−9.0 (15.8)	−1.8 (28.8)	2.2 (36.0)	5.6 (42.1)	7.1 (44.8)	6.2 (43.2)	2.9 (37.2)	−5.6 (21.9)	−8.0 (17.6)	−9.7 (14.5)	−12.0 (10.4)
Average precipitation mm (inches)	78.2 (3.08)	61.5 (2.42)	58.0 (2.28)	72.4 (2.85)	68.1 (2.68)	58.2 (2.29)	47.7 (1.88)	55.2 (2.17)	62.0 (2.44)	61.4 (2.42)	91.4 (3.60)	84.0 (3.31)	798.1 (31.42)
Average precipitation days (≥ 1.0 mm)	12.5	10.4	10.6	11.2	9.9	8.0	7.3	7.7	8.1	9.8	13.2	12.5	121.3
Mean monthly sunshine hours	77.8	125.8	164.2	199.0	222.0	248.7	272.9	255.0	226.9	156.0	101.5	92.4	2,142
Source: Meteociel

== Sights ==
Monolithic Church of Saint-Émilion

The monolithic church of Saint-Émilion is an 11th century church carved entirely out of a limestone cliff. It is one of the largest underground churches in Europe, with an estimated 15,000 cubic metres (530,000 cu ft) of rock extracted. The great hall measures 38 metres (125 ft) long and 20 metres (66 ft) wide, divided into three naves of six bays. Like many medieval structures, the church probably had a rich décor of painted murals; however, only a few bits of fresco remain. Iconographic works, such as depictions of lions, serpents, centaurs, and cherubim, can be seen on the walls and ceilings, possibly in reference to Psalms. Visitors can enter the church and view its catacombs.

No documents exist that discuss the building of the monolithic church, but it is hypothesized that construction took place from the late 11th century to the early 12th century. Its purpose was probably to venerate and conserve the body of the 8th century Breton monk Saint Émilion. A small monastic community that gathered near his tomb appears in late 11th century texts, and Bordeaux archbishop Arnaud Guiraud reformed the community in 1110. An inscription on one of the monolithic church pillars mentions only the day of the dedication to Saint Émilion, September 7, and regrettably not the year.

Tour du Roy

The Tour du Roy is a limestone donjon built in 1237. From its name (meaning ‘the King's tower’), some hypothesize it was constructed by order of Henry III, King of England and Duke of Aquitaine. Other sources say the Tour du Roy is not royal, and was merely the municipal bell tower for the town hall until its 1720 razing by the Jurade to enlarge the other town hall in Market Square. The Tour du Roy has a height of almost 15 metres (49 ft) and a width of more than 9 metres (30 ft). Visitors can climb inside the square tower for a panoramic view of the town. The tower is used by the Jurade to proclaim the judgment of new wine on the third Sunday of June, and the harvest ban on the third Sunday of September.

== Wine ==
Saint-Émilion is one of Bordeaux’s major red-wine regions, grouped with its Right Bank neighbor Pomerol and contrasted with the Left Bank areas of the Médoc and Graves. Located on the Right Bank of the Dordogne/Gironde river system, Saint-Émilion sits directly east of Pomerol and is considerably smaller than the Médoc.

Like Pomerol and the other Right Bank appellations, Saint-Émilion is dominated by Merlot and Cabernet Franc, with only limited use of Cabernet Sauvignon in some estates’ blends.

Saint-Émilion wines were not part of the 1855 Bordeaux Classification, which focused almost entirely on the Left Bank. Instead, the first official Saint-Émilion classification was introduced in 1955 and—unlike the static 1855 ranking—is designed to be periodically revised.

== Population ==
Historical population
Year	Pop.	±% p.a.
1968	3,403	—
1975	3,323	−0.34%
1982	3,010	−1.40%
1990	2,799	−0.90%
1999	2,345	−1.95%
2007	2,090	−1.43%
2012	1,931	−1.57%
2017	1,874	−0.60%
2023	1,608	−2.52%
Source: INSEE

Panoramic view of Saint-Émilion, July 2016
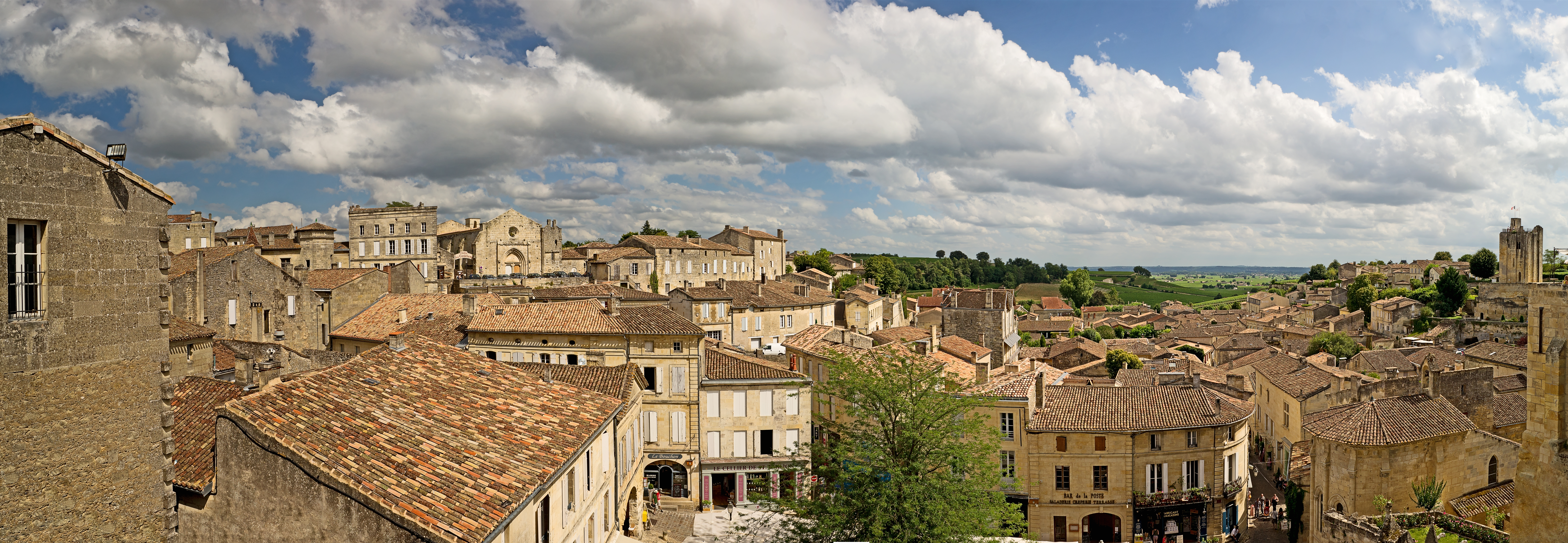
Panoramic view of Saint-Émilion, August 2012

== Saint-Émilion Jazz Festival ==
Since 2012, Saint-Émilion hosts a jazz festival at the end of July.

== Notable people ==
- Marguerite-Élie Guadet
- Clément Fayat

== See also ==
- Cordeliers Cloister
- Bordeaux wine
- French wine
- Plan Bordeaux
- Bordeaux wine regions
- Classification of Saint-Émilion wine
- Communes of the Gironde department
- Cour Saint-Émilion (Paris Métro)
