= List of members of the National Constituent Assembly of 1789 =

This list aims to display alphabetically the 1,145 titular deputies (291 deputies of the clergy, 270 of the nobility and 584 of the Third Estate-commoners) elected to the Estates-General of 1789, which became the National Assembly on 17 June 1789 and the National Constituent Assembly on 9 July 1789; as well as the alternate delegates who sat.

== A ==
- Luc René Charles Achard de Bonvouloir (1744–1827), deputy of the nobility of the bailiwick of Coutances.
- Louis Joseph Adam de Verderonne (1753–1831), deputy of the Third Estate of the bailiwick of Crépy-en-Valois.
- Henri Cardin Jean-Baptiste d'Aguesseau (1747–1826), deputy of the nobility of the bailiwick of Meaux.
- Armand Désirée de Vignerot Duplessis-Richelieu, duc d'Aiguillon (1761–1800), deputy of the nobility of Agen.
- Michel François d'Ailly, deputy of the Third Estate of Chaumont-en-Vexin.
- Antoine Balthazar Joachim d'André
- Antoine Andurand (1747–1818), deputy of the Third Estate of the sénéchaussée of Rouergue at Villefranche.
- François-Paul-Nicolas Anthoine (1720–1793), deputy of the Third Estate of the bailiwick of Sarreguemines.
- Louis-Alexandre de Launay, comte d'Antraigues, (1753–1812), deputy of the nobility of the sénéchaussée of Vivarais.
- Charles André Rémy Arnoult, (1754–1796), deputy of the Third Estate of the bailiwick of Dijon, Côte d'Or.
- Edme Aubert, (1738–1804), deputy of the clergy of the bailiwick of Chaumont-en-Bassigny.
- René François Jean Aubrée, (1763–1808)

== B ==
- René Gaston Baco de la Chapelle, (1751–1800), deputy of the Third Estate of the bailiwick of Nantes.
- Jean Sylvain Bailly (1736–1793), deputy of the Third Estate of the ville and the surroundings of Paris.
- Charles Marie de Barbeyrac, (Marquis of Saint-Maurice), deputy of the nobility of the sénéchaussée of Montpellier.
- Pierre-Louis Barbou (?-?), deputy of the clergy of the bailiwick of Meaux.
- Bertrand Barère de Vieuzac, (1755–1841), deputy of the Third Estate of the bailiwick of Toulouse.
- Antoine Barnave, (1761–1793), deputy of the Third Estate
- Alexandre François Marie, vicomte de Beauharnais (1760–1794), deputy of the nobility of the bailiwick of Blois.
- Bon-Albert Briois de Beaumetz, (1759–1801), deputy of the nobility of Artois.
- Jacques-François Begouën, (1743–1831), deputy of the Third Estate of the bailiwick of Caux.
- François Becherel, (1732–1815),
- Nicolas Bergasse, (1750–1832), deputy of the Third Estate of the sénéchaussée of Lyon.
- Louis de Boislandry, (1750–1834), deputy of the Third Estate of Paris
- Jean de Dieu-Raymond de Boisgelin de Cucé
- Charles-François de Bonnay
- Jean-Joseph de Bonnegens des Hermitans (1750–1817), deputy of the Third Estate of the sénéchaussée of Saint-Jean-d'Angély.
- Jean Nicolas Bordeaux, deputy of the Third Estate of Chaumont-en-Vexin.
- Jean-Baptiste Bottex (Abbot), (?- 1792), deputy of the clergy
- Jean-Pierre Boullé (1753–1816), deputy of the Third Estate of the sénéchaussée of Ploërmel.
- Jean Anthelme Brillat-Savarin, (1755–1826), deputy of the Third Estate of the bailiwick of Bugey.
- Pierre-Louis-Robert de Briois, (?- ?), deputy of the nobility of Artois.
- Jean-Xavier Bureau de Pusy (1750–1806).
- François Nicolas Léonard Buzot (1760–1794), deputy of the Third Estate of the bailiwick of Évreux.

== C ==
- Armand-Gaston Camus (1740–1804), deputy of the Third Estate of the prévôté and of the Viscountcy of Paris.
- Boniface Louis André de Castellane-Novejean, (1758–1837), deputy of the nobility of the bailiwick of Châteauneuf-en-Thymerais, in the Perche.
- Charles de la Croix de Castries (1756–1842), deputy of the nobility of the prévôté and of the Viscountcy of Paris.
- Jacques Antoine Marie de Cazalès (1748–1805), deputy of the nobility of the bailiwick of Rivière-Verdun.
- Charles Antoine Chasset, (1748–1805), deputy of the Third Estate of the sénéchaussée of Villefranche (Saône-et-Loire).
- Jean-Antoine-Auguste de Chastenet de Puységur, Archbishop of Bourges, (1740–1815), deputy of the clergy of the bailiwick of Bourges.
- Louis Marie Florent du Châtelet (1727–1793), deputy of the nobility of the bailiwick of Bar-le-Duc.
- François-Charles Chevreuil (d. 1792), Chancellor of the Church and of the University of Paris, deputy of the clergy of Paris.
- Stanislas Marie Adelaide, comte de Clermont-Tonnerre (1757–1792), deputy of the nobility of the prévôté and the Viscountcy of Paris.
- Robert Coquille
- Pierre-Paul Colonna de Cesari Rocca, (1748- ?), deputy of the Third Estate of the Island of Corsica.
- Jean Colson (1734–1801), deputy of the clergy of the bailiwick of Sarreguemines.
- Félix-François-Dorothée de Balbes de Berton de Crillon (1748–1820)
- Louis-Pierre-Nolasque de Balbes de Berton de Crillon (Duke of), (1742–1806), deputy of the nobility of Beauvais (Oise).
- Anne Emmanuel de Crussol d'Amboise (1726–1794), deputy of the nobility of the sénéchaussée of Poitiers.
- Alexandre de Culant, (1733–1799), deputy of the nobility of the bailiwick of Angoulême.
- Adam Philippe, Comte de Custine, (1740–1793), Deputy to the Estates-General, bailiwick of Metz

== D ==
- Luc Jacques Édouard Dauchy, (Count), (1757–1817), deputy of the Third Estate of Clermont, (Oise).
- Lucien David (1730–1792), (Abbot), deputy of the clergy of the bailiwick of Beauvais, (Oise).
- Nicolas Pierre Antoine Delacour, deputy of the Third Estate of Senlis, (Oise).
- Claude-Pierre Dellay d'Agier, (1750–1827), deputy of the nobility of the province of Dauphiné.
- Guillaume-Antoine Delfaud, (1733–1792), deputy of the clergy of the Diocese of Sarlat.
- Joseph-Bernard Delilia de Crose, (1739–1804).
- Thomas-Joseph Desescoutes (1736–1791), deputy of the Third Estate of the bailiwick of Meaux.
- Pierre-Etienne Despatys de Courteille (1753–1841), deputy of the Third Estate of the bailiwicks of Melun and Moret-sur-Loing.
- Jean-Nicolas Démeunier (or Desmeunier), (1751–1814), deputy of the Third Estate.
- René Desmontiers de Mérinville (Bishop of Dijon) (d. 1792), deputy of the clergy of the bailiwick of Dijon.
- Antoine-Louis-Claude Destutt de Tracy (1754–1836), deputy of the nobility of Bourbonnais.
- Jean-Claude Dubois (1742–1836), deputy of the Third Estate of the sénéchaussée of Châtellerault.
- François-Marie Dubuat (1752–1807), alternate deputy of the Third Estate of the bailiwick of Meaux (On 14 May 1790, he replaced the Marquess of Aguesseau, who had resigned).
- Jean-Baptiste Dumayor (1758 – ca. 1793), alternate deputy of the Third Estate of the bailiwick of Sarreguemines, (On 21 January 1790, he replaced the Count of Helmstatt, who had resigned).
- Jean-Baptiste Dumouchelle, (1748–1820), deputy of the clergy of Paris.
- Pierre Samuel du Pont de Nemours (Pierre-Samuel Dupont, called) (1739–1817), deputy of the Third Estate of the bailiwick of Nemours.
- Adrien Duport

== E ==
- Maurice Joseph Louis Gigost d'Elbée
- Jean-Louis Emmery
- Jean-Jacques Duval d'Eprémesnil (1745–1794), deputy of the nobility of Paris
- Louis Marie d'Estourmel, (1744–1823), deputy of the nobility.

== F ==
- Jean Jacques Farochon (Abbot), deputy of the clergy of Crépy-en-Valois
- Gabriel Feydel (1744–1827), deputy of the Third Estate of the sénéchaussée of Quercy.
- Jean-Baptiste de Flachslanden, (1749–1822), deputy of the nobility of the bailiwick of Strasbourg.
- Jean-François Henri de Flaschlanden, deputy of the nobility of Colmar
- Emmanuel Marie Michel Philippe Fréteau de Saint-Just (1745–1794), deputy of the nobility of the bailiwicks of Melun and Moret-sur-Loing.

== G ==
- Dominique Joseph Garat (1749–1833), deputy of the Third Estate des Basses-Pyrénées.
- Alexandre Gardiol, (? – ?), deputy of the clergy
- Jean Garnier, (1748–1824), deputy of the clergy of the bailiwick of Dol.
- Jean-François Gaultier de Biauzat (1739–1815), deputy of the Third Estate of the sénéchaussée of Clermont (Puy-de-Dôme).
- Christophe Antoine Gerle Chalini, (1735–1801), deputy of the clergy of the bailiwick of Riom.
- Jacques-Marie Glezen, (1737–1801), deputy of the Third Estate of the sénéchaussée of Rennes.
- Louis-Gabriel de Gomer (Count) (1718–1798), deputy of the noblesse of the bailiwick of Sarreguemines.
- Arnaud Gouges-Cartou, (1738), deputy of the Third Estate of the sénéchaussée of Quercy at Cahors.
- Henri Grégoire, also called Abbé Grégoire, (1750–1831), deputy of the clergy of the bailiwick of Nancy.
- Jean-Baptiste Grenier (1753–1838), deputy of the Third Estate of the sénéchaussée of Riom.
- Louis-Charles de Grieu (1755), deputy of the clergy of the bailiwick of Rouen, Seine-Maritime.
- Joseph-Marie Gros (1742–1792), priest of the Church of Saint Nicholas of Chardonnet, deputy of the clergy of Paris.
- Julien Guégan (1746–1794), deputy of the clergy of the diocese of Vannes, Morbihan.
- Joseph Ignace Guillotin, (1738–1814).

== H ==
- Gustave Hainsselin
- Antoine Bernard Hanoteau, (1751–1822), deputy of the Third Estate of Crépy-en-Valois, (Oise).
- Mathurin François Hardy de Largère, (1729–1792), mayor of Vitré, deputy of the Third Estate of the sénéchaussée of Rennes, (Ille-et-Vilaine).
- Maximilien-Auguste Bleickard d'Helmstatt (Count) (1728–1802), deputy of the nobility of the bailiwick of Sarreguemines.
- Guillaume-Benoît Houdet (1744–1812), deputy of the Third Estate of the bailiwick of Meaux.
- Philippe d'Humières (Baron of Scorailles), (1748–1822), deputy of the nobility

== J ==
- Etienne François Charles de Jaucen, (Baron of Poissac), (1733 – ?), deputy of the nobility of Limousin.
- François-Antoine-Nicolas Jersey (1754 – ?), alternate deputy of the Third Estate of the bailiwick of Sarreguemines, (On 21 January 1790, he replaced the Count of Gomer, who had resigned).
- Alexandre Paul Guérin de Tournel de Joyeuse de Chateauneuf-Randon (Marquess) (1757–1827), deputy of the nobility of the bailiwick of Mende.
- Pierre-Mathieu Joubert, deputy of the clergy of the bailiwick of Angoulême.

== L ==
- Anne Louis Henri de La Fare, (1752–1829), Bishop of Nancy, deputy of the clergy of the bailiwick of Nancy, (Meurthe-et-Moselle).
- Dominique de La Rochefoucauld (1713–1800), (Cardinal), Archbishop of Rouen, deputy of the clergy of the bailiwick of Rouen, (Seine-Maritime).
- François Alexandre Frédéric, duc de La Rochefoucauld-Liancourt (1747–1827), deputy of the nobility of Clermont, (Oise).
- François de La Rochefoucauld-Bayers (d. 1792), Bishop-Count of Beauvais and pair de France, deputy of the clergy of Clermont (Oise).
- Pierre-Louis of the Rochefoucauld-Bayers (d. 1792), Bishop of Saintes, deputy of the clergy of Saintes (Charente-Maritime).
- Gilbert du Motier, Marquis de Lafayette (1757–1834)
- Trophime-Gérard, marquis de Lally-Tollendal (1751–1830)
- César-Guillaume de La Luzerne
- Alexandre-Théodore-Victor, comte de Lameth (1760–1829)
- Charles Malo François Lameth (1757–1832)
- Jean Denis, comte Lanjuinais
- Louis-Marie de La Révellière-Lépeaux (1753–1824)
- Charles César de Fay de La Tour-Maubourg (1757–1831)
- Armand Louis de Gontaut, duc de Lauzun et Biron, (1747–1793), deputy of the nobility of the sénéchaussée of Quercy at Cahors.
- Charles Leblanc, deputy of the Third Estate of Senlis, (Oise).
- Antoine-Éléonor-Léon Leclerc de Juigné, (1728–1811), Archbishop of Paris, Duke of Saint-Cloud, pair de France, deputy of the clergy of Paris.
- Isaac Le Chapelier
- Jean-Georges Lefranc de Pompignan
- Laurent-François Legendre, (1741–1802), deputy of the Third Estate of the sénéchaussée of Brest.
- Jean-Baptiste Lemoyne de Bellisle, deputy of the nobility of Chaumont-en-Vexin, (Oise).
- Louis-Michel Lepeletier de Saint-Fargeau (1760–1793)
- Gaston Pierre Marc Levis, (Duke of), deputy of the nobility of Senlis, (Oise).
- Jacques de Lombard-Taradeau, (1750 – ?), deputy of the Third Estate of the sénéchaussée of Draguignan.

== M ==
- Jean-Baptiste de Malleret (Marquess of Saint-Maixant), deputy of the nobility
- Pierre Victor, baron Malouet (1740–1814), deputy of the Third Estate of Thiers
- Jean-Joseph Manhaval (1736–1813), deputy of the Third Estate of the sénéchaussée of Rouergue at Villefranche.
- Jean-Baptiste Massieu (1743–1814), deputy of the clergy of Senlis, (Oise).
- Jean-Antoine Maudru
- Jean-Sifrein Maury (l'Abbé Maury).
- Pierre-François Mayer (? – ?), deputy of the Third Estate of the bailiwick of Sarreguemines.
- Antoine-Jean-François Ménager (1756–1826), alternate deputy of the Third Estate of the bailiwick of Meaux. (In 1791 replaced his father-in-law, Thomas-Joseph Desescoutes, who had resigned for reasons of health.)
- Jacques François Menou, deputy of the nobility
- Claude Merceret, deputy of the clergy of the bailiwick of Dijon, Côte d'Or.
- Philippe-Antoine Merlin de Douai (1754–1838)
- François Anne Joseph Meurinne, deputy of the Third Estate of Clermont, (Oise).
- François Millon de Montherlant (1726–1794), deputy of the Third Estate of the bailiwick of Beauvais, (Oise).
- Samuel de Missy
- André Boniface Louis Riquetti de Mirabeau (1754–1795), called Mirabeau-Tonneau, deputy of the nobility of the sénéchaussée of Limoges.
- Honoré Gabriel Riqueti, comte de Mirabeau (1749–1791)
- Jean-Charles-Antoine Morel (1752–1832), alternate deputy of the bailiwick of Sarreguemines, (On 21 January 1790, he replaced Pierre-François Mayer, who had resigned).
- Ildut Moyot, (1749–1813), deputy of the Third Estate of the sénéchaussée of Brest.
- François-Xavier-Marc-Antoine de Montesquiou-Fézensac (1757–1832), deputy of the clergy of Paris
- Anne-Pierre, marquis de Montesquiou-Fézensac (1739–1798)
- Mathieu Jean Félicité, duc de Montmorency-Laval (1766–1826), deputy of the nobility of the bailiwick of Montfort-l'Amaury.
- Médéric Louis Élie Moreau de Saint-Méry (1750–1803)
- Jean Baptiste Mosneron de l'Aunay, (1738–1830)
- Jean Joseph Mounier, (1758–1806), deputy of the Third Estate of the Dauphiné.

== N ==
- Jean Baptiste Nadal de Saintrac, (1745–1809).
- Louis-Marie de Nicolaï, (1729–1791), Bishop of Cahors, deputy of the clergy of the sénéchaussée of Quercy at Cahors.
- Louis Marc Antoine de Noailles, deputy of the nobility of the bailiwick of Nemours.

== O ==
- Louis Philippe Joseph de Bourbon, duc d'Orléans, called Philippe Égalité (1747–1793), deputy of the nobility of Crépy-en-Valois, (Oise).
- Pierre Oudaille, deputy of the Third Estate of Beauvais, (Oise).

== P ==
- Armand Jean Simon Brunet de Castelpers de Panat (Abbot), deputy of the clergy of Chaumont-en-Vexin, (Oise).
- Charles-Antoine Peretti della Rocca (1750–1815), deputy of the clergy of the Island of Corsica.
- Charles-César Perier (1748–1797), deputy of the clergy of the bailiwick of Étampes.
- Louis François Marie de Perusse d'Escars, (Count of Cars and Saint Bonnet), (1737–1814), deputy of the nobility of Limousin.
- Jérôme Pétion de Villeneuve, (1756–1794).
- Étienne-François-Charles Jaucen de Poissac (baron), (1733–1803), deputy of the nobility of the sénéchaussée of Tulle (Low country of Limousin).
- Pierre-Louis Prieur called Prieur of the Marne, (1756–1827).
- Jean Auguste de Chastenet de Puységur, (1740–1815), Archbishop of Bourges, deputy of the clergy of the bailiwick of Bourges (Cher).

== R ==
- Jean-Paul Rabaut de Saint-Étienne, (1743–1793), deputy of the Third Estate of the sénéchaussée of Nîmes and of Beaucaire
- Jean-François Rewbell, called Reubell, (1747–1807)
- Jean François de Reynaud de Villevert, (Count), (1731 – ?), deputy of the North of the colony of Saint-Domingue.
- Gilbert de Riberolles, (1749–1823), deputy of the Third Estate of the sénéchaussée of Riom.
- Guillaume-Amable Robert de Chevannes, (1752–1828), deputy of the Third Estate of the sénéchaussée of Nevers.
- Maximilien de Robespierre (1758–1794), deputy of the Third Estate of Arras.
- Pierre-Louis Roederer, (1754–1835)
- Jean-Joseph Rocque, (1749- ?), deputy of the Third Estate of the sénéchaussée of Béziers.
- Jean-Joseph de Mougins de Roquefort, (1742–1822), deputy of the Third Estate of the sénéchaussée of Grasse.
- François Pierre Olivier de Rougé (marquis), (1756–1816), deputy of the nobility,
- Guillaume-Grégoire de Roulhac (1751–1824), deputy of the Third Estate of the sénéchaussée of Limoges (High country of Limousin).
- Pierre-Jean de Ruallem (?-?), Abbot of Saint-Faron de Meaux, alternate deputy of the clergy of the bailiwick of Meaux. (On 29 octobre 1789 he replaced Pierre-Louis Barbou, who had resigned.)

== S ==
- Pierre-François de Saint-Martial,
- Claude-Anne de Saint-Simon, (Marquess), (1743–1819), deputy of the nobility of the bailiwick of Angoulême.
- Christophe Saliceti, (1757–1809), deputy of the Third Estate of the Island of Corsica.
- Étienne François Sallé de Chou (1754–1832), deputy of the Berry.
- Louis-Joseph Schmits (1758–1819), deputy of the Third Estate of the bailiwick of Sarreguemines
- Emmanuel-Joseph Sieyès (1748–1836).

== T ==
- Charles Maurice de Talleyrand-Périgord (1754–1838)
- Armand-Constant Tellier (1755–1795), deputy of the Third Estate of the bailiwicks of Melun and Moret-sur-Loing.
- Anne-Alexandre-Marie Thibault (?-1813 ?), deputy of the clergy of the bailiwick of Nemours
- Jean Thomas (?-?), deputy of the clergy of the bailiwick of Melun-Moret.
- Jacques Guillaume Thouret (1746–1794)
- Jean-Baptiste Treilhard
- François Denis Tronchet
- Jean de Turckheim, deputy of the Third Estate of the bailiwick of Strasbourg

== V ==
- Marc Guillaume Alexis Vadier (1736–1828)
- Pierre-Vincent Varin de la Brunelière, (1752–1794), alternate deputy of the Third Estate of the sénéchaussée of Rennes (replaced Étienne Eusèbe Joseph Huard after the latter's death (1789)).
- Louis Verdet (1744–1819), deputy of the clergy of the bailiwick of Sarreguemines.
- Théodore Vernier (1731–1818), deputy of the Third Estate of the sénéchaussée of Lons-le-Saunier.
- François Xavier Veytard (1731–1797), deputy of the clergy of Paris
- Pierre-André-François Viau de Thébaudières, (1751 – ?), deputy of the North of the colony of Saint-Domingue.
- Jean-Georges-Charles Voidel (1758 – ca. 1793), deputy of the Third Estate of the bailiwick of Sarreguemines.
- Alexandre-Eugène Volfius, deputy of the Third Estate of the bailiwick of Dijon, Côte d'Or.
- Constantin-François Chassebœuf, comte de Volney, (1757–1820)

== Notes ==
- Note 1: The names of alternate deputies who sat are indicated in italics. When known, the names of the deputies they replaced are indicated after the alternates' names.
- Note 2: For the distinction between bailliage (here given as "bailiwick") and sénéchaussée, see bailiwick.

== Bibliography ==
- Principally derived from Notices et Portraits des Députés de 1789, from the French National Assembly site.
