= Louis-Gabriel =

Louis-Gabriel or Louis Gabriel is a French given name. Notable people with the name include:

- Louis-Gabriel Du Buat-Nançay (1732–1787), 18th-century French playwright, historian and political writer
- Louis Gabriel de Contades (1759–1825), French aristocrat, soldier, and politician
- Louis Gabriel Cowan or Gabriel Cowan, American film director, composer and film producer
- Louis Gabriel Deniéport (1765–1805), French naval captain
- Gabriel-Taurin Dufresse, also known as Louis-Gabriel-Taurin Dufresse, MEP (1750–1815), French Catholic prelate
- Louis Gabriel d'Antessanty (or Abbé G.) (1834–1922), French entomologist
- Louis-Gabriel de Gomer (1718–1798), French military officer, inventor of the Gomer mortar
- Louis-Gabriel Guillemain (1705–1770), French composer and violinist
- Eugene Louis Gabriel Isabey (1803–1886), French painter, lithographer and watercolorist
- Louis Gabriel Michaud (1773–1858), French writer, historian, printer, and bookseller
- Dominique Louis Gabriel Joseph Marie de La Rochefoucauld de Montbel (born 1950), French humanitarian diplomat
- Louis Gabriel Montigny (1784–1846), 19th-century French playwright and writer
- Louis-Gabriel Moreau (1740–1806), French graphic artist and landscape painter
- Louis-Gabriel Pambo, Gabonese politician
- Louis Gabriel Robles (born 1996), English professional footballer
- Louis Gabriel Abraam Samuel Jean Secretan (1758–1839), Swiss lawyer, politician and mycologist
- Louis-Gabriel Suchet (1770–1826), French Marshal of the Empire
- Louis-Gabriel-Charles Vicaire (1848–1900), French poet
- Jules Louis Gabriel Violle (1841–1923), French physicist and inventor

== See also ==
- Pierre-Louis Gabriel Falaize (1905–1974), French journalist, Resistance fighter and Ambassador
- Albert-Louis Gabriel (1883–1972), French architect, painter, archaeologist, art historian and traveller
- Louis Gabriel (1857–1927), Australian photographer and medical practitioner
