= D'Aguesseau =

D'Aguesseau is a French surname. Notable people with the surname include:

- Henri François d'Aguesseau (1668–1751), chancellor of France
- Henri-Cardin-Jean-Baptiste d'Aguesseau (1752–1826), French politician
- Henriette Anne Louise d'Aguesseau (1737–1794), French salon hostess and duchess
