= Arsène-Marie Le Feuvre =

French politician and painter (1863–1936)

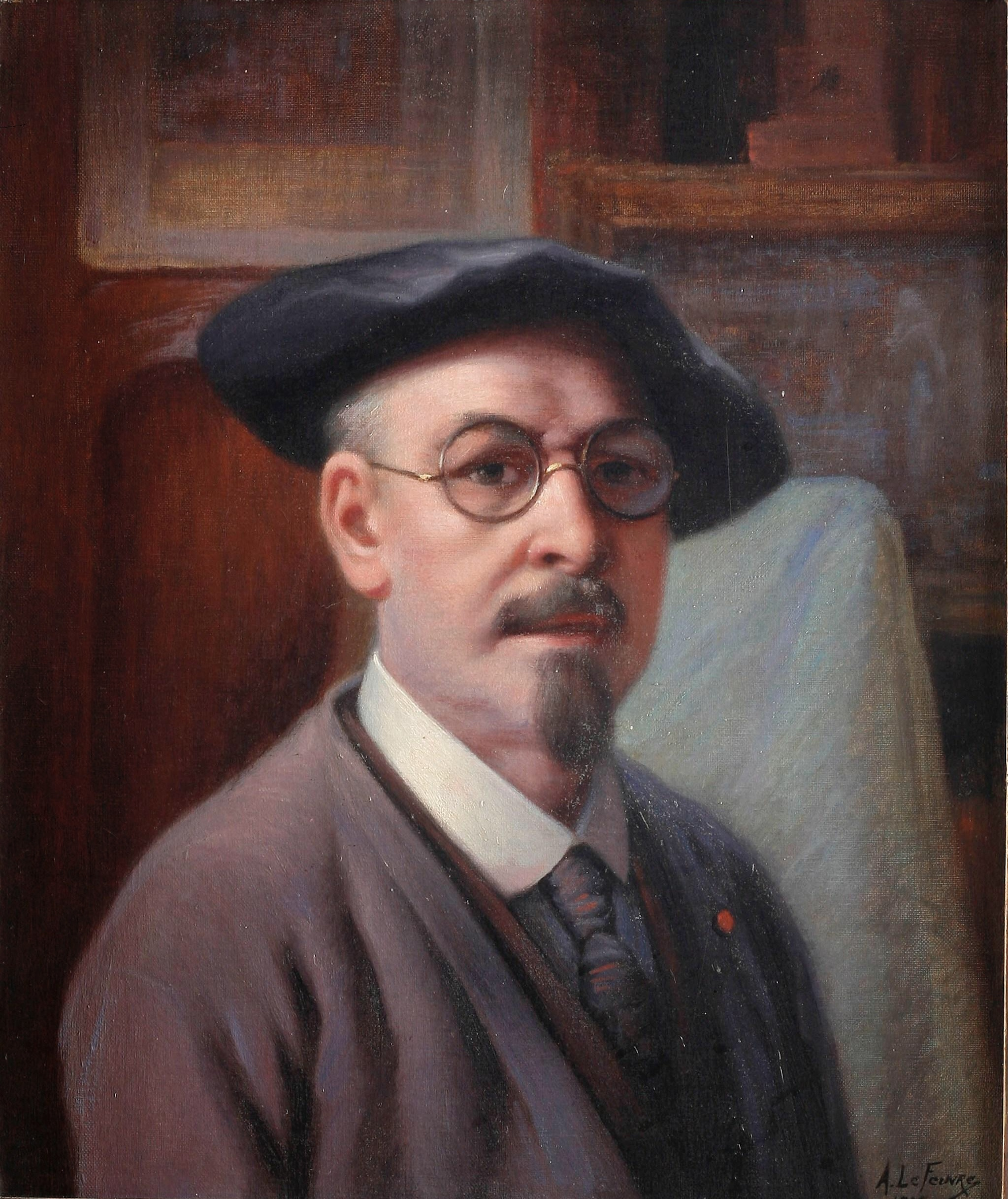
- Self-portrait, 1936 (Sillé-le-Guillaume collection).
- Born: 6 May 1863; Sillé-le-Guillaume, France
- Died: 12 December 1936 (aged 73)
- Occupations: Politician and painter

Marie Arsène Le Feuvre (Note: Sometimes given as Arsène Marie Le Feuvre or Arsène-Marie Le Feuvre) (6 May 1863 - 12 December 1936) was a French politician and painter. He is notable as the designer of the 'Cadum Baby' poster.

== Life ==
=== Early life ===
He was born in Sillé-le-Guillaume to stonecutter Pierre Clovis Gervais Le Feuvre and Joséphine Chanteau, who had married in 1858 in Le Grez. Pierre was the son of a day labourer whilst Joséphine's father, brother and one of her uncles were all also stonecutters. After some time in Le Mans at an unknown date, Pierre became a sculptor, as did his eldest sons Pierre and Alphonse.

Arsène was the couple's third son. From 15 August 1877 to 15 September 1881 he learned decorative painting under Charles Jaffard, who ran a small decorating business in Le Mans and painted two frescoes (Anunciation and Coronation of the Virgin Mary) for the église Notre-Dame-du-Pré in that city. In 1880 Arsène exhibited two paintings at the fine arts exhibition, the still life Dead Bird and the genre scene A Modest Dinner.

At the end of his apprenticeship he was admitted to the studios of Auguste Rubé and his collaborators Philippe Chaperon, Marcel Jambon, along with those of Pierre-Victor Galland and Jean-Jacques Scherrer in Paris - Scherrer and Galland were then both scenery painters at the Opéra de Paris. At the same time he trained at Paris' École des arts décoratifs.

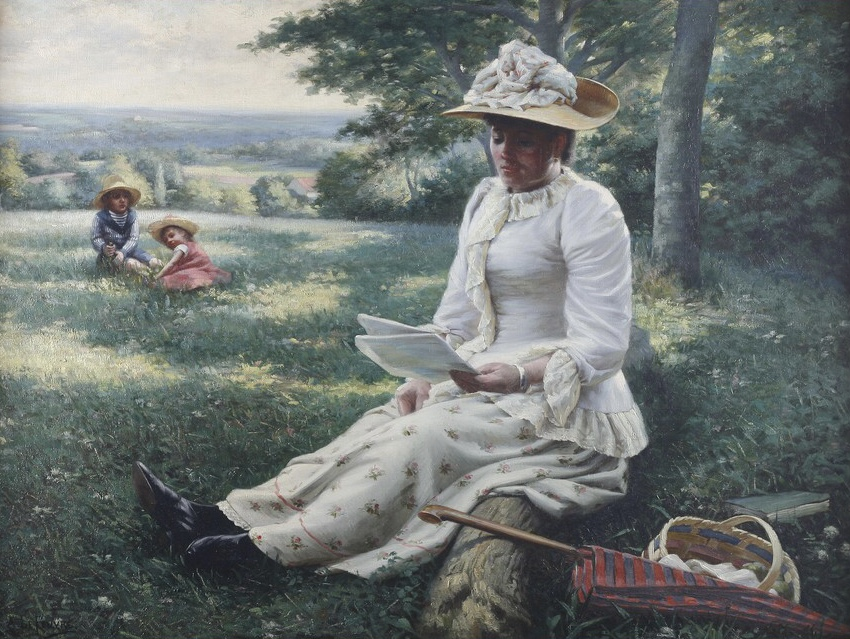
The artist's family in the vallée Saint Blaise, 1895 - Collection Arsène Le Feuvre Mairie de Sillé-le-Guillaume Ville de Sillé-le-Guillaume, Le Feuvre collection.

On 10 March 1885 he married Marie Renée Le Corre in the 14th arrondissement of Paris. They had one two children, Arsène junior (born 26 November 1883, Paris) and Marthe (24 September 1888, Le Mans - 1899), the latter of whom died after a severe illness.

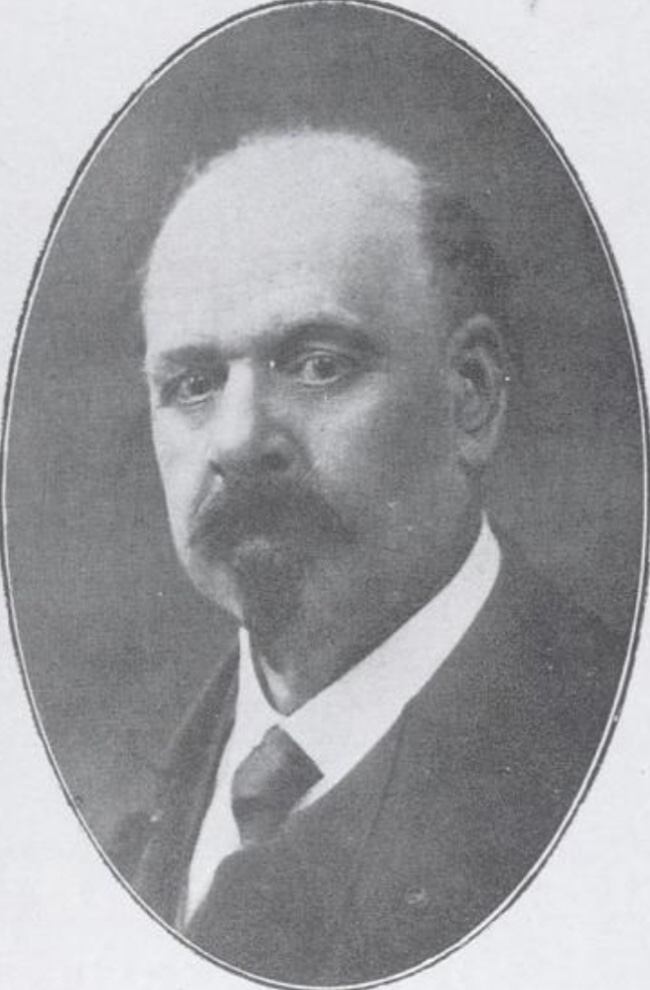
Le Feuvre as mayor.

=== Recognition as an artist ===
He quickly became a well-reputed painter, known as "Arsène Marie Le Feuvre, whooping cough of official painting and future mayor of Le Mans". He and Lionel Royer studied under Pierre Andrieu, who was himself a pupil of Eugène Delacroix. He had a personal style of painting. Along with canvases, he also led a parallel career in Le Mans as a painter decorator.

He also produced a few illustrations and posters and was a noted figure in the French artistic world, gaining him lucrative commissions. None of his illustrious competitors were able to equal his celebrity. His artistic career lasted forty-two years.

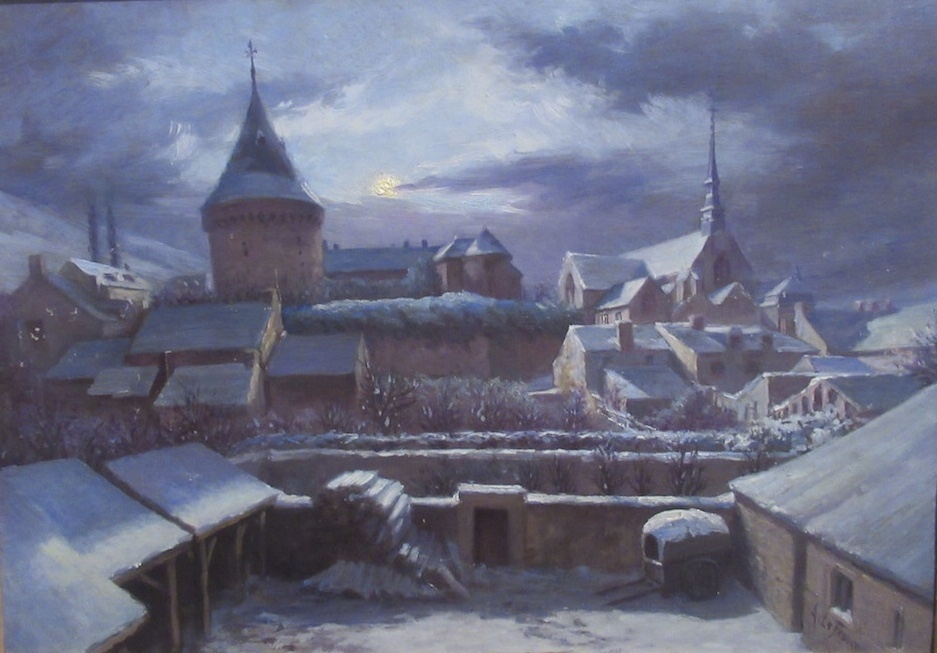
Arsène Lefeuvre, 15th Century Castle, circa 1880.

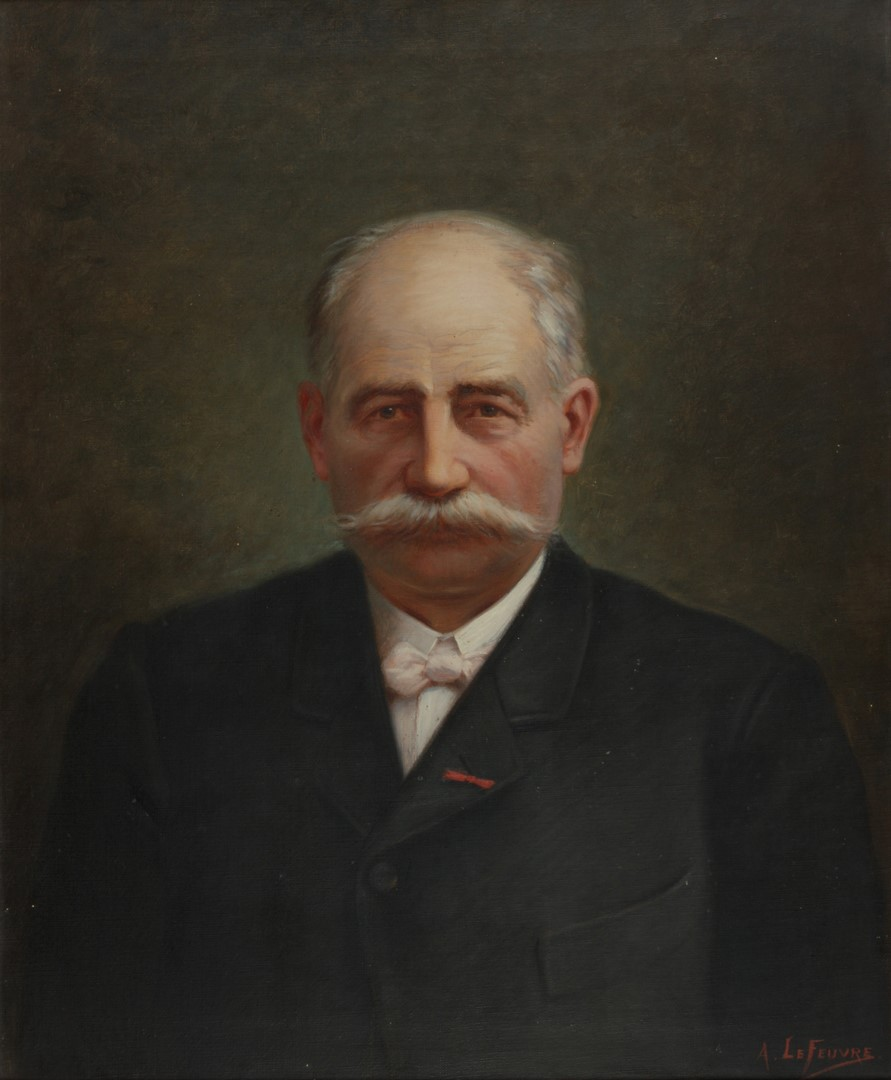
Adrien Tironneau, by Arsène Le Feuvre the elder, 1906 (Musées du Mans)

In 1885 Le Feuvre founded a decorating studio at 1 rue Jacob in Le Mans, then a branch of the same at 117 rue Notre-Dame-des-Champs in Paris around 1910. There he produced several paintings on Gobelins textiles, important decorative panels evoking pastoral scenes or symbolising a town, a region or an activity in human life. On 6 May 1900 he was elected municipal counsellor for Le Mans.

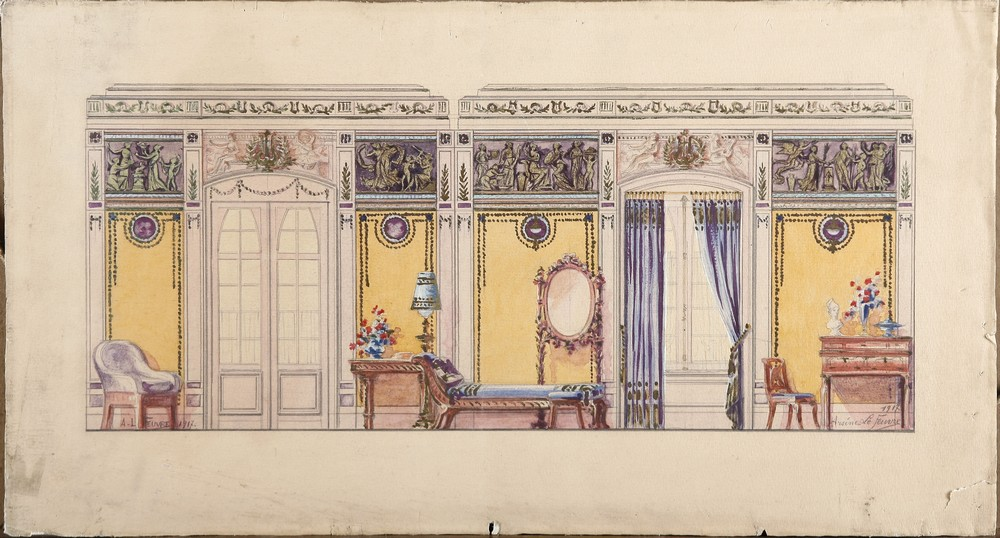
Decoration of a salon, 1917 - Collection Arsène Le Feuvre - Mairie de Sillé-le-Guillaume.

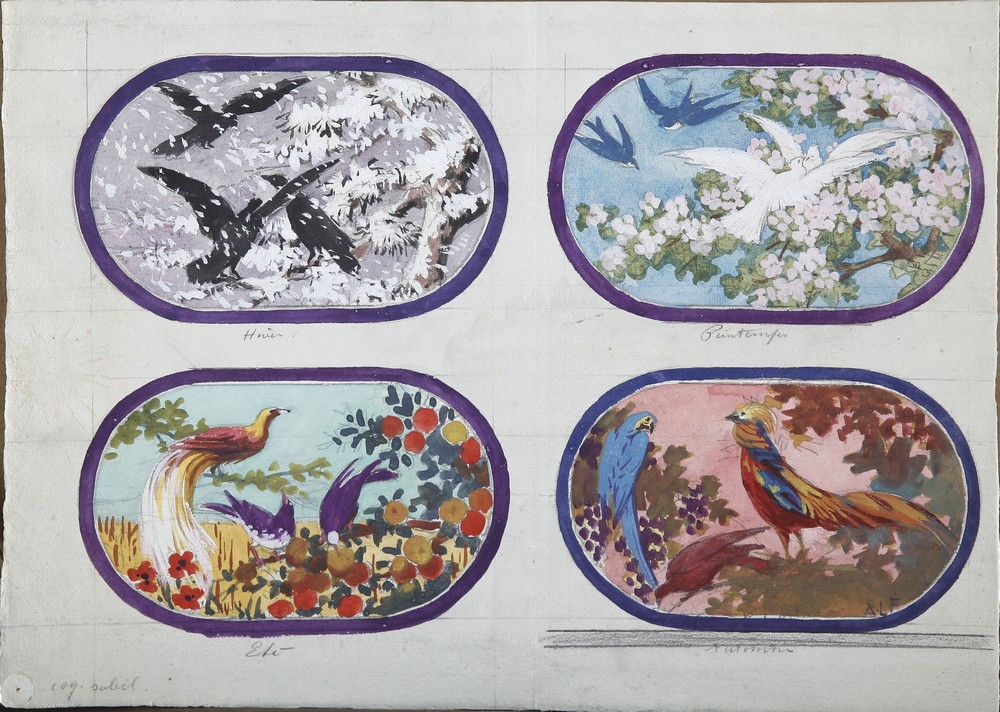
The Four Seasons, c. 1925 - Collection Arsène Le Feuvre - Mairie de Sillé-le- Guillaume.

=== Designer of the 'Cadum baby' ===
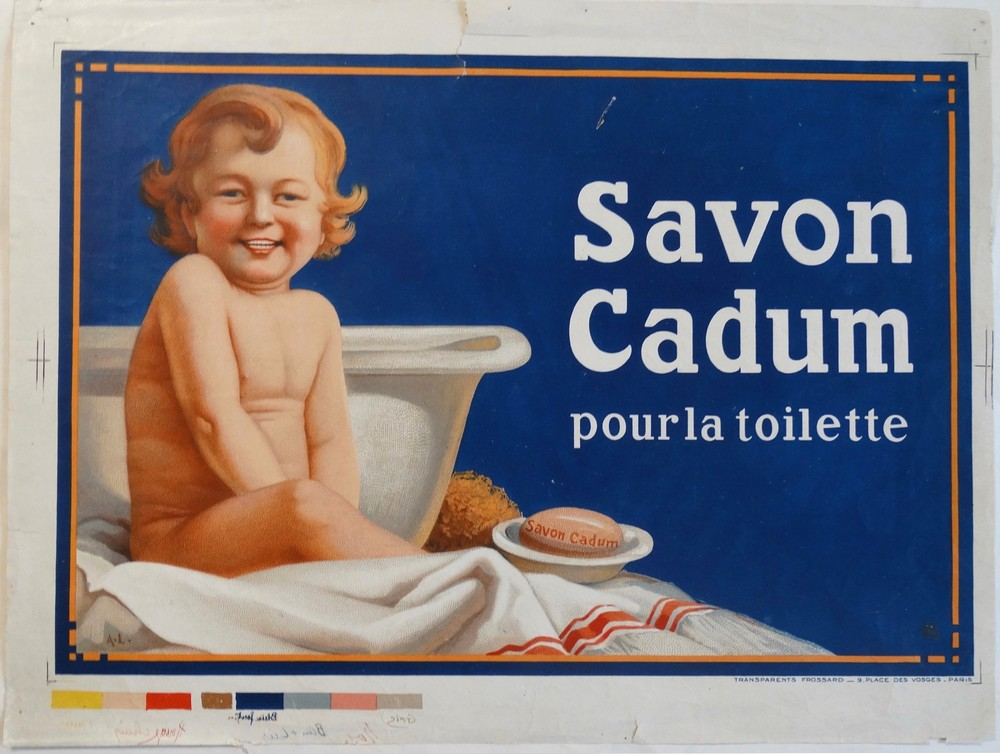
Cadum Baby poster, c.1912 - Collection Arsène Le Feuvre - Mairie de Sillé-le-Guillaume.

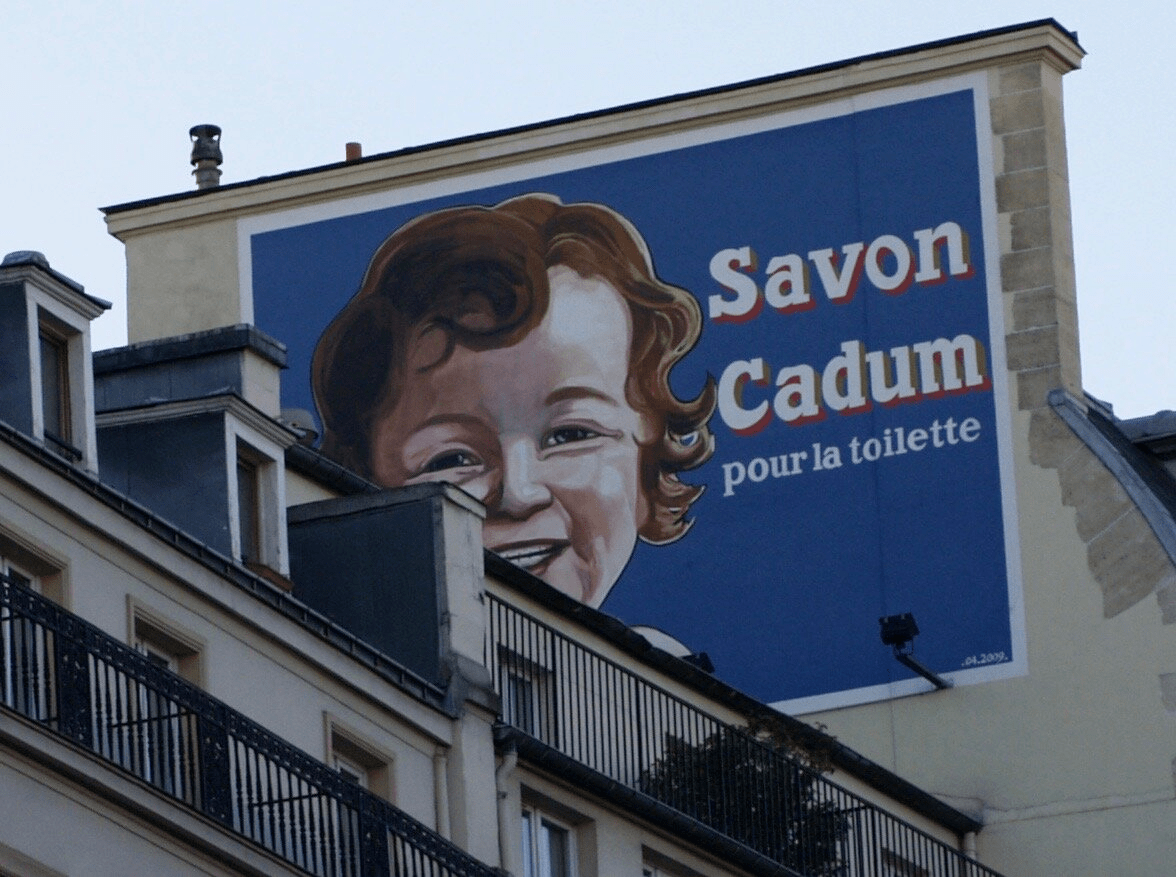
Advertising mural for Cadum soap on the Grands Boulevards in Paris.

American businessman Michaël Winburn was head of Omega Chemical Company, one of the USA's most important chemical businesses, and a PR magnate. In 1907 he suffered a major eczema attack whilst staying at the hôtel Scribe in Paris and decided to go to Louis Nathan, a famous Parisian apothecary, who made a balm based on oil of cade. It cured Winburn, who joined with Nathan to sell the balm commercially, giving it the name "Cadum". In 1909 the trademark Cadum appeared, supplying various ointments to relieve or cure skin problems.

During the same stay in Paris Winburn saw Le Feuvre's work while he was redecorating the grand salon of the hôtel where Winburn was staying. He was impressed and commissioned him to design posters for ointments and toothpastes in 1910. He was already prospering and did not need to take up Winburn's commission but still did so.

In 1912 Winburn put him in charge of the PR campaign for Cadum soap, offering him a vast studio in the heart of the business in Courbevoie. Le Feuvre declined and instead stayed in his Le Mans studio. The baby shown in the ensuing campaign was based on a terracotta bust of Arsène junior by Le Feuvre's sculptor uncle Alphonse, who had based the bust on photographs of the boy, Arsène junior himself (aged 27 by 1910), photographs from the family album and around one hundred sketches. In 1914 the baby made its true debut as a full-page black-and-white image in L'Illustration

After the First World War the baby appeared on most of the walls of Paris on posters, giant painted panels, advertising cartoons, and wall frescoes on major boulevards. In 1925 the world's largest poster was created, 17 metres high and covering 1000 square metres - it showed the baby's head three times and was posted on the hôtel Scribe for six months. The baby thus became a myth marking several generations.

In 1952 the Société Cadum merged with the Société Palmolive France, a branch of Palmolive USA, with the new entity named Cadum Palmolive then from 1964 Colgate-Palmolive. Ceded by Colgate-Palmolive in 2003, the Cadum trademark was acquired by the CDC Capital Investissement fund and was renamed Qualium in 2010. On 26 April 2012 L'Oréal acquired the société Cadum. The history was told in the 1998 documentary Bébé Cadum directed by Jean-François Comte and distributed by Tracol Film pour Planète.

=== Politician ===
From 29 March 1923 to 22 December 1925 he was elected deputy mayor of Le Mans. During the First World War he collaborated on much war work, including the creation of a studio to employ war widows, and served on a refugee committee.

In 1924 he was made first assistant to the mayor of Le Mans, Olivier Heuzé. Under the presidency of Le Feuvre as assistant delegate for fine arts, the musée de la Reine Bérengère opened on the day after Pentecost 1924, in a building bought the previous year from Monsieur Singher. In it one could see tapestries and locks from the Liger collection.

He was elected mayor of Le Mans on 23 December 1925. As mayor he focussed on improving views of and in the city and began clearing the Gallo-Roman enclosure. During his investigations he found a massive tower buried beneath dilapidated houses - that tower is now the municipal council hall. He moved forgotten collections into the prefecture within the former bishops' residence.

Supported by a general council vote, Le Mans' municipal council joined promenade des Jacobins to the parc de Tessé by partly removing rue Robert-Garnier (now allée Bouton), making it the city's first pedestrianised street. It also began clearing the area around the hôtel de ville and around the escalier des Ponts-Neufs, along with placing the floral clock in the haut du Tunnel.

On 15 February 1927 he led a tour of the future musée de Tessé for all the members of the fine arts commission and explained his plans for it, giving over the ground floor to paintings, the first floor to natural history, the garden level on the park side to mineralogy and sculpture, and the second floor to the learned societies' headquarters. The museum opened on 14 July the same year.

In 1929, whilst still mayor, he opened the "family placements in the country' for disabled children. He also began the city's four-day fair, initially on the Quinconces des Jacobins. In 1930 he moved the municipal library in the former offices of the Chappée factory, now home to the city archives. He also set up the city's September large street sale or 'braderie' before resigning as mayor on 15 December 1931.

=== Final years ===
On 23 January 1932 he was made curator of the musée de Tessé. On 20 April the same year he was made curator of all Le Mans' fine arts museum. Around the same time he founded the first women's labour union in Le Mans and the Chambre des métiers for Sarthe. He became its president and held the post until his death. He was buried in Le Mans' west cemetery.

Part of Arsène-Marie Le Feuvre's oeuvre were left to the town of Sillé-Le-Guillaume in 2010 by his granddaughter Muguette Le Feuvre-Louvrard. They are now held in two exhibition rooms in the château de Sillé le Guillaume.

== Awards ==
- 1895 - medal of honour at the Académie du Maine.
- 1896 - gold medal at the Exposition nationale et coloniale de Rouen.
- 1897 - academic palms at the regional and colonial exhibition in Rouen and gold medal for decorative designs for a church. In Paris, at the exhibition of work and new inventions, gold medal for decorative designs and for bedroom and dining room furniture.
- 1899 - honourable mention (architecture section) at the salon des artistes français for watercolours of the interior of Le Mans Cathedral
- 1900 - diploma of honour at the exposition universelle de Paris. At the exhibition he was awarded a bronze medal for designs for decorative sets and furniture.
- 1903 - officer of the Order of Public Education
- 1906 - medal and diploma of honour at the Milan International. From that year onwards he exhibited every year at the Salon des artistes français. He was a member of that learned society as both a painter and an architect.
- 1910 - diploma of honour at the Brussels International Exposition for a decorative panel on Gobelins fabric
- 1911 - diploma of honour at the Turin International for a decorative painting on Gobelin textile. He was a member of the French committee for overseas exhibitions.
- 1912 - Knight of the Legion of Honour, notably for his participation in the decorative arts section of the exposition de l'Ouest in Le Mans, in which he exhibited a watercolour design for the decoration and furniture of a bedroom and a design for a decorated bedroom ceiling.
- 1913 - first prize at the Ghent International Exposition in Ghent for two decorative panels.
- 1915 - first prize at the Franco-Moroccan Exhibition in Casablanca
- 1916 - special medal in Paris
- 1922 - special non-competition medal at the Ghent International Exhibition for two painted canvases imitating Gobelins textiles based on tapestries at the Louvre Museum
- 1923 - gold medal in Paris
- 1925 - two gold medals in Paris at the International Exhibition of Modern Decorative and Industrial Arts
- 16 May 1926 - promoted to officer of the Legion of Honour for services rendered at the International Exhibition the previous year.
- 1931 - honorary member of the admissions and installation committee (group XII - class 66) at the Paris Colonial Exposition, first prize for a decorative panel painted on Gobelins canvas.

== Bibliography (in French) ==
- Jean Arpentinier, Sarthe terre d'artistes, Peintres et graveurs 1460-1960, éditions de la Reinette, le Mans, 2001
- Jacky Beaufils (2012). Le Vieux Mans en 100 tableaux: Histoires de "petits maîtres" d'ici et d'ailleurs (in French). Mulsanne: ITF impr. ISBN 978-2-917900-36-9. BnF 43526261.
- E. Bénezit, « Arsène Le Feuvre », in Dictionnaire des peintres, sculpteurs, dessinateurs et graveurs, nouvelle édition entièrement refondue sous la direction de Jacques Busse, vol. 8, Gründ, Paris, 1999, p. 431
- Jean-Pierre Bodeaux; Michel Wlassikoff (1990). La fabuleuse et extraordinaire histoire du Bébé Cadum - image symbole de la publicité en France pendant un demi-siècle (in French). Paris: Syros-alternatives. ISBN 978-2-86738-467-7. BnF 35471484.
- Bertrand Coudreau, « Arsène Marie Le Feuvre dessine le Bébé Cadum (1863–1936) », in 72 célébrités sarthoises, Éditions du Petit Pavé, Brissac-Quincé, 2015, p. 237-240
- Gérard Blanchard, « Arsène-Le Feuvre, peintre décorateur et maire du Mans », in La Vie mancelle et sarthoise, No. 446, 2016, p. 8-11
- Jacques Feutrie, Roger Buchette, Pierre Guillermet, « Sillé-le-Guillaume, un bain de verdure », in La Vie mancelle et sarthoise, No. 325, mars-avril 1996, p. 11-18
- Marie Fourrier, "Arsène Le Feuvre, de l'art à la politique", in Revue historique et archéologique du Maine, 4e série – T. 22, Le Mans, 2022, p. 35-86
- Gil Galbrun-Chouteau, « Arsène Le Feuvre : peintre symboliste », Maine Découvertes, No. 33, juin / juillet / août 2002
- Sylvie Granger, Serge Bertin, « Bébé Cadum (début XXe). Le bébé aux trois papas (Sillé-le-Guillaume, Le Mans) », in Hommes en Sarthe acteurs de leur temps, Éditions libra Diffusio, 2015, p. 108-109
- Daniel Levoyer, « Les maires du Mans depuis 1900 », in La vie mancelle et sarthoise, No. 434, avril 2014, p. 2
- Alain Moeo, Histoires des maires du Mans, Mulsanne, I.T.F. Imprimeurs, 2006, 251 p.
- Emmanuèle Peyret, « Bébé Cadum mousse toujours », in Libération, 13 December 2006
- Claude Pressoir, « Bébé Cadum, 70 ans déjà », Cénomane, no 8, 1982, p. 60-65
- Claude Pressoir, « Portrait d'une femme sarthoise: La fille du Bébé Cadum », La vie mancelle et sarthoise, décembre-October 1995, p. 21
- Claude Pressoir, "Arsène-Marie Lefeuvre: le père du Bébé Cadum", in La vie mancelle et sarthoise, April 1996
- Pierre Sanchez, « Arsène Le Feuvre », in Dictionnaire des Indépendants. Répertoire des exposants et liste des œuvres présentées 1920-1950, vol. 2, Éditions de l'Échelle de Jacob, Dijon, 2008, p. 846-847
