= Maximilien-Auguste Bleickard d'Helmstatt =

Maximilien-Auguste Bleickard d'Helmstatt Count of Helmstatt
- Born: 28 August 1728; Nancy, Duchy of Lorraine
- Died: 10 July 1802 (aged 73); Neckarbischofsheim, Margraviate of Baden
- Spouse: Henriette-Louise de Laval-Montmorency (m.1747)
- Military career
- Allegiance: Holy Roman Empire; Kingdom of France
- Service years: 1746–1785
- Rank: Mestre de camp

Maximilien-Auguste Bleickard d'Helmstatt, Count of Helmstatt (28 August 1728 – 10 July 1802) was a German-born nobleman who served as a military officer in the army of the Kingdom of France. He was a representative of the Second Estate in the Estates General of 1789.

== Early life and military career ==
Helmstatt was born in Nancy, the son of Maximilien Bleickard and Eléonore Henriette de Poitiers. His parents purchased the county of Morhange in 1742. Helmstatt was recognised as a Freiherr of the Holy Roman Empire as Baron of Helmstatt, Count of Morhange, Lord of Hingsange and sovereign of Neckarbischofsheim.

He was granted citizenship of the Duchy of Lorraine by Stanisław Leszczyński on 17 September 1765 by letters of naturalisation; however, this nationality ceased to exist when the duchy was annexed to France by Louis XV in 1766.

He was a captain in the Barbançon cavalry regiment. In 1748, Helmstatt became a colonel of the Brittany cavalry regiment. In 1783 he became mestre de camp in the 3rd regiment of hussars.

== Estates General ==
On 30 March 1789 he was elected as a deputy of the nobility, for the bailiwick of Sarreguemines, in which capacity he attended the Estates General of 1789. At this stage, the Helmstatt family was deeply unpopular with their tenants and peasants, with the family's harshness recorded as the main grievance of their subjects. At the gathering of the Estates General from May 1789, Helmstatt aligned himself emphatically with the Ancien Régime and Louis XVI. He claimed that the reforms proposed by the Third Estate left him "without a voice" and he left Versailles in July 1789 to "take the waters" rather than participate in proceedings. He refused to join the reforming majority of the National Constituent Assembly and resigned as a deputy on 20 January 1790.

== Exile ==
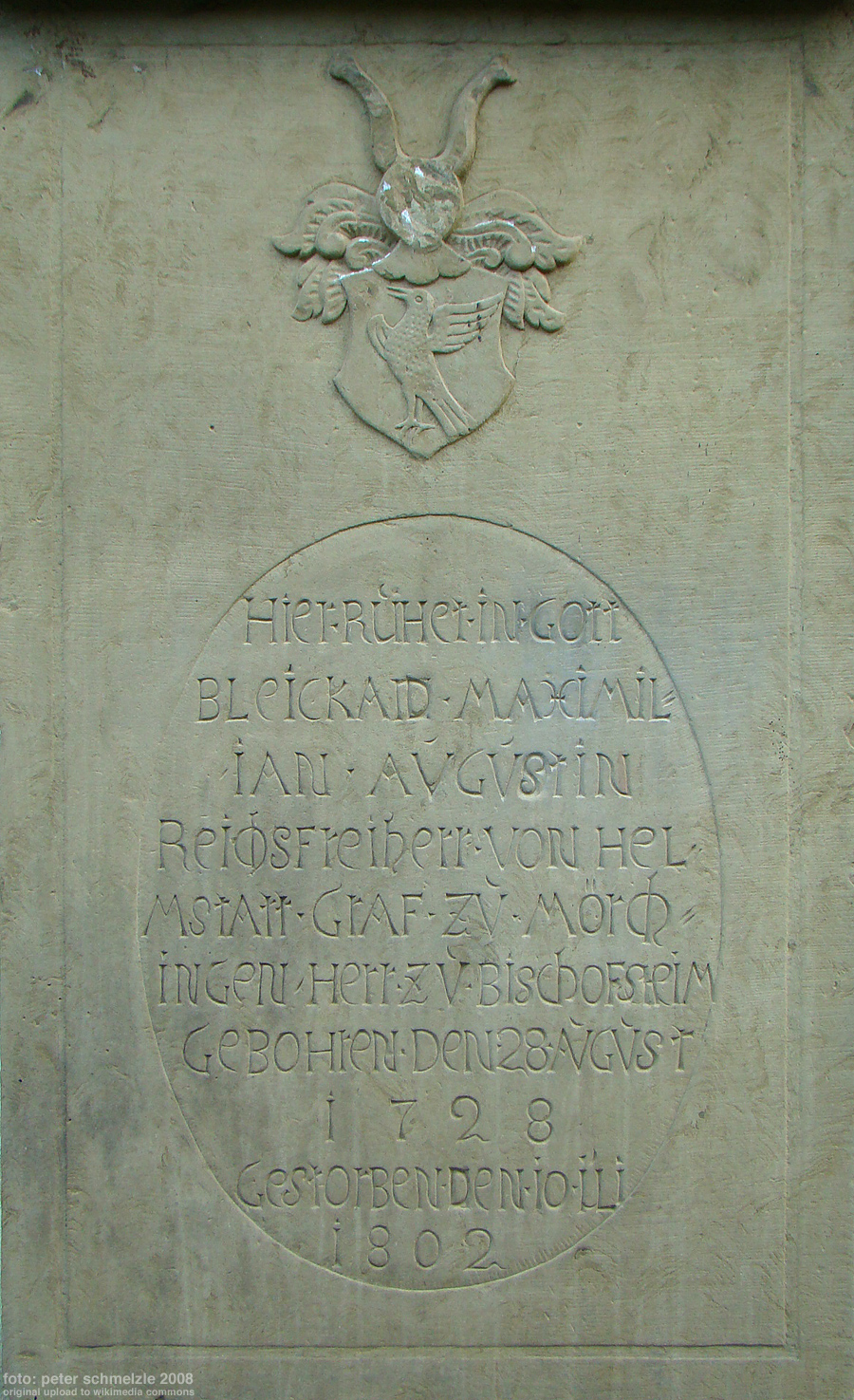
Helmstatt's epitaph

Later in 1790, Helmstatt emigrated with his family to his estate in Neckarbischofsheim in the Margraviate of Baden. On 4 September 1792, his name was put on a list of emigrants who had refused to return to France, and his property was sequestrated.

Under the terms of the Treaty of Lunéville in 1801, Helmstatt lost all of his French possessions without any territorial or financial compensation.

== Marriage ==
He married Henriette-Louise de Laval-Montmorency, daughter of Guy-Claude-Roland de Laval-Montmorency and Marie-Élisabeth de Rouvroy de Saint-Simon, on 12 March 1747 in Paris. Through his marriage, he was the brother-in-law of Marie-Louise de Laval-Montmorency. The couple had no children. Having no heirs, in 1773 Helmstatt adopted François Louis d'Helmstatt (1752–1841), a distant cousin of the German line of Oberöwisheim-Hochhausen.
