= Notre-Dame-du-Pré Church =

Church in France

Coordinates: 48°00′35″N 0°11′34″E

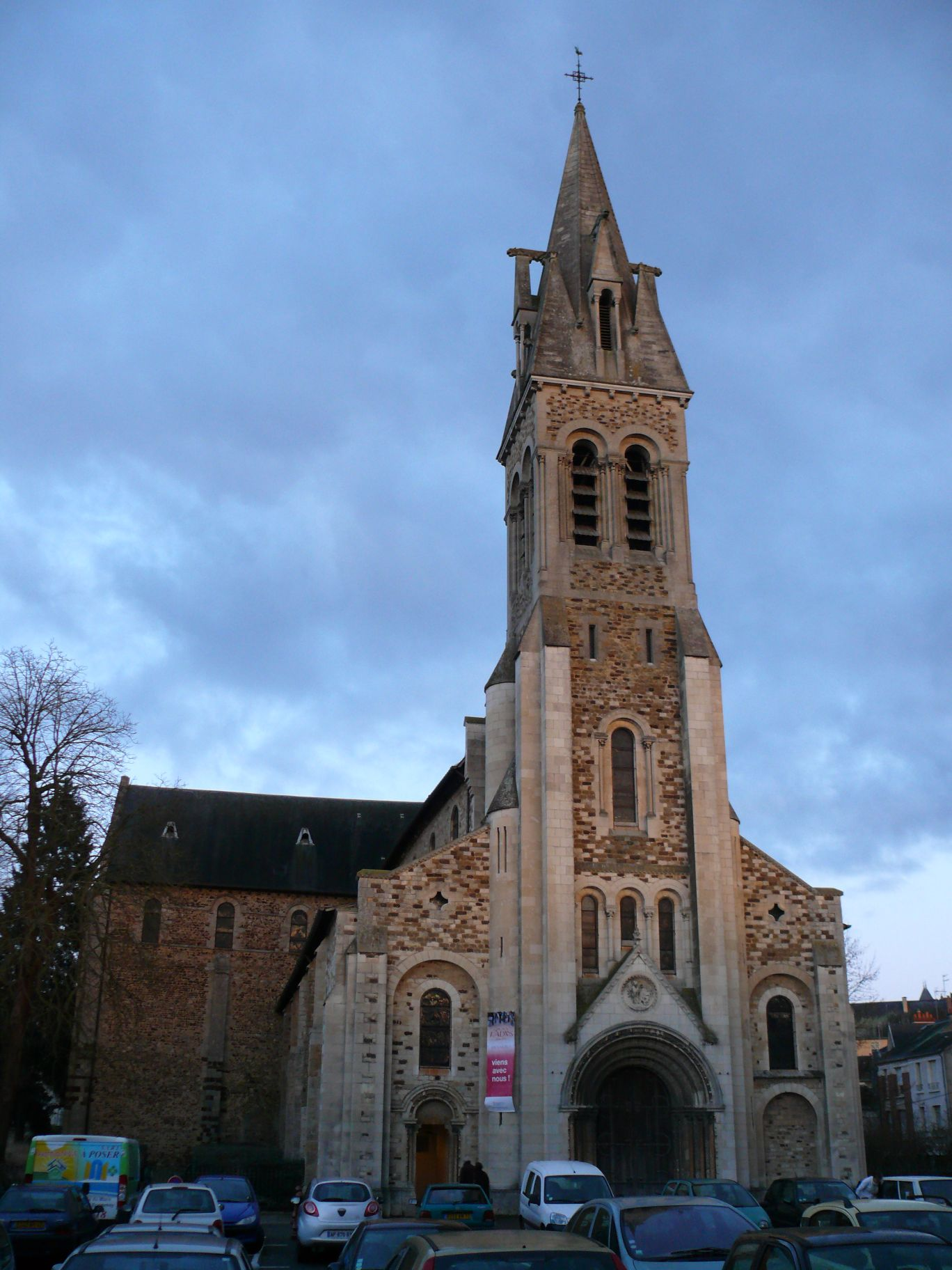

Notre-Dame-du-Pré is a Roman Catholic church in the du Pré district of Le Mans on the right bank of the river Sarthe.

== History ==
It was built on the ruins of an ancient oratory, which had according to tradition been built by Julian of Le Mans during his apostolate. The present choir is also over the crypt of a former monastery, which contained Julian's relics until they were moved to Le Mans Cathedral in 1835.

It was begun in the 11th century as abbey church to the Saint-Julien-du-Pré Abbey of Benedictine nuns. One of its abbesses was Catherine-Marie d'Aumont (died 1708), whilst one of its nuns was Marie-Louise de Laval-Montmorency, who left the nunnery to become abbess of Montmartre Abbey The church originally measured 10 by 58 metres, making it the city's third largest building at the time after the cathedral and the Abbey of Saint-Pierre de la Couture. The nave pillars alternate between round and square but all have Romanesque capitals.

At that time it was sited in an external suburb of the city. The choir opens out onto an ambulatory with three apsidal chapels. The north transept and the first crossing of the south transept were built at the same time, each with an apsidal chapel, along with part of the first bay of the nave.

Construction continued at the start of the 12th century, completing the church and meaning that it is entirely in the Romanesque style. A Gothic stone vault was added in the 15th century. In 1840 it was made a monument historique. There was a general restoration in the second half of the 19th century, concluded by adding a vast bell-tower in front of the façade, with its base acting as a porch.

The choir is slightly inclined to the right and is currently one metre higher than it was originally built. In 1950 Max Ingrand created stained glass windows and stations of the cross for the church.

== Gallery ==
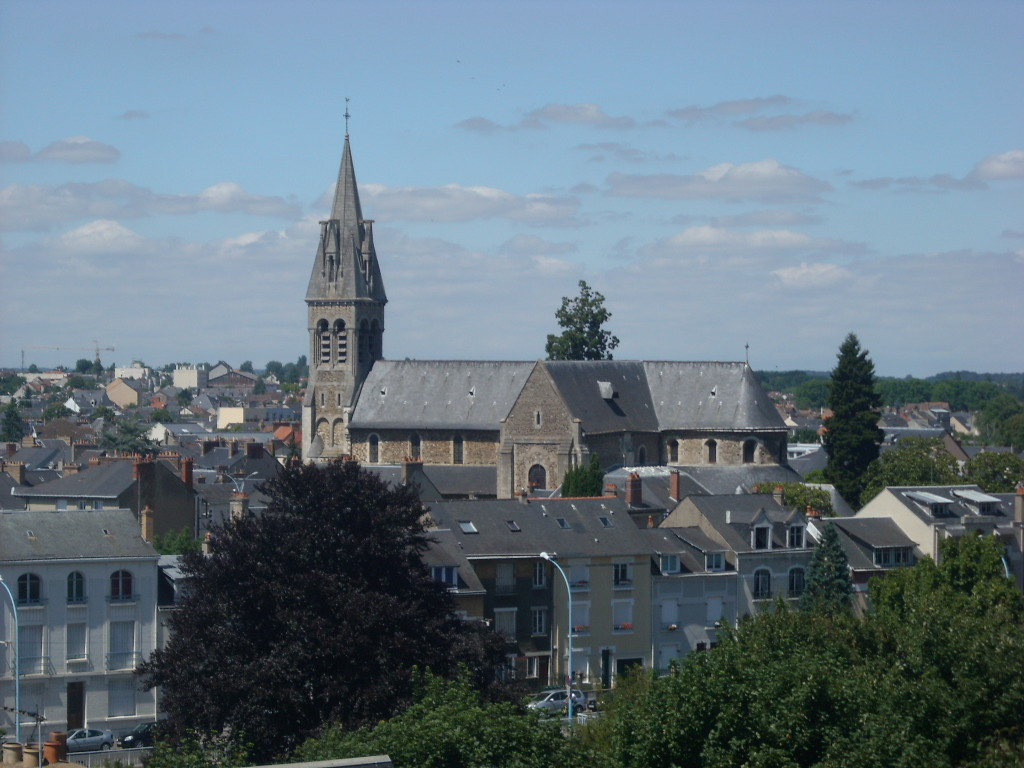
Overall view.

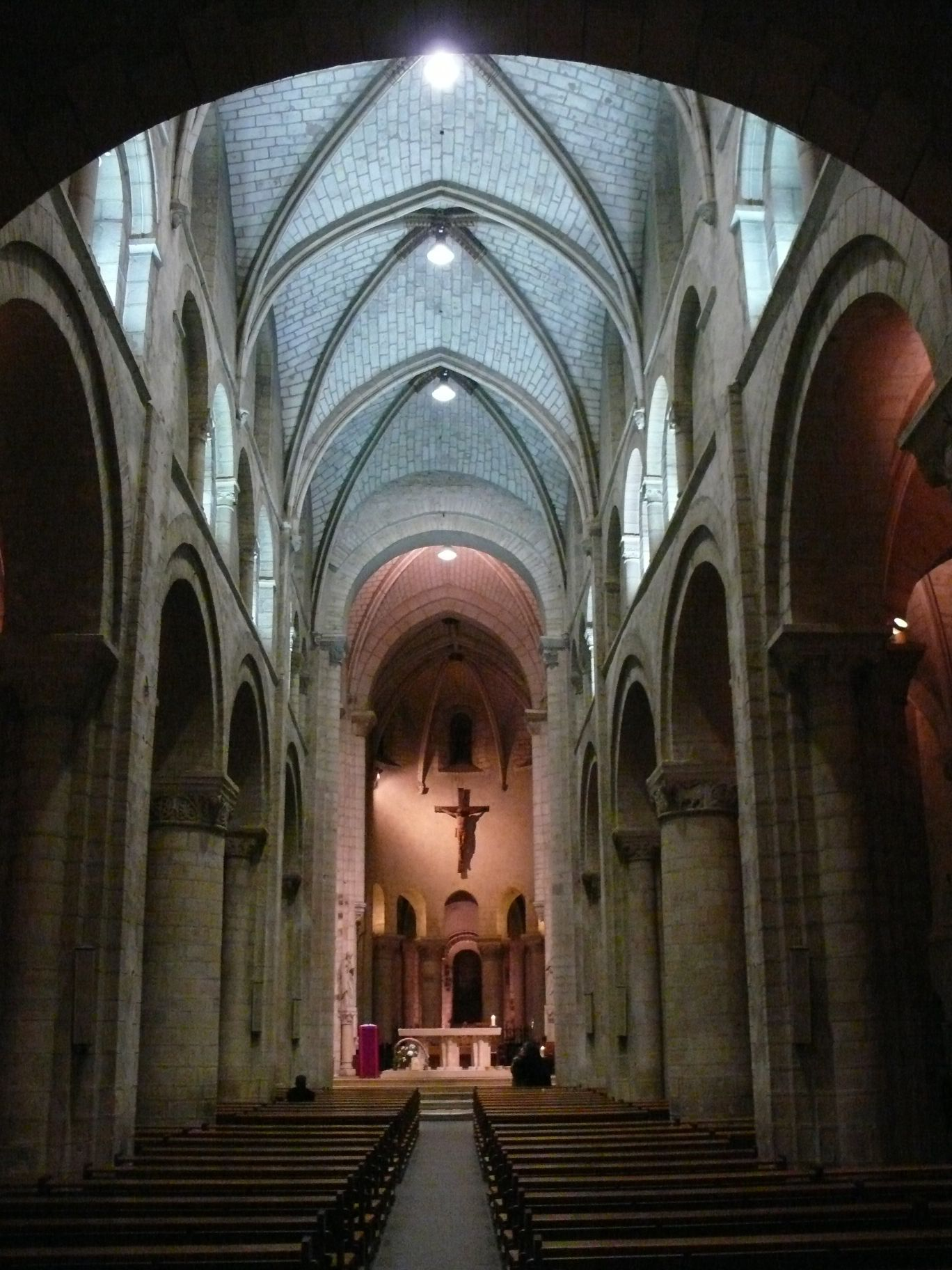
Nave.

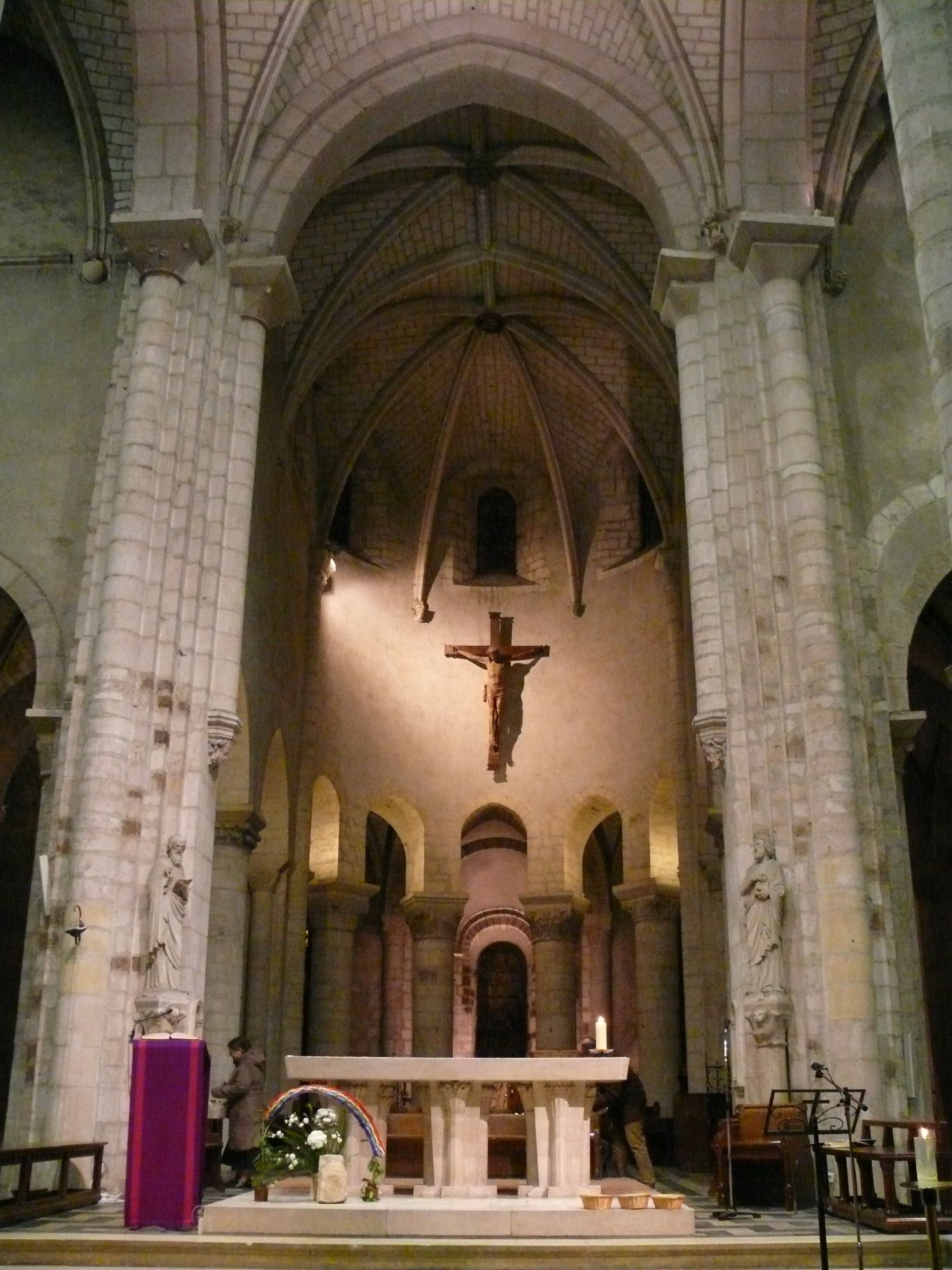
Choir.

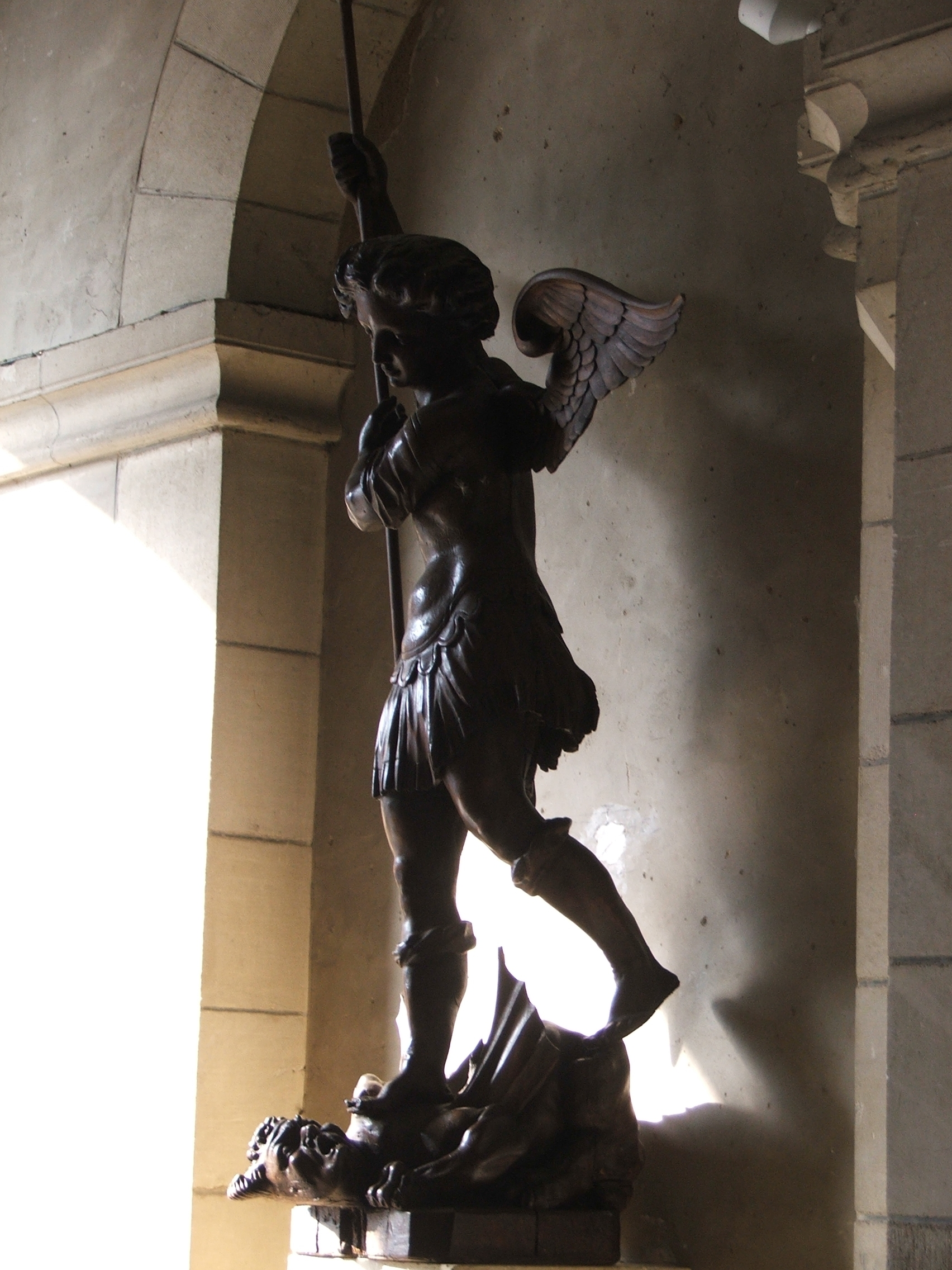
Statue of the Archangel Michael at the entrance.

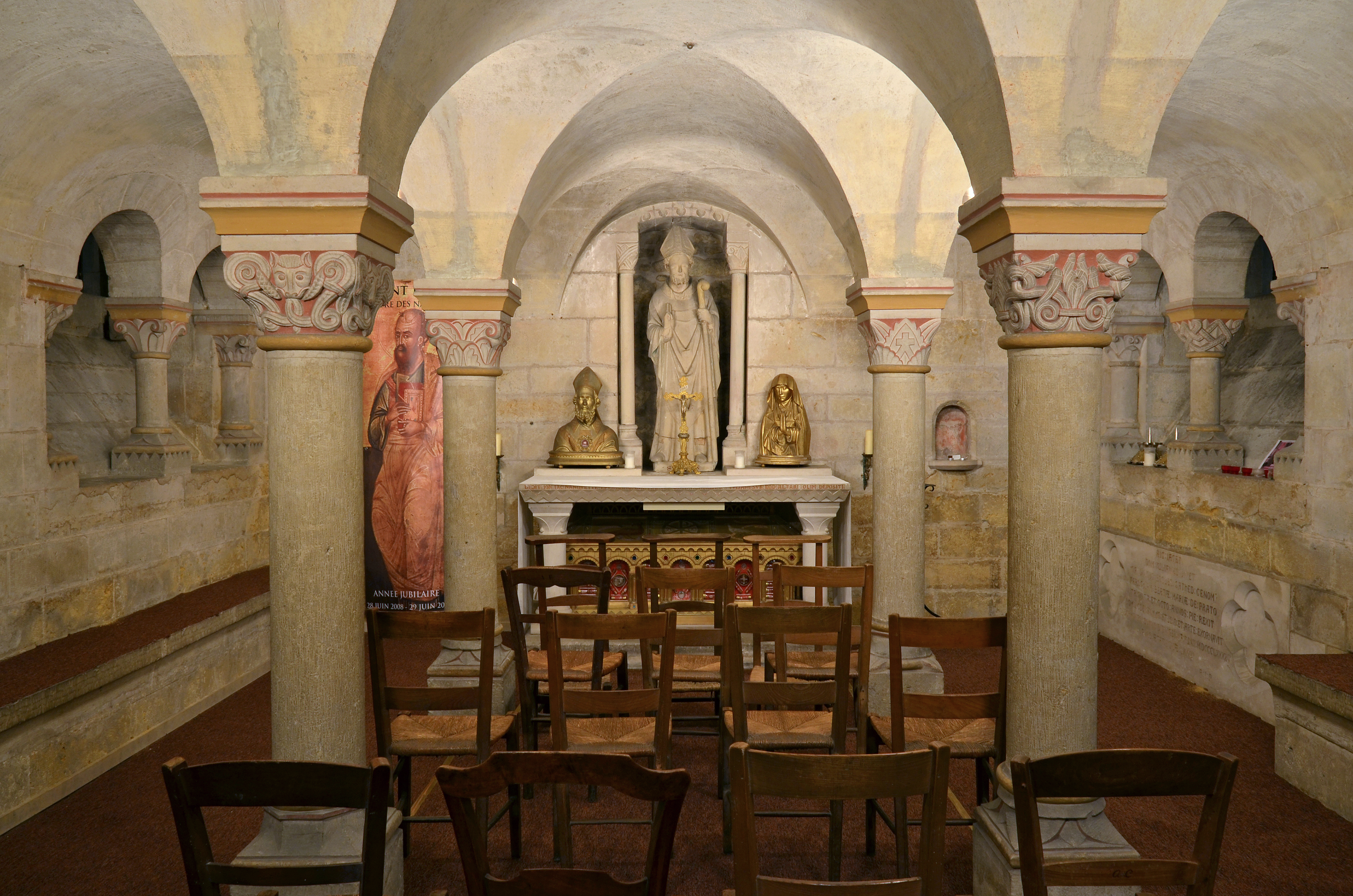
Crypt.

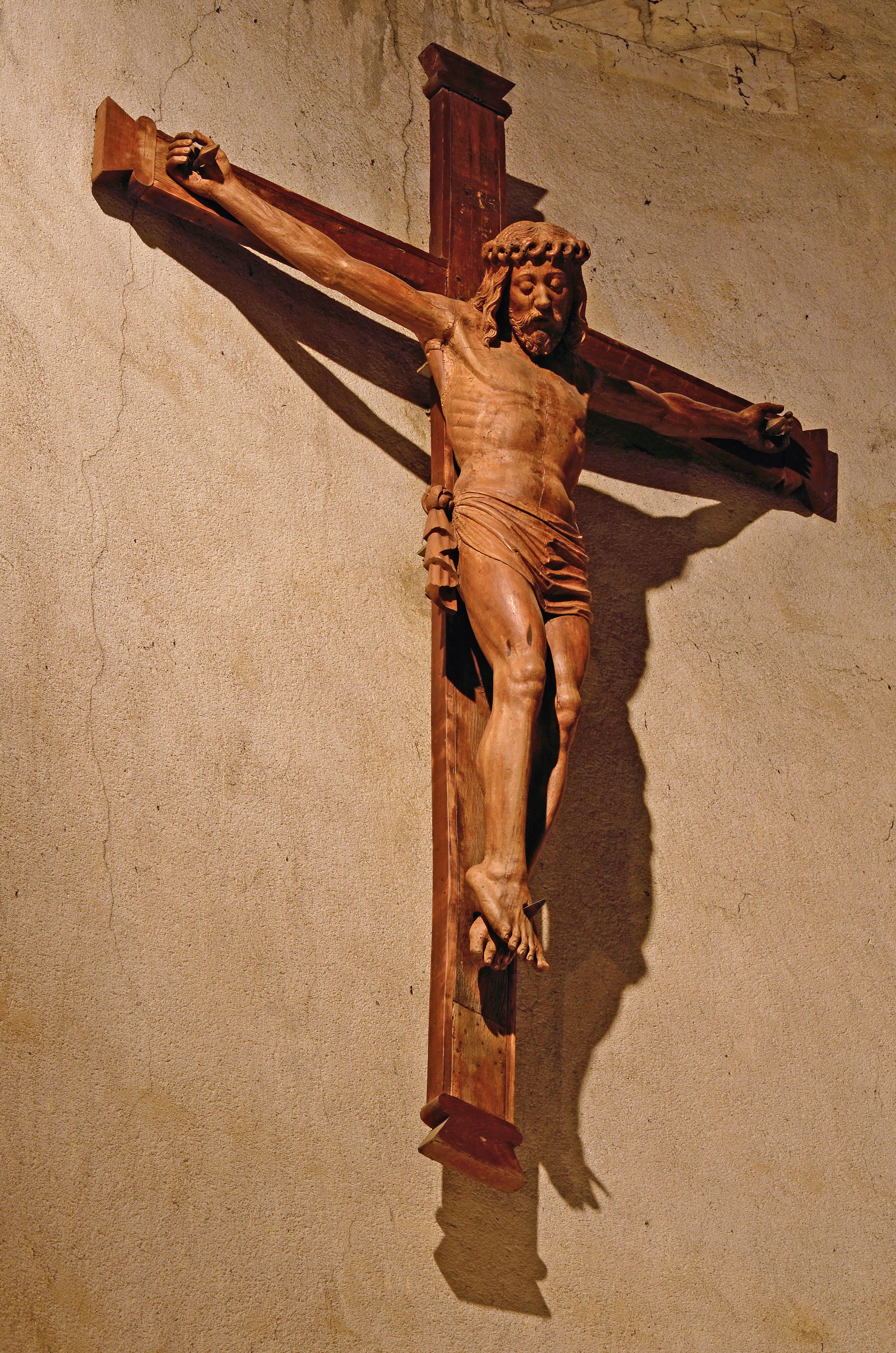
Christ on the cross.

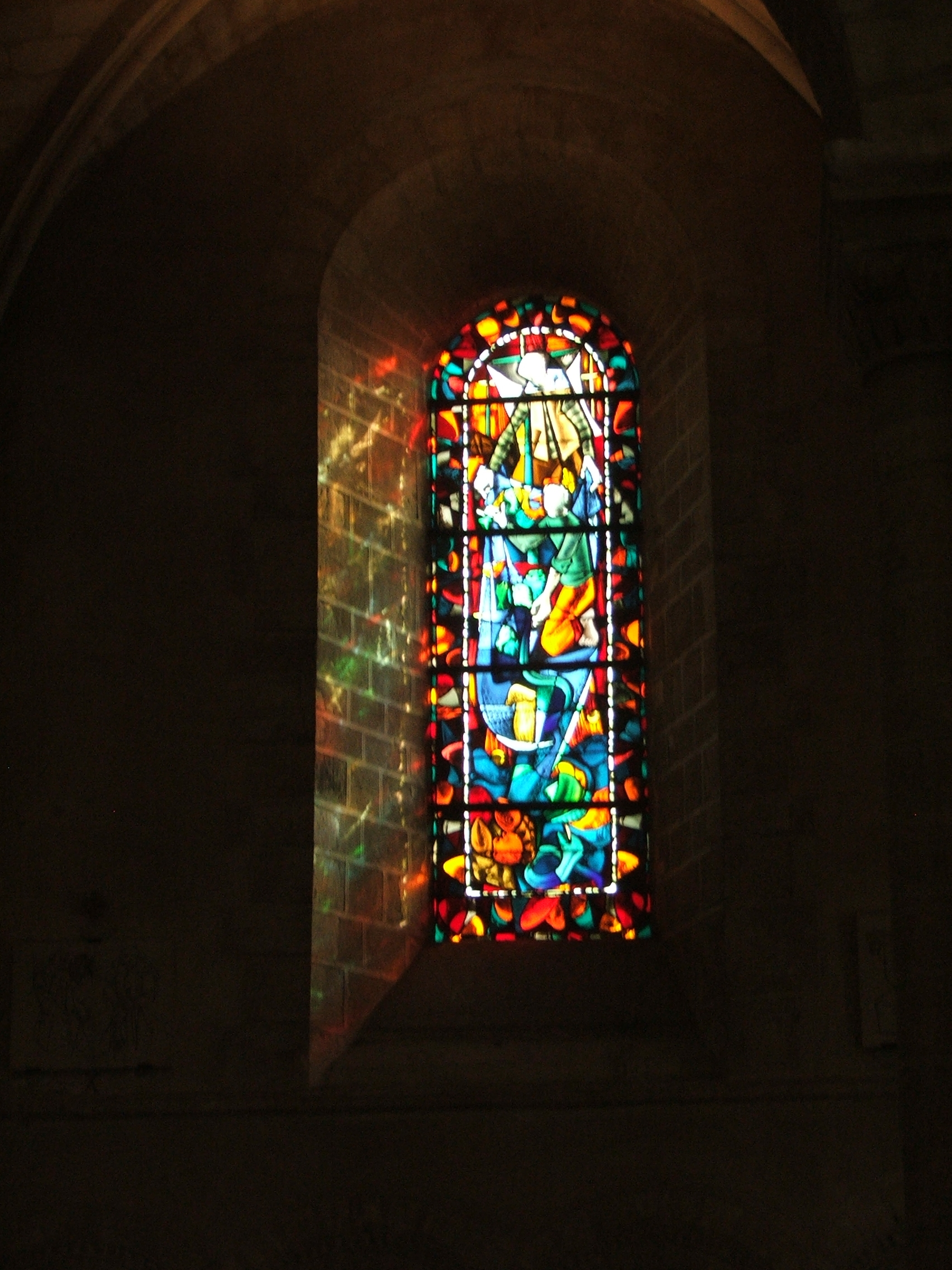
Stained glass.

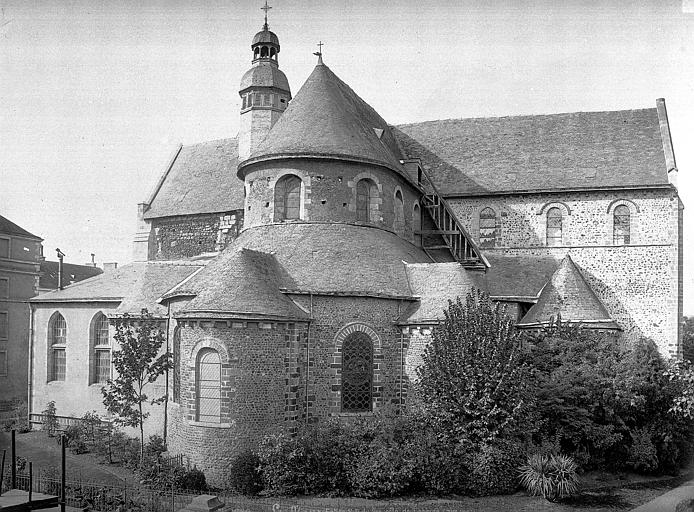
In 1881.

== Bibliography (in French) ==
- André Mussat, « L'église Notre-Dame-du-Pré au Mans », in Congrès archéologique de France. 119e session. Maine. 1961, Paris, Société française d'archéologie, 1961, p. 100–118
