= Guy-Claude-Roland de Laval-Montmorency =

French soldier and marshal of France (1677 – 1751)

Guy-Claude-Roland de Laval-Montmorency Count of Laval
- Born: 5 November 1677
- Died: 14 November 1751 (aged 74); Château de Châton
- Burial place: Parigné-l'Évêque
- Spouse: Marie-Élisabeth de Rouvroy de Saint-Simon (m.1722)
- Military career
- Allegiance: Kingdom of France
- Service years: 1677–1751
- Rank: Marshal of France
- Conflicts: Nine Years’ War; War of the Spanish Succession; War of the Austrian Succession

Guy-Claude-Roland de Laval-Montmorency, Count of Laval (5 November 1677 – 14 November 1751) was a French military officer and a marshal of France.

== Military career ==
Laval entered the Régiment du Roi as a second lieutenant in 1694. During the Nine Years’ War he was present at the Vignamont march, the bombardment of Brussels and the capture of Ath. Laval was made a captain in the Régiment du Roi on 17 February 1701.

In 1702 he raised the Laval regiment (1702-1705) for participation in the War of the Spanish Succession. On 4 March 1705 he was made a lieutenant-colonel of the regiment of Bourbon. He served in the attack on the lines of Wissembourg, marched from there to the army of Dauphiné and took part in the capture of Soncino and Montmélian. At the siege of Nice in 1705–6 he received two bullet wounds. He was on the attack lines during the Battle of Turin and was present at the lifting of the siege of Toulon on 22 August 1707. In 1709 he was in the French army of Flanders and had his left hand crushed by a shrapnel from a bomb during the Siege of Tournai. On 29 March 1710 he was appointed a brigadier and he distinguished himself in the attack on the fort of Arleux.

On 10 July 10, 1712, Laval defeated a corps of three thousand men near Valenciennes. He fought at the Battle of Denain, at the capture of Marchiennes and Douai, and at the siege of Le Quesnoy, of which he had command after the capture. He took part in the surrender of Speyer, Worms and Kaiserslautern, as well as the siege of Landau and capture of Freiburg im Breisgau in 1713.

On 1 February 1719, Laval was made a maréchal de camp by Louis XV. On 23 January 1722 he was appointed governor of Philippeville.

During the War of the Polish Succession, Laval was in the Army of the Rhine and was present at the Siege of Philippsburg. He then marched to the siege of Worms. He was created lieutenant-general of the armies of the king. In the War of the Austrian Succession, he commanded forces in Lorraine in 1744, and obtained the government of Béthune on 20 September that year. On 17 September 1747 Laval was named a marshal of France.

He died on 14 November 1751 at the Château de Châton and was buried in the church of Parigné-l'Évêque.

== Family and marriage ==
Laval was the son of Gabriel II de Laval-Tartigny and Renée Barbe de la Forterie, daughter of Claude Barbe de la Forterie. He was a direct descendant of Matthew II of Montmorency.

On 29 June 1722, Laval married Marie-Élisabeth de Rouvroy de Saint-Simon (1698–1762), daughter of Eustache-Titus de Rouvroy, Marquis de Saint-Simon, a brigadier of the king's armies. Marie-Élisabeth was a cousin of Louis de Rouvroy, duc de Saint-Simon, who had become her adoptive father following the death of Eustache-Titus.

Together, Laval and Marie-Élisabeth had six children, three of whom reached adulthood:

- Marie-Louise de Laval-Montmorency (1723–1794), last Abbess of Montmartre, who was guillotined during the French Revolution
- Gui-Claude-Louis de Laval-Montmorency (1724–1726)
- Cyprien-Jacques-Roland de Laval-Montmorency (1725)
- Charles Louis de Laval-Montmorency (1727)
- Joseph-Pierre de Laval-Montmorency (1729–1757), Count of Laval from 1751 and brigadier general who died at the Battle of Hastenbeck
- Henriette-Louise de Laval-Montmorency (1733–1811), married Maximilien-Auguste Bleickard d'Helmstatton 18 March 1747
