= Jean Auguste de Chastenet de Puységur =

French Catholic bishop (d. 1815)

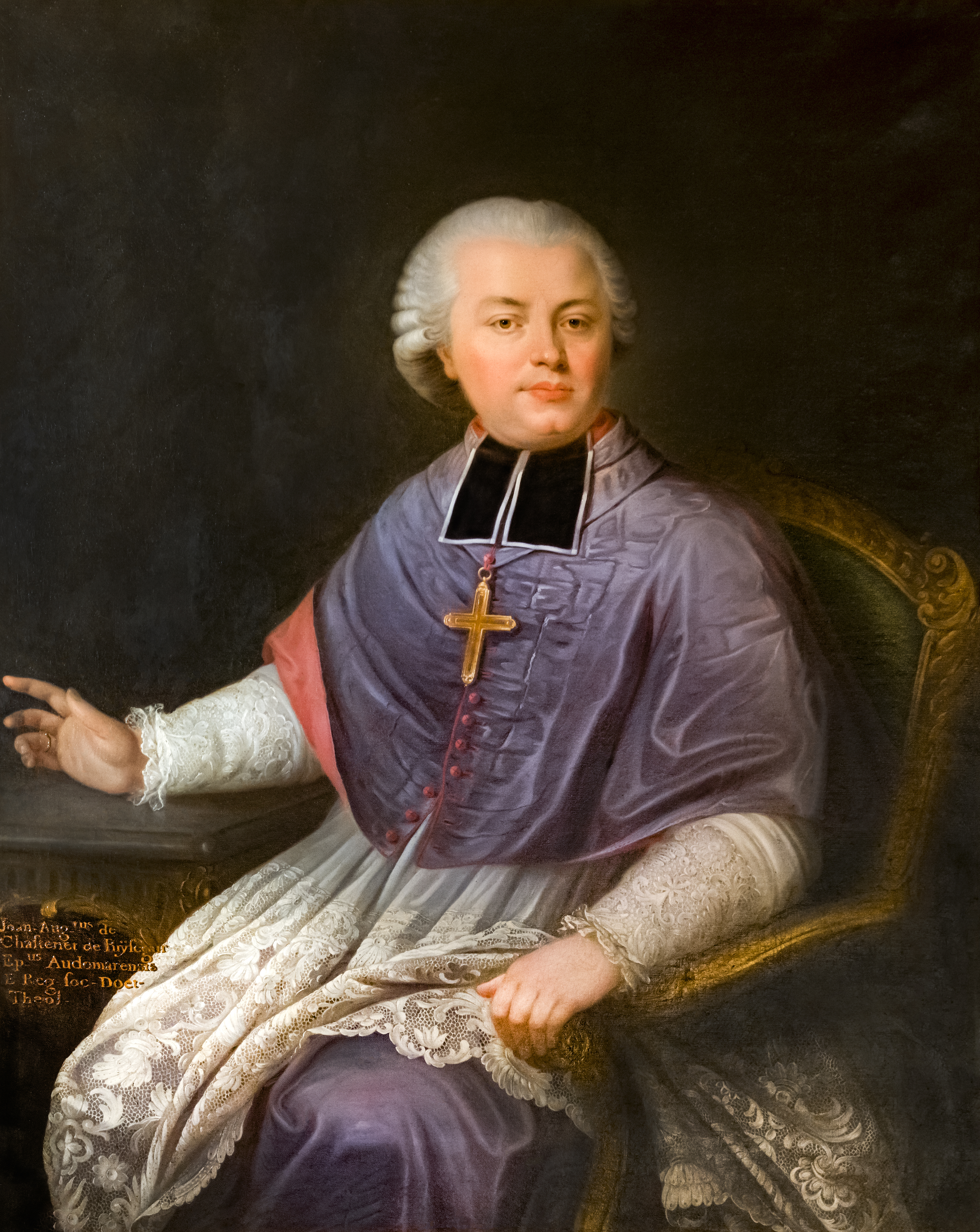
Mons. Chastenet de Puységur, Bishop of Bourges, 1780 (Musée du Pays Rabastinois, Rabastens, Tarn)

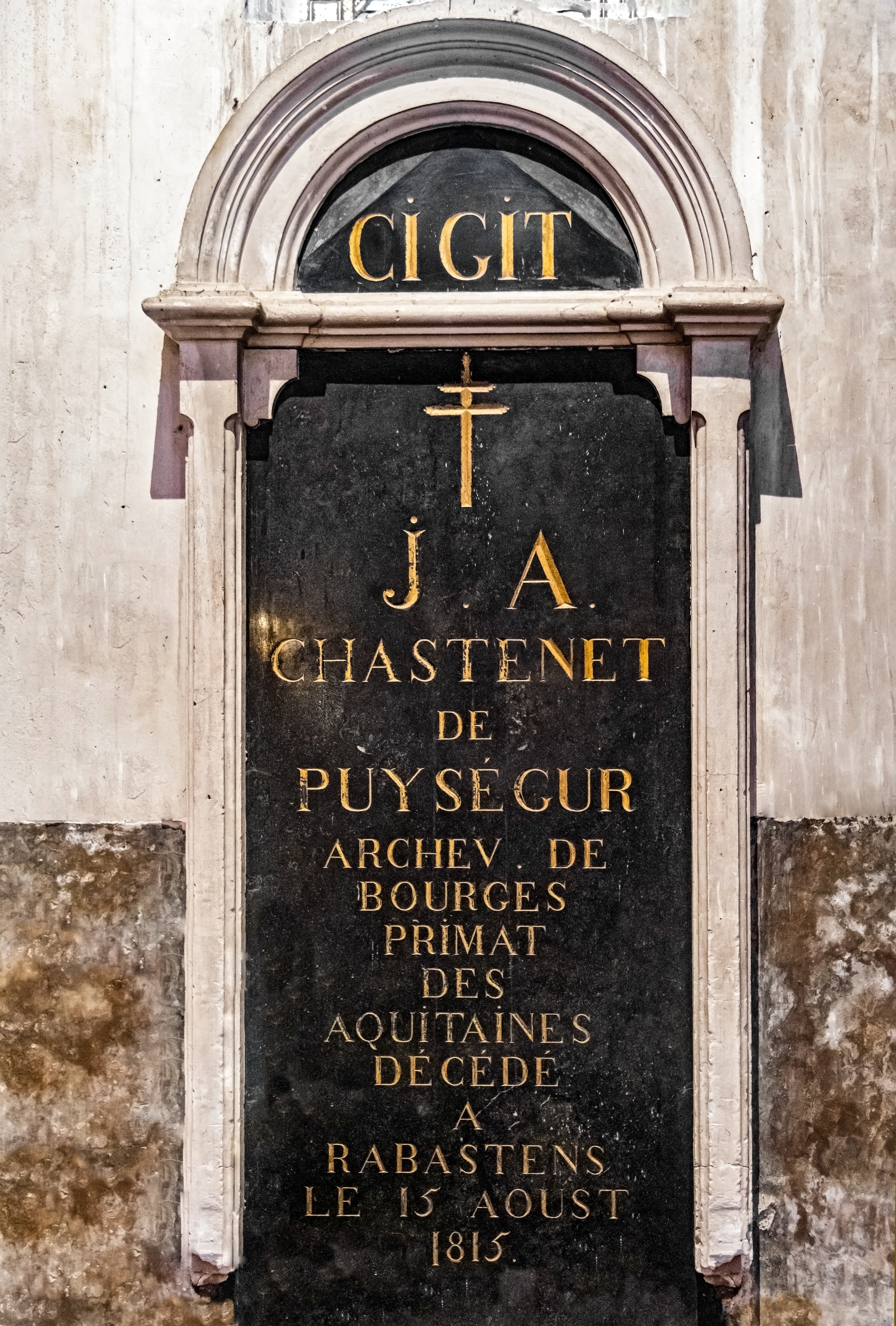
Chastenet's grave in Church Notre-Dame-du-Bourg de Rabastens

Jean Auguste de Chastenet de Puységur (11 November 1740 – 14 August 1815, Rabastens) was a French Catholic bishop.

He was named bishop of Saint-Omer on 29 June 1775, then bishop of Carcassonne in 1778. In 1788, he became the Archbishop of Bourges. A deputy to Estates-General of 1789, on the French Revolution he emigrated to Wolfenbüttel, where he lived with the archbishop of Rheims, Talleyrand-Périgord. The 1801 Concordat between France and the Pope forced him to resign, but allowed him to return to Rabastens, where he then lived until his death.
