= Montmartre Abbey =

Abbey in Paris

Coordinates: 48.888°N 2.340°E

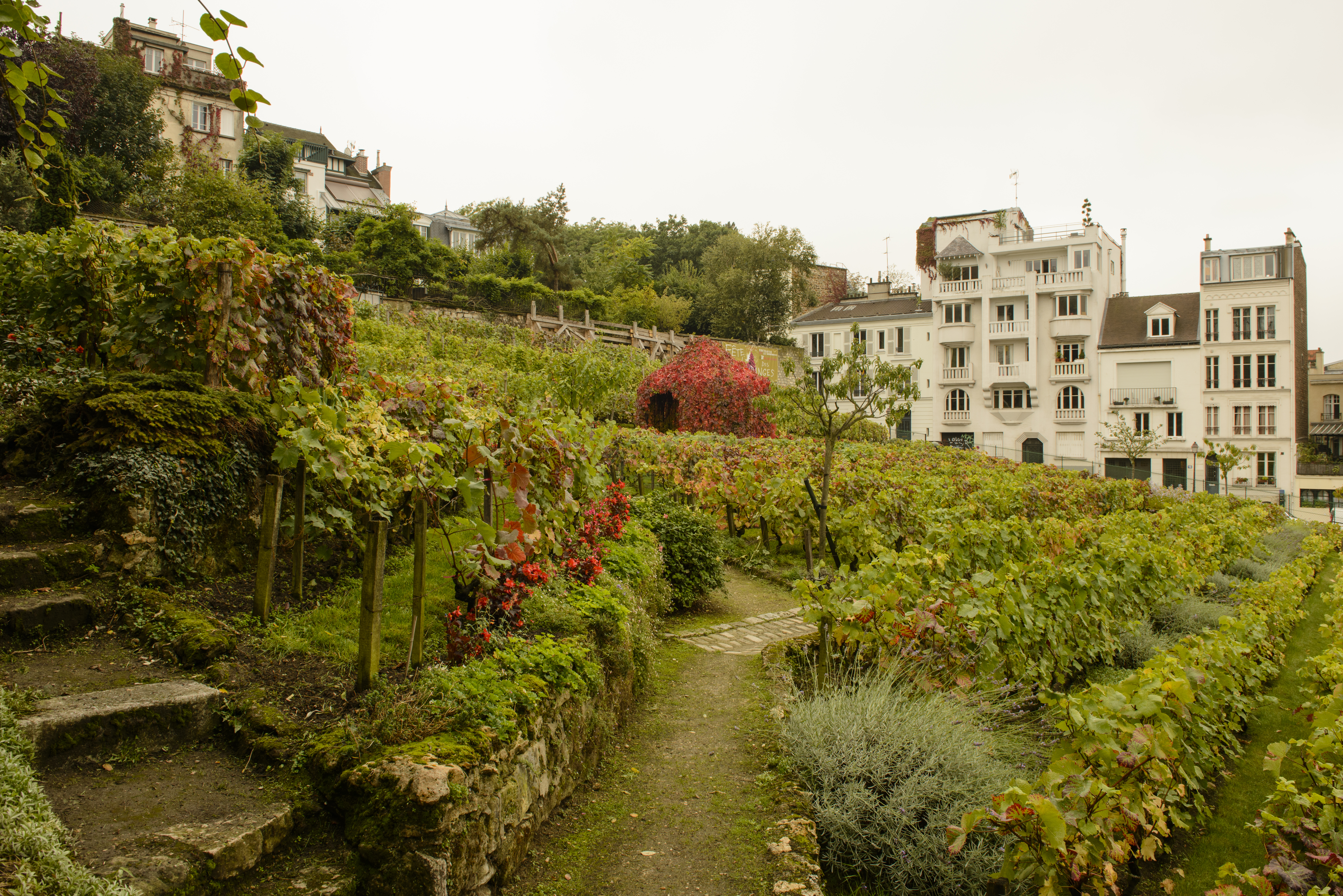
The Montmartre vineyard - all that remains of the abbey

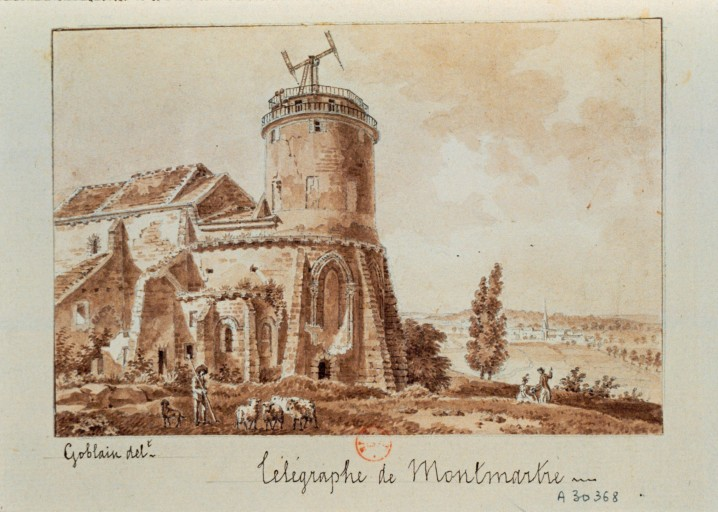
A 19th-century pen and wash drawing of the adjoining church by Antoine-Louis Goblain

Montmartre Abbey (French: Abbaye de Montmartre) was a 12th-century Benedictine nunnery established in the Montmartre district of Paris within the Diocese of Paris.

In 1133, King Louis VI purchased the Merovingian church of Saint Peter of Montmartre in order to establish the abbey and in the process to rebuild the church. The restored church was consecrated by Pope Eugenius III in 1147, in a splendid royal ceremony during which Bernard of Clairvaux and Peter, Abbot of Cluny, acted as acolytes.

The abbey was suppressed in 1790, sold in 1794 and demolished during the French Revolution, but its church, Saint-Pierre de Montmartre, survived as the parish church of Montmartre, the oldest church in Paris, now all that remains of the abbey except for a vineyard. The last abbess, Marie-Louise de Laval-Montmorency, was guillotined during the Reign of Terror.

== See also ==
- List of Benedictine monasteries in France
