= Louis-Gabriel Pambo =

Gabonese politician

Louis-Gabriel Pambo is a Gabonese politician. As of 2009, he is the National Secretary of the Environment, Forestry, Fisheries, Tourism and Sustainable Development for the ruling Gabonese Democratic Party (Parti démocratique gabonais, PDG).
