= Louis-Gabriel Moreau =

French painter

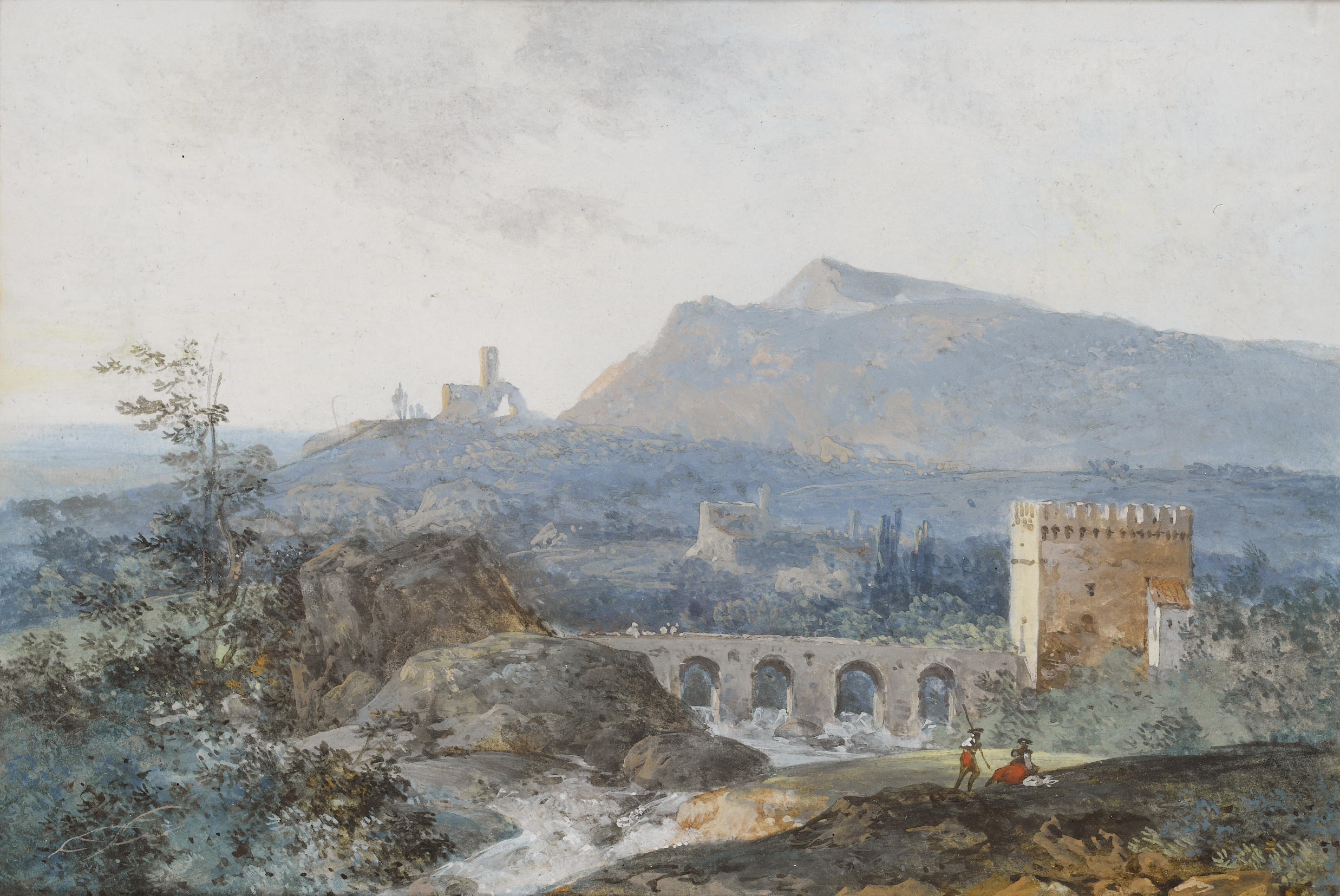
- Paysage avec un aqueduc Before The Revolution Moreau became known, in particular, for melancholy paintings of landscapes and ruins in and around Paris
- Born: early in 1740; Paris, France
- Died: 12 October 1806 (aged 65–66); Paris, France
- Occupations: Artist (mainly landscapes); Conservator/restorer (Louvre)

Louis-Gabriel Moreau (1740 – 12 October 1806) was a French graphic artist and landscape painter.

He is frequently identified as "Moreau the elder" ("Moreau l’Aîné") in order to avoid confusion with his precocious younger brother, the artist Jean-Michel Moreau (1741–1814) who is sometimes identified as "Moreau the younger" ("Moreau le Jeune").

== Life ==
Moreau was born in Paris. He was a pupil of Pierre-Antoine Demachy. Like Demachy, Moreau would focus on paintings of buildings and the countryside in and around Paris. He painted generally in gouache. Moreau's work was first exhibited in 1760 at the "Exposition de la Jeunesse". He was accepted into the Académie de Saint-Luc, but failed to gain admission to the Royal Academy of Painting and Sculpture in 1787 and again in 1788, possibly because the academy did not share Moreau's preference for landscapes. He worked as an artist for the Count of Artois as a result of which for several years Moreau lived in the Louvre, which at the time was undergoing a protracted transition towards its subsequent status as a public museum and gallery. While living here he continued to produce romanticised images of ruins until the outbreak of the revolution. Following the outbreak of revolution the Louvre finally reopened as a public museum, formally in 1793, and Moreau continued to work there on conservation and restoration.

There are those who have identified similarities between the work of Louis-Gabriel Moreau and of Claude-Louis Châtelet, one of the Queen's favourite artists.

== Works exhibited in public galleries (not a complete list) ==
- Louvre, Paris
  - Paintings
    - Paysage. Cabane dans un bois
    - Vue des coteaux de Bellevue prise du parc de Saint Cloud
    - Vue du château de Vincennes prise des hauteurs de Montreuil
  - Drawings
    - Intérieur d'un parc sauvage
    - La Promenade
    - Vue du château de Valençay, et au premier plan des promeneurs
    - Vue du château de Valençay, prise des terrasses, et couple de promeneurs
  - Miniatures
    - Le Parc de Saint-Cloud, Paris, musée du Louvre, département des Arts graphiques
    - Le Portique : plusieurs personnages pénétrant sous un portique, Paris, musée du Louvre, département des Arts graphiques
- Magnin Museum, Dijon
    - L’Allée
    - Paysage, effet de soir tombant
- Fine Arts Museum, Rouen
    - Paysage au grand fleuve
