= Guillaume-Antoine Delfaud =

French Jesuit

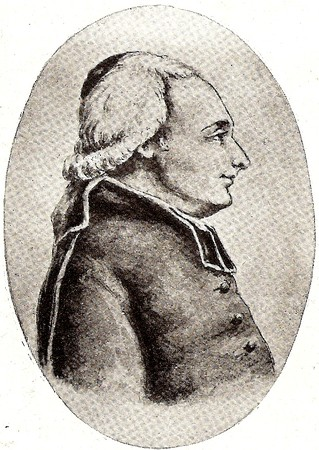
Guillaume-Antoine Delfaud

Guillaume-Antoine Delfaud (1733–1792) was a French Jesuit.
