= Marie-Louise de Laval-Montmorency =

French noblewoman and last Abbess of Montmartre

Mother Marie-Louise de Laval-Montmorency
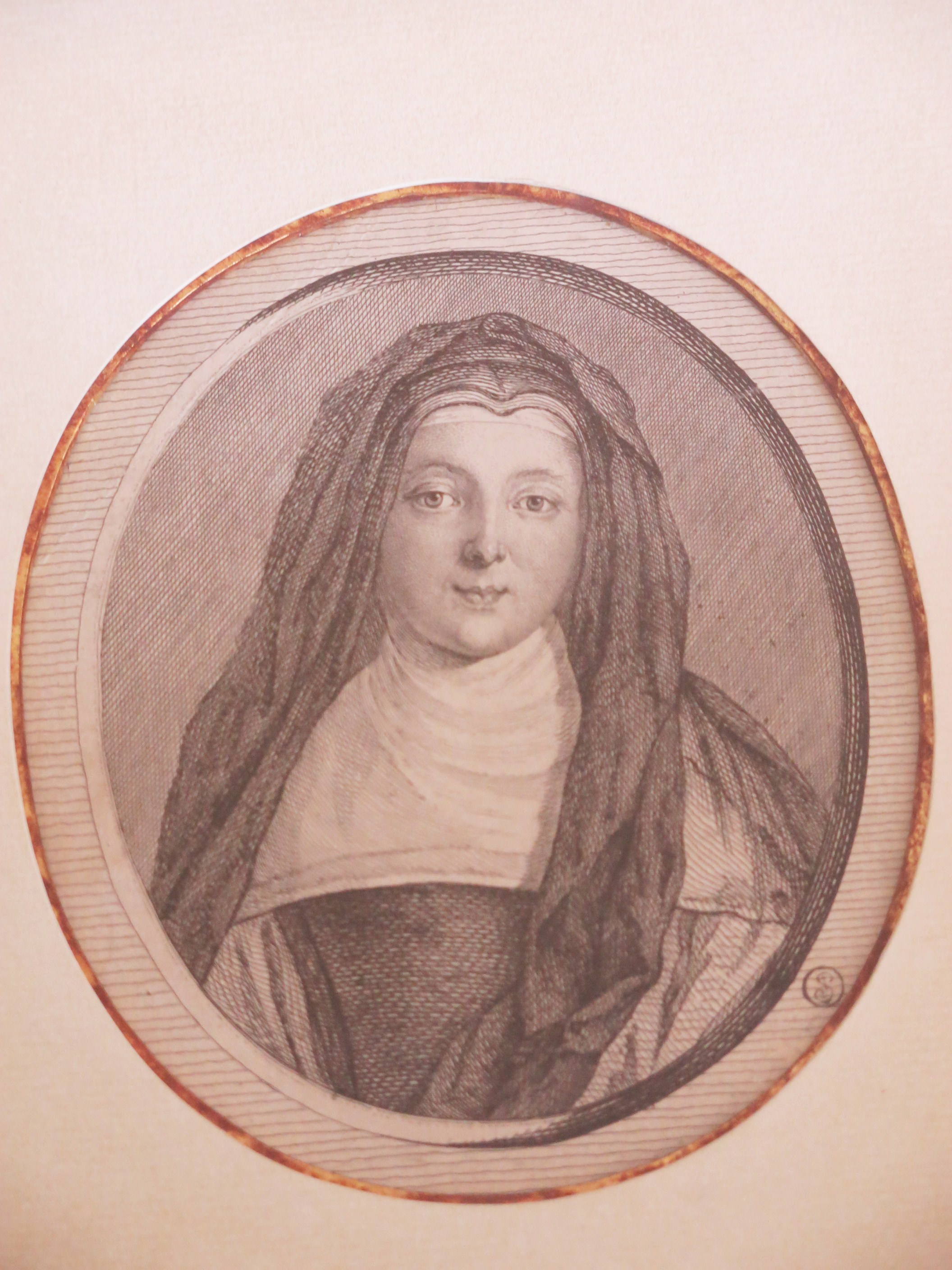

Personal life
- Born: 31 March 1723
- Died: 24 July 1794 (aged 71) Barrière du Trône, Paris, France
- Cause of death: Guillotined
- Resting place: Picpus Cemetery, Paris, France
- Known for: Last Abbess of Montmartre Abbey

Religious life
- Religion: Christianity
- Denomination: Roman Catholic
- Order: Benedictines

Marie-Louise de Laval-Montmorency (31 March 1723 – 24 July 1794) was a French noblewoman and nun who was the last Abbess of Montmartre. She was guillotined in the final days of the Reign of Terror during the French Revolution.

== Biography ==
Marie-Louise was the eldest child of Guy-Claude-Roland de Laval-Montmorency and Marie-Élisabeth de Rouvroy de Saint-Simon. She was a descendant of Matthew II of Montmorency. As an adolescent, she took orders.

In 1759, Marie-Louise was a nun at the abbey church of Notre-Dame-du-Pré in Le Mans; her mother became a boarder at this convent in 1760 until her death in 1762. She subsequently became a sister and later abbess of the Benedictine Montmartre Abbey.

On 16 August 16, 1792, the abbey was suppressed by the French revolutionary authorities and the nuns of Montmartre were ordered to leave their abbey. Marie-Louise retired to the Basilica of Saint-Denis with nine of her nuns, but afterwards found temporary asylum at the Château de Bondy with Anne Emmanuel de Crussol d'Amboise. By this stage, Marie-Louise was deaf, blind and paralyzed. Despite her infirmities and age, she was arrested and imprisoned by the revolutionaries in Saint-Lazare Prison. In the final days of the Reign of Terror, she was condemned to death by the Revolutionary Tribunal for having "deafly and blindly" plotted against the republic. Her sibling, Henriette-Louise, and her cousin, Louis-Joseph de Montmorency-Laval, had already fled France for exile abroad.

Marie-Louise de Laval-Montmorency was guillotined on 24 July 1794 (5 Thermidor Year II) at the Barrière du Trône in Paris. She was buried in the Picpus Cemetery.
