= Henri-Cardin-Jean-Baptiste d'Aguesseau =

French advocate and minister (1752–1826)

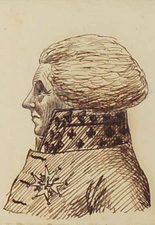

marquis d'Aguesseau
- In office 1817–1826

Personal details
- Born: 23 August 1747
- Died: 22 January 1826 (aged 78)
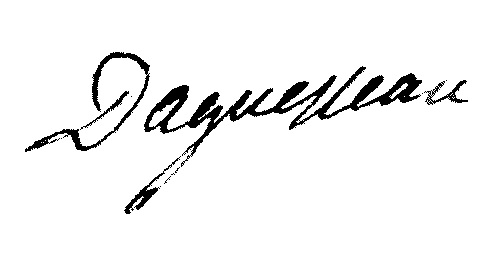
- Signature

Blason of Henri Cardin Jean-Baptiste d'Aguesseau

Henri-Cardin-Jean-Baptiste d'Aguesseau, marquis d'Aguesseau (23 August 1747 – 22 January 1826), grandson of the French chancellor Henri François d'Aguesseau, was advocate-general in the parlement of Paris and deputy in the Estates-General. Under the Consulate he became president of the court of appeal and later minister at Copenhagen. He was elected to the Académie française in 1787.

== Works ==
Of d'Aguesseau's works the most complete edition is that of the eminent lawyer Jean Marie Pardessus, published in 16 vols. (1818–1820); his letters were edited separately by Rives (1823); a selection of his works, (OEuvres choisies, was issued, with a biographical notice, by E Falconnet in 2 vols. (Paris, 1865).)

The far greater part of his works relate to matters connected with his profession, but they also contain an elaborate treatise on money; several theological essays; a life of his father, which is interesting from the account which it gives of his own early education; and Metaphysical Meditations, written to prove that, independently of all revelation and all positive law, there is that in the constitution of the human mind which renders man a law to himself.

See Boullée, Histoire de la vie et des ouvrages du chancelier d'Aguesseau (Paris, 1835); Fr. Monnier, Le Chancelier d'Aguesseau (Paris, 1860; 2nd ed., 1863); Charles Butler, Mem. of Life of H. F. d'Aguesseau, etc. (1830).
