= Louis-Gabriel de Gomer =

Count Louis-Gabriel de Gomer
- Louis-Gabriel, comte de Gomer
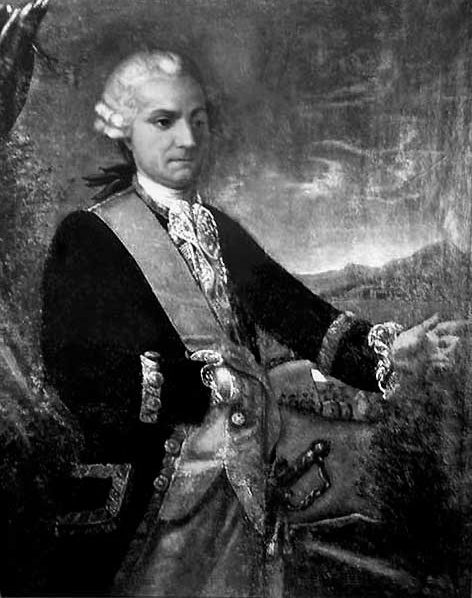
- Born: February 25, 1718; Quevauvillers, Kingdom of France
- Died: July 30, 1798 (aged 80); Dieuze, France
- Military career
- Allegiance: Kingdom of France
- Service years: 1730–1789
- Rank: Marechal de camp
- Awards: Commandeur de l'ordre de Saint-Louis

Louis-Gabriel de Gomer (February 25, 1718 – July 30, 1798) was a French military officer, and inventor of the Gomer mortar. He was a Marechal de camp and a Commander of the Order of Saint Louis in 1789, when he was elected as Deputy of the Estate General for Sarreguemines. He served as a member of the military committee until November 1789, when he resigned.
