= Élisabeth Le Bas =

French revolutionary and memoirist (1772–1859)

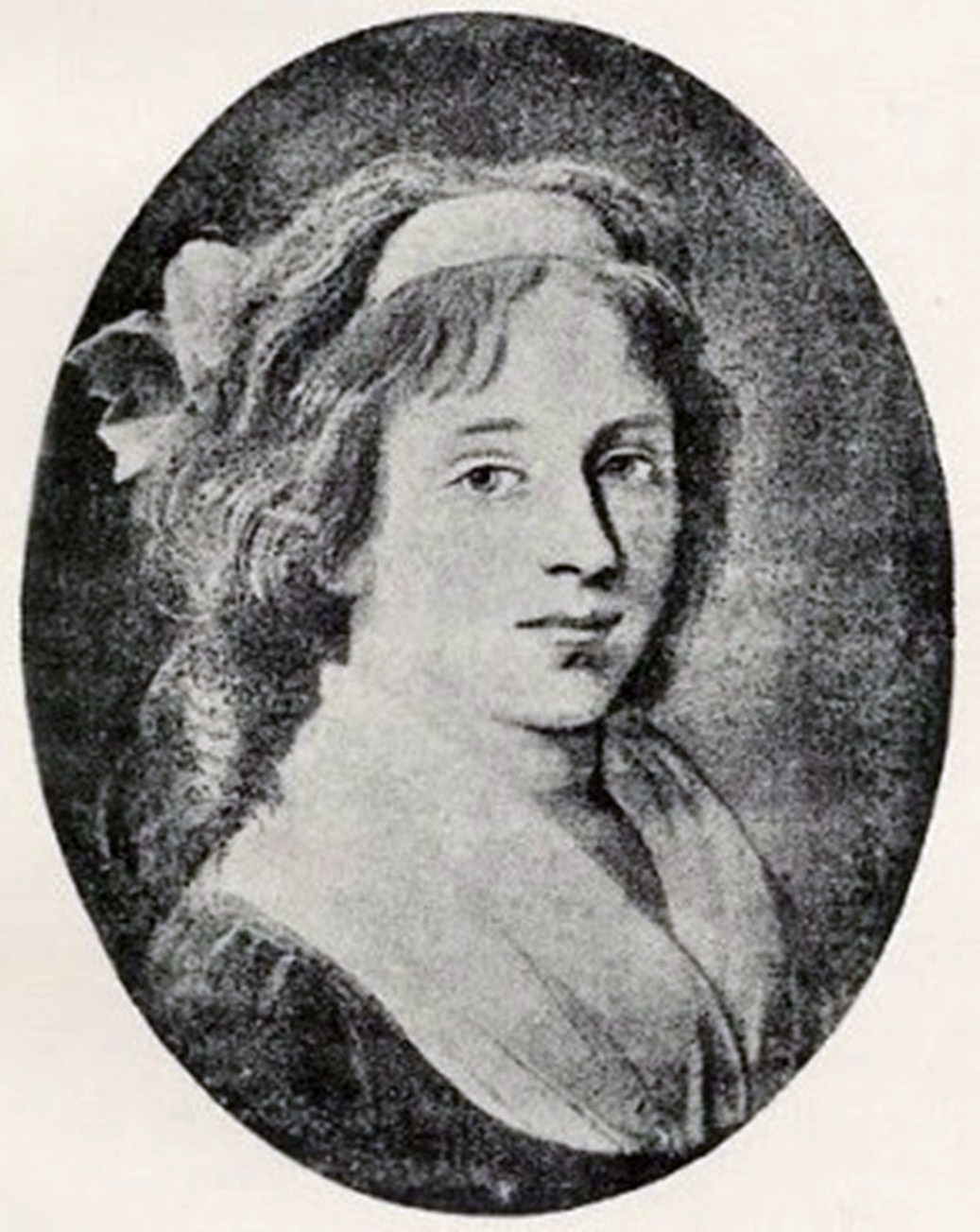
- Élisabeth Le Bas in 1794
- Born: Éléonore Élisabeth Duplay; 16 August 1772; Paris, Kingdom of France
- Died: 4 April 1859 (aged 86); Rouen, France
- Other name: Élisabeth Duplay
- Spouses: Philippe-François-Joseph Le Bas (m. 1793; died 1794) Charles-Louis-Joseph Le Bas (m. 1799; died 1829)
- Children: Philippe Le Bas; Charlotte Le Bas; Charles Le Bas
- Family: Maurice Duplay (father); Éléonore Duplay (sister)

Élisabeth Le Bas (Note: French pronunciation: [elizabɛt lə bɑ], sometimes written as "Lebas".) (née Éléonore Élisabeth Duplay; (Note: Although her birth name was "Éléonore Élisabeth Duplay", she was known as "Élisabeth Duplay" and one of her older sisters was known as "Éléonore Duplay".) 16 August 1772 – 4 April 1859) was a French revolutionary and memoirist who was close to Maximilien Robespierre. Her father was Robespierre's host, and her family considered him to be an adopted son. Le Bas was politically active and attended sessions at the National Convention and the Jacobin Club, and it was at one of these sessions that she met her future husband, Philippe-François-Joseph Le Bas. They were married with Robespierre's blessing, and together they had a son also named Philippe.

In July 1794, Le Bas's husband was swept up in the fall of Robespierre. When the Convention denounced Robespierre as a tyrant and called for his arrest, Philippe Le Bas demanded to be arrested as well. After her husband was briefly imprisoned, Le Bas met him at the Conciergerie prison, and she accompanied him to the Hôtel de Ville, where the Robespierrists would ultimately make their last stand. He urged her to return home, anticipating that he would be killed. When the forces of the Convention broke into the hotel in the early morning of 10 Thermidor (28 July), Philippe Le Bas committed suicide with a pistol.

In the aftermath of the fall of Robespierre, Le Bas and her family, including her infant son, were imprisoned. That first night, her mother committed suicide. Le Bas and her baby were imprisoned for 100 days before they were released after appealing to the mercy of the Committee of General Security. In the years after her regaining her freedom, she married her late husband's brother and had two more children. Le Bas wrote about her political activity and imprisonment in her memoirs, and she venerated her late husband Philippe Le Bas, Robespierre, and his deputies for the rest of her life.

== Early life ==
Élisabeth Le Bas was born as Éléonore Élisabeth Duplay on 16 August 1772 in the 11th arrondissement of Paris. Her father was Maurice Duplay, a carpenter, and her mother was Françoise-Éléonore Vaugeois. She was the youngest of five children.

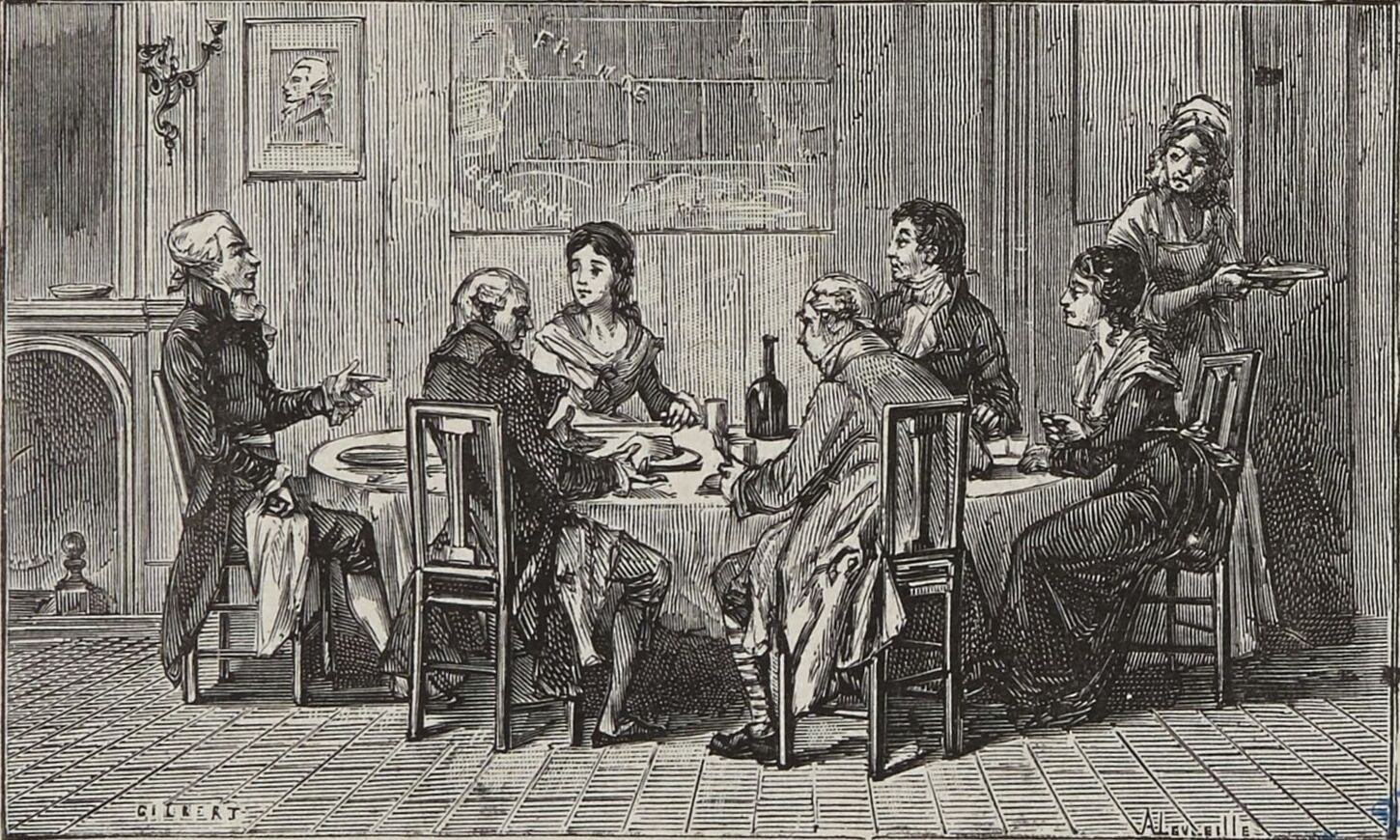
Robespierre (left) with the Duplay family

Her family hosted Maximilien Robespierre at their home at 366 rue Saint-Honoré (Note: The home is now numbered 398.) from 17 July 1791 until his death on 28 July 1794. The Duplay family considered Robespierre to be an adopted son. Robespierre would go on walks with the Duplay family in the Champs-Élysées, and then in the evenings he would read Corneille, Voltaire, and Rousseau to them. Le Bas wrote in her memoirs that her older sister Éléonore was promised to him.

== Political activity and marriage ==
Le Bas would sometimes go with her mother to the National Convention and the Jacobin Club to watch Robespierre speak. On 24 April 1793, when Jean-Paul Marat was acquitted by the Revolutionary Tribunal and triumphantly carried into the assembly, Le Bas was in attendance with Charlotte Robespierre. It was there at the assembly that she first met Philippe Le Bas, her future husband.

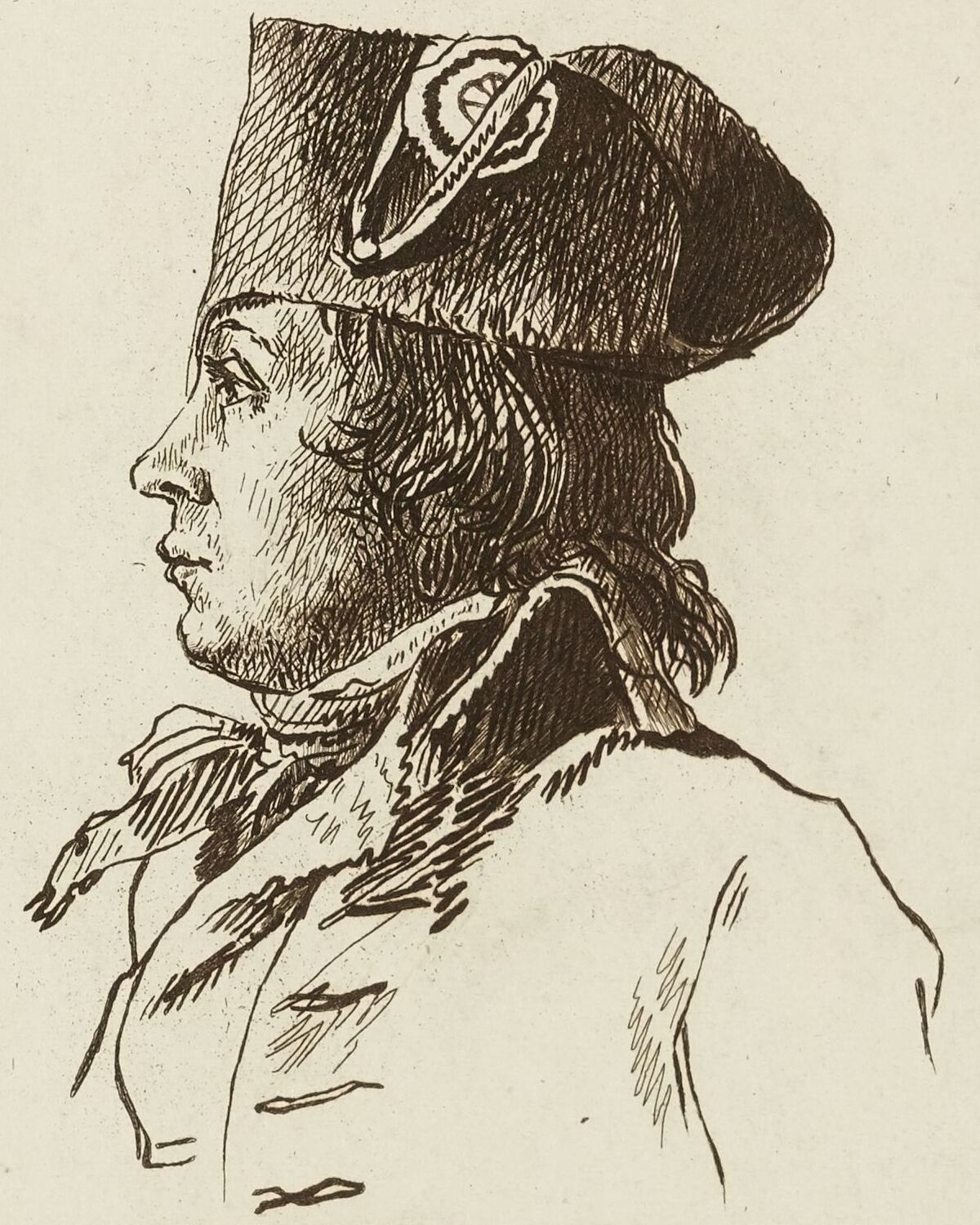
Élisabeth Le Bas's first husband, Philippe Le Bas, by Jacques Louis David

She continued to see Philippe Le Bas under supervision of a chaperone, and they exchanged gifts with one another. However, their courtship was interrupted when he suddenly fell ill and was unable to go to the Convention. Le Bas wrote in her memoirs that, during this time, a friend took her to meet the politician and orator Georges Danton at his country home in Sèvres. Le Bas found Danton repulsive and frightening, because she said he made "vile propositions" to her. She wrote: "He said ... I needed a good [boy] friend ... He approached, wanted to put his arm about my waist and kiss me. I pushed him away with force."

After two months apart, she was reunited with Philippe Le Bas by chance at the Jacobin Club when she was reserving seats to watch Robespierre speak. With her parents' and Robespierre's blessing, Philippe Le Bas proposed to her, but their marriage was delayed for several weeks when he was suddenly dispatched by the Committee of Public Safety to the Army of the North.

On 10 Fructidor, Year I (26 August 1793), she married Philippe Le Bas. Robespierre and the painter Jacques Louis David were among the witnesses, and Jacques René Hébert officiated the wedding ceremony. She was 21 years old at the time, and Philippe Le Bas was 29. On 29 Prairial, Year II (17 June 1794), they had a son also named Philippe.

== Fall of Robespierre ==
On 8 Thermidor, Year II (26 July 1794), Robespierre gave a controversial speech before the National Convention calling for the arrest of secret enemies of the Republic and defending himself against charges that he was seeking more power. He did not call for an end to the Terror, which led his political opponents to believe they needed to act fast. The next day on 9 Thermidor (27 July), Robespierre was denounced as a tyrant and shouted down when he tried to take the podium. The Convention called for his arrest, and "his friend Philippe Le Bas showed [his] devotion by demanding to be arrested with him."

By the authority of the Convention, Philippe Le Bas was arrested with Robespierre, Saint-Just, Couthon, and Augustin Robespierre. However, they were not detained long, because the prisons were staffed by Robespierre's supporters, who refused to incarcerate them. Élisabeth Le Bas met her husband when he was released from the Conciergerie prison and accompanied him to the Hôtel de Ville. When they arrived at the hotel, he urged her to go back home, because he anticipated that he would soon be killed.

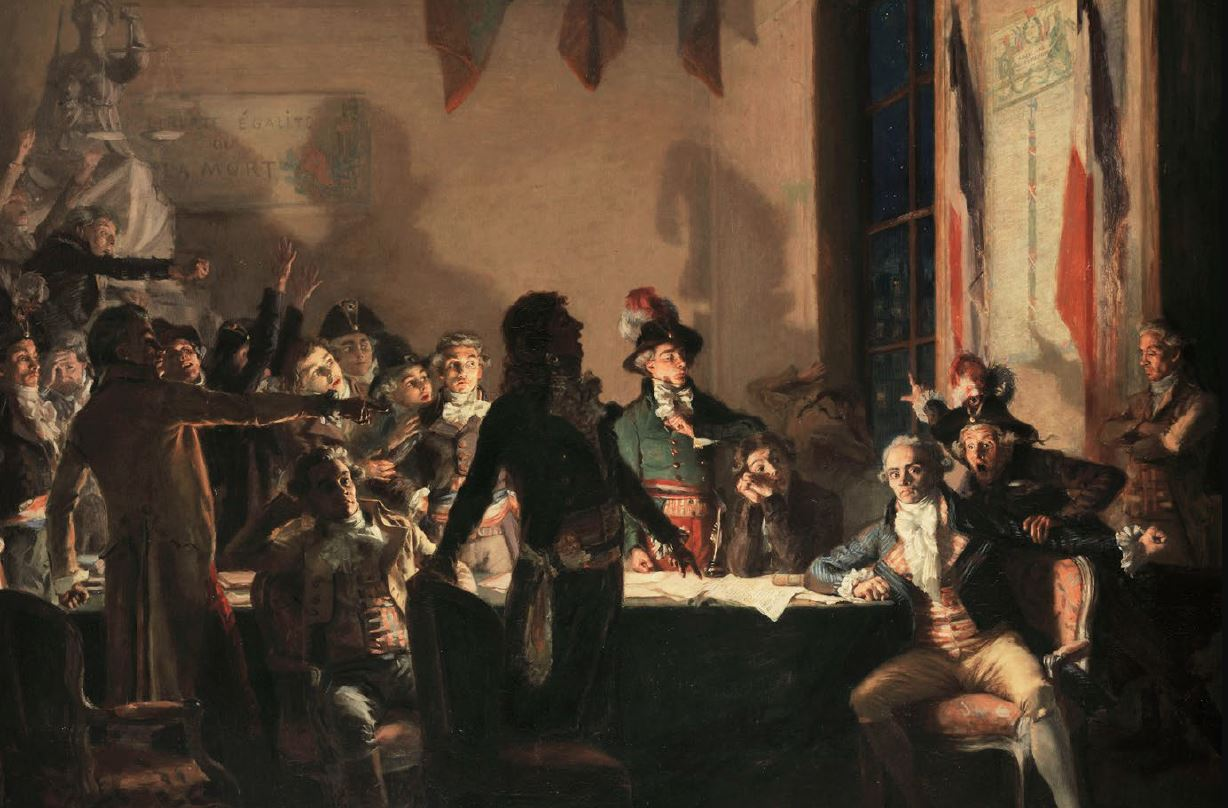
La Nuit du 9 au 10 thermidor (1897) by Jean-Joseph Weerts

Her husband joined Robespierre and other deputies inside the Hôtel de Ville to debate their next steps while guardsmen assembled at the Place de Grève nearby to defend them. When the forces of the Convention learned that Robespierre and his deputies were no longer under arrest, they went to the Hôtel de Ville to confront them. The guardsmen assembled at Place de Grève had already dispersed. In the early hours of 10 Thermidor (28 July), Robespierre was shot in the jaw, either by his own hand or by Charles-André Merda. As the anti-Robespierrists broke in, Philippe Le Bas grabbed a pistol and killed himself.

Later on 10 Thermidor, the survivors of the raid, including Robespierre, were tried by the Revolutionary Tribunal and sentenced to death. While Le Bas was overwhelmed with grief, not knowing what had become of her husband, her sister Éléonore watched from the window as a crowd transported Robespierre and his deputies to the guillotine, passing directly in front of the Duplay home. Shortly after, Le Bas and her family, including her 5-week-old son, were arrested.

== Imprisonment ==
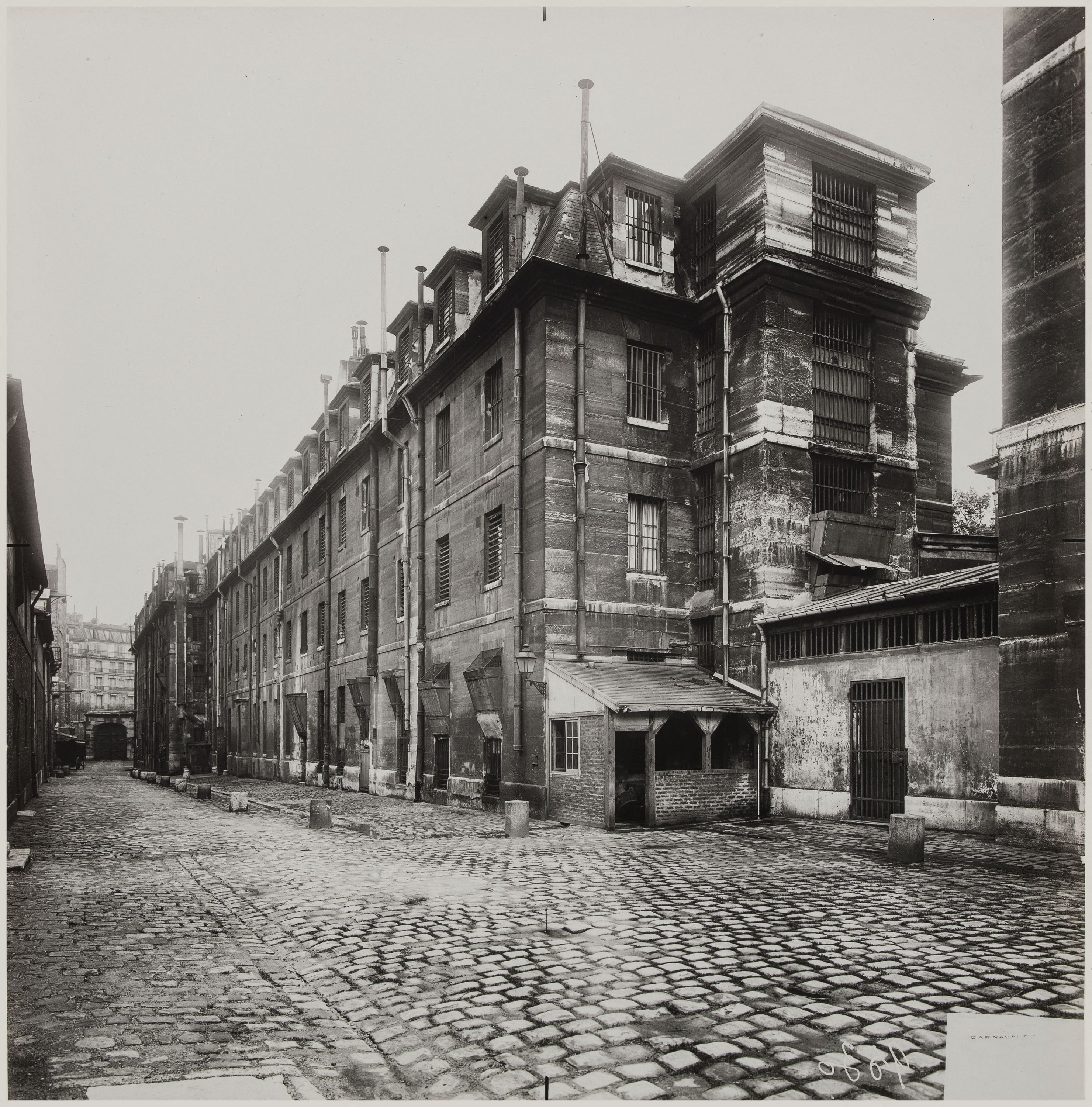
Saint-Lazare prison, where Élisabeth Le Bas was transferred with her infant son

The Duplay family was taken to Sainte-Pélagie prison. (Note: Élisabeth Le Bas wrote that she was transferred to several prisons, but the exact list and order is contradicted across several sources. For example, in her memoirs, Le Bas says that she was taken to "Talarue" prison first, whereas Émile Campardon notes that the Duplay family was first sent to Sainte-Pélagie.) The first night after their arrest, Le Bas's mother hanged herself in her cell. Throughout the length of her imprisonment, Le Bas and her infant son were transferred to several prisons, including La Petite Force, Talaru prison on rue de Richelieu, and Saint-Lazare.

In her memoirs, Le Bas described how difficult imprisonment was for her and her infant son. At "Talarue" prison, (Note: "Talarue" prison, also called Talaru, was a former hotel at 62 rue de Richelieu that was repurposed as a prison during the Terror. It was known as an establishment where wealthy prisoners could pay to stay in relative comfort. However, Le Bas's stay at Talaru was a "grim existance".) she said she was confined with her baby in a small cell above the prison's foul-smelling stables, where it was difficult to breathe. Caring for her baby while in prison was difficult; she had to wash his diapers in the courtyard at night and then dry them between the mattresses in her cell. Le Bas's sister-in-law Henriette voluntarily joined her in prison, but Henriette had to leave after "miserable types" tried to seduce her, offering to release Le Bas in exchange for sexual favors. After Henriette left, her sister Éléonore stepped in to provide support.

Le Bas wrote in her memoirs that she was grateful to her sister Éléonore for helping her survive the ordeal:

Oh! Je ne t'oublierai pas de ma vie! Car sans toi j'aurais succombé; mais par ton courage, tu as ranimé mes forces et tu m'a appris que j'avais une grande tâche à remplir que j'avais un fils, qu'il fallait vivre pour lui.
Oh! I will never forget you in my lifetime! For without you, I would have succumbed; but by your courage, you restored my strength and taught me that I had a great task to fulfill, that I had a son and had to live for him.

She also wrote that strangers visited her in prison and offered her freedom if she would marry another government deputy and abandon her husband's name. She refused their offers.

Les monstres croyaient m'intimider; je leur fis voir qu'ils n'y arriveraient pas ... j'aime la liberté ; le sang qui coule dans mes veines, à soixante-dix ans, est un sang de républicaine. Je n'ai jamais quitté le nom, si cher à mon cœur, que je me fais gloire de porter.
The monsters thought they could intimidate me; I showed them that they would not succeed ... I love liberty; the blood that flows through my veins, at seventy years old, is the blood of a republican. I will never abandon the name, so dear to my heart, that is a glory to bear.

== Freedom ==
Le Bas and her infant son's health deteriorated in prison, and she wrote to the Committee of General Security, asking for mercy. On Frimaire, Year III (8 November 1794), after 100 days in prison, her appeal was granted, and Le Bas and her son Philippe were released. Sometime after their release, Le Bas wrote that she was offered a government pension, but she refused to accept any assistance from her husband's "assassins". As historian Marilyn Yalom writes in Blood Sisters:

[S]he dramatically rejected all official assistance: "There, with a pin and a quill, I pierced my skin and wrote with my blood ... that if a claim had been made for what was due to my husband, I was not asking for help from his assassins. I signed: 'The Widow Le Bas.'"

On 20 Nivôse, Year VII (9 January 1799), she married her late husband's brother Charles Le Bas, an adjutant general and later a commissaire de police of Lorient, which allowed her to keep the "Le Bas" name. Together they had a daughter named Charlotte and a son also named Charles. Her husband Charles died in 1829.

In 1847, Alphonse de Lamartine met with Le Bas and her son Philippe Le Bas to write his book Histoire des Girondins. Lamartine wrote that Le Bas never renounced her friendship with Robespierre. In her memoirs, Le Bas wrote that she and her family loved Robespierre like a brother: "Pour nous, nous l'aimions comme un bon frère! Il était si bon!" (transl. "For us, we loved him like a brother! He was so good!"). Similarly, the poet Paul Valéry retold a story of a friend who once asked why Le Bas kept portraits of the "monsters" Robespierre, Saint-Just, and Couthon in her home, and she replied "Tais-toi ... c'étaient des saints" (transl. "Shut up ... they were saints."). She also remained "proud of the Le Bas name and its revolutionary reputation" for the rest of her life.

== Death and legacy ==
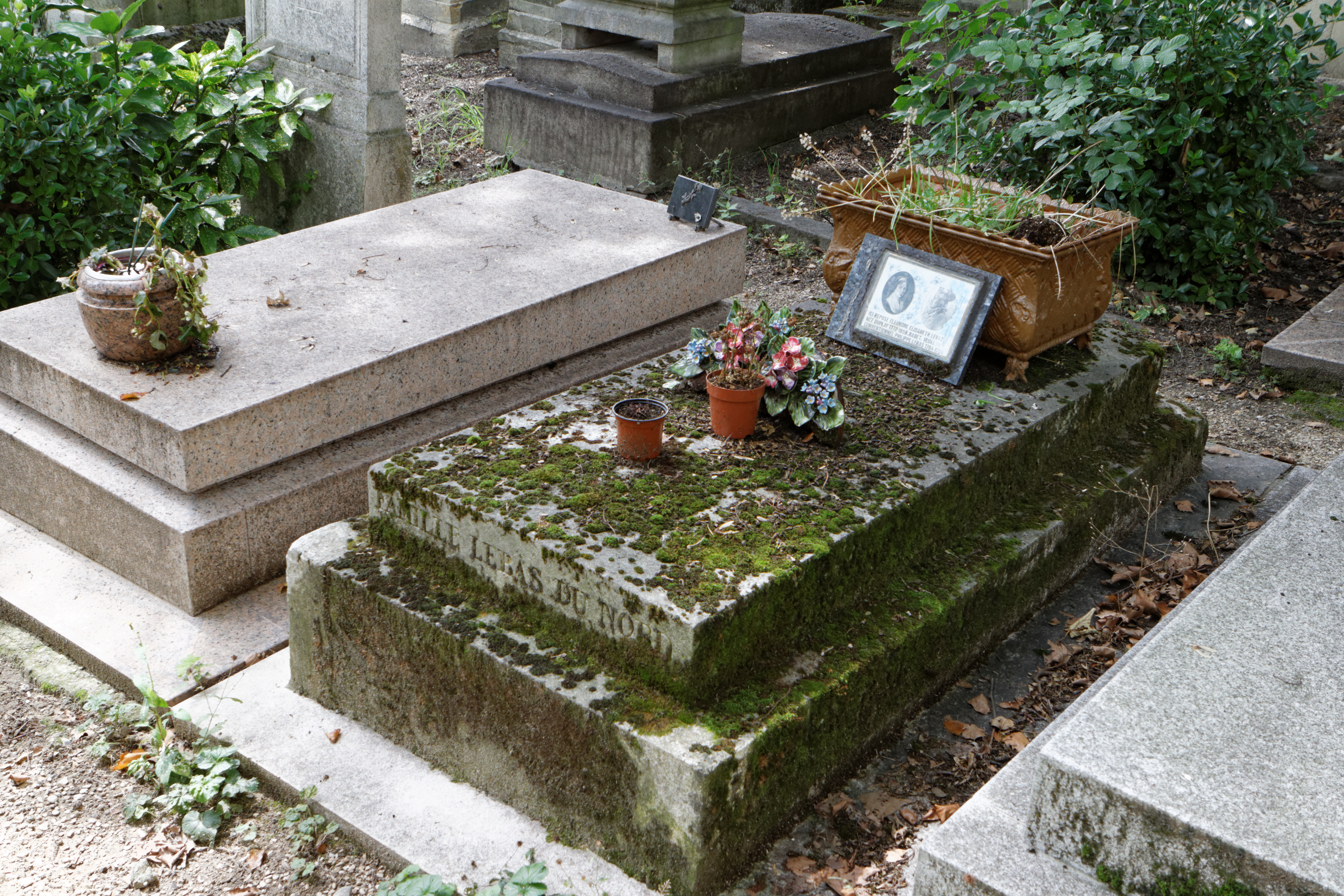
Élisabeth Le Bas's grave at Père-Lachaise cemetery

Élisabeth Le Bas died in Rouen on 4 April 1859 at the age of 86. She is buried at Père Lachaise Cemetery.

Her memoirs were published posthumously in a larger collection of letters about her first husband, Philippe Le Bas, called Le Conventionnel Le Bas.
