= Éléonore Duplay =

French revolutionary (1768–1832)

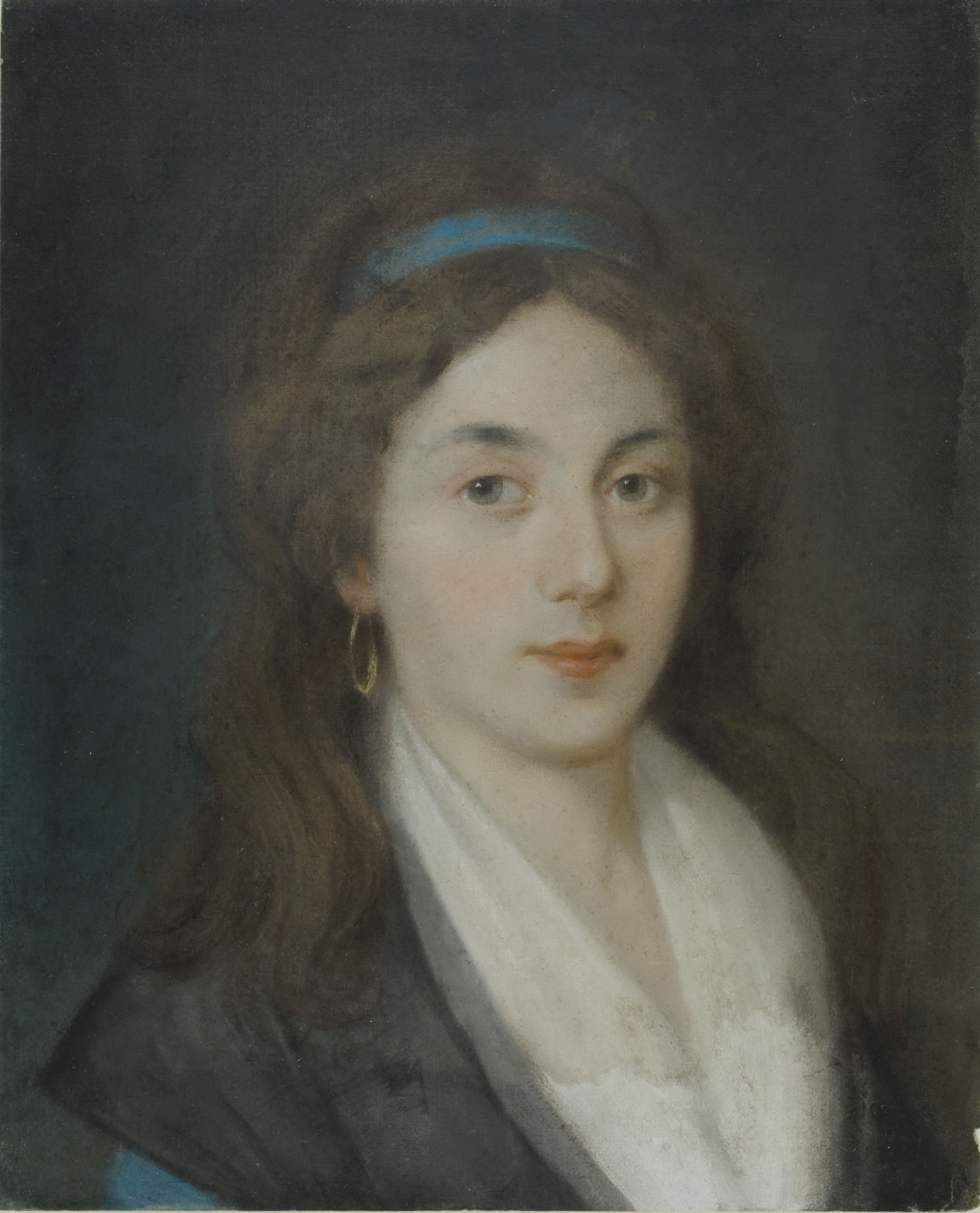
Pastel of Éléonore Duplay, attributed to Éléonore herself, from the Musée Carnavalet

Éléonore Duplay (1768, Paris – 26 July 1832, Paris), called Cornélie, after Cornelia Africana of Ancient Rome, was the daughter of Maurice Duplay, a master carpenter, and Françoise-Éléonore Vaugeois. She was the eldest of five children (four girls and a boy) and was born in 1768, two years after her parents' marriage, in Paris, where she would live all her life. During the Revolution, she studied painting under Jean-Baptiste Regnault.

== Relationship with Maximilien Robespierre ==
According to her sister, Élisabeth Le Bas, who married Philippe Le Bas of the Committee of General Security, she was "promised" to Maximilien Robespierre, whose political opinions she shared. He said of her, "âme virile, elle saurait mourir comme elle sait aimer" ("noble soul, she would know how to die as well as she knows how to love"). They often walked together in the Champs-Élysées or the woods of Versailles or Issy, although her siblings and parents were more often than not present for these walks as well. Many contemporaries and historians have suggested that she may have been his mistress, including Vilate, a juror on the Revolutionary Tribunal, who said, that Robespierre "lived maritally with the eldest daughter of his hosts", in reference to Éléonore. This, however, is contested by Robespierre's younger sister, Charlotte, who asserts that any notions of marriage or romance were purely on Éléonore's side and that Robespierre thought his younger brother ought to marry her rather than himself. Robespierre biographer, Peter McPhee, also supports a platonic view of the two, suggesting that if feelings were there, they were not acted upon. After his death she wore black for the rest of her life, never marrying, and was known as la Veuve Robespierre (the Widow Robespierre).

== Post Revolutionary Life ==
Though guilty of no crime, she was imprisoned with her sister Élisabeth and her six-week-old nephew, Philippe Le Bas fils after 9 Thermidor (27 July 1794). Élisabeth would later write in her memoir:

Oh! Je ne t'oublierai pas de ma vie! Car sans toi j'aurais succombé; mais par ton courage, tu as ranimé mes forces et tu m'a appris que j'avais une grande tâche à remplir que j'avais un fils, qu'il fallait vivre pour lui
Oh! I will not forget you in my lifetime! For without you I would have succumbed; but by your courage, you reanimated my force and taught me that I had a great task to fulfill in that I had a son and it was necessary to live for him

and elsewhere:

non, bonne chère soeur Éléonore, je n'oublierai de ma vie tout ton dévouement pour moi et pour ton pauvre petit neveu; ma reconnaissance sera éternelle!
no, good, dear sister Éléonore, I will not forget in my lifetime all your devotion for me and for your poor little nephew; my gratitude will be eternal!

They would not be released until 18 Frimaire Year III (8 December 1794).

Éléonore Duplay died on 26 July 1832, at the age of 64, and was buried in Père Lachaise Cemetery, where her grave may still be seen in the 34th division.
