= James O'Moran =

James or Jacques O'Moran (1 May 1735, Elphin – 6 March 1794, Paris) was an Irish général de division in French service.

== Life ==
The son of a shoemaker, O'Moran left Ireland at a young age for France, where he grew up in Morin-la-Montagne before joining up as a cadet on 15 November 1752 in the Irish brigade de Dillon. His services were so valued that he rose to lieutenant-en-second on 14 January 1759. He served in Germany in the campaigns of 1760-61 and rose to sous-lieutenant on 1 March 1763, sous-aide-major on 4 February 1769, captain on 16 April 1771, capitaine-en-second on 5 June 1776, capitaine-commandant on 30 January 1778, major on 20 October 1779, mestre-de-camp on 24 June 1780, lieutenant-colonel to Dillon on 9 June 1785 and colonel of the regiment on 25 August 1791. He fought in the American Revolutionary War, commanding in the trenches, being wounded at the siege of Savannah in September 1779 and joining the Society of the Cincinnati. From 1779 to 1782 he was in Grenada, then in America in 1783. On the French Revolution he was promoted to colonel on 25 July 1791, maréchal de camp on 6 February 1792, lieutenant général then général de division. Serving under Dumouriez in Champagne and Belgium, capturing Tournai.

On 3 October 1792 he rose to lieutenant général and in 1793 received command of the camp at Cassel, where he found the armée du Nord defending Flanders against the British and Prussians. Arriving at his post in April, O'Moran toured the strongholds placed under him (Cassel, Bergues, Dunkirk and Bailleul) to put them into a state of readiness and defence. At the end of 1793 he was the commander of the camp at Lille then commander-in-chief of the troops from Douai at Dunkirk. On representations from the Ferrières division and suspected of having received English bribes, he was suspended, arrested and imprisoned (as was Richardot) by delegates Le Bas and Duquesnoy in August 1793. He was brought before the Revolutionary Tribunal in Paris under the Reign of Terror and it condemned him to the guillotine for treason "in opposing plans at the moment of their execution". He was guillotined in Place du Trône renversé on 6 March 1794.

== Sources ==
- Lee, Sidney, ed. (1895). "O'Moran, James" . Dictionary of National Biography. Vol. 42. London: Smith, Elder & Co. p. 174.
