= Philippe Le Bas =

French archaeologist

Philippe Le Bas (18 June 1794 in Paris – 19 May 1860 in Paris) was a French hellenist, archaeologist and translator. He was the only son of Philippe Le Bas and Élisabeth Duplay, the daughter of Robespierre's landlord Maurice Duplay. He was only 6 weeks old when his father committed suicide on Robespierre's fall on 27 July 1794 in the Thermidorian Reaction. Later, he served as a tutor to Louis Napoleon, the future Emperor Napoleon III. Le Bas died on 16 May 1860 at his home in the Quartier de la Sorbonne, and was buried in the Père Lachaise Cemetery.

== Works ==
- "Voyage en Asie-Mineure", Revue de philologie, de littérature et d'histoire anciennes 1 (1845): 27–46, 201–228, 323–354
- Asie Mineure depuis les temps les plus anciens jusqu'à la bataille d'Ancyre, en 1402, ed. Paul Chéron, Paris: Firmin Didot, 1863 (lower-quality copy with maps)
- Voyage archéologique en Grèce et en Asie Mineure (1842-1844): planches de topographie, de sculpture et d'architecture, ed. Salomon Reinach, Paris: Firmin Didot, 1888
