= Augustin Robespierre =

French lawyer and revolutionary (1763–1794)

Augustin de Robespierre
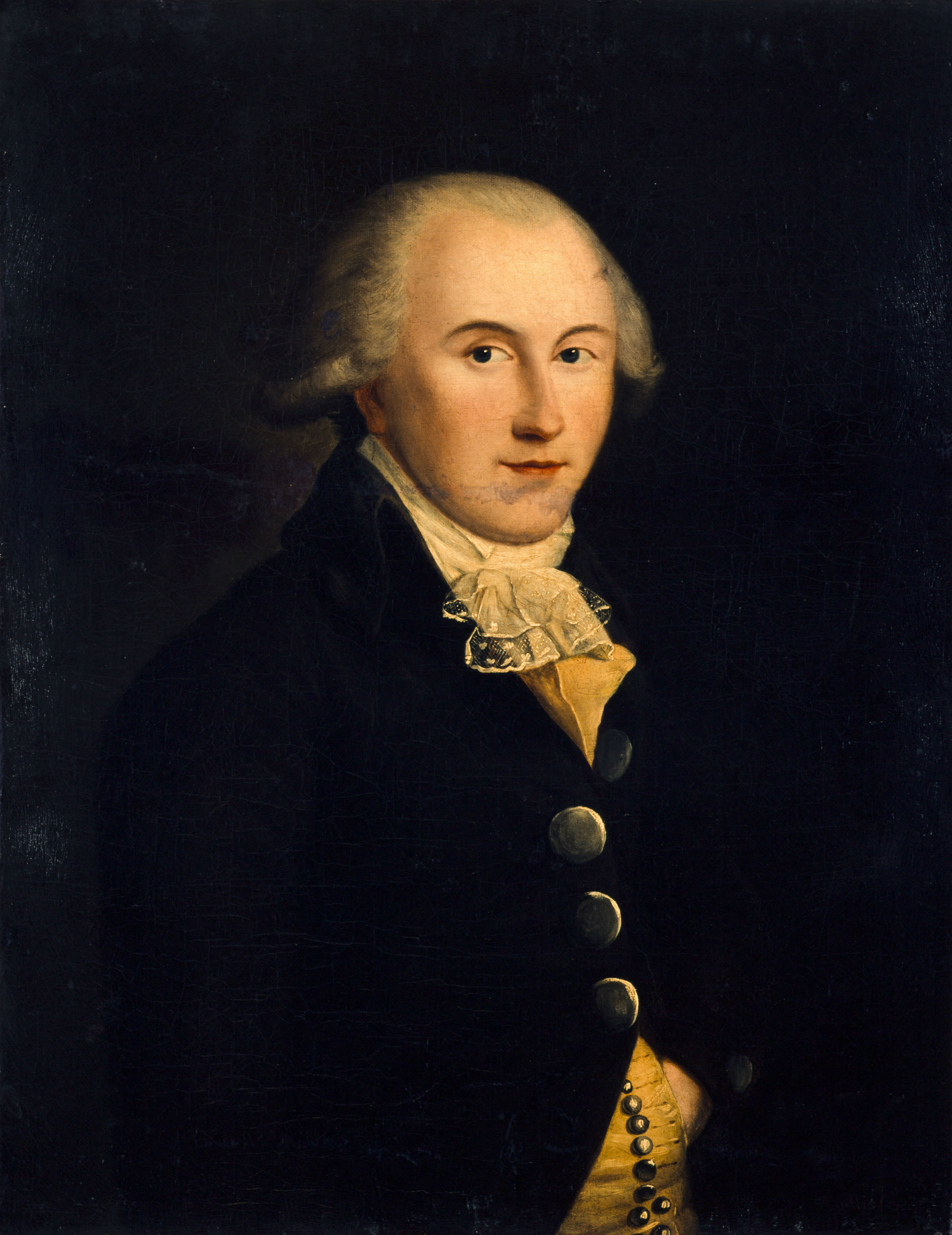
- Presumed portrait of Robespierre, c. 1790 (Musée Carnavalet)

Member of the National Convention for Paris
- In office 20 September 1792 – 28 July 1794

Personal details
- Born: Augustin Bon Joseph de Robespierre; 21 January 1763 Arras, Artois, France
- Died: 28 July 1794 (aged 31) Place de la Révolution, Paris, France
- Cause of death: Execution by guillotine
- Party: The Mountain

Augustin Bon Joseph de Robespierre (French: [ogystɛ̃ d(ə) ʁɔbɛspjɛʁ]; 21 January 1763 – 28 July 1794), known as Robespierre the Younger (Robespierre le Jeune), was a French lawyer and politician, the younger brother of revolutionary leader Maximilien Robespierre. His political views were similar to his brother's. When his brother was arrested on 9 Thermidor, Robespierre volunteered to be arrested as well, and he was executed by the guillotine along with Maximilien and 20 of his supporters.

== Early life ==
Robespierre was born in Arras, the youngest of four children of the lawyer Maximilien-Barthelemy-François de Robespierre and Jacqueline-Marguerite Carrault, the daughter of a brewer. His mother died when he was one year old, and his grief-stricken father abandoned the family to go to Bavaria, where he died in 1777. Augustin was brought up by his grandparents. His brother Maximilien had won a scholarship from the Abbey of St. Vaast to pay for his studies at the Lycée Louis-le-Grand and had been such an outstanding student that when he obtained his degree in law, he asked the Abbot, Cardinal de Rohan, if he would transfer the scholarship to his younger brother to allow him to follow the same career. The Cardinal agreed and Augustin Robespierre took up his brother's place studying law.

Although his political views were very similar to those of his brother, Robespierre was very different in character. Handsome, he was also fond of good food, gaming and the company of women, and called "Bonbon". At the outset of the Revolution, Robespierre was prosecutor-syndic of Arras. Together with Martial Herman he founded a political club in the town and wrote to his brother to secure its affiliation with the Jacobins in Paris. In 1791, he was appointed administrator of the département of Pas-de-Calais.

== Convention ==
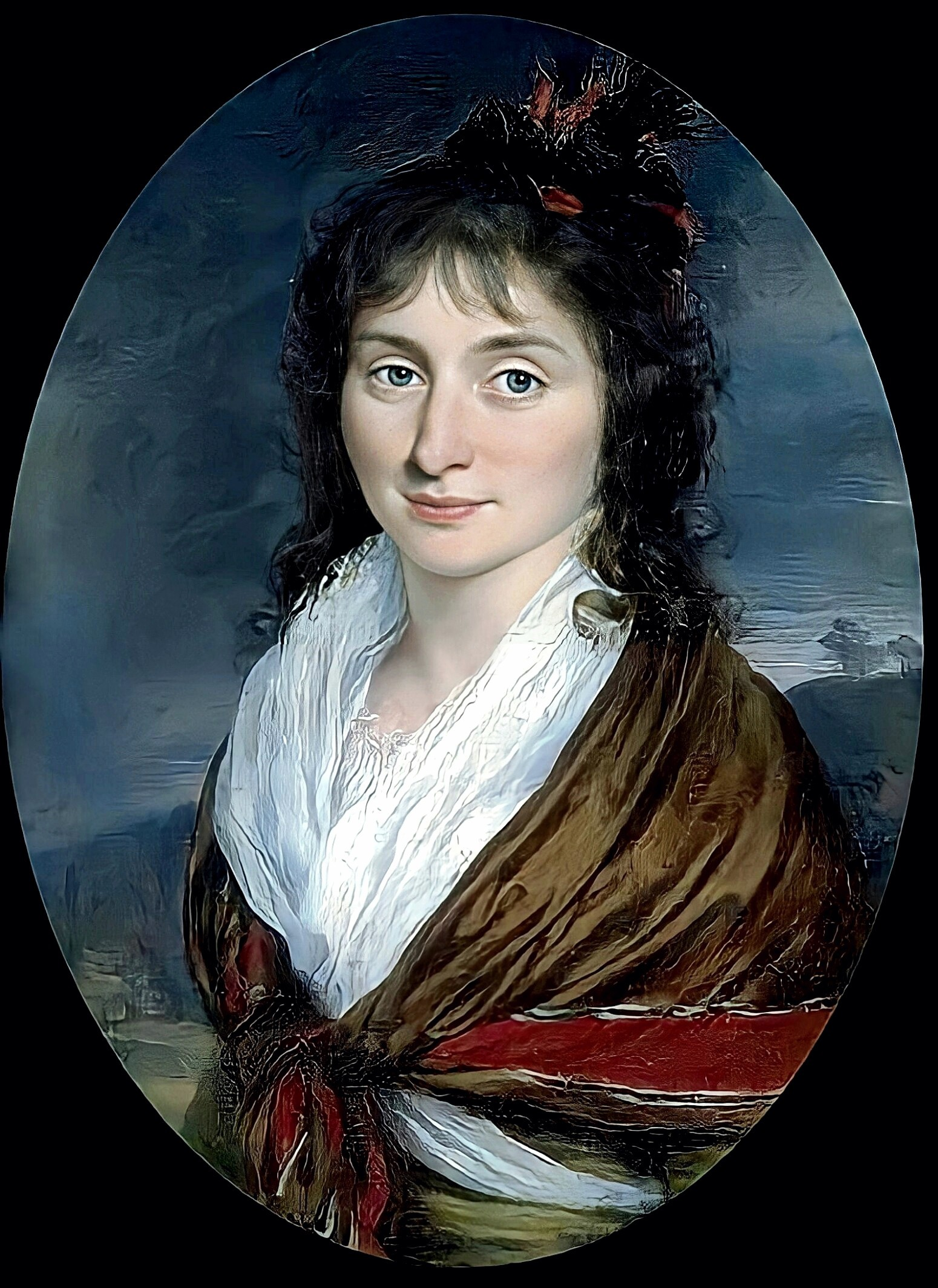
Charlotte Robespierre

Robespierre stood for election to the new Legislative Assembly in Arras in August 1791, but his views were too radical for the town, which elected another young lawyer, Sixte François Deusy instead. However, on 16 September 1792, Robespierre was elected to the National Convention, 19th out of 24 deputies, with 392 votes out of 700 cast, by the voters of Paris, and he joined his brother in The Mountain and the Jacobin Club. At the Convention he distinguished himself by the vehemence of his attacks on the royal family and on aristocrats. During the trial of Louis XVI he voted for the death penalty to be applied within 24 hours.

When he first came to Paris to take his seat he was accompanied by his sister Charlotte, and they both lodged with Maximilien in the house of Maurice Duplay in the Rue Saint Honoré. Like his brother Maximilien, Augustin refused to marry Duplay's daughter Éléonore. Soon, Charlotte persuaded Maximilien to come with them to a new lodging in the nearby Rue Saint-Florentin because of his increased prestige and her tensions with Madame Duplay. However, this arrangement did not last long.

At the end of July 1793, Robespierre was sent on a mission to Alpes-Maritimes to suppress the Federalist revolt, together with another deputy from the convention, Jean François Ricord. Charlotte accompanied him. Much of southeastern France (Midi) was in rebellion against the Republic, and they barely made it alive after an attack by counter-revolutionaries in Manosque on August 12, 1793. In September 1793, they arrived in Nice where they felt secure enough to attend the theatre, but on the third occasion they did so, they were pelted with rotten apples. Meanwhile Robespierre discovered a pamphlet entitled Le souper de Beaucaire (The supper at Beaucaire), written by Napoleon, and was impressed by the revolutionary context. Napoleon was promoted into the position of senior gunner at Toulon. On 17 December Augustin stayed in Ollioules. On 19 December 1793 Augustin did not take part in the military action, led by Dugommier and Napoleon, which retook Toulon from the British. He seems to have left a few hours before or the day after and was not present when Fréron took revenge on the population. When he returned to Paris, Augustin decided not to move in with Charlotte; they were no longer on speaking terms. In early January Augustin Robespierre was shocked at the changed atmosphere in the Jacobin club. By now the revolutionaries feared one another. Augustin went to live with Ricord and his wife. Maximilien returned to the Duplays' house in February 1794, being sick.

At the end of January Robespierre was dispatched once again as a representant en mission, now to the Army of Italy in Haute-Saône. This time he took with him his mistress, La Saudraye, the creole wife of a literary man. She accompanied him to the local Popular Society in Besançon, where members reacted indignantly to the active role she took in debates, and to the fact that Robespierre listened to and thought highly of her opinions on politics. He also used his influence while with the Army of Italy to advance Napoleon's career. On his return to Paris he served as a secretary to the convention.

== Death ==
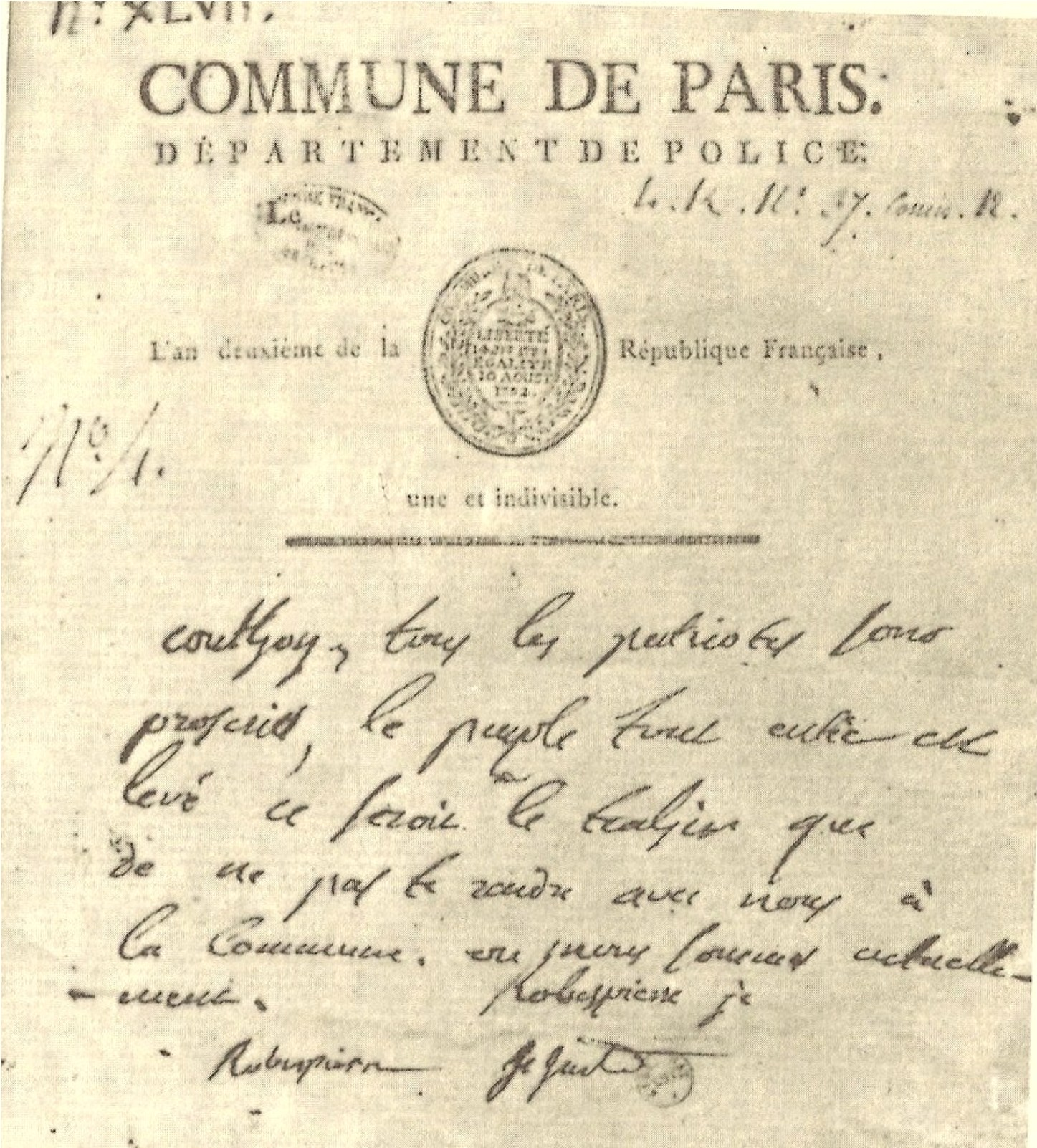
Proclamation written by Augustin and signed by him, Maximilien Robespierre and Saint-Just calling Couthon to come to the townhall in the late evening of 9 Thermidor

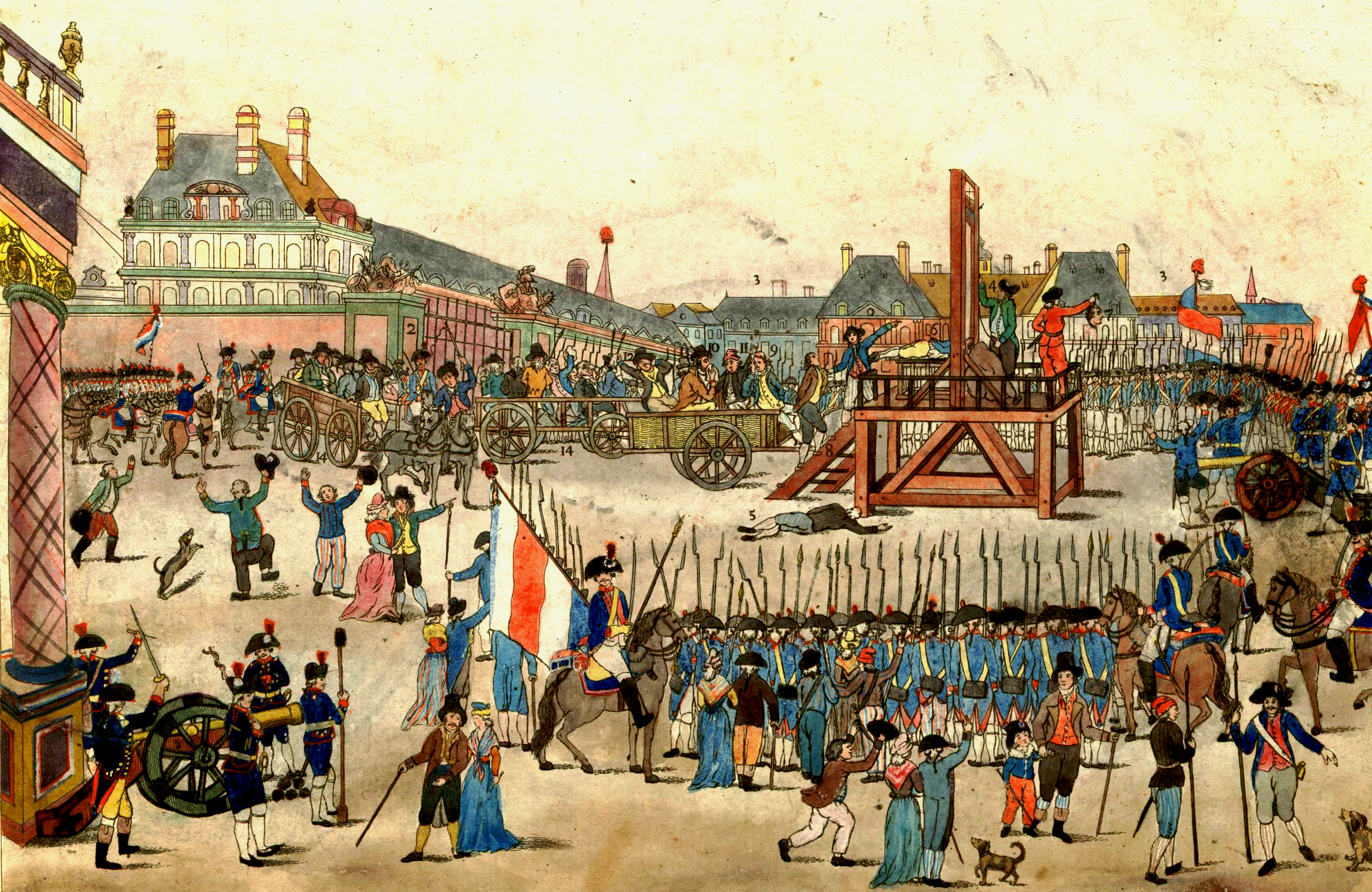
Augustin Robespierre led up the steps to the guillotine on 28 July 1794

Robespierre was in the hall of the Convention on the day of 9 Thermidor II (27 July 1794), when the deputies voted for the arrests of Maximilien, Louis Antoine de Saint-Just and Georges Couthon after a heated discussion. Robespierre then rose from his place on the benches and said, "I am as guilty as him; I share his virtues, I want to share his fate. I ask also to be charged." He was joined by Philippe-François-Joseph Le Bas. The five were kept under guard in the rooms of the Committee of General Security, where they remained until a place could be found for them. Hearing of the arrests, the Commune of Paris issued orders to all prisons in the city, forbidding them to take any prisoner in, sent by the Convention. Robespierre was refused at Prison Saint-Lazare and taken to the prison of La Force while Maximilien was taken to the Luxembourg. Because of the Commune's orders, they were released and made their way to the Hôtel de Ville. Escorted by two municipal officers, Robespierre was the first to arrive. There they spent the rest of the evening vainly trying to coordinate an insurrection. In the early morning of 10 Thermidor, the forces of the Convention under Paul Barras burst in and succeeded in taking most of them alive, except Le Bas, who had shot himself, and Jean-Baptiste Coffinhal, who succeeded in escaping but turned himself in after a week.

In order to avoid capture, Robespierre took off his shoes and jumped from a ledge. He landed on the steps, or on some bayonets, resulting in a pelvic fracture and several serious head contusions. Barras ordered that Robespierre be carried back to the rooms of the Committee of General Security. After a couple of hours the prisoners were taken to the Conciergerie prison; four of them were lying on stretchers. After identification at the Revolutionary Tribunal according to the Law of 22 Prairial, the twenty-two convicts were sent to the scaffold on Place de la Révolution in the early evening. Couthon was the second of the prisoners to be executed, with Robespierre as the third, Hanriot as the ninth and Maximilien as the tenth.
