= Philippe-François-Joseph Le Bas =

French revolutionary (1764–1794)

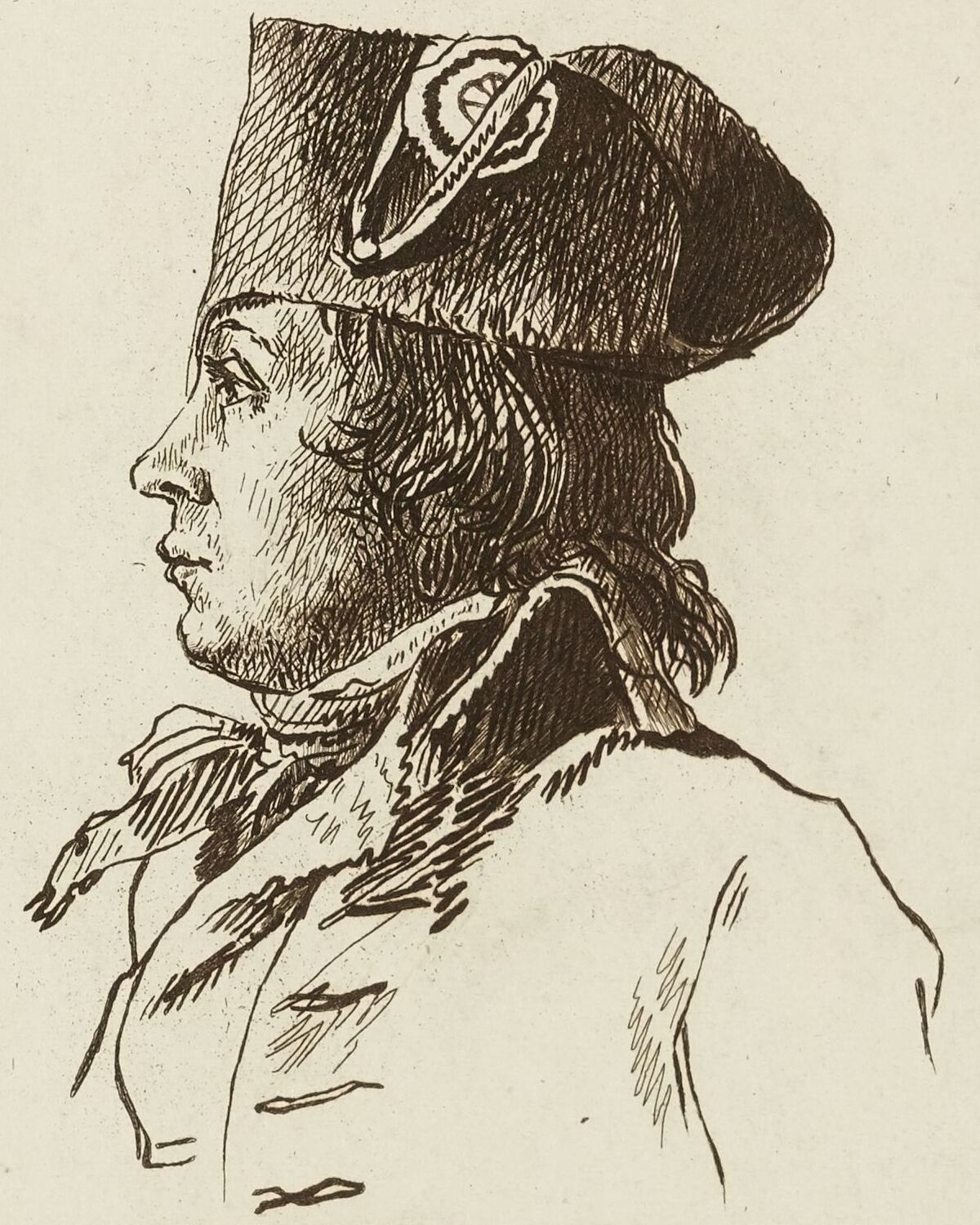

Member of the Committee of General Security
- In office 14 September 1793 – 28 July 1794

Member of the National Convention
- In office 6 September 1792 – 28 July 1794
- Constituency: Pas-de-Calais

Personal details
- Born: 4 November 1764 Frévent, Pas-de-Calais, Kingdom of France
- Died: 28 July 1794 (aged 29) Hôtel de Ville, Paris, First French Republic
- Cause of death: Suicide
- Party: The Mountain
- Spouse: Élisabeth Le Bas (m. 1793)
- Children: Philippe Le Bas
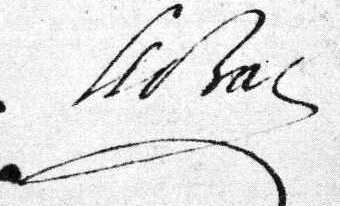
- Signature

Philippe-François-Joseph Le Bas (4 November 1764 – 28 July 1794) was a French politician and revolutionary who was close to Maximilien Robespierre and Louis Antoine de Saint-Just. As a member of the National Convention during the French Revolution, he aligned with the Montagnards and voted to convict and execute the former king, Louis XVI, for high treason. He was elected to the powerful Committee of General Security during the Reign of Terror and saw it use the Law of Suspects to prosecute enemies of the Republic. Le Bas also served as a représentant en mission—a civilian deputy endowed with extraordinary powers—to reorganize the armies of the North and the Rhine during the French Revolutionary Wars. After distinguishing himself in his missions, he was appointed to lead the newly-formed École de Mars, a military school for teenage boys. In 1793, he married Élisabeth Duplay, and, the following year, they had a son also named Philippe.

Le Bas's loyalty to Robespierre led to his downfall and death after the coup of 9 Thermidor. When Robespierre was denounced as a tyrant and threatened with arrest on 27 July 1794, Le Bas demanded to be arrested alongside him. He was briefly detained by the authority of the Convention but released by his jailers on the same day. Le Bas then joined Robespierre and other deputies in the Hôtel de Ville in Paris to plan their next steps. As the forces of the Convention broke in to arrest them all, Le Bas committed suicide with a pistol. He was 29 years old. His wife and infant son were subsequently arrested and imprisoned for 100 days.

== Early life ==
Le Bas was born on 4 November 1764 to a poor family in the Frévent commune in the Pas-de-Calais. (Note: Before the administrative reorganization of France during the French Revolution, the Pas-de-Calais was known as Artois.) His father was Ange-François Le Bas, an intendant for the estate of the Prince of Rache and later postmaster of Frévent, and his mother was Augustine Antoinette Guislaine Hemery. Le Bas attended the Collège de Montaigu in Paris and then worked as a clerk in order to support his family, which included 13 children at the time. After earning his law degree in April 1789, Le Bas was admitted to the Parlement of Paris as an attorney. He was described by someone who knew him as "grave in demeanor, with blue eyes and blond hair".

== Political career ==
On 6 September 1792, Le Bas became a deputy to the National Convention for the department of the Pas-de-Calais in Saint-Pol. Although Le Bas initially identified with the Girondins, he ultimately aligned with the Montagnards. He became a close friend of Louis Antoine de Saint-Just, whom he "worshiped ... as a paragon, almost a saint." Maximilien Robespierre also counted him as a friend; in his notes, he wrote Le Bas's name at the top of two lists of "hommes sûrs ayant de la tête et du cœur", or "reliable men of intelligence and heart".

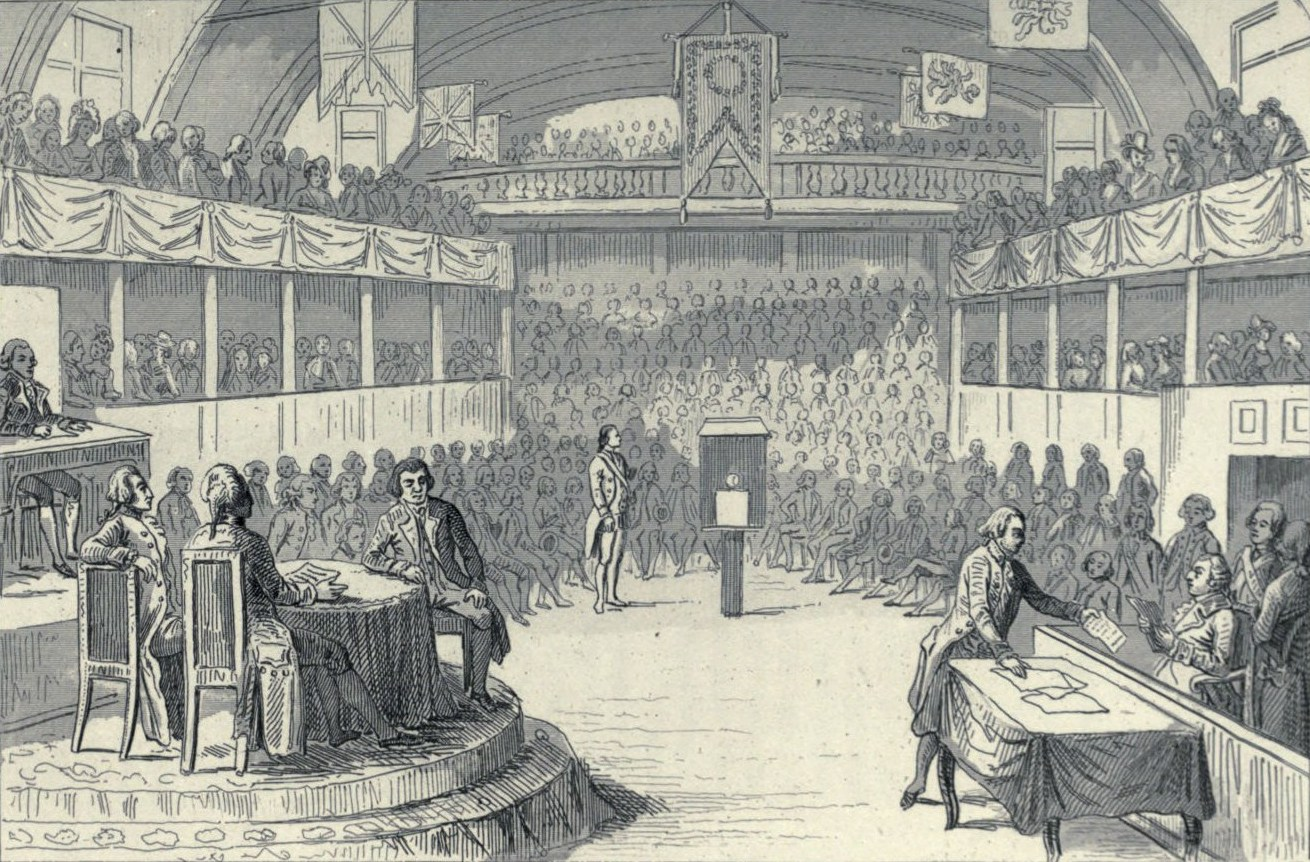
Citizen Louis Capet (formerly King Louis XVI) being cross-examined at his trial at the National Convention.

During the trial of Louis XVI at the National Convention from December 1792 to January 1793, Le Bas voted to convict the former king—then referred to simply as Citizen Louis Capet—of high treason, along with an overwhelming majority of 683 members. He then voted for the death penalty and against a stay of execution. He corresponded with his father throughout the proceedings; on 20 January, the day before Capet was guillotined, Le Bas wrote to his father: "demain un grand acte de justice nationale s'accomplira" (transl. tomorrow a great act of national justice will be accomplished).

On 14 September 1793, Le Bas was elected to the Committee of General Security. A few days later on 17 September, the Law of Suspects passed, which gave the Committee broad powers to prosecute suspected enemies of the Republic, including émigrés and "those who, by their conduct, relations or language spoken or written, [had] shown themselves partisans of tyranny or federalism and enemies of liberty". Historians consider September 1793 to be the beginning of the Reign of Terror period of the Revolution, with historian Albert Soboul calling the Committee of General Security the "Ministry of the Terror". While serving on the Committee, Le Bas was one of the deputies who signed the arrest warrant for fellow deputy Georges Danton on 30 March 1794, alleging corruption and royalist sympathies and leading to Danton's execution by guillotine on 5 April.

=== Army of the North ===
On 2 August 1793, Le Bas and Duquesnoy, a fellow deputy from the Pas-de-Calais, were sent by the Committee of Public Safety to organize the Army of the North. Le Bas and Duquesnoy concluded that the rampant disorder in the army was due to officers' negligence, and they ordered the arrests of the generals Jérôme-Étienne-Marie Richardot and James O'Moran for inability. (Note: Richardot died in prison, and O'Moran was guillotined.)

Le Bas's assignment to the Army of the North came almost immediately after he had proposed to his future wife, Élisabeth Duplay. They had to delay their wedding. In her memoirs, Duplay said that Le Bas sent her letters from the garrison, and they each wrote about how unbearable the separation was. Her memoirs describe how Le Bas believed he "would fall sick" if he could not return and get married soon. After a few weeks away, he returned to Paris for their wedding on 26 August 1793.

=== Army in the Rhine ===
After continued setbacks during the French Revolutionary Wars in 1793, Le Bas and Saint-Just were sent to Alsace and given "supreme civilian power" to reorganize the Army in the Rhine. Although Saint-Just "completely overshadowed" Le Bas during their joint mission, they were both in total agreement. When the two deputies arrived in Alsace on 22 October, they witnessed a demoralized and beaten army. To lift the soldiers' spirits, Saint-Just and Le Bas cosigned a proclamation that merit would be rewarded. They also asked for all soldiers of every rank to submit their grievances so that they could "avenge" crimes committed. It quickly became apparent to the deputies that the army's officers were to blame for morale and discipline issues in the ranks. The officers were lax and spent their nights in the city of Strasbourg, leaving their men to wander the nearby countryside.

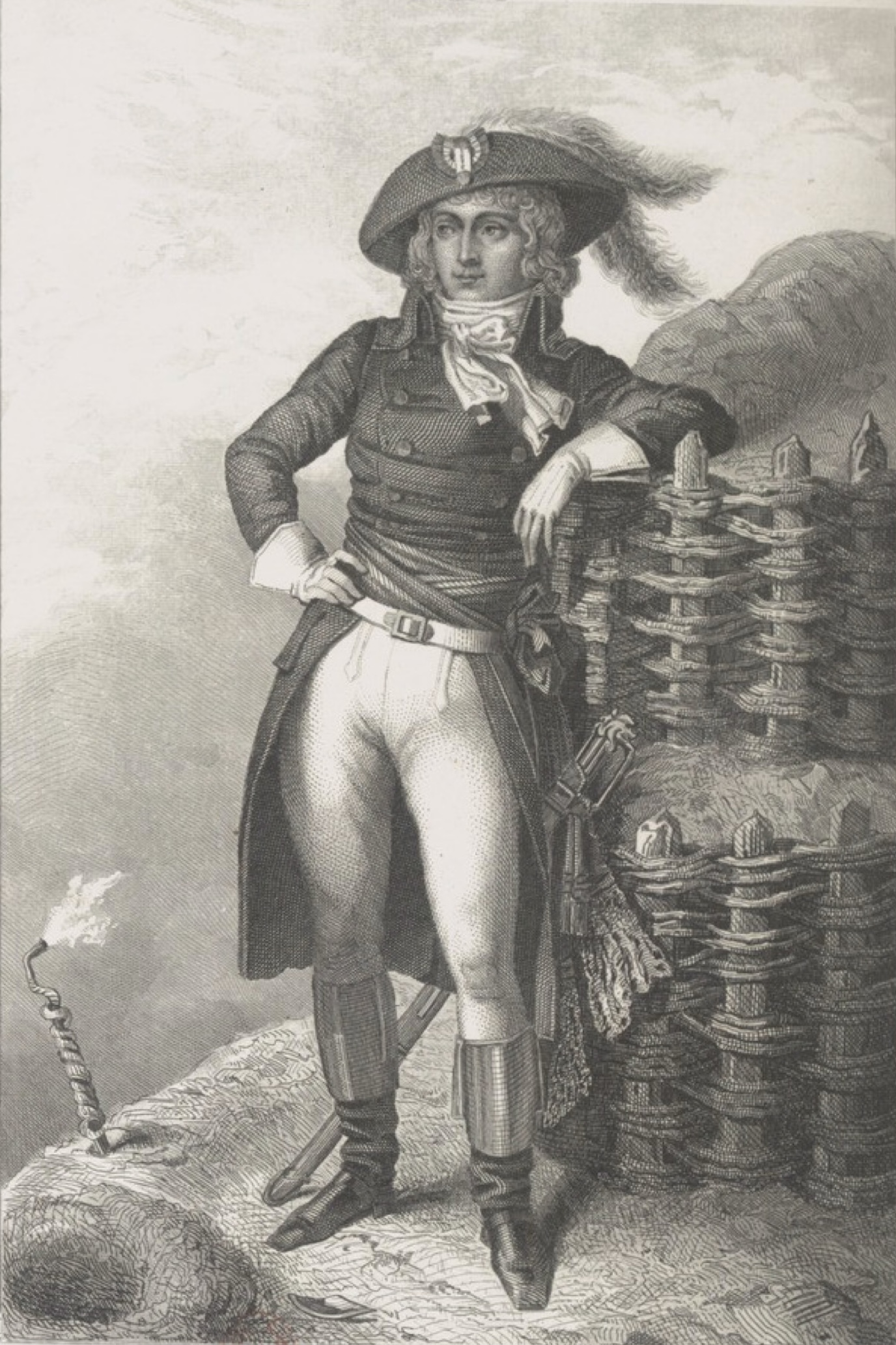
Engraving of Saint-Just (published in 1849)

Saint-Just proceeded to purge the officers for being traitors or former aristocrats; a number of officers, including General Augustin Joseph Isambert, were convicted in a military court and shot in front of the soldiers. Rules were established to restore discipline, and General Jean-Charles Pichegru was "repeatedly ordered to drill his men". The deputies also set out to equip the soldiers by ordering the rich in Strasbourg to provide 2,000 beds and 10,000 shoes; ultimately, "every overcoat in the city was also requisitioned" for the cause. Revolutionary courts with expanded authority were created to ensure that Saint-Just and Le Bas's decrees were followed.

The deputies also extended their mandate beyond matters of defense and security in Alsace. On 31 October, Saint-Just and Le Bas passed a new tax on the rich in Strasbourg, collecting a total of 9 million livres. To redistribute wealth, a portion of the tax (2 million livres) was earmarked to feed and clothe the poor. The law of the General Maximum, which limited the maximum price of goods and punished price gouging, was also strictly enforced. The following month, Robespierre celebrated their actions in a speech at the Jacobin Club, saying they had "aroused once more the forces of revolutionary strength and patriotic fervour" and adding that "the aristocrats had been guillotined". Le Bas and Saint-Just left Alsace on 16 November.

=== École de Mars ===
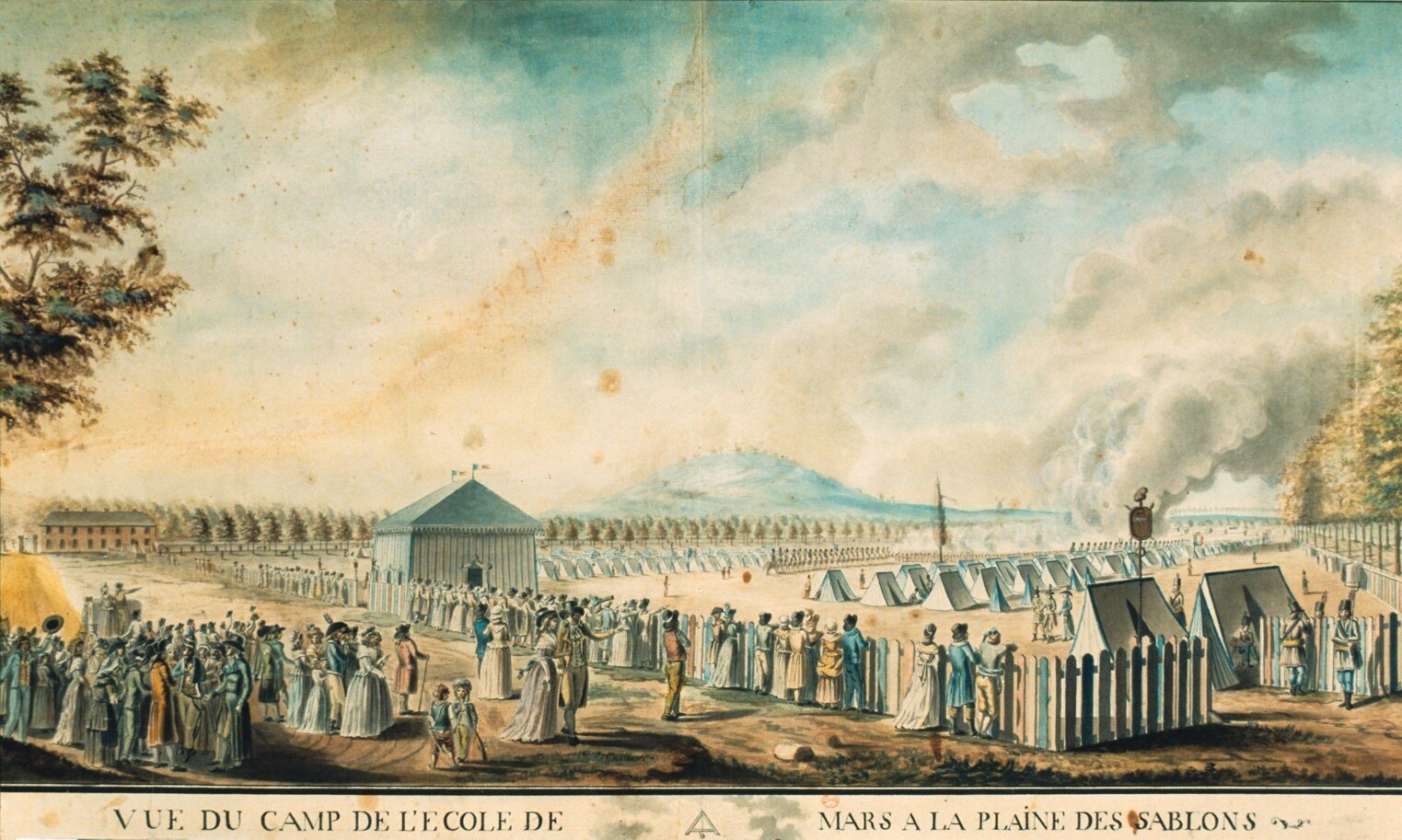
The camp of the École de Mars on La Plaine des Sablons (published c. 1795)

In May 1794, the Committee of Public Safety created a new military school for teenage boys called the École de Mars (transl. School of Mars). Given Le Bas's record as a représentant en mission and his status as an "object of boyish hero worship", he was one of two members of the Convention appointed to lead the new school. A total of 3,000 boys came from all over France to enroll, mostly from sans-culottes families of artisans or peasants. They learned how to use firearms and run drills, and they were "almost frantic with Revolutionary patriotism". Le Bas believed in the potential of the students, but historian Ernest Hamel asserts that Robespierre was unimpressed. According to Hamel, Robespierre was known to go to the school at least once a week to "haranguer les élèves", or harangue the students.

== Marriage and issue ==
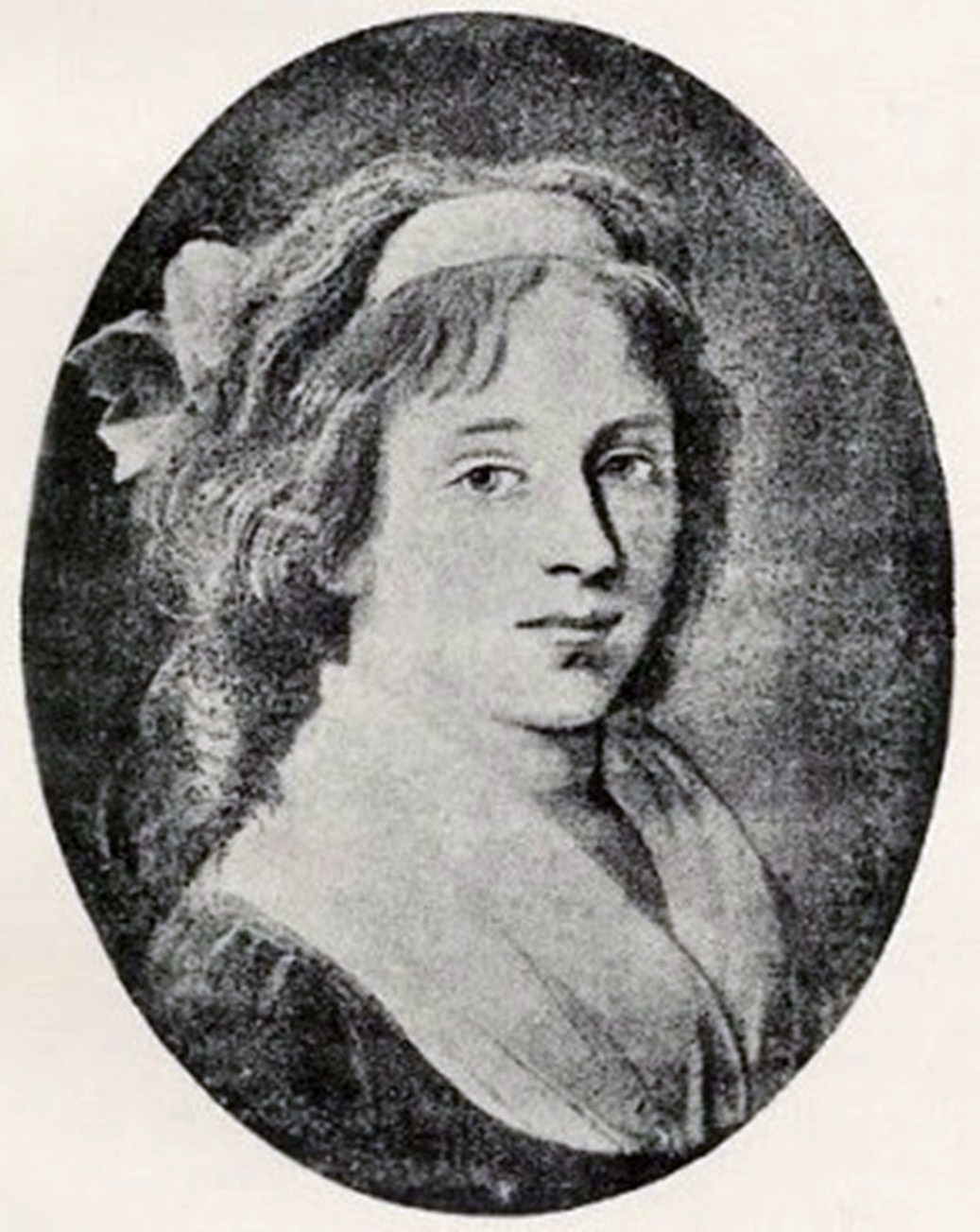
Élisabeth Le Bas in 1794

Le Bas first met his wife Élisabeth Duplay—the daughter of Robespierre's host, Maurice Duplay—on 24 April 1793, the same day Jean-Paul Marat was acquitted by the Revolutionary Tribunal. Le Bas and Duplay continued to see each other at the assembly under the supervision of a chaperone, usually Charlotte Robespierre, and they exchanged gifts with one another. Their courtship was interrupted when Le Bas suddenly fell ill and was unable to go to the assembly for a time. They spent over two months apart before they were reunited by chance at the Jacobin Club, when Duplay was reserving seats to see Robespierre speak.

With Robespierre's blessing, Le Bas proposed to Duplay. However, the marriage almost did not come to pass after scandalous rumors about Duplay and her family were printed in a newspaper called the Le Rougiff. Duplay wrote in her memoirs that she was dismayed to learn that one of Le Bas's acquaintances had falsely accused her of having many lovers, no education, and no fortune from her family. Ultimately, Le Bas took Robespierre's advice and dismissed the rumors as lies. A journalist and fellow deputy, Armand-Joseph Guffroy, had invented the accusations because he had hoped Le Bas would marry his daughter instead. (Note: Robespierre looked down on Guffroy with contempt ("méprisait souverainement"). Guffroy later became a key figure in the Thermidorian Reaction.)

On 26 August 1793 (10 Fructidor, Year I), Le Bas and Duplay were married in Paris. Robespierre and the painter Jacques-Louis David were among the witnesses, and Jacques-René Hébert officiated the wedding ceremony. On 17 June 1794 (29 Prairial, Year II), they had a son also named Philippe. Their son would go on to become Louis-Napoléon Bonaparte's tutor until 1827, then director of the library of the Sorbonne (1846–1860), a member of the Académie des Inscriptions et Belles-Lettres (1838–60), and president of the Institut de France (from 1858).

== Fall of Robespierre and death ==
On 26 July 1794 (8 Thermidor, Year II), Robespierre gave a controversial speech before the National Convention calling for the arrest of secret enemies of the Republic and defending himself against charges that he was seeking more power. He did not call for an end to the Terror, which led his political opponents to believe they needed to act quickly, before they were targeted. The next day on 27 July (9 Thermidor), Robespierre was denounced as a tyrant and shouted down when he tried to take the podium. Members shouted: "It is Danton's blood that is choking him!" The Convention called for Robespierre's arrest, and "his friend Philippe Le Bas showed [his] devotion by demanding to be arrested with him."

By the authority of the Convention, Le Bas was arrested with Robespierre, Saint-Just, Couthon, and Augustin Robespierre. However, they were not detained long, because the prisons were staffed by Robespierre's supporters, who refused to incarcerate them. His wife Élisabeth met him when he was released from the Conciergerie prison and accompanied him to the Hôtel de Ville. When they arrived at the hotel, he urged her to go back home, because he anticipated that he would soon be killed. He then joined Robespierre and other deputies inside the Hôtel de Ville to debate their next steps while guardsmen assembled at the Place de Grève nearby to defend them.

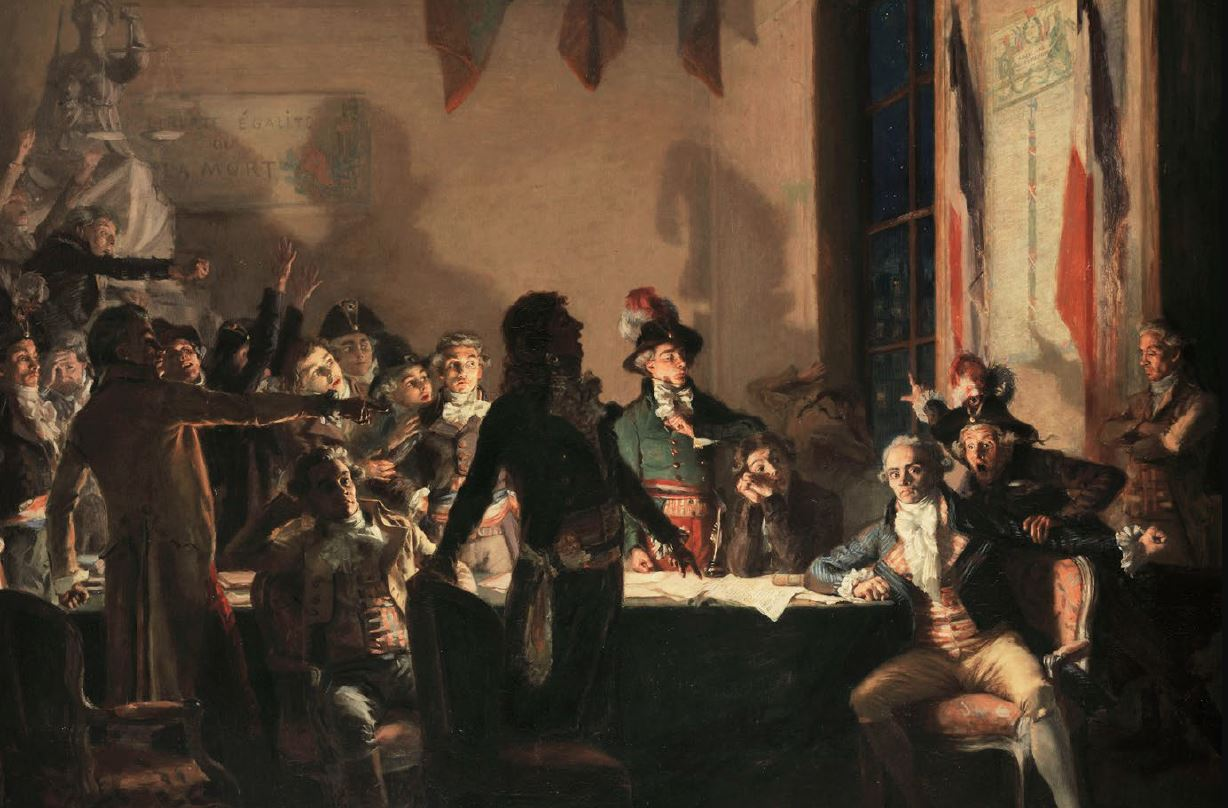
La Nuit du 9 au 10 thermidor (1897) by Jean-Joseph Weerts

The evening was "chaotic", and the anti-Robespierrists were "panic-stricken" by news of Robespierre's movements. Pierre-Louis Bentabole went to the École de Mars to verify that the students were still loyal to the Convention. After he confirmed that the students "all wanted to come to the Convention to make a rampart for it with their bodies," the students were assigned to guard artillery. In his 1901 biography of Le Bas, Paul Coutant (nom de plume: Stéfane-Pol) asserts that Le Bas did not exercise his influence over the students of the École de Mars. However, historian R. R. Palmer says that Le Bas tried to rally the students from city hall but was unsuccessful and ultimately "outmaneuvered" by the committees.

When the forces of the Convention learned that Robespierre and his deputies were no longer under arrest, they went to the Hôtel de Ville to confront them. The guardsmen assembled at Place de Grève had already dispersed. In the early hours of 28 July (10 Thermidor), Robespierre was shot in the jaw, either by his own hand or by Charles-André Merda. As the anti-Robespierrists broke in, Le Bas grabbed a pistol and killed himself with it. At 07:00 on 28 July, Le Bas's body was moved to the Arsenal section of Saint-Paul cemetery. Later that same day, Robespierre and survivors of the raid were tried by the Revolutionary Tribunal and executed by guillotine.

In his final moments, Le Bas had been drafting a letter to an ally named Labretèche, who was commander of the Camp des Sablons for the École de Mars. His last written words were:

Un complot affreux vient d'éclater. Je suis au nombre des représentants fidèles que les conspirateurs ont fait arrêter. Mes soupçons sur la destination du camp sont réalisés: c'est à toi de l'opposer à ce que l'on ne l'abuse pas au point de s'égorger lui-même en marchant sous les étendards des traitres. Le peuple l'observe; il est déterminé à se sauver : songe à lui être fidèle.

Translation:

A terrible plot has been uncovered. I am among the loyal representatives whom the conspirators have arrested. My suspicions about the destination of the camp have been realized: it is up to you to prevent it from being abused to the point of slaughtering itself under the banners of traitors. The people are watching; they are determined to save themselves. Remember to be loyal to them.

After Le Bas's death, his wife Élisabeth and their five-week-old son were arrested and imprisoned. They endured a "grim existence" and were transferred between multiple prisons, including La Petite Force and Talaru prison on rue de Richelieu. Their imprisonment lasted for 100 days until they were granted merciful release by the Committee of General Security.
