= Maurice Duplay =

French carpentry contractor and revolutionary (1736–1820)

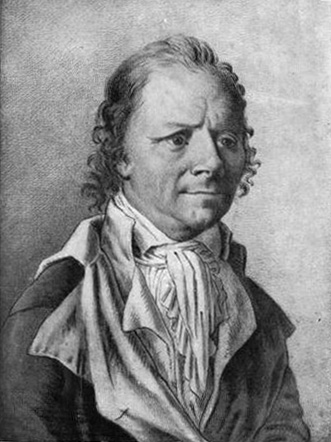
Maurice Duplay

Maurice Duplay (French pronunciation: [mɔʁis dyplɛ]; 1736, Saint-Didier-La Séauve - 1820, Paris) was a French carpentry contractor and revolutionary in the French Revolution. In September 1793 he became a member of the Revolutionary Tribunal. He was landlord to Maximilien de Robespierre, Charlotte Robespierre, Augustin Robespierre and Georges Couthon.

On the evening of 17 July, after the Champ de Mars massacre, the authorities ordered numerous arrests. Robespierre, who attended the Jacobin club, did not dare to go back to the rue Saintonge where he lodged, and so asked Laurent Lecointre if he knew a patriot near the Tuileries who could put him up for the night. Lecointre suggested Duplay's house and took him there. Maurice Duplay, a cabinetmaker and ardent admirer lived at 398 Rue Saint-Honoré near the Tuileries. After a few days Robespierre decided to move in, although he lived there in the backyard so that he was constantly exposed to the sound of working. He was motivated by a desire to live closer to the Assembly and the meeting place of the Jacobins in the Rue Saint-Jacques.

According to his friend, the surgeon Joseph Souberbielle, Joachim Vilate, and Duplay's daughter Élisabeth, Robespierre became engaged to Duplay's eldest daughter Éléonore, but his sister Charlotte Robespierre vigorously denied this and also claimed that Augustin refused to marry her. The men in the family (Maurice, his son and nephew) were all actively involved in official duties thanks to Robespierre's patronage. On 29 October 1793 Duplay became a member of the Revolutionary Tribunal.

In September 1792 Robespierre's younger sister and brother joined him and lived in the front house, but Charlotte insisted moving to 5 Rue Saint-Florentin because of his increased prestige and her tensions with Madame Duplay. Augustin moved out from the Duplays when he was sent on a mission to the Midi in August 1793. When he returned on 19 December Augustin decided not to move in with Charlotte; they were no longer on speaking terms. On 19 February 1794, Maximilien decided therefore to return to the Duplays.

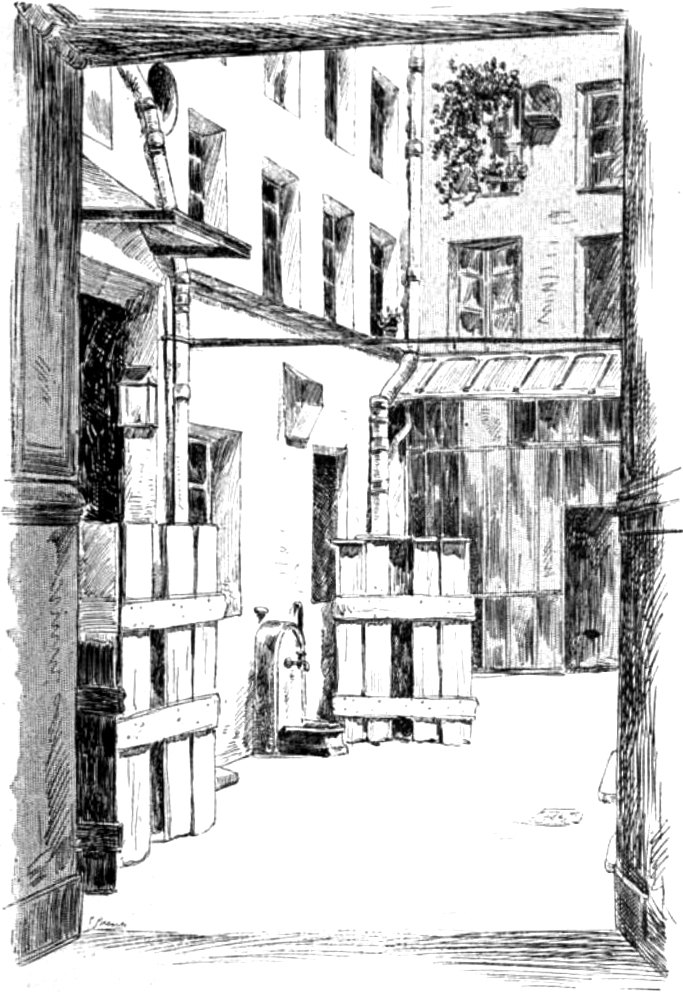
Courtyard of the house of Maurice Duplay, Robespierre's landlord. Robespierre's residence was on the second floor.

On July 26 1794 members of the family Duplay were arrested and at four taken to Sainte-Pélagie Prison.
