= Jérôme-Étienne-Marie Richardot =

French general (1751–1794)

Jérôme-Étienne-Marie Richardot (29 June 1751 – 6 March 1794) was a French general of the French Revolutionary Wars. He rose to colonel of the 9th Regiment of Mounted Chasseurs on 26 January 1793, then to général de brigade on 7 April that year. However, he was arrested for inability later in 1793 by Philippe-François-Joseph Le Bas and died in prison in the Conciergerie in 1794.

== See also ==
- List of French generals of the Revolutionary and Napoleonic Wars

== Sources ==
- Six, Georges (1934). Dictionnaire biographique des généraux et amiraux de la Révolution et de l'Empire, Vol. II (in French). Paris, France: Librairie historique et nobiliaire. ISBN 978-2-402-49916-3.
