= Fall of Maximilien Robespierre =

1794 event during the French Revolution

Coup of 9–10 Thermidor
- Part of the French Revolution
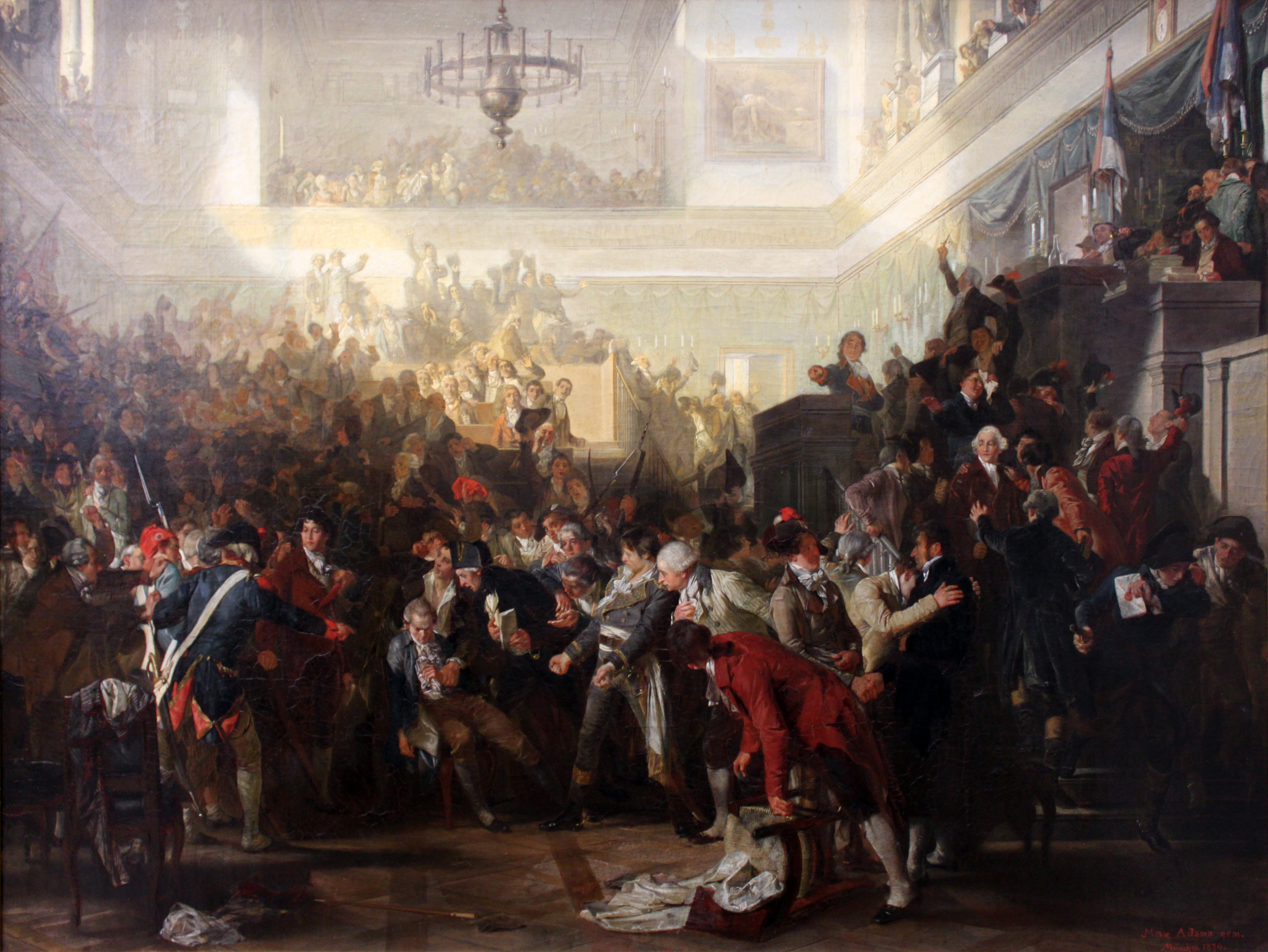
- Fall of Robespierre in the Convention by Max Adamo
Date	27 July 1794
Location	Paris, France
Result	Thermidorian victory: Fall of the Montagnards; Arrest and execution of Robespierre; End of the Reign of Terror; Beginning of the Thermidorian Reaction

Belligerents
Thermidorians; Supported by: National Convention; National Guard; Committee of General Security	Jacobins; Supported by: National Guard (loyalists); Sans-culottes

Commanders and leaders
Paul Barras; Jean-Lambert Tallien; Joseph Fouché; Pierre-Louis Bentabole; Charles-André Merda	Maximilien Robespierre (executed); Louis de Saint-Just (executed); Georges Couthon (executed); François Hanriot (executed); Augustin Robespierre (executed)

Strength
Unknown	c. 3,000 loyalists

Casualties and losses
Unknown	Various people were executed: 21 Robespierrists; 70 Communards; 78 Montagnard deputies

During the French Revolution, Maximilien Robespierre addressed the National Convention on 26 July 1794, was arrested the next day, and executed the day after, on 28 July. In his speech on 26 July, Robespierre spoke of the existence of internal enemies, conspirators, and calumniators, within the Convention and the governing Committees. He refused to name them, which alarmed the deputies who feared Robespierre was preparing another purge of the Convention, similar to previous ones during the Reign of Terror.

On the following day, this tension in the Convention allowed Jean-Lambert Tallien, one of the conspirators whom Robespierre had in mind in his denunciation, to turn the Convention against Robespierre and demand his arrest. By the end of 28 July, Robespierre was executed by guillotine on the Place de la Révolution. Robespierre's fall led to the implementation of more moderate policies during the Thermidorian Reaction, which soon followed.

== Background ==
=== Purge of the Hébertists and Dantonists ===
On 27 July 1793, Robespierre was elected to the Committee of Public Safety and would remain a member until his death. Between September 1793 and July 1794, the Committee's power increased dramatically through several measures instated during the Reign of Terror, such as the Law of Suspects and the Law of 14th Frimaire, becoming the de facto executive branch of the revolutionary government, under the supervision of the National Convention.

During this time, two different factions rose in opposition to the restructured revolutionary government: the left-wing ultra-revolutionaries and the moderate right-wing citra-revolutionaries. The left (known as Hébertists or exagérés) gathered around Jacques Hébert, as well as leaders of the Paris Commune and the exagérés of the Cordeliers Club. They pushed for stronger repression measures than those already in place during the Terror and campaigned for dechristianization. The right (known as Dantonists or Indulgents) formed around Georges Danton as well as the indulgents members of the Cordeliers Club, including Camille Desmoulins. They were strongly opposed to the machinery of the Terror and policies of the Committee of Public Safety. Both these factions were charged as conspirators against the revolutionary government and sentenced to the guillotine: the Hébertists on 24 March (4 Germinal) and the Dantonists on 5 April (16 Germinal).

With these purges, the power of the Committee was reaffirmed. However, the deaths of Danton and Desmoulins, both formerly friends of Robespierre, took a deep toll on him. This, combined with the increasing demands of both the Committee of Public Safety and the National Convention, washed away Robespierre's mental and physical health to the point he was forced to reduce his presence in the Jacobin Club and the National Convention.

=== Division within the revolutionary government ===
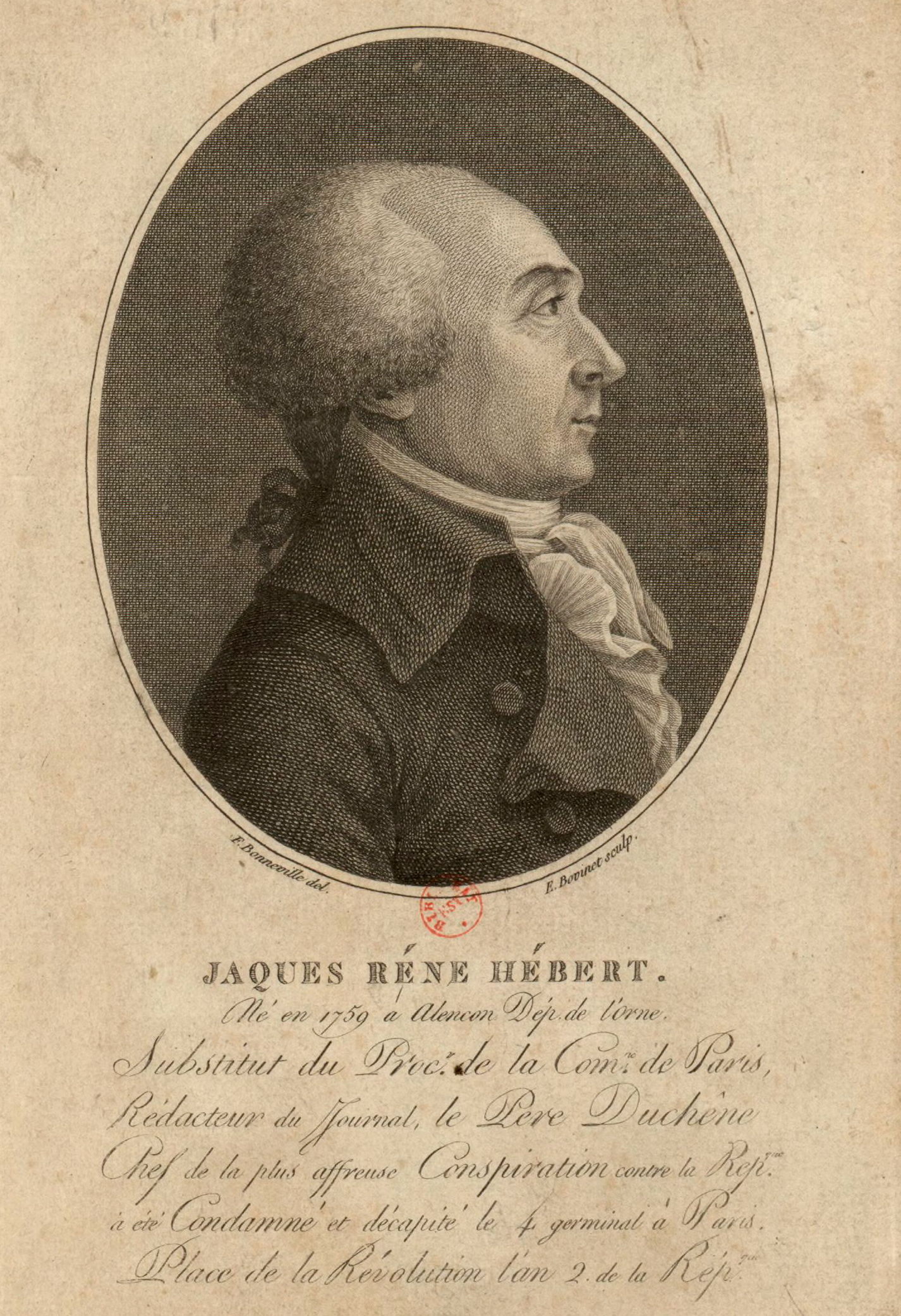
Jacques-René Hébert

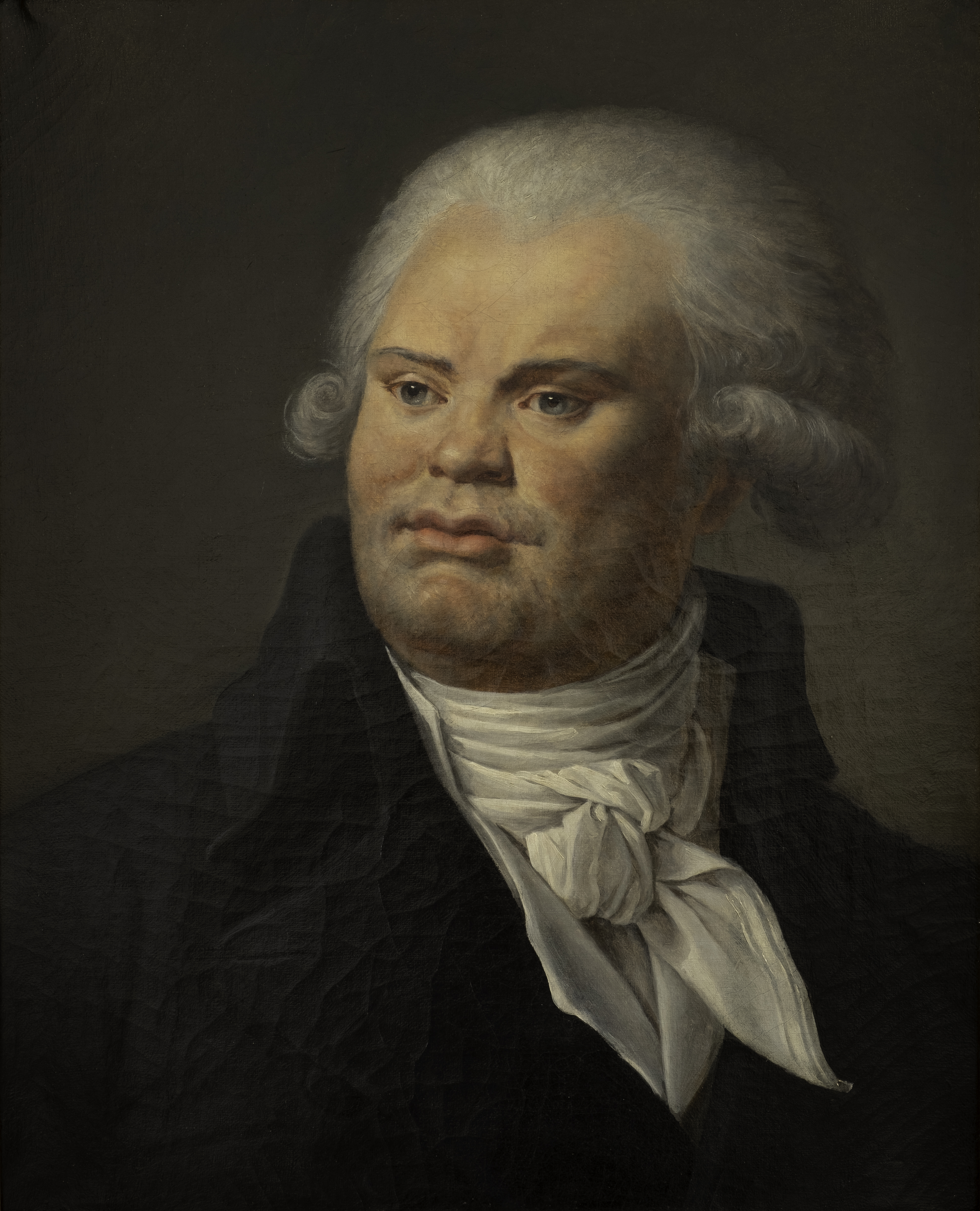
Georges Danton

Robespierre did not reappear in the National Convention until 7 May (18 Floréal). For this day he had planned a speech addressing the relationship between religion, morality, and the republican principles; and to establish the Cult of the Supreme Being in place of the Cult of Reason promoted by de-Christianizers like the Hébertists. On 21 May 1794 the revolutionary government decided that the Terror would be centralised, with almost all the tribunals in the provinces closed and all the trials held in Paris.

Robespierre led the processions during the Festival in Honor of the Supreme Being celebrated on 8 June (20 Prairial). Although the festival was well accepted by the crowds, Robespierre's prominent position in it was suspicious in the eyes of some deputies, and muttering began about Robespierre's fanaticism and desire for power. Two days after the festival, Robespierre pushed the National Convention to pass the Law of 22 Prairial drafted by him and Georges Couthon, which accelerated the trial process and extended the death penalty to include a new set of "enemies of the people"; this included those seeking to reestablish the monarchy, interfering with food provisions, discrediting the National Convention, and communicating with foreigners, among others. The fear of assassination drove Robespierre to take this measure: two assassination attempts against Robespierre and Collot d'Herbois had taken place on 23 and 24 May (4–5 Prairial), and the memory of Lepeletier's and Jean-Paul Marat's murders still roused feelings in the Convention. The law was not universally accepted in the Convention, and critics of Robespierre and Louis Antoine de Saint-Just would use it against them during the events of 9 Thermidor.

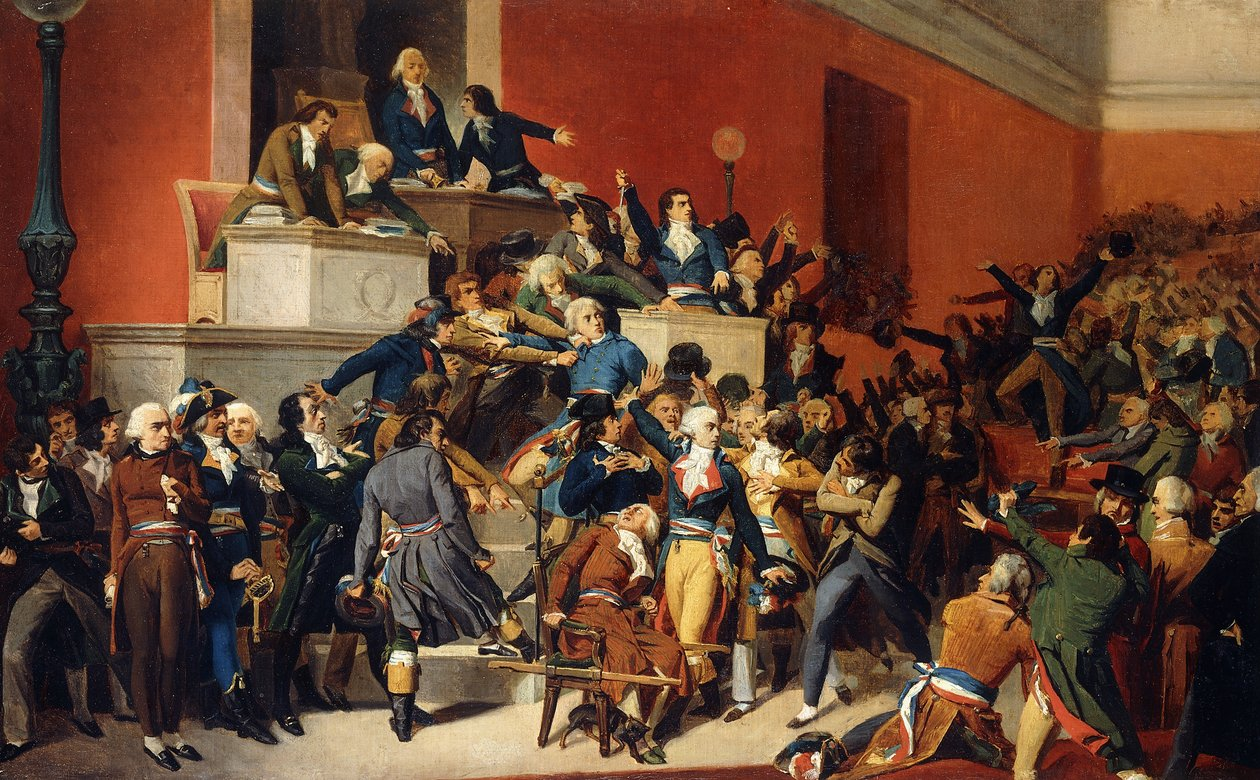
Raymond Quinsac Monvoisin Le 9 Thermidor

More opposition came from the Committee of General Security, which had not been consulted over the contents of the law. The Committee of General Security already felt threatened by the Committee of Public Safety's new ability to issue arrest warrants, as well as by the Police Bureau, which had been created by Saint-Just and was being run by Robespierre in his absence, and whose functions overlapped with that of the Committee of General Security. As payment, they presented a report on the ties between the English enemy and the self-proclaimed "Mother of God", Catherine Théot, who had prophesied that Robespierre was a new Messiah. This was done both with the intention of diminishing Robespierre, and to mock his religious positions and the Cult of The Supreme Being.

On 28 June (10 Messidor) Saint-Just returned from the northern front bearing news: the Revolutionary Army had defeated the Austrian army in Belgium at the Battle of Fleurus, securing the road to Paris. This victory signaled the end of the war against the Austrians, and with it, the end of the Terror government. Robespierre, wishing to get rid of both internal and external enemies, objected to the disbandment of the war government. The following day, in a joint meeting of the Committees of Public Safety and General Security, Lazare Carnot allegedly shouted at Saint-Just that both he and Robespierre were "ridiculous dictators". Following this event, Robespierre stopped participating directly in the deliberations of the Committee of Public Safety.

Having abandoned both the Committee and the National Convention, which he stopped frequenting after his presidency ended on 18 June (30 Prairial), Robespierre's absence allowed the breach between him and other members of the revolutionary government to widen. He did not reappear until 23 July (5 Thermidor), when he sat for another joint convention of the two Committees put forward in a failed attempt to resolve their mutual differences.

== Events ==
=== 8 Thermidor (26 July) ===
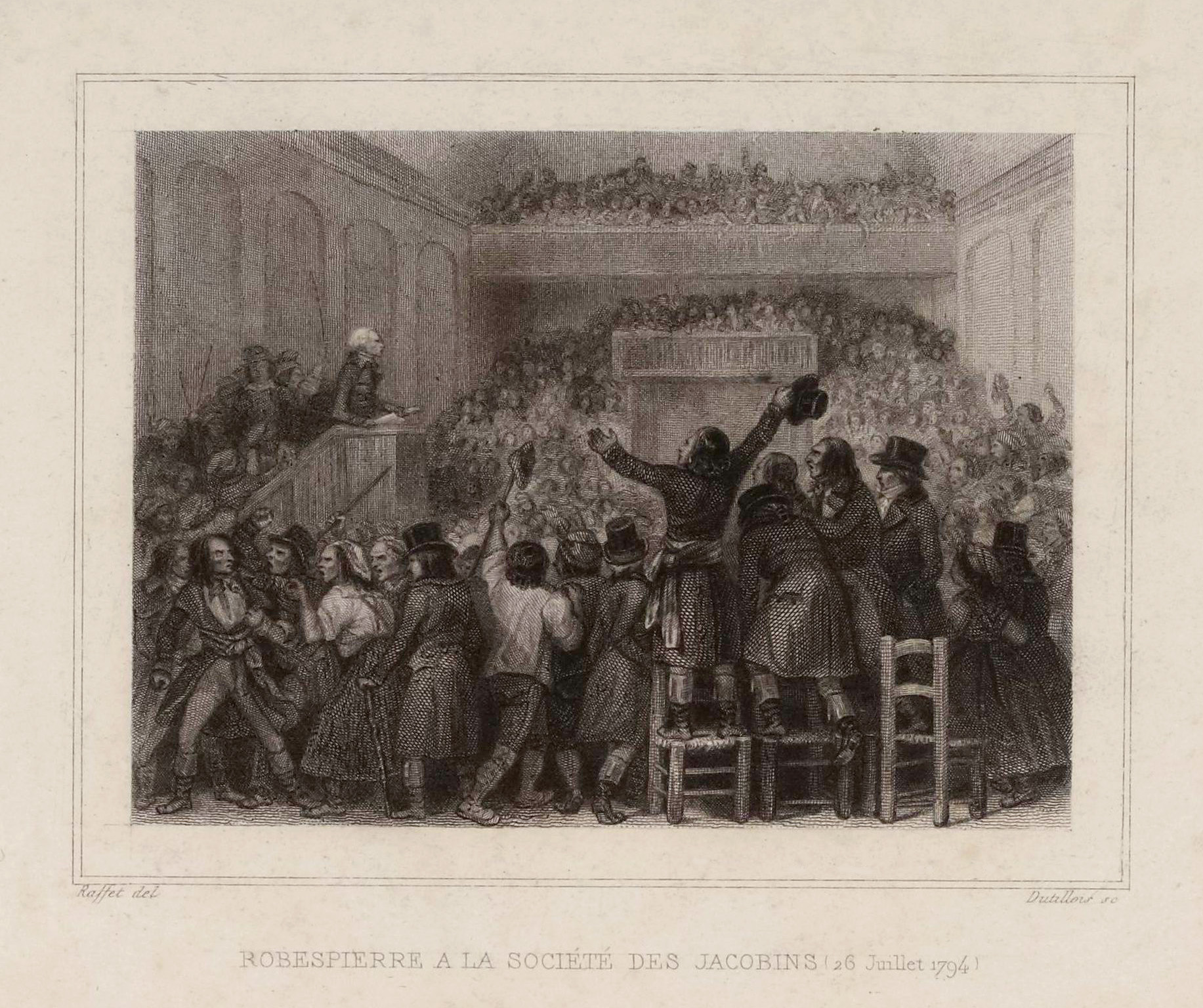
Robespierre à la Société des Jacobins - Auguste Raffet

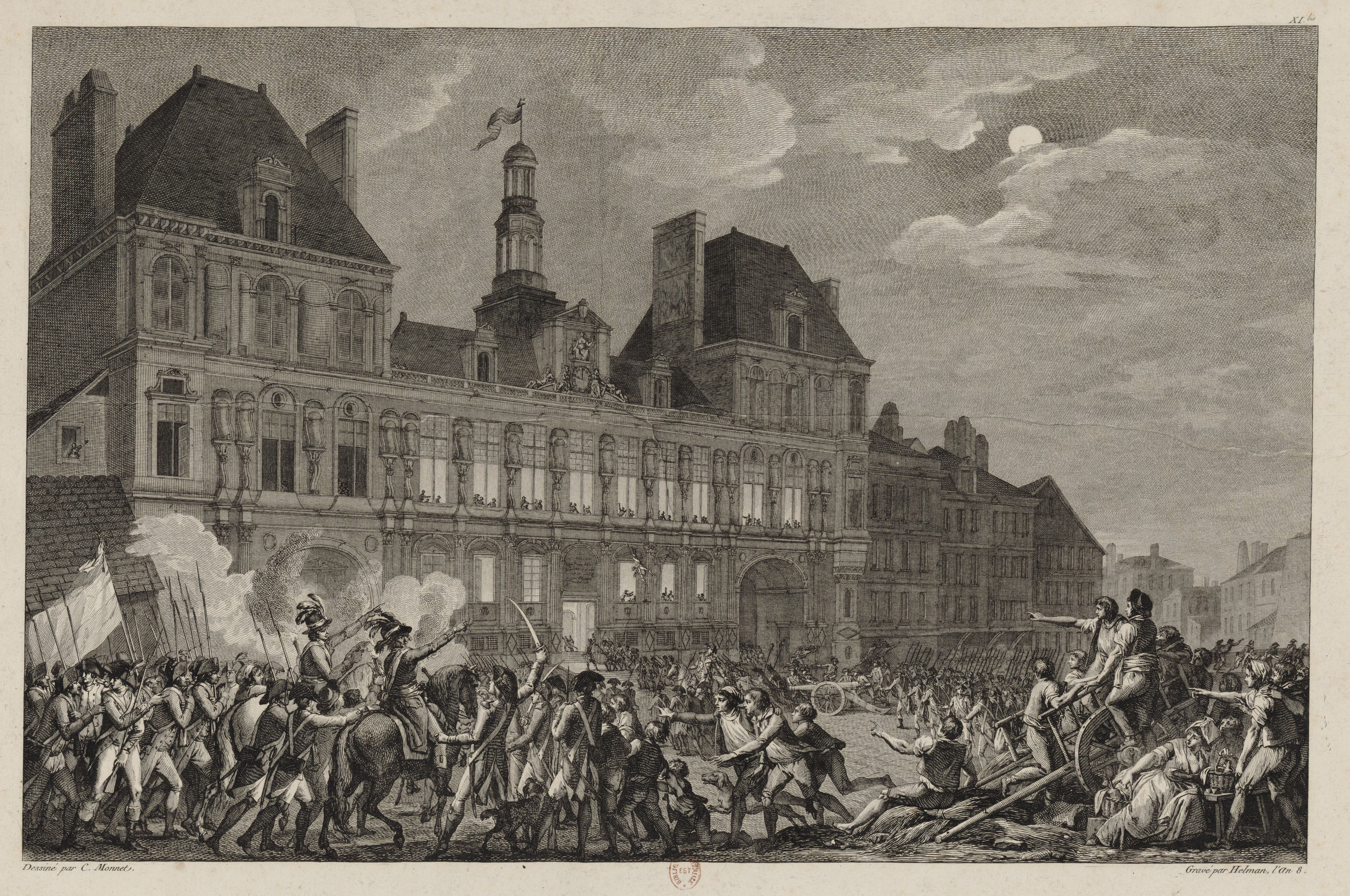
The attack on 9 Thermidor

During his absence from both the National Convention and the Committee of Public Safety through the months of June and July (Messidor), Robespierre prepared a speech to be delivered on 26 July (8 Thermidor). He delivered the speech first to the National Convention and later that same day at the Jacobin Club. In it, he attempted both to defend himself from the rumors and attacks on his person that had been spreading since the start of the Reign of Terror; and to bring light to an anti-revolutionary conspiracy that he believed reached into the Convention and the Governing Committees.

Although he accused three deputies by name (Pierre-Joseph Cambon, François René Mallarmé, and Dominique-Vincent Ramel-Nogaret), his speech seemed to incriminate several others. Moreover, it was precisely because he failed to name the condemned that terror spread through the Convention as the deputies started thinking that Robespierre was planning yet another purge like that of the Dantonists and Hébertists.

Later the same day he presented the speech at the Jacobin Club, where it was received with overwhelming support despite some initial opposition. Both Jacques Nicolas Billaud-Varenne and Jean-Marie Collot d'Herbois, who opposed the printing of the speech, were driven out of the Jacobin Club.

=== 9 Thermidor (27 July) ===
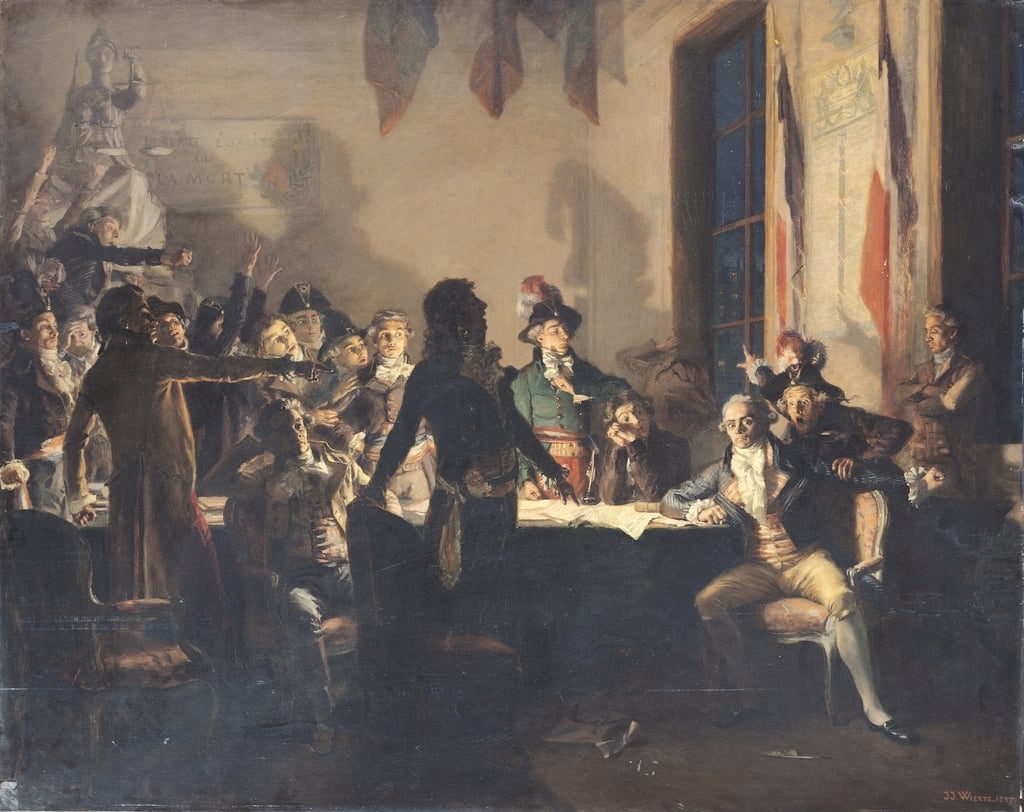
Saint-Just and Robespierre at the Hôtel de Ville of Paris on the night of 9 to 10 Thermidor Year II (July 27 to 28, 1794). Painting by Jean-Joseph Weerts

On 27 July, the weather was stormy. The workers of Paris organized a demonstration against the wage restrictions imposed by the Law of the General Maximum. At noon Saint-Just started addressing the Convention without having shown his speech to the two Committees. He was interrupted by Jean-Lambert Tallien who complained that both Robespierre and Saint-Just had broken with the Committees and spoke only for themselves; and then by Billaud-Varenne, who related how he and Collot had been driven out of the Jacobin Club the previous day, and who accused Robespierre of conspiracy against the Convention. Robespierre attempted to defend himself but was silenced by the commotion within the Convention and by the screaming deputies condemning him as a tyrant and conspirator.

The Convention then voted to arrest five deputies – Robespierre, his brother, Couthon, Saint-Just and Le Bas – as well as François Hanriot and other Robespierrist officials. They were taken before the Committee of General Security and sent to different prisons. None of the city prisons wanted to arrest the deputies and officials, and once a deputation from the Paris Commune, which had risen in support of Robespierre, arrived to the city prisons demanding they refuse to take in the arrested, the prison officials complied. A little after midnight, about 50 people, the five rebellious deputies, Hanriot and René-François Dumas consulted on the first floor of the Hôtel de Ville.

=== 10 Thermidor (28 July) ===
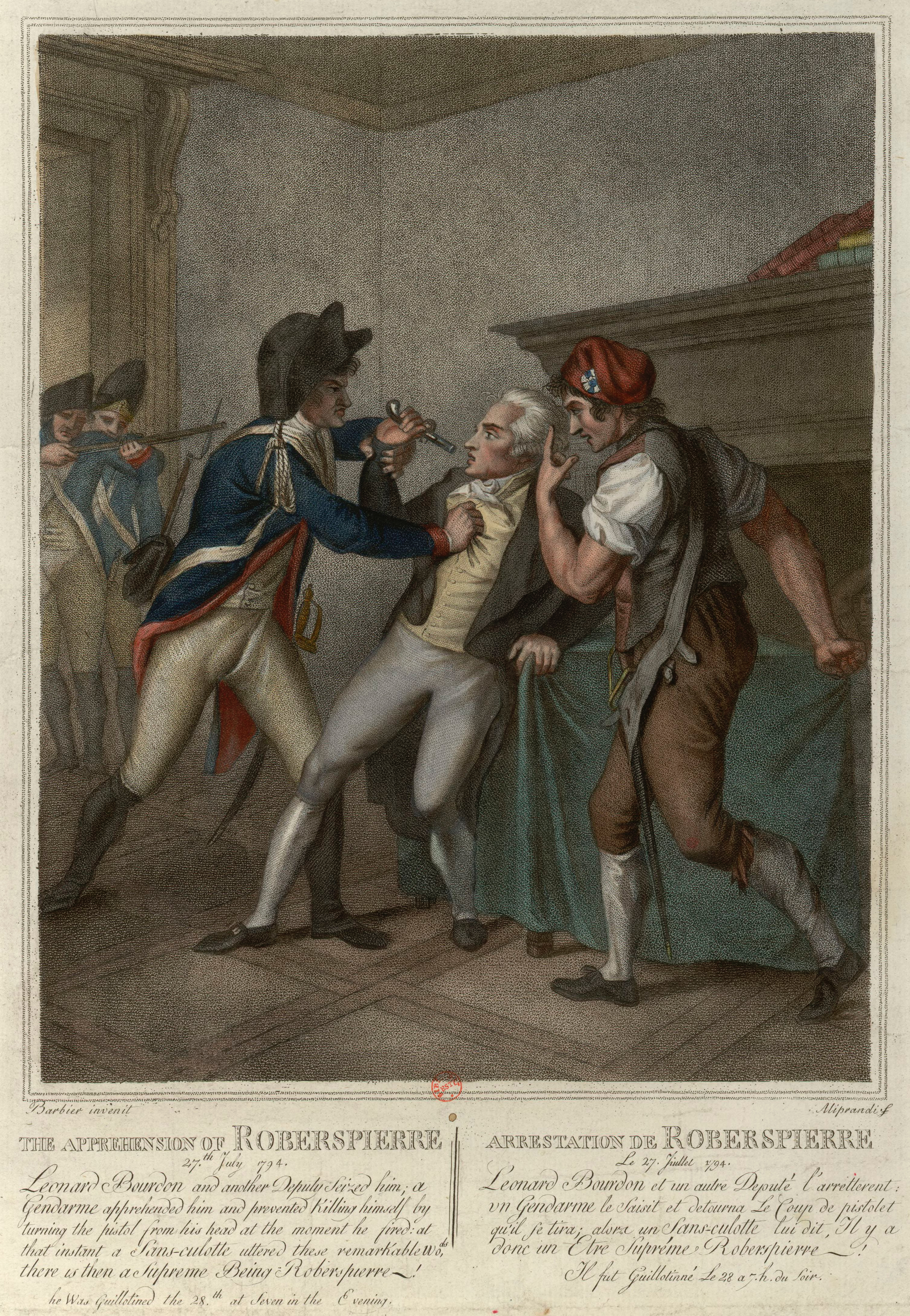
Arrestation de Robespierre

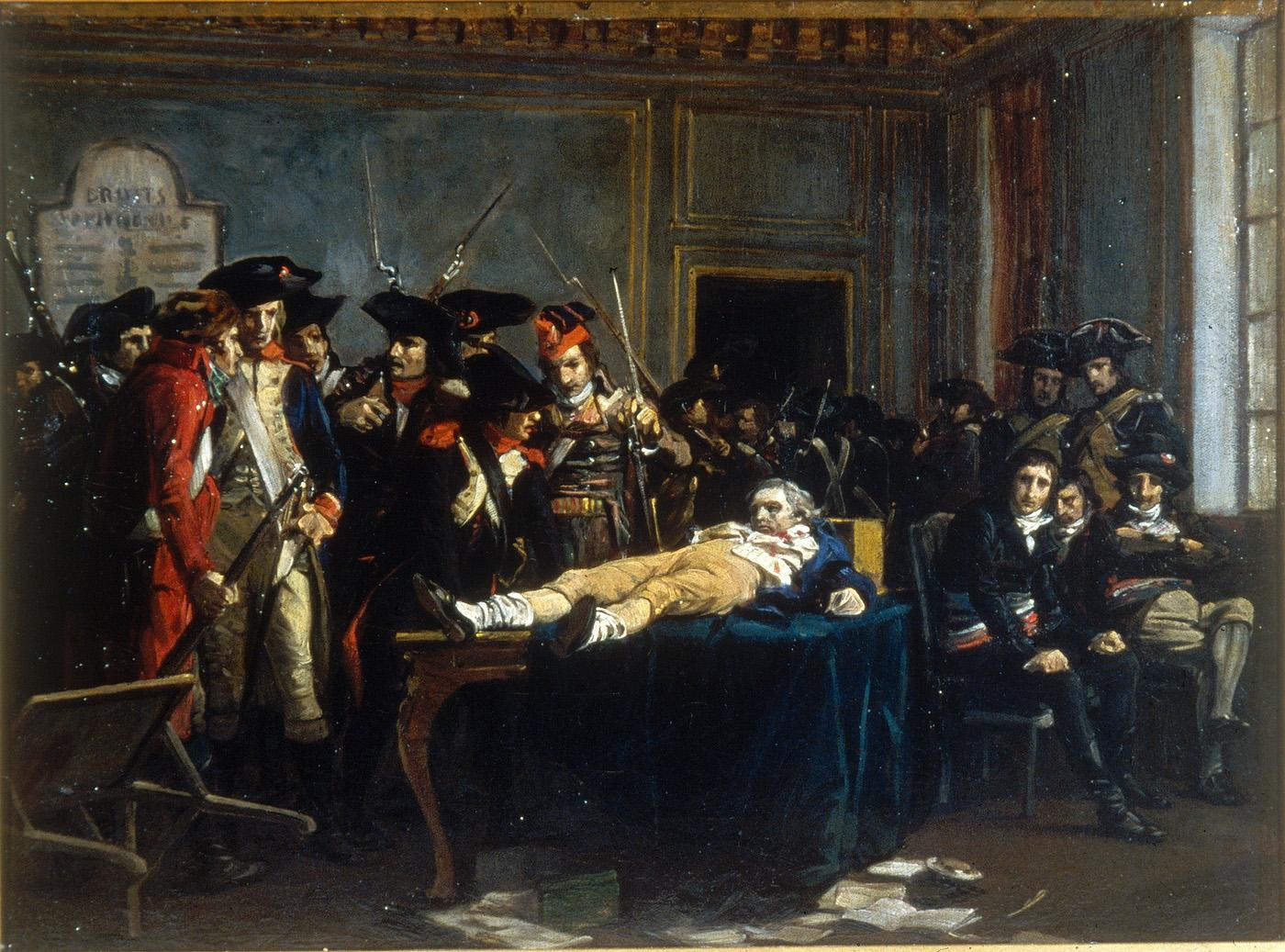
Lying on a table, Robespierre is the object of the curiosity and quips of Thermidorians, (Musée de la Révolution française)

Upon receiving news that Robespierre and his allies had not been imprisoned, the National Convention, which was in permanent session, declared that Robespierre, Saint-Just, and the other deputies were outlaws, and commanded armed forces to enter the Hôtel de Ville. By 2:30 a.m., they had entered the Hôtel de Ville and made the arrest. During the arrest, Le Bas killed himself, and both Robespierre and his brother were wounded.

There are two conflicting accounts of how Robespierre was wounded: the first one puts forward that Robespierre had tried to kill himself with a pistol, and the second one is that he was shot by Charles-André Meda, one of the officers occupying the Hôtel de Ville. Robespierre was taken out of the Hôtel de Ville with a broken jaw and spent the remainder of the night at the antechamber of the Committee of General Security.

The next day, according to the French Revolutionary calendar a day of rest and festivities, he was brought to the Revolutionary Tribunal around 2 p.m. together with 21 Robespierrists (including Hanriot) and condemned to death. In the early evening the convicts were taken in three carts to the Place de la Révolution. A mob screaming curses accompanied the procession. His face still swollen, Robespierre kept his eyes closed. He was the tenth called to the platform and ascended the steps of the scaffold unassisted. When clearing Robespierre's neck, executioner Charles-Henri Sanson tore off the bandage that was holding his shattered jaw in place, causing him to produce an agonised scream until his death. He was guillotined at the same place where King Louis XVI, Danton and Desmoulins had been executed.

== Public memorials ==
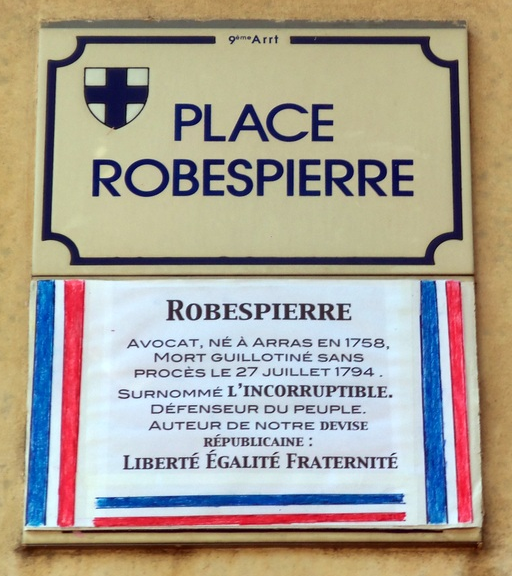
Place Robespierre in Marseille with the inscription: "Lawyer, born in Arras in 1758, guillotined without trial on 27 July 1794. Nicknamed the Incorruptible. Defender of the people. Author of our republican motto: Liberté, égalité, fraternité"

=== Street names ===
Robespierre is one of the few revolutionaries not to have a street named for him in the center of Paris. Following the Liberation of Paris and end of World War II, the municipal council (elected on 29 April 1945 with 27 communists, 12 socialists and 4 radicals out of 48 members) decided on 13 April 1946 to rename the Place du Marché-Saint-Honoré "Place Robespierre", a decision approved at the prefectorial level on 8 June. However, in the wake of political changes in 1947, it reverted to its original name on 6 November 1950. Streets in the so-called "Red belt" bear his name, e.g., at Montreuil. There is also a Metro station "Robespierre" on Line 9 (Mairie de Montreuil – Pont de Sèvres), in the commune of Montreuil, named during the era of the Popular Front. There are, however, numerous streets, roads, and squares named for him elsewhere in France.

=== Plaques and monuments ===
During the Soviet era, the Russians built two statues of him, one in Leningrad and another in Moscow (the Robespierre Monument). The monument was commissioned by Vladimir Lenin, who referred to Robespierre as a Bolshevik before his time. Due to the poor construction of the monument (it was made of tubes and concrete), it crumbled within three days of its unveiling and was never replaced. The Robespierre Embankment in Saint-Petersburg across Kresty prison returned to its original name Voskresenskaya Embankment in 2014.

=== Arras ===
- On 14 October 1923, a plaque was placed on the house at 9 Rue Maximilien Robespierre (formerly Rue des Rapporteurs) rented by the three Robespierre siblings in 1787–1789, in the presence of the mayor Gustave Lemelle, Albert Mathiez and Louis Jacob. Built in 1730, the house has had a varied history as a typing school, and a craftsmen's museum, but is now being developed as a Robespierre Museum.
- In 1994, a plaque was unveiled by ARBR on the façade of the Carrauts' brewery on the Rue Ronville, where Maximilien and Augustin were brought up by their grandparents.
- An Art Deco marble bust by Maurice Cladel was intended to be displayed in the gardens of the former Abbey of Saint-Vaast. A mixture of politics and concerns about weathering led to it being placed in the Hôtel de Ville. After many years in a tribunal room, it can now be seen in the Salle Robespierre. Bronze casts of the bust were made for the bicentenary and are displayed in his former home on Rue Maximilien Robespierre and at the Lycée Robespierre, unveiled in 1990.

=== Paris and elsewhere ===
- Robespierre is commemorated by two plaques in Paris, one on the exterior of the Duplays' house, now 398 rue Saint-Honoré, the other, erected by the Société des études robespierristes in the Conciergerie.
- In 1909, a committee presided over by René Viviani and Georges Clemenceau proposed erecting a statue in the garden of the Tuileries, but press hostility and failure to garner enough public subscriptions led to its abandonment. However, Robespierre is recognisable in François-Léon Sicard's marble Altar of the National Convention (1913), originally intended for the gardens of the Tuileries and now in the Panthéon.
- A stone bust by Albert Séraphin (1949) stands in the square Robespierre, opposite the theatre in Saint-Denis, with the inscription: "Maximilien Robespierre l'Incorruptible 1758–1794".
- Charles Correia's 1980s bronze sculptural group at the Collège Robespierre in Épinay-sur-Seine depicts him and Louis Antoine de Saint-Just at a table, working on the 1793 Constitution and Declaration of Human Rights. A mural in the school also depicts him.
- In 1986, Claude-André Deseine's terracotta bust of 1791 was bought for the new Musée de la Révolution française at Vizille. This returned to public view Robespierre's only surviving contemporary sculpted portrait. A plaster cast of it is displayed at the Conciergerie in Paris, and a bronze cast is in the Place de la Révolution Française in Montpellier, with bronzes of other figures of the time.

=== Resistance units ===
In the Second World War, several French Resistance groups took his name: the Robespierre Company in Pau, commanded by Lieutenant Aurin, alias Maréchal; the Robespierre Battalion in the Rhône, under Captain Laplace; and a maquis formed by Marcel Claeys in the Ain.

== See also ==
- Thermidorian Reaction
