= List of heads of state of France =

Monarchs ruled the Kingdom of France from the establishment of Francia in 481 to 1870, except for certain periods from 1792 to 1852. Since 1870, the head of state has been the President of France. Below is a list of all French heads of state. It includes the kings of the Franks, the monarchs of the Kingdom of France, emperors of the First and Second Empire and leaders of the five Republics.

== Carolingian dynasty (843–888) ==
The Carolingians were a Frankish noble family with origins in the Arnulfing and Pippinid clans of the 7th century AD. The family consolidated its power in the 8th century, eventually making the offices of mayor of the palace and dux et princeps Francorum hereditary and becoming the real powers behind the Merovingian kings. The dynasty is named after one of these mayors of the palace, Charles Martel, whose son Pepin the Short dethroned the Merovingians in 751 and, with the consent of the Papacy and the aristocracy, was crowned King of the Franks. Under Charles the Great (r. 768–814), better known as "Charlemagne", the Frankish kingdom expanded deep into Central Europe, conquering Italy and most of modern Germany. He was succeeded by his son Louis the Pious (r. 814–840), who eventually divided the kingdom between his sons. His death, however, was followed by a 3-year-long civil war that ended with the Treaty of Verdun. Modern France developed from West Francia, while East Francia became the Holy Roman Empire and later Germany.

Louis the Pious made many divisions of the Carolingian Empire during his lifetime. The final division, pronounced at Worms in 838, made Charles the Bald heir to the west, including Aquitaine, and Lothair heir to the east, including Italy and excluding Bavaria, which was left for Louis the German. However, following the emperor's death in 840, the empire was plunged into a civil war that lasted three years. The Frankish kingdom was then divided by the Treaty of Verdun in 843. Lothair was allowed to keep his imperial title and his kingdom of Italy, and granted the Middle Francia, a corridor of land stretching from Italy to the North Sea, and including the Low Countries, the Rhineland (including Aachen), Burgundy, and Provence. Charles was confirmed in Aquitaine, where Pepin I's son Pepin II was opposing him, and granted West Francia (modern France), the lands west of Lothair's Kingdom. Louis the German was confirmed in Bavaria and granted East Francia (modern Germany), the lands east of Lothair's kingdom.

Portrait	Name	Reign	Succession	Life details
	Charles II "the Bald" (Note: Louis the Pious and Charlemagne are both enumerated as "Louis I" and "Charles I" in the lists of French and German monarchs.)	c. 10 August 843 (Note: Charles II was crowned emperor on 25 December 875. For later Frankish and German emperors, see Holy Roman Emperor.) – 6 October 877 (34 years and 2 months)	Son of Louis the Pious and grandson of Charlemagne; recognized as king after the Treaty of Verdun	13 June 823 (Note: Older scholars give his birth as 15 May, the ides of May. However, ancient sources record his birth as 13 June, the ides of June.) – 6 October 877 (aged 54) King of Aquitaine since 838. Crowned "Emperor of the Romans" on Christmas 875. Died of natural causes
	Louis II "the Stammerer" (Note: Not to be confused with Louis II the German, son of Louis the Pious and king of East Francia (Germany). Both French and German monarchs saw themselves as the successors of Charlemagne, hence why many rulers share the same regnal name.)	6 October 877 (Note: Louis II was crowned on 8 December 877.) – 10 April 879 (1 year, 6 months and 4 days)	Son of Charles the Bald	1 November 846 – 10 April 879 (aged 32) King of Aquitaine since 867. Died of natural causes.
	Louis III	10 April 879 (Note: Louis III and Carloman II were crowned on September 879.) – 5 August 882 (3 years, 3 months and 26 days)	Son of Louis the Stammerer	863 – 5 August 882 (Note: Scholars give his death as either 3, 4, or 10 August, but ancient sources clearly indicates 5 August.) (aged 19) Ruled the North; died after hitting his head with a lintel while riding his horse.
	Carloman II	10 April 879 (Note: Louis III and Carloman II were crowned on September 879.) – 6 December 884 (5 years, 7 months and 26 days)	Son of Louis the Stammerer	866 – 6 December 884 (Note: Some modern sources give his death as "12 December", but this is a mistake.) (aged 18) Ruled the South; died after being accidentally stabbed by his servant.
	Charles (III) "the Fat" (Note: Charles the Fat was initially king of East Francia (Germany) and Holy Roman Emperor. Given that he was the third emperor with that name, he is also known as Charles III. He must not to be confused with Charles the Simple, who is also enumerated as Charles III. This discrepancy originates from the regnal number adopted by Charles V, the first French king to assume one.)	6 December 884 (Note: Charles the Fat was most likely crowned on 20 May 885. He was already king of East Francia since 28 August 876. He was also crowned emperor on 12 February 881.) – 11 November 887 (Note: This is the most accepted and cited date, although it is not entirely confirmed.) (2 years, 11 months and 5 days)	Son of Louis II the German, king of East Francia, and grandson of Louis I	839 (Note: In older sources his birth was dated to 832, but nowadays 839 is the accepted date.) – 13 January 888 (aged 48–49) King of East Francia since 876; crowned Emperor in 881. Last ruler to control all Frankish territories. Deposed by the nobility, later dying of natural causes

== Robertian dynasty (888–898) ==
Portrait / coin	Name	Reign	Succession	Life details
	Odo; Eudes or Odon	29 February 888 (Note: Odo was crowned on 29 February 888 and then again on 13 November.) – 3 January 898 (9 years, 10 months and 15 days)	Son of Robert the Strong; elected king by the French nobles following the deposition of Charles	c. 858 – 3 January 898 (Note: Odo's death is universally given as 1 January, as given by a late 13th century chronicle, but the earliest source on the matter, from the early 11th century, records his death as 3 January. Another source, from the 13th century, records his death as 2 January.) (aged approx. 40) Defended Paris from the Vikings; died of natural causes
–	Ranulf; Rannoux or Ranulph (rival king in Aquitaine)	888 – 890 (disputed; 2 years)	Briefly elected king of Aquitaine by the nobles in opposition to Odo	c. 850 – 5 August 890 (aged approx. 40) Supposedly poisonned while on a trip to Paris
	Guy; Guido or Wido (rival)	February (Note: Crowned anti-king in February 888 in Langres with the support of the counts of Vermandois and Flanders, as well as the bishops of Reims, Langres, and Senlis.) – November 888 (disputed; 10 months)	Crowned king at Langres in opposition to Odo	Also Emperor and King of Italy (889–894). Abandoned his claim after Odo's second coronation

== Carolingian dynasty (898–922) ==
Portrait / coin	Name	Reign	Succession	Life details
	Charles III "the Simple"	3 January 898 (Note: Charles III was crowned on 28 January 893, in opposition to Odo. (Note: Unless otherwise noted, the coronation dates and locations are given in the entry references.)) – 29 June 922 (24 years, 5 months and 26 days)	Posthumous son of Louis II the Stammerer; proclaimed king in opposition to Odo in January 893	17 September 879 – 7 October 929 (aged 50) Deposed by Robert's followers; later captured by Herbert II, Count of Vermandois. Died in captivity

== Robertian dynasty (922–923) ==
Portrait / coin	Name	Reign	Succession	Life details
Non-contemporary	Robert I	29 June 922 (Note: Robert I was crowned on 30 June 922.)– 15 June 923 (11 months and 17 days)	Son of Robert the Strong and younger brother of Odo	865 – 15 June 923 (aged 58) Killed at the Battle of Soissons against Charles III. Sole king to die in battle

== Bosonid dynasty (923–936) ==
Portrait / coin	Name	Reign	Succession	Life details
	Rudolph; Rodolphe or Raoul	15 June 923 (Note: Rudolph was crowned on 13 July 923.)– 14 January 936 (12 years, 6 months and 30 days)	Son of Richard, Duke of Burgundy and son-in-law of Robert I	c. 890 – 14 January 936 (aged approx. 45) Duke of Burgundy since 921. Died of illness after a reign of constant civil war and viking raids. Lost Lotharingia (Lorraine) to Henry I of Germany

== Carolingian dynasty (936–987) ==
Portrait / coin	Name	Reign	Succession	Life details
	Louis IV "from Overseas"	19 June 936 (Note: Louis IV was crowned on 19 June 936, following a brief interregnum after the death of Rudolph.) – 10 September 954 (18 years, 2 months and 22 days)	Only son of Charles the Simple, recalled to France by Hugh the Great after being exiled to England	921 – 10 September 954 (aged 33) Died after falling off his horse
Non-contemporary	Lothair; Lothaire	10 September 954 (Note: Lothair was crowned on 12 November 954.) – 2 March 986 (31 years, 5 months and 20 days)	Son of Louis IV	941 – 2 March 986 (aged 44) Died of natural causes
Non-contemporary	Charles (rival)	late 978 – 980 (Note: The exact date is uncertain, but he was crowned anti-king against his brother in late 978 by Dietrich I of Metz at the city of Laon.) (disputed; around 2 years)	Revolted against his brother with the help of the German king Otto the Great	c. 953 – after 992 (aged approx. 40) Abandoned his claim after being beaten by his brother and Hugh Capet
Non-contemporary	Louis V "the Do-Nothing"	2 March 986 (Note: Louis V was crowned on 8 June 979.) – 22 May 987 (1 year, 2 months and 20 days)	Son of Lothair	967 – 22 May 987 (Note: Some scholars give his death as 21 May, but contemporary sources give 22 May.) (aged 20) Last carolingian ruler in West Francia; Died in a hunting accident

== Capetian dynasty (987–1792) ==
The Capetian dynasty is named for Hugh Capet, a Robertian who served as Duke of the Franks and was elected King in 987. Except for the Bonaparte-led Empires, every monarch of France was a male-line descendant of Hugh Capet. The kingship passed through patrilineally from father to son until the 14th century, a period known as Direct Capetian rule. Afterwards, it passed to the House of Valois, a cadet branch that descended from Philip III. The Valois claim was disputed by Edward III, the Plantagenet king of England who claimed himself as the rightful king of France through his French mother Isabella; the two houses fought the Hundred Years' War over the issue, and with Henry VI of England being for a time partially recognized as King of France. The Valois line died out in the late 16th century, during the French Wars of Religion, to be replaced by the distantly related House of Bourbon, which descended through the Direct Capetian Louis IX. The Bourbons would rule France until deposed in the French Revolution, though they would be restored to the throne after the fall of Napoleon. The last Capetian to rule would be Louis Philippe I, king of the July Monarchy (1830–1848), a member of the cadet House of Bourbon-Orléans.

=== House of Capet (987–1328) ===
The House of Capet are also commonly known as the "Direct Capetians".

Portrait	Name	Arms	Reign	Succession	Life details
	Hugh "Capet"; Hugues (Note: "Capet" (Latin: Cappetus) was not actually a name, but a nickname adopted by later historians. It probably derived from chappe, an ecclesiastical mantle wore at the Abbey of Saint Martin of Tours.)		1 June 987 (Note: Hugh was elected and crowned king on 1 June 987, in Noyon. He was crowned again on 3 July in Paris by the archbishop of Reims. The latter date is usually regarded as the "official" start of the Capetian dynasty.) – 24 October 996 (9 years, 4 months and 23 days)	Elected king by the French nobles. Son of Hugh the Great and grandson of Robert I (Note: Hugh was also descendant of Charlemagne's sons Louis the Pious and Pepin of Italy through his mother and paternal grandmother, respectively, and was also a nephew of Otto I, Holy Roman Emperor.)	c. 941 – 24 October 996 (aged c. 55) Duke of the Franks since 956. Died of natural causes.
Non-contemporary	Charles (rival; second reign)		987 – 991 (Note: Second corronation date unknown.) (disputed; around 3 years)	Revolted a second time as the last Carolingian pretender to the throne.	c. 953 – after 992 (aged approx. 40) Captured by Hugh Capet in 991 and imprisoned in Orléans where he seemingly died (Note: He was then buried in the Basilica of Saint Servatius in Maastricht)
	Robert II "the Pious"		24 October 996 (Note: Robert II was crowned on 30 December 987.) – 20 July 1031 (34 years, 8 months and 26 days)	Only son of Hugh Capet	c. 970 – 20 July 1031 (aged approx. 60) Married thrice, getting excommunicated by the Catholic Church. Incorporated the Duchy of Burgundy
	Hugh (Note: Sometimes called "Hugh the Great", but this appears to be out of confusion with his great-grandfather, Hugh the Great (or possibly with Hugh, Count of Vermandois).) (junior king) (Note: Because neither Hugh nor Philip were sole or senior king in their own lifetimes, they are not traditionally listed as kings of France and are not given ordinals.)		19 June 1017 – 17 September 1025 (under Robert II)	Son of Robert II	c. 1007 – 17 September 1025 (aged approx. 18) Seemingly died after falling of his horse while preparing a rebellion against his father
	Henry I Henri		20 July 1031 (Note: Henry I was crowned on 14 May 1027.) – 4 August 1060 (29 years and 15 days)	Son of Robert II	4 May 1008 – 4 August 1060 (aged 52) His reign was marked with internal struggle against feudal lords
	Philip I "the Amorous"; Philippe		4 August 1060 (Note: Philip I was crowned on 23 May 1059.) – 29 July 1108 (47 years, 11 months and 25 days)	Son of Henry I	1052 – 29 July 1108 (aged 56) Ruled under the regency of Anne of Kiev and Count Baldwin V until 1066
	Louis VI "the Fat"		29 July 1108 (Note: Louis VI was crowned on 3 August 1108.) – 1 August 1137 (29 years and 3 days)	Son of Philip I	1 December 1081 – 1 August 1137 (aged 55) His reign contributed to the centralization of royal power. First king to wage war against the English
Non-contemporary	Philippe (junior king)		14 April 1129 – 13 October 1131 (under Louis VI)	Son of Louis VI	29 August 1116 – 13 October 1131 (aged 15) Died after falling from his horse
	Louis VII "the Young"		1 August 1137 (Note: Louis VII was crowned as a child on 25 October 1131, and again on 25 December 1137 alongside Eleanor of Aquitaine.) – 18 September 1180 (43 years, 1 month and 17 days)	Son of Louis VI	1120 – 18 September 1180 (aged 60) Known for his rivalry with Henry II of England and his military campaigns during the Second Crusade
	Philip II "Augustus"; Philippe Auguste		18 September 1180 (Note: Philip II was crowned on 1 November 1179.)– 14 July 1223 (42 years, 9 months and 26 days)	Son of Louis VII	21 August 1165 – 14 July 1223 (aged 57) Regarded as one of the greatest French rulers. First monarch to style himself as "King of France"
	Louis VIII "the Lion"		14 July 1223 (Note: Louis VIII was crowned on 6 August 1223.)– 8 November 1226 (3 years, 3 months and 25 days)	Son of Philip II	5 September 1187 – 8 November 1226 (aged 39) Proclaimed king of England in 1216, after which he led an unsuccessful invasion
	Louis IX "the Saint"		8 November 1226 (Note: Louis IX was crowned on 29 November 1226.)– 25 August 1270 (43 years, 9 months and 17 days)	Son of Louis VIII	25 April 1214 – 25 August 1270 (aged 56) Ruled under the regency of Blanche of Castile until 1234. Died during the 8th Crusade; only king to be venerated by the Catholic Church
	Philip III "the Bold"; Philippe		25 August 1270 (Note: Philip III was crowned on 30 August 1271.)– 5 October 1285 (15 years, 1 month and 10 days)	Son of Louis IX	3 April 1245 – 5 October 1285 (aged 40) Greatly expanded French influence in Europe. Died of a fever
	Philip IV "the Fair"; Philippe		5 October 1285 (Note: Philip IV was crowned on 6 January 1286.) – 29 November 1314 (29 years, 1 month and 24 days)	Son of Philip III	1268 – 29 November 1314 (aged 46) King of Navarre (as Philip I) since 16 August 1284, following his marriage with Joan I. Remembered for his struggle with the Roman papacy and his consolidation of royal power, which helped to reduce the influence of feudal lords
	Louis X "the Quarreller"		29 November 1314 (Note: Louis X was crowned on 24 August 1315.)– 5 June 1316 (1 year, 6 months and 7 days)	Son of Philip IV	3 October 1289 – 5 June 1316 (aged 26) King of Navarre (as Louis I) since 2 April 1305. His short reign was marked by conflicts with the nobility
	John I "the Posthumous"; Jean		15–19 November 1316 (4 days)	Posthumous son of Louis X	King for the four days he lived; youngest and shortest undisputed monarch in French history (Note: He lived from 15 to 19 November according to the continuator of Guillaume de Nangis. The Chronique Parisienne Anonyme de 1316 à 1339 gives 13 and 18 November. Modern sources often give his lifespan as 15–20 November.)
	Philip V "the Tall"; Philippe		20 November 1316 (Note: Philip V was crowned on 9 January 1317. (Note: Humphreys, p. 16 gives 6 January, the same date of Philip IV's coronation. This is a confusion.))– 3 January 1322 (5 years, 1 month and 14 days)	Son of Philip IV, brother of Louis X and uncle of John I	1293/4 – 3 January 1322 (aged 28–29) King of Navarre as Philip II. Died without a male heir
	Charles IV "the Fair"		3 January 1322 (Note: Charles IV was crowned on 21 February 1322.)– 1 February 1328 (6 years and 29 days)	Son of Philip IV and younger brother of Louis X and Philip V	1294 – 1 February 1328 (aged 34) King of Navarre as Charles I. Died without a male heir, ending the direct line of Capetians

=== House of Valois (1328–1589) ===
The death of Charles IV started the Hundred Years' War between the House of Valois and the House of Plantagenet, whose claim was taken up by the cadet branch known as the House of Lancaster, over control of the French throne. The Valois claimed the right to the succession by male-only primogeniture through the ancient Salic Law, having the closest all-male line of descent from a recent French king. They were descended from the third son of Philip III, Charles, Count of Valois. The Plantagenets based their claim on being closer to a more recent French king, Edward III of England being a grandson of Philip IV through his mother, Isabella.

The two houses fought the Hundred Years War to enforce their claims. The Valois were ultimately successful, and French historiography counts their leaders as rightful kings. One Plantagenet, Henry VI of England, enjoyed de jure control of the French throne following the Treaty of Troyes, which formed the basis for continued English claims to the throne of France until 1801. The Valois line ruled France until the line became extinct in 1589, in the backdrop of the French Wars of Religion. As Navarre did not have a tradition of male-only primogeniture, the Navarrese monarchy became distinct from the French with Joan II, a daughter of Louis X.

Portrait	Name	Arms	Reign	Succession	Life details
	Philip VI "the Fortunate"; Philippe		1 April 1328 (Note: Philip VI was crowned on 29 May 1328.) – 22 August 1350 (22 years, 4 months and 21 days)	Son of Charles, Count of Valois, grandson of Philip III and cousin of Charles IV	1293 – 22 August 1350 (aged 57) His reign was dominated by the consequences of a succession dispute, which led to the Hundred Years' War.
	John II "the Good"; Jean		22 August 1350 (Note: John II was crowned on 26 September 1350.) – 8 April 1364 (13 years, 7 months and 17 days)	Son of Philip VI	April 1319 (Note: Sources give his birth date as 6, 16, 20 or 26 April.) – 8 April 1364 (aged 45) Captured by the English at the Battle of Poitiers (1356); forced to sign a series of humiliating treaties
	Charles V "the Wise"		8 April 1364 (Note: Charles V was crowned on 19 May 1364.)– 16 September 1380 (16 years, 5 months and 8 days)	Son of John II; named Dauphin on 16 July 1349	21 January 1337 – 16 September 1380 (aged 43) His reign was marked with internal struggle against feudal lords and renewed conflict against the English
	Charles VI "the Mad" "the Beloved"		16 Sept 1380 (Note: Charles VI was crowned on 4 November 1380.)– 21 October 1422 (42 years, 1 month and 5 days)	Son of Charles V	3 December 1368 – 21 October 1422 (aged 53) Ruled under the regency of his uncles until 1388. Suffered a long period of mental illness before dying of natural causes
	Henry (II) (claimant)		21 October 1422 (Note: Henry (II) was crowned on 16 December 1431, at Notre-Dame de Paris.)– 19 October 1453 (Note: This is the date in which the last English holdout was expelled by the French, with the exception of Calais.) (disputed; 31 years)	Maternal grandson of Charles VI, recognized as heir after the Treaty of Troyes of 21 May 1420	6 December 1421 – 21 May 1471 (aged 49) King of England since 1 September 1422. Ruled under several regencies until 1437
	Charles VII "the Victorious" "the Well-Served"		21 October 1422 (Note: Charles VII was crowned on 17 July 1429.) – 22 July 1461 (38 years, 9 months and 1 day)	Son of Charles VI and uncle of Henry VI, named Dauphin in April 1417	22 February 1403 – 22 July 1461 (aged 58) His reign saw the end of the Hundred Years' War
	Louis XI "the Prudent" "the Universal Spider"		22 July 1461 (Note: Louis XI was crowned on 15 August 1461.) – 30 August 1483 (22 years, 1 month and 8 days)	Son of Charles VII	3 July 1423 – 30 August 1483 (aged 60) His reign saw the strengthening and expansion of royal power. Nicknamed "the Universal Spider" for the numerous intrigues during his rule
	Charles VIII "the Affable"		30 August 1483 (Note: Charles VIII was crowned on 30 May 1484.) – 7 April 1498 (14 years, 7 months and 8 days)	Son of Louis XI	30 June 1470 – 7 April 1498 (aged 27) Ruled under the regency of his sister Anne until 1491. Started the long and unsuccessful Italian Wars. Died after hitting his head on a lintel

==== House of Valois-Orléans (1498–1515) ====
Portrait	Name	Arms	Reign	Succession	Life details
	Louis XII "Father of the People"		7 April 1498 (Note: Louis XII was crowned on 27 May 1498.) – 1 January 1515 (16 years, 8 months and 25 days)	Great-grandson of Charles V. Second cousin, and by first marriage son-in-law, of Louis XI	27 June 1462 – 1 January 1515 (aged 52) Briefly conquered the Kingdom of Naples and the Duchy of Milan

==== House of Valois-Angoulême (1515–1589) ====
Portrait	Name	Arms	Reign	Succession	Life details
	Francis I "the Father of Letters"; François		1 January 1515 (Note: Francis I was crowned on 25 January 1515.) – 31 March 1547 (32 years, 2 months and 30 days)	Great-great-grandson of Charles V. First cousin once removed, and by first marriage son-in-law, of Louis XII	12 September 1494 – 31 March 1547 (aged 52) Remembered as a Renaissance patron of the arts and scholarship. Died of a fever
	Henry II; Henri		31 March 1547 (Note: Henry II was crowned on 26 July 1547.) – 10 July 1559 (12 years, 3 months and 10 days)	Son of Francis I, named Dauphin in August 1536	31 March 1519 – 10 July 1559 (aged 40) His reign saw the end of the Italian Wars. Died after being accidentally stabbed in a Jousting tournament
	Francis II; François		10 July 1559 (Note: Francis II was crowned on 18 September 1559.) – 5 December 1560 (1 year, 4 months and 25 days)	Son of Henry II	20 January 1544 – 5 December 1560 (aged 16) King consort of Scotland since 24 April 1558. A weak and sick boy, he remained under the regency of the House of Guise until his premature death
	Charles IX		5 December 1560 (Note: Charles IX was crowned on 15 May 1561.) – 30 May 1574 (13 years, 5 months and 25 days)	Younger brother of Francis II	27 June 1550 – 30 May 1574 (aged 23) Ruled under the regency of his mother Catherine until 1563, but remained under her influence until his death. The Wars of Religion began under his reign (1562). Best remembered for the Massacre of Vassy
	Henry III; Henri		30 May 1574 (Note: Henry III was crowned on 13 February 1575.) – 2 August 1589 (15 years, 2 months and 3 days)	Younger brother of Francis II and Charles IX; also related to the Bohemian and Polish monarchies	19 September 1551 – 2 August 1589 (aged 37) Initially ruler of Poland–Lithuania. (Note: Henry III was elected on 15 May 1573. He was crowned on 21 February 1574, but was declared deposed a year later, on 12 May 1575.) He reigned through the devastating Wars of Religion, which eventually led to his own assassination

=== House of Bourbon (1589–1792) ===
The Valois line looked strong on the death of Henry II, who left four male heirs. His first son, Francis II, died in his minority. His second son, Charles IX, had no legitimate sons to inherit. Following the premature death of his fourth son Hercule François and the assassination of his third son, the childless Henry III, France was plunged into a succession crisis over which distant cousin of the king would inherit the throne. The best claimant, King Henry III of Navarre, was a Protestant, and thus unacceptable to much of the French nobility.

Ultimately, after winning numerous battles in defence of his claim, Henry converted to Catholicism and was crowned as King Henry IV, founding the House of Bourbon. This marked the second time the thrones of Navarre and France were united under one monarch, as different inheritance laws had caused them to become separated during the events of the Hundred Years Wars. The House of Bourbon was overthrown during the French Revolution and replaced by a short-lived republic.

Portrait	Name	Arms	Reign	Succession	Life details
	Charles X (claimant)		2 August 1589 – 9 May 1590 (disputed; 9 months and 7 days)	7x great-grandson of Louis IX. Proclaimed king by the Catholic League in opposition to Henry of Navarre	22 December 1523 – 9 May 1590 (aged 66) Imprisoned by Henry III on 23 December 1588; remained his entire "reign" in captivity. Died of natural causes
	Henry IV "the Great" "the Good King"; Henri		2 August 1589 (Note: Henry IV was crowned on 27 February 1594.) – 14 May 1610 (20 years, 9 months and 12 days)	10th-generation descendant of Louis IX; also nephew of Charles (X) and by first marriage son-in-law of Henry II. Proclaimed king on Henry III's deathbed	13 December 1553 – 14 May 1610 (aged 56) King of Lower Navarre (as Henry III) since 10 June 1572. Killed in Paris on 14 May 1610 by Catholic fanatic François Ravaillac.
	Louis XIII "the Just"		14 May 1610 (Note: Louis XIII was crowned on 17 October 1610.) – 14 May 1643 (33 years)	Son of Henry IV	27 September 1601 – 14 May 1643 (aged 41) Last King of Lower Navarre (as Louis II). (Note: Lower Navarre was integrated into France during his reign.) Died of natural causes.
	Louis XIV "the Great" "the Sun King"		14 May 1643 (Note: Louis XIV was crowned on 7 June 1654.) – 1 September 1715 (72 years, 3 months and 18 days)	Son of Louis XIII	5 September 1638 – 1 September 1715 (aged 76) Ruled under the regency of his mother Anne of Austria until 1651. Longest reigning sovereign monarch in history
	Louis XV "the Beloved"		1 September 1715 (Note: Louis XV was crowned on 25 October 1722.) – 10 May 1774 (58 years, 8 months and 9 days)	Great-grandson of Louis XIV	15 February 1710 – 10 May 1774 (aged 64) Ruled under the regency of Philippe II, Duke of Bourbon-Orléans, until 1723
	Louis XVI		10 May 1774 (Note: Louis XVI was crowned on 11 June 1775.) – 21 September 1792 (Note: Louis XVI's powers as king became obsolete following the March on Versailles on 5 October 1789, after which he became a hostage of the revolutionary forces.) (18 years, 4 months and 11 days)	Grandson of Louis XV	23 August 1754 – 21 January 1793 (aged 38) Forced to install a constitutional monarchy after 1789. Formally deposed following the proclamation of the First Republic, executed in public
	Louis XVII (claimant)		21 January 1793 – 8 June 1795 (2 years, 4 months and 18 days; disputed)	Son of Louis XVI; named Dauphin on 4 June 1789	27 March 1785 – 8 June 1795 (aged 10) Imprisoned by the revolutionary forces on 13 August 1792. Remained his entire "reign" in captivity

== First Republic (1792–1804) ==
=== National Convention ===
From 22 September 1792 to 2 November 1795, the French Republic was governed by the National Convention, whose president (elected from within for a 14-day term) may be considered as France's legitimate head of state during this period. Historians generally divide the convention's activities into three periods, moderate, radical, and reaction, and the policies of presidents of the Convention reflect these distinctions. During the radical and reaction phases, some of the presidents were executed, most by guillotine, committed suicide, or were deported. In addition, some of the presidents were later deported during the Bourbon Restoration in 1815.

==== Moderate phase ====
Initially, La Marais, or The Plain, a moderate, amorphous group, controlled the Convention. At the first session, held on 20 September 1792, the elder statesman Philippe Rühl presided over the session. The following day, amidst profound silence, the proposition was put to the assembly, "That royalty be abolished in France"; it carried, with cheers. On the 22nd came the news of the Republic's victory at the Battle of Valmy. On the same day, the Convention decreed that "in future, the acts of the assembly shall be dated First Year of the French Republic". Three days later, the Convention added the corollary of "the French republic is one and indivisible", to guard against federalism.

The following men were elected for two-week terms as presidents, or executives, of the Convention.

Portrait	Name (Born–Died)	Term of office			Political party
Portrait	Name (Born–Died)	Took office	Left office	Time in office	Political party
	Jérôme Pétion de Villeneuve (1756–1794)	20 September 1792	4 October 1792	14 days	Girondins
	Jean-François Delacroix (1753–1794)	4 October 1792	18 October 1792	14 days	The Mountain
	Marguerite-Élie Guadet (1758–1794)	18 October 1792	1 November 1792	14 days	Girondins
	Marie-Jean Hérault de Séchelles (1759–1794)	1 November 1792	15 November 1792	14 days	The Mountain
	Henri Grégoire (1750–1831)	15 November 1792	29 November 1792	14 days	The Plain
	Bertrand Barère (1755–1841)	29 November 1792	13 December 1792	14 days	The Plain
	Jacques Defermon des Chapelières (1756–1831)	13 December 1792	27 December 1792	14 days	Girondins
	Jean-Baptiste Treilhard (1742–1810)	27 December 1792	10 January 1793	14 days	The Plain
	Pierre Victurnien Vergniaud (1753–1793)	10 January 1793	24 January 1793	14 days	Girondins
	Jean-Paul Rabaut Saint-Étienne (1743–1793)	24 January 1793	7 February 1793	14 days	Girondins
	Jean-Jacques Bréard (1751–1840)	7 February 1793	21 February 1793	14 days	The Mountain
	Edmond Louis Alexis Dubois-Crancé (1747–1814)	21 February 1793	7 March 1793	14 days	The Mountain
	Armand Gensonné (1758–1793)	7 March 1793	21 March 1793	14 days	Girondins
	Jean Debry (1760–1834)	21 March 1793	4 April 1793	14 days	The Plain
	Jean-François-Bertrand Delmas (1751–1798)	4 April 1793 (Note: From 9 Apr 1793 to 18 Apr 1793 the functions of president were exercised by vice-president Jacques-Alexis Thuriot de la Rosière. He was elected president in his own right for the fortnight 27 June 1793 – 11 July 1793)	18 April 1793	14 days	The Mountain
	Marc David Alba Lasource (1763–1793)	18 April 1793	2 May 1793	14 days	Girondins
	Jean-Baptiste Boyer-Fonfrède (1760–1793)	2 May 1793	16 May 1793	14 days	Girondins
	Maximin Isnard (1755–1825)	16 May 1793	30 May 1793	14 days	Girondins
	François René Mallarmé (1755–1835)	30 May 1793	13 June 1793	14 days	The Mountain

At the end of May 1793, an uprising of the Parisian sans culottes, the day-laborers and working class, undermined much of the authority of the moderate Girondins. At this point, although Danton and Hérault de Séchelles both served one more term each as Presidents of the Convention, the Girondins had lost control of the Convention: in June and July compromise after compromise changed the course of the revolution from a bourgeois event to a radical, working class event. Price controls were introduced and a minimum wage guaranteed to workers and soldiers. Over the course of the summer, the government became truly revolutionary.

==== Radical phase ====
After the insurrection, any attempted resistance to revolutionary ideals was crushed. The insurrection of 31 May – 2 June 1793 marked a significant milestone in the history of the French Revolution. The days of 31 May – 2 June (French: journées) resulted in the fall of the Girondin party under pressure of the Parisian sans-culottes, Jacobins of the clubs, and Montagnards in the National Convention. The following men were elected as presidents of the Convention during its transition from its moderate to radical phase.

Portrait	Name (Born–Died)	Term of office			Political party
Portrait	Name (Born–Died)	Took office	Left office	Time in office	Political party
	Jean-Marie Collot d'Herbois (1749–1796)	13 June 1793	27 June 1793	14 days	The Mountain
	Jacques Alexis Thuriot de la Rosière (1753–1829)	27 June 1793	11 July 1793	14 days	The Mountain
	Andre Jeanbon Saint Andre (1749–1813)	11 July 1793	25 July 1793	14 days	The Mountain
	Georges Jacques Danton (1759–1794)	25 July 1793	8 August 1793	14 days	The Mountain
	Marie-Jean Hérault de Séchelles (1759–1794)	8 August 1793	22 August 1793	14 days	The Mountain

The following men were elected as presidents of the Convention during its radical phase.

Portrait	Name (Born–Died)	Term of office			Political party
Portrait	Name (Born–Died)	Took office	Left office	Time in office	Political party
	Maximilien Robespierre (1758–1794)	22 August 1793	5 September 1793	14 days	The Mountain
	Jacques-Nicolas Billaud-Varenne (1756–1819)	5 September 1793	19 September 1793	14 days	The Mountain
	Pierre Joseph Cambon (1756–1820)	19 September 1793	3 October 1793	14 days	The Mountain
	Louis-Joseph Charlier (1754–1797)	3 October 1793	22 October 1793	19 days	The Mountain
	Moïse Antoine Pierre Jean Bayle (1755–1815)	22 October 1793	6 November 1793	15 days	The Mountain
	Pierre-Antoine Lalloy (1749–1846)	6 November 1793	21 November 1793	15 days	The Mountain
	Charles-Gilbert Romme (1750–1795)	21 November 1793	6 December 1793	15 days	The Mountain
	Jean-Henri Voulland (1751–1801)	6 December 1793	21 December 1793	15 days	The Mountain
	Georges Auguste Couthon (1755–1794)	21 December 1793	5 January 1794	15 days	The Mountain
	Jacques-Louis David (1748–1825)	5 January 1794	20 January 1794	15 days	The Mountain
	Marc Guillaume Alexis Vadier (1736–1828)	20 January 1794	4 February 1794	15 days	The Mountain
	Joseph-Nicolas Barbeau du Barran (1761–1816)	4 February 1794	19 February 1794	15 days	The Mountain
	Louis Antoine de Saint-Just (1767–1794)	19 February 1794	6 March 1794	15 days	The Mountain
	Philippe Rühl (1737–1795)	7 March 1794	21 March 1794	14 days	The Mountain
	Jean-Lambert Tallien (1767–1820)	21 March 1794	5 April 1794	15 days	The Mountain
	Jean-Baptiste-André Amar (1755–1816)	5 April 1794	20 April 1794	15 days	The Mountain
	Robert Lindet (1746–1825)	20 April 1794	5 May 1794	15 days	The Mountain
	Lazare Carnot (1753–1823)	5 May 1794	20 May 1794	15 days	The Mountain
	Claude-Antoine Prieur-Duvernois (1763–1832)	20 May 1794	4 June 1794	15 days	The Mountain
	Maximilien Robespierre (1758–1794)	4 June 1794	19 June 1794	15 days	The Mountain
	Élie Lacoste (1745–1806)	19 June 1794	5 July 1794	16 days	The Mountain
	Jean-Antoine Louis (1742–1796)	5 July 1794	19 July 1794	14 days	The Mountain

==== Reaction ====
On 27 July 1794, the National Convention voted for the arrest of Maximilien Robespierre, Louis Antoine de Saint-Just, and several allies, and they were executed the following day. This ended the most radical phase of the French Revolution. (Note: The name Thermidorian refers to 9 Thermidor Year II (27 July 1794), the date according to the French Revolutionary Calendar when Robespierre and other radical revolutionaries came under concerted attack in the National Convention. Thermidorian Reaction also refers to the remaining period until the National Convention was superseded by the Directory; this is also sometimes called the era of the Thermidorian Convention. Prominent figures of Thermidor include Paul Barras, Jean-Lambert Tallien, and Joseph Fouché. Neely, pp. 225–227.)

The following men were presidents of the Convention until its end.

Image	Dates	Name	DOD/Fate
	19 July 1794 – 3 August 1794	Jean-Marie Collot d'Herbois	8 June 1796
	3 August 1794 – 18 August 1794	Philippe Antoine Merlin, dit Merlin de Douai	26 December 1838
	18 August 1794 – 2 September 1794	Antoine Merlin de Thionville	14 September 1833
	2 September 1794 – 22 September 1794	André Antoine Bernard, dit Bernard de Saintes	19 October 1818
	22 September 1794 – 7 October 1794	André Dumont	19 October 1838
	7 October 1794 – 22 October 1794	Jean-Jacques-Régis de Cambacérès	8 March 1824; One of the few members of La Marais to be elected President; Authored Napoleon's Civil Code
	22 October 1794 – 6 November 1794	Pierre-Louis Prieur, dit Prieur de la Marne	31 May 1827
	6 November 1794 – 24 November 1794	Louis Legendre	13 December 1797, died of natural causes (dementia)
	24 November 1794 – 6 December 1794	Jean-Baptiste Clauzel	2 July 1803
	6 December 1794 – 21 December 1794	Jean-François Reubell	23 November 1807
	21 December 1794 – 6 January 1795	Pierre-Louis Bentabole	22 April 1798
	6 January 1795 – 20 January 1795	Étienne-François Le Tourneur	4 October 1817
	20 January 1795 – 4 February 1795	Stanislas Joseph François Xavier Rovère	died in 1798 in French Guiana
	4 February 1795 – 19 February 1795	Paul Barras	29 January 1829
	19 February 1795 – 6 March 1795	François Louis Bourdon	22 June 1798, after being deported to French Guiana
	6 March 1795 – 24 March 1795	Antoine Claire Thibaudeau	8 March 1854
	24 March 1795 – 5 April 1795	Jean Pelet, also Pelet de la Lozère	26 January 1842
	5 April 1795 – 20 April 1795	François-Antoine de Boissy d'Anglas	1828; One of the few members of La Marais to be elected President
	20 April 1795 – 5 May 1795	Emmanuel Joseph Sieyès	20 June 1836; One of the few members of La Marais to be elected President
	5 May 1795 – 26 May 1795	Théodore Vernier	3 February 1818
	26 May 1795 – 4 June 1795	Jean-Baptiste Charles Matthieu	31 October 1833
	4 June 1795 – 19 June 1795	Jean Denis, comte Lanjuinais	died in 1828 in Paris
	19 June 1795 – 4 July 1795	Jean-Baptiste Louvet de Couvray	25 August 1797
	4 July 1795 – 19 July 1795	Louis-Gustave Doulcet de Pontécoulant	17 November 1764 – 3 April 1853
	19 July 1795 – 3 August 1795	Louis-Marie de La Révellière-Lépeaux	24 March 1824
	3 August 1795 – 19 August 1795	Pierre Claude François Daunou	20 June 1840
	19 August 1795 – 2 September 1795	Marie-Joseph Chénier	10 January 1811
	2 September 1795 – 23 September 1795	Théophile Berlier	12 September 1844
	23 September 1795 – 8 October 1795	Pierre-Charles-Louis Baudin	1799
	8 October 1795 – 26 October 1795	Jean Joseph Victor Génissieu	27 October 1804

=== Directory ===
The Directory was officially led by a president, as stipulated by Article 141 of the Constitution of the Year III. An entirely ceremonial post, the first president was Jean-François Rewbell, who was chosen by lot on 2 November 1795. The Directors conducted their elections privately, with the presidency rotating every three months. The last President was Louis-Jérôme Gohier.

The leading figure of the Directory was Paul Barras, the only director to serve throughout the entirety of the Directory’s existence.

Political parties

Centre (Thermidorians) Right-wing (Clichyens) Left-wing (Montagnards) Other (Maraisards)

Directors of the Directory (1 November 1795 – 10 November 1799)
Paul Barras; 2 November 1795 – 9 November 1799	Louis-Marie de la Révellière; 2 November 1795 – 18 June 1799 (Compelled to resign)	Jean-François Rewbell; 2 November 1795 – 16 May 1799 (Replaced by sortition)	Lazare Carnot; 2 November 1795 – 4 September 1797 (Proscribed and replaced after the Coup of 18 Fructidor)	Étienne-François Letourneur; 2 November 1795 – 20 May 1797
Paul Barras; 2 November 1795 – 9 November 1799	Louis-Marie de la Révellière; 2 November 1795 – 18 June 1799 (Compelled to resign)	Jean-François Rewbell; 2 November 1795 – 16 May 1799 (Replaced by sortition)	Lazare Carnot; 2 November 1795 – 4 September 1797 (Proscribed and replaced after the Coup of 18 Fructidor)	François Barthélemy; 20 May – 4 September 1797 (Proscribed and replaced after the Coup of 18 Fructidor)
Paul Barras; 2 November 1795 – 9 November 1799	Louis-Marie de la Révellière; 2 November 1795 – 18 June 1799 (Compelled to resign)	Jean-François Rewbell; 2 November 1795 – 16 May 1799 (Replaced by sortition)	Philippe Antoine Merlin; 4 September 1797 – 18 June 1799 (Compelled to resign)	François de Neufchâteau; 4 September 1797 – 15 May 1798 (Replaced by sortition)
Paul Barras; 2 November 1795 – 9 November 1799	Louis-Marie de la Révellière; 2 November 1795 – 18 June 1799 (Compelled to resign)	Jean-François Rewbell; 2 November 1795 – 16 May 1799 (Replaced by sortition)	Philippe Antoine Merlin; 4 September 1797 – 18 June 1799 (Compelled to resign)	Jean-Baptiste Treilhard; 15 May 1798 – 17 June 1799 (Election annulled as irregular)
Paul Barras; 2 November 1795 – 9 November 1799	Louis-Marie de la Révellière; 2 November 1795 – 18 June 1799 (Compelled to resign)	Emmanuel Joseph Sieyès; 16 May – 9 November 1799	Philippe Antoine Merlin; 4 September 1797 – 18 June 1799 (Compelled to resign)	Jean-Baptiste Treilhard; 15 May 1798 – 17 June 1799 (Election annulled as irregular)
Paul Barras; 2 November 1795 – 9 November 1799	Roger Ducos; 18 June – 9 November 1799	Emmanuel Joseph Sieyès; 16 May – 9 November 1799	Jean-François Moulin; 18 June – 10 November 1799	Louis-Jérôme Gohier; 17 June – 10 November 1799

After the Coup of 18 Brumaire (9 November 1799), Barras, Ducos, and Sieyès resigned.
Moulin and Gohier, refusing to resign, were arrested by General Moreau.

=== Consulate ===
Consuls of the Consulate (10 November 1799 – 18 May 1804)
	First Consul	Second Consul	Third Consul
Provisional Consuls (10 November – 12 December 1799)	Napoléon Bonaparte	Emmanuel Joseph Sieyès	Roger Ducos
Consuls (12 December 1799 – 18 May 1804)	Napoléon Bonaparte	Jean-Jacques-Régis de Cambacérès	Charles-François Lebrun

Napoléon Bonaparte proclaimed himself Emperor of the French in 1804, reigning as Emperor Napoleon I 1804–1814 (First French Empire) and 1815 (Hundred Days).

The monarchy was restored 1814–1815 and 1815–1830 (Bourbon Restoration); again 1830–1848 (July Monarchy).

== House of Bonaparte, First French Empire (1804–1814) ==
Portrait	Name	Arms	Reign	Succession	Life details
	Napoleon I		18 May 1804 (Note: Napoleon I was crowned on 2 December 1804.) – 2 April 1814 (Note: The Sénat proclaimed the deposition in absentia of Napoleon on 2 April, which was followed by the Corps législatif on 3 April. Napoleon wrote an act of abdication on 4 April renouncing the throne in favour of his son. However, this was not accepted by the Coalition, so he wrote an unconditional abdication on 6 April renouncing his rights and that of his family.) (9 years, 10 months and 15 days)	First Consul of the French Republic following the coup d'état of 19 November 1799; proclaimed himself Emperor of the French in 1804	15 August 1769 – 5 May 1821 (aged 51) Conquered most of Europe in a series of successful wars; remembered as one of the greatest military commanders in history. Deposed in absentia and forced to abdicate, then exiled to the island of Elba
	Napoleon II (claimant)		4 – 6 April 1814 (2 days; disputed)	Son of Napoleon I, only named emperor in Napoleon's will.	20 March 1811 – 22 July 1832 (aged 21) Unrecognized by the Coalition and the Senate.

== House of Bourbon, First Restoration (1814–1815) ==
Portrait	Name	Arms	Reign	Succession	Life details
	Louis XVIII "the Desired"		3 May 1814 (Note: Louis XVIII decided not to have a coronation.) – 20 March 1815 (1st time; 10 months and 17 days)	Younger brother of Louis XVI; proclaimed king in June 1795. Had his dynasty restored to the throne with the help of other European royal houses, which had dethroned Napoleon	17 November 1755 – 16 September 1824 (aged 68) Fled France on 21 June 1791, during the Flight to Varennes, and again in March 1815, after the return of Napoleon

== House of Bonaparte, Hundred Days (1815) ==
Portrait	Name	Arms	Reign	Succession	Life details
	Napoleon I		20 March – 22 June 1815 (94 days)	Restored as Emperor of the French by the French Army following his escape from the island of Elba	15 August 1769 – 5 May 1821 (aged 51) Abdicated in favour of his son following his defeat at the Battle of Waterloo. Exiled to the island of Saint Helena, where he later died of a stomach illness
	Napoleon II (claimant)		22 June – 7 July 1815 (15 days; disputed)	Son of Napoleon I; titular emperor after his father's abdication	20 March 1811 – 22 July 1832 (aged 21) Unrecognized by the Coalition; remained his entire "reign" hidden in Austria, with his mother Duchess Marie Louise.

== House of Bourbon, Second Restoration (1815–1830) ==
Portrait	Name	Arms	Reign	Succession	Life details
	Louis XVIII "the Desired"		8 July 1815 – 16 September 1824 (9 years, 2 months and 8 days)	Younger brother of Louis XVI; restored to the throne.	17 November 1755 – 16 September 1824 (aged 68) Attempted to rule under a constitutional monarchy. Last French monarch to die while still reigning
	Charles X		16 September 1824 (Note: Charles X was crowned on 29 May 1825, an unsuccessful attempt to revive the old monarchical traditions.)– 2 August 1830 (5 years, 10 months and 17 days)	Younger brother of Louis XVI and Louis XVIII	9 October 1757 – 6 November 1836 (aged 79) Leader of the Ultra-royalists; attempted to return to the Ancien Régime. Abdicated in favour of his grandson Henry after the July Revolution.
	Louis XIX (claimant)		2 August 1830 (20 minutes; heavily disputed)	Son of Charles X	6 August 1775 – 3 June 1844 (aged 68) Allegedly king for 20 minutes; (Note: Although claimed as the shortest reigning monarch by the Guinness World Records, this claim appears to be unsustained. The exact circumstances of his "abdication" are unknown, as it was announced in a document signed by both Charles X and Louis, who is only called Dauphin. He is said to have been "king" between his father's signature and his own, as he (allegedly) initially refused to sign the document.) later legitimist pretender to the throne.
	Henry V (claimant)		2–9 August 1830 (7 days; disputed)	Grandson of Charles X	29 September 1820 – 24 August 1883 (aged 62) Later legitimist pretender to the throne. Died in exile several years later

== House of Bourbon-Orléans, July Monarchy (1830–1848) ==
The Bourbon Restoration came to an end with the July Revolution of 1830, which deposed Charles X and replaced him with Louis Philippe I, a distant cousin with more liberal politics. Charles X's son Louis signed a document renouncing his own right to the throne only after a 20-minute argument with his father. Because he was never crowned he is disputed as a genuine king of France. Louis's nephew Henry was likewise considered by some to be Henry V, but the new regime did not recognise his claim and he never ruled.

Charles X named Louis Philippe as Lieutenant général du royaume, a regent to the young Henry V, and charged him to announce his desire to have his grandson succeed him to the Chamber of Deputies, the lower house of the French Parliament at the time, the French equivalent at the time of the UK House of Commons. Louis Philippe did not do this, in order to increase his own chances of succession. As a consequence, and because the French parliamentarians were aware of his liberal policies and of his popularity at the time with the French population, they proclaimed Louis Philippe as the new French king, displacing the senior branch of the House of Bourbon.

Portrait	Name	Arms	Reign	Succession	Life details
	Louis Philippe I "the Citizen King"		9 August 1830 (Note: Louis Philippe I decided not to have a coronation.)– 24 February 1848 (17 years, 6 months and 15 days)	Sixth-generation descendant of Louis XIII and distant cousin of Louis XVIII; proclaimed king by the Chamber of Deputies after the abdication of Charles X during the July Revolution	6 October 1773 – 26 August 1850 (aged 76) Styled as King of the French. Formally deposed following the proclamation of the Second Republic. Abdicated in favour of his grandson
	Louis Philippe II (claimant)		24–26 February 1848 (2 days; disputed)	Grandson of Louis-Philippe I	24 August 1838 – 8 September 1894 (aged 56) Chosen by Louis Philippe I to be his successor; the National Assembly refused to recognize him as king and proclaimed the Second Republic. Later Orléanist pretender to the throne.

== Second Republic (1848–1852) ==
=== President of the Provisional Government of the Republic ===
Political parties

Moderate Republicans

Portrait	Name (Birth–Death)	Term of office		Time in office	Political party
	Jacques-Charles Dupont de l'Eure (1767–1855)	26 February 1848	9 May 1848	73 days	Moderate Republicans
	Jacques-Charles Dupont de l'Eure (1767–1855)	1848			Moderate Republicans
	Jacques-Charles Dupont de l'Eure (1767–1855)	Appointed President of the Provisional Government by the National Assembly, during the February Revolution. Resigned in May 1848, making way for the Executive Commission.			

=== President of the Executive Commission ===
Political parties

Moderate Republicans

Portrait	Name (Birth–Death)	Term of office		Time in office	Political party
	François Arago (1786–1853)	9 May 1848	24 June 1848	46 days	Moderate Republicans
	François Arago (1786–1853)	1848			Moderate Republicans
	François Arago (1786–1853)	The Executive Commission was appointed by the National Assembly, with François Arago acting as President of the Commission, and other members including Alphonse de Lamartine, Louis-Antoine Garnier-Pagès, Alexandre Auguste Ledru-Rollin and Pierre Marie de Saint-Georges, who acted jointly as head of state. The Commission was removed from power by the National Assembly, during the June Days uprising, and replaced by an executive power under Louis-Eugène Cavaignac.			

=== Chief of the Executive Power ===
Political parties

Moderate Republicans

Portrait	Name (Birth–Death)	Term of office		Time in office	Political party
	Louis-Eugène Cavaignac (1802–1857)	28 June 1848	20 December 1848	175 days	Moderate Republicans
	Louis-Eugène Cavaignac (1802–1857)	1848			Moderate Republicans
	Louis-Eugène Cavaignac (1802–1857)	Granted dictatorial powers by the National Assembly, during the June Days uprising. Following his suppression of the uprising, Cavaignac was appointed Chief of the Executive Power by the National Assembly. He ran in the 1848 French presidential election, but lost to Louis-Napoléon Bonaparte, who was elected the first President of the French Republic.			

=== President of the Republic ===
Political parties

Bonapartist

Nº	Portrait	Name (Birth–Death)	Term of office; Electoral mandates		Time in office	Political party
1		Louis-Napoléon Bonaparte (1808–1873)	20 December 1848	2 December 1852	3 years, 348 days	Bonapartist
1		Louis-Napoléon Bonaparte (1808–1873)	1848			Bonapartist
1		Louis-Napoléon Bonaparte (1808–1873)	Nephew of Napoléon I. Elected first President of the French Republic in the 1848 election against Louis-Eugène Cavaignac. He provoked the coup of 1851 and proclaimed himself Emperor in 1852. Henri Georges Boulay de la Meurthe, Louis-Napoléon Bonaparte's vice president, was the sole person to hold that office.			

Louis-Napoléon Bonaparte proclaimed himself Emperor of the French in 1852, reigning as Emperor Napoleon III 1852–1870 (Second French Empire).

== House of Bonaparte, Second Empire (1852–1870) ==
The French Second Republic lasted from 1848 to 1852, when its president, Charles-Louis-Napoléon Bonaparte, was declared Emperor of the French under the regnal name of Napoleon III. He would later be overthrown during the events of the Franco-Prussian War, becoming the last monarch to rule France.

Portrait	Name	Arms	Reign	Succession	Life details
	Napoleon III		2 December 1852 (Note: A coronation ceremony for Napoleon III was planned, but never executed.)– 4 September 1870 (17 years, 9 months and 2 days)	Nephew of Napoleon I; elected as President of the French Republic in 1848, made himself Emperor of the French after 1851 coup d'état	20 April 1808 – 9 January 1873 (aged 64) Captured by the German army on 2 September 1870; deposed in absentia following the proclamation of the Third Republic.

== Third Republic (1870–1940) ==
=== President of the Government of National Defense ===
Political parties

Monarchist

Nº	Portrait	Name (Birth–Death)	Term of office		Time in office	Political party
—		Louis-Jules Trochu (1815–1896)	14 September 1870	13 February 1871	152 days	Moderate Monarchist (Orléanist)
—		Louis-Jules Trochu (1815–1896)	Following the capture of Napoleon III at the Battle of Sedan, the National Assembly proclaimed the establishment of a Government of National Defense, with Louis Jules Trochu as its President. He rallied the French defenses during the Siege of Paris, but the Government was defeated by the nascent German Empire.			

=== Chief of the Executive Power ===
Political parties

Independent

Nº	Portrait	Name (Birth–Death)	Term of office		Time in office	Political party
—		Adolphe Thiers (1797–1877)	17 February 1871	30 August 1871	194 days	Moderate Monarchist (Orléanist); Opportunist Republican
—		Adolphe Thiers (1797–1877)	Elected Chief of the Executive Power by the National Assembly, following the Siege of Paris, and established a government with a republican majority. After fighting to re-establish state control over the Paris Commune and securing the withdrawal of the German Army from France, he was elected President of the Republic by the National Assembly.			

=== Presidents of the Republic ===
Political parties

Monarchist
Moderate Republican
Democratic Republican Alliance; Democratic Republican Party; Social and Republican Democratic Party; Democratic Alliance
Radical-Socialist and Radical Republican Party
Independent

Nº	Portrait	Name (Birth–Death)	Term of office		Time in office	Political party
2		Adolphe Thiers (1797–1877)	31 August 1871	24 May 1873	1 year, 266 days	Moderate Monarchist (Orléanist); Opportunist Republican
2		Adolphe Thiers (1797–1877)	Initially a moderate monarchist, named President of France following the adoption of the Rivet law, establishing provisional republican institutions. He became a supporter of the Third Republic during his term. He resigned in the face of hostility from the National Assembly, largely in favour of a return to the monarchy.			
3		Patrice de MacMahon (1808–1893)	24 May 1873	30 January 1879	5 years, 251 days	Monarchist (Legitimist)
3		Patrice de MacMahon (1808–1893)	A Marshal of France, he was the only monarchist (and only Duke) to serve as President of the Third Republic. He resigned shortly after the republican victory in the January 1879 legislative election, following a previous republican victory in 1877, after his decision to dissolve the Chamber of Deputies. During his term, the Constitutional Laws of 1875 that served as the Constitution of the Third Republic were passed; he therefore became the first President under the constitutional settlement that would last until 1940.			
The Government of Jules Armand Dufaure deputised during the interim (30 January 1879).
4		Jules Grévy (1807–1891)	30 January 1879	2 December 1887	8 years, 306 days	Opportunist Republican
4		Jules Grévy (1807–1891)	The first President of France to complete a full term, he was easily reelected in December 1885. He was nonetheless forced to resign, following an honours scandal in which his son-in-law was implicated.			
The Government of Maurice Rouvier deputised during the interim (2–3 December 1887).
5		Sadi Carnot (1837–1894)	3 December 1887	25 June 1894	6 years, 205 days	Opportunist Republican
5		Sadi Carnot (1837–1894)	His term was marked by Boulangist unrest and the Panama scandals, as well as by diplomacy with Russia. Assassinated (stabbed) by Sante Geronimo Caserio a few months before the end of his term, he is interred at the Panthéon.			
The Government of Charles Dupuy deputised during the interim (25–27 June 1894).
6		Jean Casimir-Perier (1847–1907)	27 June 1894	16 January 1895	205 days	Opportunist Republican
6		Jean Casimir-Perier (1847–1907)	Casimir-Perier's was the shortest presidential term: he resigned after six months and 20 days.			
The Government of Charles Dupuy deputised during the interim (16–17 January 1895).
7		Félix Faure (1841–1899)	17 January 1895	16 February 1899	4 years, 30 days	Opportunist Republican; Progressive Republican
7		Félix Faure (1841–1899)	Pursued colonial expansion and ties with Russia. President during the Dreyfus affair. Four years into his term, he died of apoplexy at the Élysée.			
The Government of Charles Dupuy deputised during the interim (16–18 February 1899).
8		Émile Loubet (1838–1929)	18 February 1899	18 February 1906	7 years, 0 days	Democratic Republican Alliance
8		Émile Loubet (1838–1929)	During his seven-year term, the 1905 law on the Separation of the Churches and the State was adopted. He did not seek reelection at the end of his term.			
9		Armand Fallières (1841–1931)	18 February 1906	18 February 1913	7 years, 0 days	Democratic Republican Alliance; then Democratic Republican Party
9		Armand Fallières (1841–1931)	President during the Agadir Crisis, when French troops first occupied Morocco. He was a party to the Triple Entente, which he strengthened by diplomacy. Like his predecessor, he did not seek reelection.			
10		Raymond Poincaré (1860–1934)	18 February 1913	18 February 1920	7 years, 0 days	Democratic Republican Party; then Democratic Republican Alliance
10		Raymond Poincaré (1860–1934)	President during World War I. He subsequently served as Prime Minister, 1922–1924 and 1926–1929.			
11		Paul Deschanel (1855–1922)	18 February 1920	21 September 1920	247 days	Democratic Republican Alliance; then Democratic Republican and Social Party
11		Paul Deschanel (1855–1922)	An intellectual elected to the Académie Française, he overcame the popular Georges Clemenceau, to general surprise, in the January 1920 election. He resigned after eight months due to health problems.			
The Government of Alexandre Millerand deputised during the interim (21–23 September 1920).
12		Alexandre Millerand (1859–1943)	23 September 1920	11 June 1924	3 years, 262 days	Independent
12		Alexandre Millerand (1859–1943)	An "Independent Socialist" increasingly drawn to the right, he resigned after four years following the victory of the Cartel des Gauches in the 1924 legislative election.			
The Government of Frédéric François-Marsal deputised during the interim (11–13 June 1924).
13		Gaston Doumergue (1863–1937)	13 June 1924	13 June 1931	7 years, 0 days	Radical-Socialist and Radical Republican Party
13		Gaston Doumergue (1863–1937)	The first Protestant President, he took a firm political stance against Germany and its resurgent nationalism. His seven-year term was marked by ministerial discontinuity.			
14		Paul Doumer (1857–1932)	13 June 1931	7 May 1932	329 days	Independent
14		Paul Doumer (1857–1932)	Elected in the second round of the 1931 election, having defeated Aristide Briand. Assassinated (shot) by the mentally unstable Paul Gorguloff.			
The Government of André Tardieu deputised during the interim (7–10 May 1932).
15		Albert Lebrun (1871–1950)	10 May 1932	11 July 1940 (de facto)	8 years, 32 days	Democratic Alliance
15		Albert Lebrun (1871–1950)	Reelected in 1939, his second term was interrupted by the rise to power of Marshal Philippe Pétain.			

The office of President of the French Republic did not exist from 1940 until 1947.

== French State (1940–1944) ==
=== Head of State ===
Nº	Portrait	Name (Birth–Death)	Term of office		Time in office	Political party
—		Philippe Pétain (1856–1951)	11 July 1940	19 August 1944	4 years, 39 days	
—		Philippe Pétain (1856–1951)	1940			
—		Philippe Pétain (1856–1951)	Following the fall of France and the signing of an armistice with Nazi Germany, Pétain assumed dictatorial powers and established a collaborationist government. During the liberation of France, Pétain's government fled to the Sigmaringen enclave, where they awaited the end of the war.			

== Provisional Government of the French Republic (1944–1946) ==
=== Chairmen of the Provisional Government ===
Political parties

Independent
Socialist (SFIO)
Centre-right (MRP)

Nº	Portrait	Name (Birth–Death)	Term of office		Time in office	Political party
—		Charles de Gaulle (1890–1970)	3 June 1944	26 January 1946	1 year, 237 days	Independent
—		Charles de Gaulle (1890–1970)	1944			Independent
—		Charles de Gaulle (1890–1970)	Following the Liberation of France, the Committee of National Liberation evolved into a Provisional Government, with de Gaulle as its chairman. He resigned abruptly in January 1946, after a failed attempt to centralise executive power.			
—		Félix Gouin (1884–1977)	26 January 1946	24 June 1946	149 days	French Section of the Workers International
—		Félix Gouin (1884–1977)	1945			French Section of the Workers International
—		Félix Gouin (1884–1977)	Promoted from President of the National Assembly to Chairman of the Provisional Government after de Gaulle's resignation.			
—		Georges Bidault (1899–1983)	24 June 1946	28 November 1946	157 days	Popular Republican Movement
—		Georges Bidault (1899–1983)	1946			Popular Republican Movement
—		Georges Bidault (1899–1983)	Elected as Chairman of the Provisional Government in June 1946, oversaw the passage of the French Constitution of 27 October 1946, then defeated in the subsequent election of November 1946.			
—		Vincent Auriol (1884–1966)	28 November 1946	16 December 1946	18 days	French Section of the Workers' International
—		Vincent Auriol (1884–1966)	1946			French Section of the Workers' International
—		Vincent Auriol (1884–1966)	Elected as Chairman of the Provisional Government in November 1946, overseeing an interim parliamentary government before his accession to President of France.			
—		Léon Blum (1872–1950)	16 December 1946	16 January 1947	31 days	French Section of the Workers' International
—		Léon Blum (1872–1950)	1946			French Section of the Workers' International
—		Léon Blum (1872–1950)	Oversaw the final interim government before the accession of Vincent Auriol to President.			

== Fourth Republic (1946–1958) ==
=== Presidents ===
Political parties

Socialist (SFIO)
Centre-right (CNIP)

Nº	Portrait	Name (Birth–Death)	Term of office; Electoral mandates		Time in office	Political party
16		Vincent Auriol (1884–1966)	16 January 1947	16 January 1954	7 years, 0 days	French Section of the Workers' International
16		Vincent Auriol (1884–1966)	1947			French Section of the Workers' International
16		Vincent Auriol (1884–1966)	First left-wing President of the Republic and first president of the Fourth Republic; his term was marked by the Monnet Plan and the First Indochina War.			
17		René Coty (1882–1962)	16 January 1954	8 January 1959	4 years, 357 days	National Centre of Independents and Peasants
17		René Coty (1882–1962)	1953			National Centre of Independents and Peasants
17		René Coty (1882–1962)	Presidency marked by the Suez Crisis and the Algerian War; appealed to Charles de Gaulle to resolve the May 1958 crisis. Following the promulgation of the Fifth Republic, he resigned after five years as president, giving way to de Gaulle.			

== Fifth Republic (1958–present) ==
=== Presidents ===
Political parties

Centre-left (PS) (2)
Centrist (RE) (1)
Centre-right (CD; RI; PR; UDF) (1)
Gaullist (UNR; UDR) (2)
Neo-Gaullist (RPR; UMP; LR) (2)

Nº	Portrait	Name (Birth–Death)	Term of office; Electoral mandates		Time in office	Political party
18		Charles de Gaulle (1890–1970)	8 January 1959	28 April 1969	10 years, 110 days	Union for the New Republic (renamed Union of Democrats for the Fifth Republic in 1967)
18		Charles de Gaulle (1890–1970)	1958, 1965			Union for the New Republic (renamed Union of Democrats for the Fifth Republic in 1967)
18		Charles de Gaulle (1890–1970)	Leader of the Free French Forces, 1940–1944. President of the Provisional Government, 1944–1946. Appointed President of the Council by René Coty in May 1958, to resolve the crisis of the Algerian War. Supported by referendum, he adopted a new Constitution of France, thus founding the Fifth Republic. Easily elected to the presidency in the 1958 election by electoral college, he took office the following month; having modified the presidential election procedure in the 1962 referendum, he was reelected by universal suffrage in the 1965 election. Launched the Force de dissuasion in 1961. He signed the Élysée Treaty in 1963, building Franco-German cooperation, a key to European integration. In 1966, he withdrew France from NATO integrated military command and had American military personnel stationed on French soil sent home. Supported Quebec sovereignty. Faced the May 68 civil unrest. Resigned following the failure of the 1969 referendum on regionalisation.			
—		Alain Poher; Acting (1909–1996)	28 April 1969	20 June 1969	53 days	Democratic Centre
—		Alain Poher; Acting (1909–1996)	Interim President of France, as President of the Senate. Stood in the 1969 election but was defeated in the second round by Georges Pompidou.			
19		Georges Pompidou (1911–1974)	20 June 1969	2 April 1974	4 years, 286 days	Union of Democrats for the Republic
19		Georges Pompidou (1911–1974)	1969			Union of Democrats for the Republic
19		Georges Pompidou (1911–1974)	Prime Minister under Charles de Gaulle, 1962–1968. Elected to the presidency in the 1969 election against centrist Alain Poher. Favoured European integration. Supported economic modernisation and industrialisation, notably through the launch of the Ariane rocket programme and the TGV high-speed rail project. Faced the 1973 oil crisis. Died in office of Waldenström macroglobulinemia, two years before the end of his term.			
—		Alain Poher; Acting (1909–1996)	2 April 1974	27 May 1974	55 days	Democratic Centre
—		Alain Poher; Acting (1909–1996)	Interim President of France again, as President of the Senate. Did not stand in the 1974 election.			
20		Valéry Giscard d'Estaing (1926–2020)	27 May 1974	21 May 1981	6 years, 359 days	Independent Republicans (renamed Republican Party in 1977) (within the Union for French Democracy from 1978)
20		Valéry Giscard d'Estaing (1926–2020)	1974			Independent Republicans (renamed Republican Party in 1977) (within the Union for French Democracy from 1978)
20		Valéry Giscard d'Estaing (1926–2020)	Founder of the Independent Republicans and later the Union for French Democracy in his efforts to unify the centre-right, he served in several Gaullist governments. Narrowly elected in the 1974 election, he instigated numerous reforms, including the lowering of the age of civil majority from 21 to 18 and legalisation of abortion. Hosted the 1st G6 summit in Rambouillet in 1975. He soon faced a global economic crisis and rising unemployment. Although the polls initially gave him a lead, he was defeated in the 1981 election by François Mitterrand, partly due to disunion within the right. Remained active in politics following his term.			
21		François Mitterrand (1916–1996)	21 May 1981	17 May 1995	13 years, 361 days	Socialist Party
21		François Mitterrand (1916–1996)	1981, 1988			Socialist Party
21		François Mitterrand (1916–1996)	Candidate of a united left-wing ticket in the 1965 election, he founded the Socialist Party in 1971. Having narrowly lost in 1974, he was finally elected in 1981. Mitterrand supervised a series of Great Works, the best known of which is the Louvre Pyramid. He instigated the abolition of the death penalty. After the right-wing victory in the 1986 legislative election, he named Jacques Chirac as Prime Minister, thus beginning the first cohabitation. Reelected in the 1988 election against Chirac, he was again forced to cohabit with Édouard Balladur following the 1993 legislative election. He retired in 1995 after the conclusion of his second term. He was the first left-wing President of the Fifth Republic; his presidential tenure was the longest of any French Republic.			
22		Jacques Chirac (1932–2019)	17 May 1995	16 May 2007	11 years, 364 days	Rally for the Republic (until 2002); Union for a Popular Movement (from 2002)
22		Jacques Chirac (1932–2019)	1995, 2002			Rally for the Republic (until 2002); Union for a Popular Movement (from 2002)
22		Jacques Chirac (1932–2019)	Prime Minister, 1974–1976; upon resignation, founded the Rally for the Republic. Eliminated in the first round of the 1981 election, he again served as Prime Minister, 1986–1988. Defeated in the 1988 election, he was elected in 1995. He engaged in social reforms to counter the "social rift"; ended conscription in 1997; reaffirmed secularity in schools. He dissolved the National Assembly but the left-wing victory in the 1997 legislative election forced him to name Lionel Jospin Prime Minister for a five-year cohabitation. Presidential terms reduced from seven to five years after approval by referendum. In 2002, he was easily reelected against far-right candidate Jean-Marie Le Pen. Sent troops to Afghanistan, but opposed the Iraq War. Declined to seek a third term in 2007 and retired from political life.			
23		Nicolas Sarkozy (b. 1955)	16 May 2007	15 May 2012	4 years, 365 days	Union for a Popular Movement
23		Nicolas Sarkozy (b. 1955)	2007			Union for a Popular Movement
23		Nicolas Sarkozy (b. 1955)	Served in government, 1993–1995 and 2002–2007. Easily elected to the leadership of the Union for a Popular Movement in 2004. Elected to the presidency in 2007, defeating Socialist Ségolène Royal. Introduced a new fiscal package and other laws to counter illegal immigration and recidivism; banned face covering in public spaces. President of the Council of the EU in 2008, he defended the Treaty of Lisbon and mediated in the Russo-Georgian War; launched the Union for the Mediterranean; reintroduced France to NATO integrated military command; hosted the G8 and G20 in 2011. At national level, he had to deal with the consequences of the Great Recession. Following the 2008 constitutional reform, which introduced term limits for presidents, he became the first president since Louis-Napoléon Bonaparte to address the Versailles Congress in 2009. Introduced education and pension reforms. Sent troops to Libya (Operation Harmattan) in 2011. Narrowly defeated in the runoff of the 2012 election.			
24		François Hollande (b. 1954)	15 May 2012	14 May 2017	4 years, 364 days	Socialist Party
24		François Hollande (b. 1954)	2012			Socialist Party
24		François Hollande (b. 1954)	Served as First Secretary of the Socialist Party, 1997–2008 and President of the General Council of Corrèze, 2008–2012. Elected in 2012, defeating Nicolas Sarkozy. Legalised same-sex marriage and restricted dual mandates. Militarily intervened in Mali (Operation Serval), in the Central African Republic (Operation Sangaris) and in Iraq and Syria (Operation Chammal). Paris suffered Islamic terrorist attacks in January 2015 and November 2015, as well as Nice in July 2016. Hosted the 2015 UN Climate Change Conference. Did not seek reelection in the 2017 election, for which polls suggested his defeat in the first round.			
25		Emmanuel Macron (b. 1977)	14 May 2017	Incumbent (Note: Term expires on 13 May 2027)	9 years, 168 days	La République En Marche! (renamed Renaissance in 2022)
25		Emmanuel Macron (b. 1977)	2017, 2022			La République En Marche! (renamed Renaissance in 2022)
25		Emmanuel Macron (b. 1977)	Served as Élysée Deputy Secretary-General, 2012–2014 and Minister of Economics, Industry and Digital Affairs, 2014–2016. Ran as a centrist in 2017, easily defeating Marine Le Pen. Youngest president in French history. Encountered massive demonstrations, notably the yellow vests protests, from 2018 over his policy orientations and style of governance. Faced the COVID-19 pandemic. In 2022, he was reelected with a reduced majority against Le Pen, losing the government's ruling majority in the National Assembly. Launched the European Intelligence College and the European Political Community; co-hosted the 2025 AI summit. Called a snap legislative election in 2024 which further reduced his standing in the National Assembly, forcing him to appoint Michel Barnier of The Republicans as Prime Minister.			

== Later pretenders ==
Various pretenders descended from the preceding monarchs have claimed to be the legitimate monarch of France, rejecting the claims of the President of France, and of each other. These groups are:

- Legitimist claimants to the throne of France: descendants of the Bourbons, rejecting all heads of state 1792–1814, 1815, and since 1830. Unionists recognized the Orléanist claimant after 1883.
- Legitimist-Anjou claimants to the throne of France: descendants of Louis XIV, claiming precedence over the House of Orléans by virtue of primogeniture
- Orléanist claimants to the throne of France: descendants of Louis-Phillippe, himself descended from a junior line of the Bourbon dynasty, rejecting all heads of state since 1848.
- Bonapartist claimants to the throne of France: descendants of Napoleon I and his brothers, rejecting all heads of state 1815–48, and since 1870.
- English claimants to the throne of France: Kings of England and later, of Great Britain (renounced by Hanoverian King George III upon union with Ireland)
- Jacobite claimants to the throne of France: senior heirs-general of King Edward III of England and thus his claim to the French throne, also claiming England, Scotland, and Ireland.

== See also ==
- List of French monarchs
- List of presidents of the National Convention
- List of presidents of France
- Ministers of the French National Convention
- Representative on mission
- Full list of members of the Convention per department: List of members of the National Convention by Department (French)
- List of foreign ministers of France
- List of prime ministers of France
- President of France
- British claims to the French throne
- Kings of France family tree
- Style of the French sovereign

== Notes, citations and sources ==
=== Sources ===
- Alcan, Félix (1892). Revue historique (in French). Vol. 40.
- Alderson, Robert. This Bright Era of Happy Revolutions: French Consul. U. of South Carolina Press, 2008. OCLC 192109705
- Anchel, Robert (1911). "Convention, The National" . In Chisholm, Hugh (ed.). Encyclopædia Britannica. Vol. 07 (11th ed.). Cambridge University Press. p. 46.
- Bachrach, Bernard S.; Bachrach, David S.; Leese, Michael (2018). Deeds of the Bishops of Cambrai, Translation and Commentary. Routledge. ISBN 9781317036210.
- Blanc, Louis (1848). France Under Louis Philippe. Translated by Walter Kelly.
- Bodin, Felix (1840). Resumé de l'histoire de France. London: Joseph Rickerby. p. 43.
- Bradford, James C. (2004). International Encyclopedia of Military History. Routledge. ISBN 9781135950347.
- Brownell, Henry (1854). "The Rulers of France". The People's Book of Ancient and Modern History. Dayton & Wentworth.
- Brunel, G. (2007). "Les cisterciens et Charles V". Société de l'histoire de France: 67–92. JSTOR 23408518.
- Castelot, André (1988). Charles X. Librairie Académique Perrin. ISBN 2-262-00545-1.
- Champion, Honoré (1976). Robert Ier et Raoul de Bourgogne. Slatkine. pp. 9–11.
- Cheynet, Pierre-Dominique. France: Members of the Executive Directory: 1792–1793, and 1793–1795. Archontology.org 2013, Accessed 19 February 2015.
- Curry, Anne (1993). The Hundred Years War. Macmillan. ISBN 9781349227112.
- de Wailly, E. (1838). "Liste Chronologique des rois de France". Eléments de paléographie. Vol. 1. Ghent University.
- Doyle, William. The Oxford History of the French Revolution. 2nd edition. Oxford University Press, 2002. OCLC 490913480
- (in French) Dupuy, Roger. La République jacobine. Terreur, guerre et gouvernement révolutionnaire (1792—1794). Paris, Le Seuil, 2005. ISBN 2-02-039818-4
- Dutton, Paul E. (1994). The Politics of Dreaming in the Carolingian Empire. University of Nebraska Press. p. 227. ISBN 9780803216532.
- Encyclopædia Britannica Online
- Furet, François. The French Revolution: 1770–1814. Oxford, Blackwell Publishers Ltd, 1996. OCLC 25094935
- Fleischmann, Hector, Behind the Scenes in the Terror, NY, Brentano's, 1915. OCLC 499613
- (in French) Garnier, Jean-Claude; Jean-Pierre Mohen. Cimetières autour du monde: Un désir d'éternité. Paris, Editions Errance. 2003. OCLC 417420035
- Greer, Donald. The Incidence of the Terror during the French Revolution: A Statistical Interpretation. Cambridge (United States C.A), Harvard University Press, 1951. OCLC 403511
- Havet, Julien (1891). "Les couronnements des rois Hugues et Robert". Revue historique. 45: 290–297. JSTOR 40939391.
- Holoman, D. Kern (2004). The Société Des Concerts Du Conservatoire, 1828–1967. University of California Press. ISBN 9780520236646.
- Humphreys, A.L. (1907). The Kings of France, their Wives and Mistresses. London. ASIN B004Z0M2K2. OCLC 1047511953.
- Jackson, Richard A. (1995). Ordines Coronationis Franciae. University of Pennsylvania Press. ISBN 9781512821604. JSTOR j.ctt1kgqwvd.
- Linton, Marisa. Choosing Terror: Virtue, Friendship, and Authenticity in the French Revolution Oxford U.P., 2013. OCLC 829055558
- Knecht, Robert (2007). The Valois: Kings of France. A&C Black. ISBN 9781852855222.
- Knecht, Robert (2016). Hero or Tyrant? Henry III, King of France. Routledge. ISBN 9781317122142.
- McCarty, L. P. (1890). "France". The Annual Statistician and Economist. Harvard University: Pacific Press Publishing Company. pp. 327–332.
- McConville, Julia (2018). "Clovis III". In Nicholson, Oliver (ed.). The Oxford Dictionary of Late Antiquity. Oxford University Press.
- McKitterick, Rosamond (1995). The New Cambridge Medieval History. Vol. 2. Cambridge University Press. p. 137. ISBN 9780521362924.
- MacLean, Simon (2003). Charles the Fat and the End of the Carolingian Empire. Cambridge University Press. ISBN 9781139440295.
- Neeley, Sylvia. A Concise History of the French Revolution, Lanham, Rowman & Littlefield, 2008. OCLC 156874791
- Peignot, Gabriel (1819). Abrégé de l'histoire de France (in French). Harvard University.
- Popkin, Jeremy D. A Short History of the French Revolution. 5th ed. Upper Saddle River, Pearson, 2009. OCLC 36739547
- Smitha, Frank E. Macrohistory: Fear, Overreaction and War (1792–93). 2009–2015 version. Accessed 21 April 2015.
- Thoison, E. (1888). "Table Chronologique". Les séjours des rois de France: 481–1789. Société historique et archéologique du Gâtinais. Bibliothèque nationale de France.
- Thompson, J.M. The French Revolution. Oxford, Basil Blackwell, 1959. OCLC 1052771
- Wellman, Kathleen (2013). Queens and Mistresses of Renaissance France. Yale University Press. ISBN 9780300178852.
