= Letourneur =

Letourneur is a French surname. Notable people with the surname include:

- Étienne-François Letourneur (1751–1817), French lawyer, soldier, and politician
- François-Joseph Alexandre Letourneur (1769–1843), French soldier
- Pierre Le Tourneur (1736–1788), French author and translator
- René Letourneur (1898–1990), sculptor
