= Jean-Antoine Louis du Bas-Rhin =

Municipal functionary (1742–1796)

46th President of the National Convention
- In office 5–19 July 1794
- Preceded by: Élie Lacoste
- Succeeded by: Jean-Marie Collot d'Herbois

Personal details
- Born: 10 March 1742 Bar-le-Duc, Meuse, Kingdom of France
- Died: 19 August 1796 (aged 32) Paris, French First Republic
- Party: The Mountain
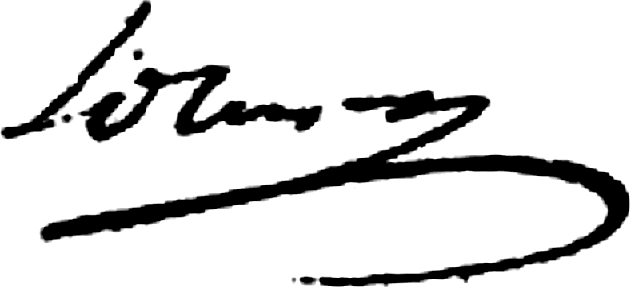
- Signature

Jean-Antoine Louis known as "Louis du Bas-Rhin" (10 March 1742 in Bar-le-Duc – 1796), was a municipal functionary from Strasbourg.

He was employed under the Intendant of Alsace when the French Revolution began. He rapidly adopted the new ideas.

== During the Revolution ==
During the National Assembly, Louis served as an administrator and member of the Directory of the Département of Bas-Rhin in 1791. Elected deputy to the Convention for the département of Bas-Rhin (1792, he voted for the death of Louis XVI. Elected to Committee of General Security in October 1793. With Jean-Adam Pflieger, sent as Representative on a Mission to Alsace from March to July 1793. He served as President of the Convention from 5 July 1794 to 19 July 1794. It was the last complete term of office for a President before the end of the French Terror.

With the fall of Maximilien Robespierre 9 Thermidor he was released from his duties on the Committee of General Security. In his tenure on the committee he gained a reputation as one of the more accommodating, sympathetic members.

== Under the Directory ==
Elected deputy to Council of Five Hundred, he died before he could attend a session.

== Sources ==
- Révolution française de Jules Michelet
