= Marc-Guillaume Alexis Vadier =

French politician (1736–1828)

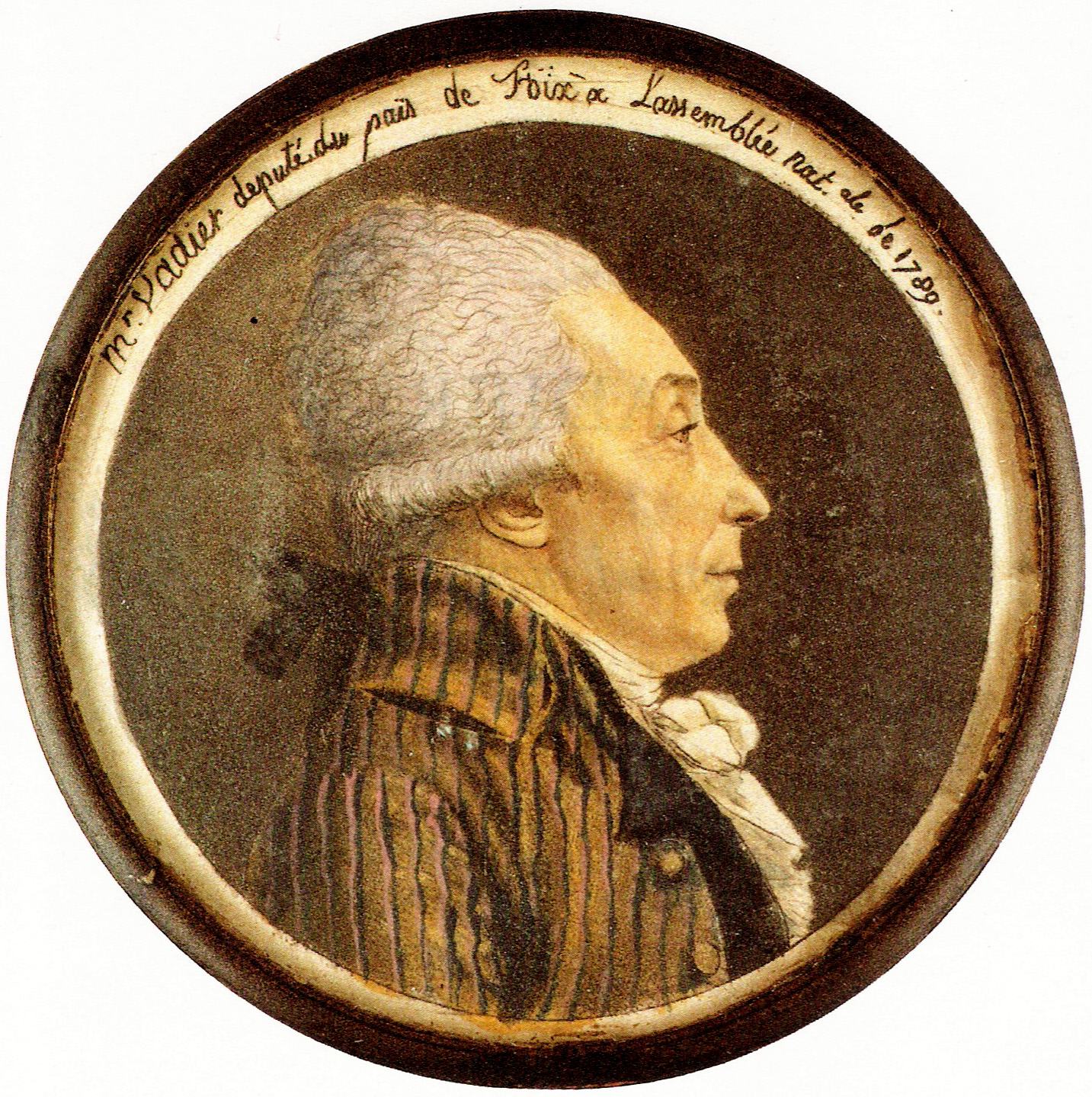
- Marc-Guillaume Alexis Vadier by Edmé Quenedey des Ricets, 1789

35th President of the National Convention
- In office 20 January 1794 – 4 February 1794
- Preceded by: Jacques-Louis David
- Succeeded by: Joseph-Nicolas Barbeau du Barran

Personal details
- Born: 17 July 1736 Pamiers, County of Foix, Kingdom of France
- Died: 14 December 1828 (aged 92) Brussels, United Kingdom of the Netherlands
- Party: The Mountain
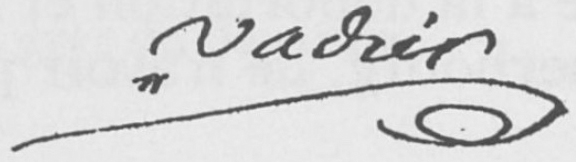
- Signature
- Nickname: The Great Inquisitor

Marc-Guillaume Alexis Vadier (17 July 1736 – 14 December 1828) was a major French politician of the French Revolution. He is sometimes called the "Great Inquisitor", for his active participation in the Reign of Terror.

He is primarily known for having created the département of Ariège and mostly for having firmly led the Committee of General Security, thus being one of the key figures of the Reign of Terror and the "dean of its political police." Vadier also had an influential role on 9 Thermidor, during the fall of Robespierre, with whom he had a long-standing rivalry.

He managed to avoid reprisals for his role during the Terror, which targeted him following Robespierre's fall, and survived the Revolution, participating in relative anonymity during the First Empire period. He was later exiled under the law targeting regicides during Louis XVIII's reign.

Like Robespierre, Barère, or Billaud-Varenne, his exact role during the Terror is still debated by historians. However, it is acknowledged that a significant part of the repressive measures of the Terror and the executions can be attributed to the Committee of General Security, which he led, and that he participated in organizing the Great Terror by increasing the number of executions alongside Fouché, notably to accuse Robespierre.

== Biography ==
=== Early career ===
Son of a wealthy family in Pamiers, in the County of Foix (now Ariège), he served in the army of King Louis XV, taking part in the Seven Years' War and the Battle of Rossbach on 5 November 1757. Upon his return to France in 1758, Vadier acquired large tracts of land in Pamiers and in 1770 purchased the office of conseiller (magistrate), which brought him into conflict with many of the local aristocracy and affluent bourgeoisie. Elected as deputy to the Third Estate in the Estates-General of France for the County of Foix (in 1789), Vadier took no prominent part in that assembly.

He left his office as representative in the National Constituent Assembly of the Constitutional Monarchy (September 1791), returning to Ariège département, becoming president of the district tribunal in Mirepoix, contributing to the creation of new revolutionary institutions throughout the region. With the overthrow of the monarchy one year later, (10 August 1792), he was elected to the National Convention (3 September), sat among the Montagnards, joined the Jacobin Club, and voted in favor of Louis XVI's execution (sans appel ni sursis – without appeal or delay) on 17 January 1793. An opponent of the Girondists, Vadier opposed the proscription of Jean-Paul Marat, and following the fall of the Girondists travelled to Ariège to actively oppose the Federalist Revolt there. Vadier was an unwavering and fanatical Jacobin, known for his particular violence, often traveling in Ariège with armed men by his side. He also stood out due to his Gascon accent.

=== Reign of Terror ===
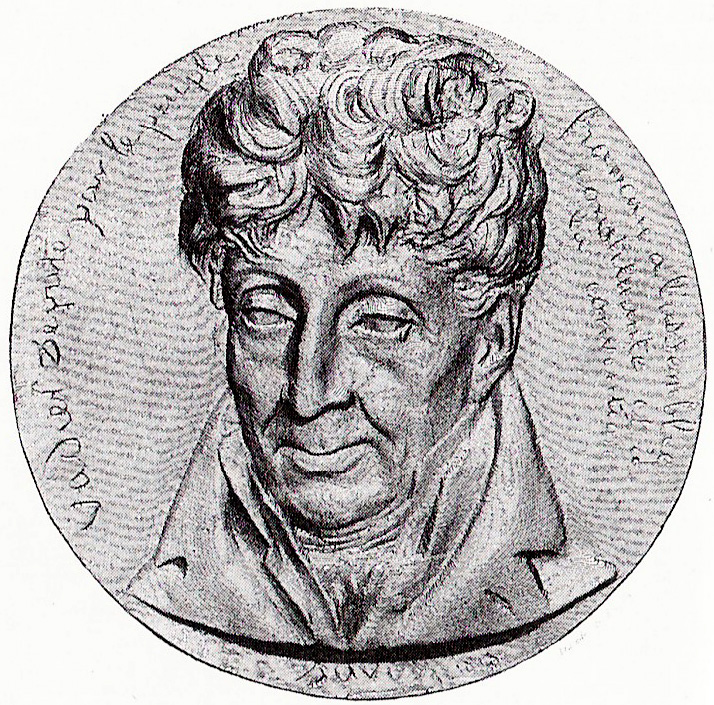
Vadier by David d'Angers

From September 1793 onward, he became the president and dean of the Committee of General Security, the policing and repressive organ of the Terror, earning the title of the "dean of the political police" during the Terror, according to Olivier Blanc. Vadier quickly fell out with Robespierre, particularly due to his militant atheism and the creation of the General Police Bureau by the Committee of Public Safety, while he sought to control repression. Under his leadership, the Committee of General Security became a "ministry of Terror."

In Nivôse Year II (January 1794), along with Amar, he exposed the wrongdoings of Fabre d'Églantine, Chabot, and their associates, including Danton, and initiated the trial targeting the Dantonists. He referred to Danton as a "stuffed turbot" in the course of his attacks. It seems that he and Amar were the main instigators of the trial of the Dantonists. He directly approached Fouquier-Tinville, requesting him to have certain accused individuals guillotined.

Vadier presided over the Convention when the abolition of slavery was voted upon amid cries of "Long live the Republic, long live the Convention, long live the Mountain." He also played a role in setting up the trial of Camille Desmoulins, who had accused him in the Vieux Cordelier, stating about Vadier: "Marat denounced him as the most infamous renegade." He had a connection with Joséphine de Beauharnais, who was one of his acquaintances. She intervened with Vadier to secure the release of one of her close associates, but it bore no fruit, and instead, he suspected her and had her imprisoned. He maintained close ties with Joseph Fouché. He directly intervened with Fouquier-Tinville, requesting him to have certain accused individuals guillotined. Vadier was also responsible for the imprisonment of the Franco-American deputy Thomas Paine. He later defended Paine's incarceration by arguing that Paine was not American but English because he was born in the United Kingdom.

After 22 Prairial Year II (10 June 1794), when public debates were abolished in the Revolutionary Tribunal, he had those he wanted to take revenge on brought to trial. According to the Count de Folmon, he initiated the grand trial of members of the parliament of Toulouse. He was also a significant player in the power struggle between the two government committees, the Committee of Public Safety and the Committee of General Security, each trying to gain the upper hand. During this conflict, he had Robespierre spied on by Taschereau, but Taschereau betrayed him and instead reported his actions to Robespierre.

In Germinal, Year II (April 1794), he took part in the establishment of the Prisoners' Conspiracy, a kind of plot aimed at executing all the prisoners held in Paris. Together with Fouché, he participated in and organized the Great Terror by increasing the number of executions, notably to accuse Robespierre.

On 26 Prairial Year II (14 June 1794), Élie Lacoste presented his report on the alleged Batz conspiracy, which led to the execution of fifty-four individuals. Vadier once again read to the convention the indictment, based on false evidence, against Catherine Théot, ridiculing the Cult of the Supreme Being advocated by Robespierre.

=== Thermidor and after ===
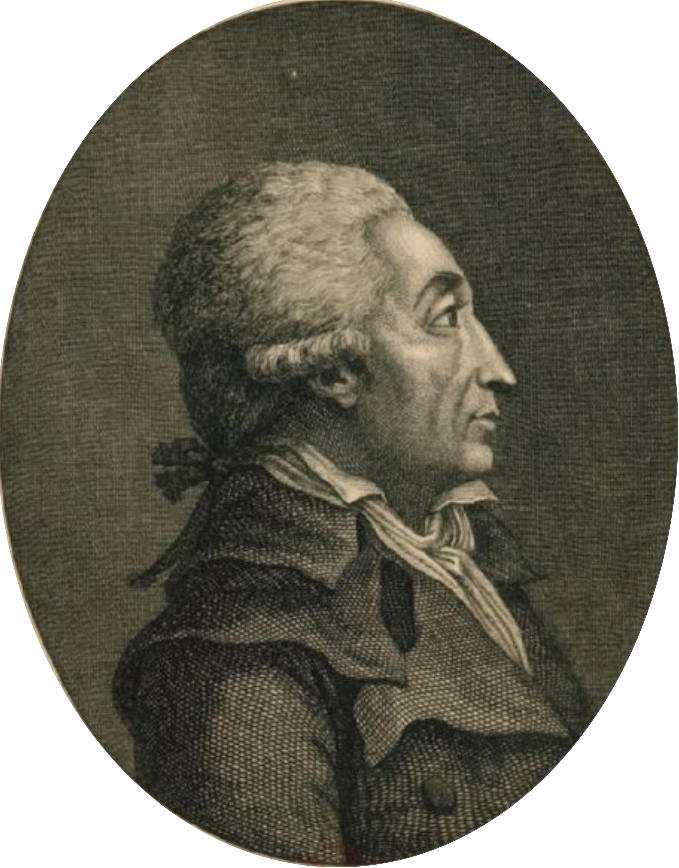
Vadier by François Bonneville (1799)

After being targeted by Robespierre in his final speech as a "wicked man," Vadier played a role in the fall of Robespierre by speaking out against him on the 8th and 9th of Thermidor at the convention. He famously exclaimed, "Catiline is in the Senate!" while pointing at Robespierre. He also criticized Robespierre for his protection of priests. His reasons for doing so were likely a desire to control the state's repressive apparatus and avoid becoming a target of a Robespierre-led purge.

After the death of Robespierre, he voted for the indictment of Carrier, the organizer of the drownings in Nantes. On the 15th of Frimaire, Year III (5 December 1794), an investigation was initiated in the name of the Convention against the "Four" members of the Committee of Year II, including Barère, Collot d'Herbois, Billaud-Varenne, and himself. When the investigation was approved, he took to the podium with a pistol in hand, threatening to commit suicide if the Convention did not do justice to his "sixty years of virtue." He had to be restrained by several deputies. Another day, while he was walking in the street, he was arrested and roughed up by Muscadins, groups of reactionary, royalist, and generally bourgeois young men in the Faubourg Saint-Antoine, but he emerged unharmed.

Following the uprising in Germinal, Year III, he was sentenced to deportation along with the "Four," but he managed to go into hiding until the amnesty was passed upon the separation of the convention.

During the Directory, Vadier lent his support to Babeuf's Conspiracy of the Equals but was acquitted by the High Court of Vendôme. However, he remained imprisoned for that issue on Pelée Island near Cherbourg until the year VIII (1799). He was then released by Cambacérès after a request from his friend Fouché and kept a low profile in Chartres.

He was placed under surveillance during the Consulate and the Empire and was later exiled as a regicide in 1816. He went to live in Belgium.

=== Exile and death ===
He never questioned or challenged his actions during the Terror but did admit to making a mistake by supporting the fall of Robespierre to one of his friends before going into exile. Similarly, towards the end of his life, he stated:

I am ninety-two years old, the strength of my opinions prolongs my days; there is not a single act in my life that I regret, except for having misunderstood Robespierre and mistaking a fellow citizen for a tyrant.

At 92 years old, Marc-Guillaume-Alexis Vadier died on Sunday, 14 December 1828, at 6:00 PM, in the small house he lived in at 1251 Rue des douze apôtres, Brussels.

== Posterity ==
=== History ===
Historians continue to debate the significance of Vadier's actions and his role within the French Revolution, especially during the Reign of Terror. While he was a member of the Thermidorians, it is acknowledged that a significant portion of the repressive measures during the Terror and the executions can be attributed to the Committee of General Security, which he led. Additionally, he increased the number of executions during the period of the Great Terror in an effort to accuse Robespierre.

=== Art ===
==== Literature ====
Vadier is a figure present in the Hugolian imagination; he is mentioned several times by Victor Hugo, notably in his last novel, "Ninety-Three," and in "Literature and Mixed Philosophy," where he stated: "Everything was already in that dark point, January 21, May 31, Thermidor 9, a bloody trilogy; Buzot, who was to devour Louis XVI, Robespierre, who was to devour Buzot, Vadier, who was to devour Robespierre, a sinister trinity." He is represented as a cold man in a piece of Romain Rolland.
