= Committee of General Security =

1792–1795 French Revolutionary body

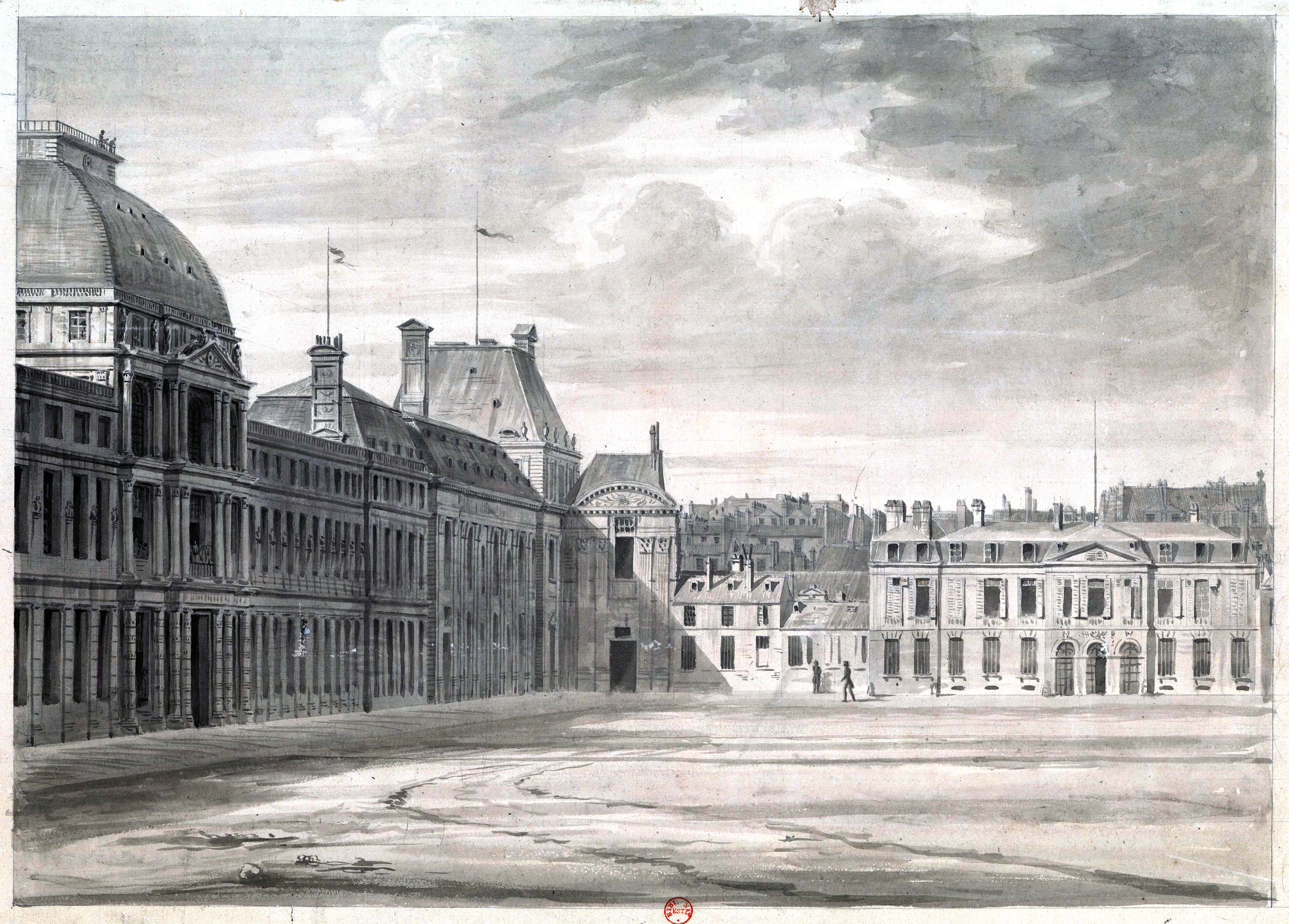
The Committee of General Security was located in Hôtel de Brionne on the right; it gathered on the first floor. (The Tuileries Palace, which housed the convention, is on the left)

The Committee of General Security (French: Comité de sûreté générale) was a parliamentary committee of the French National Convention which acted as police agency during the French Revolution. Established as a committee of the Convention in October 1792, it was designed to protect the Revolutionary Republic from internal enemies. Along with the Committee of Public Safety it oversaw the Reign of Terror. The Committee of General Security supervised the local police committees in charge of investigating reports of treason, and was one of the agencies with authority to refer suspects to the Revolutionary Tribunal for trial and possible execution by guillotine. In 1794 the committee was involved in the arrest and execution of Maximilien Robespierre and several of his political allies on 9 Thermidor. On 4 November 1795, along with the end of the National Convention, the Committee of General Security dissolved.

Among its prominent members, there were Marc-Guillaume Alexis Vadier, Jean-Pierre-André Amar, Jean-Paul Marat or Jacques-Louis David.

== Origins and evolution ==
On 2 October 1792, the National Convention created the Committee of General Security from its predecessors: the Search Committee (Comité des recherches) and the Committee of Surveillance (Comité de Surveillance). The committee was not large and never exceeded 16 members. The committee's main responsibility was the internal security of France and to protect the Republic from both external and internal enemies. One way of ensuring the security of France was through the passport system. Through this system the members of the committee had the knowledge of who was entering France and where they were going. The committee had the authority to decide who was sent to the Revolutionary Tribunal for judgment during the Reign of Terror. Once the evidence was fully considered in an individual case the members of the committee made the decision on the likelihood of the innocence or guilt of the suspect, which determined if that person would be released or sent to the Tribunal.

Throughout the existence of the committee, it contributed to a large number of people being sent to the Revolutionary Tribunal, many of whom ended up at the guillotine. On March 29, 1794, the committee ordered twenty-four former members of the parlements of Paris and Toulouse to be sent to the Tribunal, where they were subsequently executed. Shortly after, another twenty-eight people that were a part of the Farmers-General, were investigated by the committee and sent to the Tribunal for trial. After the trial the men were found guilty and executed.

A proposal of Danton on 13 September 1793 marked a turning point in the composition of the committee: from then on its members were appointed directly by the Committee of Public Safety and were no more than twelve in number. The regulation of 19 October 1793 stated that the committee should sit every day from eight o'clock until eleven o'clock in the evening, later if circumstances required that. The Law of 14 Frimaire (4 December 1793), voted on the report of Billaud-Varenne, restored a degree of equality between the two committees. On 16 April 1794 the Committee of Public Safety received the power to search and to bring the accused before the Revolutionary Tribunal, in the same way as the Committee of General Security. The Committee of General Security and the Committee of Public Safety worked alongside one another. Their responsibilities became overlapping which caused tensions between the two groups. The Law of 22 Prairial year II (10 June 1794) deepened this rivalry as it enabled the two committees to send the accused directly before the Revolutionary Tribunal. The law was introduced to the public without consultation from the Committee of General Security, which, in turn, doubled the number of executions permitted by the Committee of Public Safety. On 22 and 23 July the two committees met in a plenary session. Saint-Just declared in negotiations with Barère to be prepared to make concessions on the subordinate position of the Committee of General Security. Couthon agreed with more cooperation between the two committees. For Robespierre, the Committee of General Security had to remain subordinate to the Committee of Public Safety. Both committees were responsible for suppressing counterrevolution, but sometimes ended up targeting each other.

The tensions grew and contributed to the downfall of Robespierre and many of the Montagnards. Two members of the Committee of General Security, Jean-Pierre-André Amar and Marc-Guillaume Alexis Vadier, participated in the 9 Thermidor coup against Robespierre. At the National Convention, Vadier also used false accusations implementing Catherine Théot in a plot to overthrow the Republic, which was also connected to Robespierre and the Cult of the Supreme Being.

The Committee of General Security had more than 160 employees on the eve of the 9 Thermidor. The Committee of General Security dissolved with the end of the National Convention in November 1795.

== Prominent members ==
The Committee of General Security had a significant number of members over its three-year history from 2 October 1792-November 4, 1795. However, it numbered only twelve at the start of the Reign of Terror.

- Jean-Paul Marat
- Marc-Guillaume Alexis Vadier
- Jacques-Louis David
- Jean-Pierre-André Amar
- Philippe-François-Joseph Le Bas
- Jean-Henri Voulland
- Pierre Joseph Duhem
- Élie Lacoste
- Joseph-Nicolas Barbeau du Barran

== Sources ==
- Le Comité de sûreté générale (1792–1795) par Emilia Cadio
