= Jean-Henri Voulland =

French politician (1751–1801)

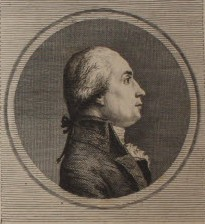
- Jean-Henri Voulland

32nd President of the National Convention
- In office 6 December 1793 – 21 December 1793
- Preceded by: Gilbert Romme
- Succeeded by: Georges Couthon

Personal details
- Born: 11 October 1751 Uzès, Languedoc, Kingdom of France
- Died: 23 February 1801 (aged 49) Paris, France
- Party: The Mountain
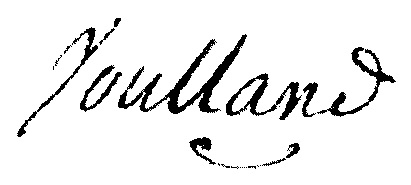
- Signature

Jean-Henri Voulland (11 October 1751, Uzès, Languedoc – 23 February 1801, Paris) was a politician of the French Revolution. Originating from a Protestant family, he originally studied law. One of his offices was that of deputy for Gard in the National Convention, to which he was elected on 5 September 1792. In September 1793 he was elected as a member of the Committee of General Security. He became part of the opposition to Robespierre and the Committee of Public Safety and played an important role in the overthrow of Robespierre on 9 Thermidor (27 July 1794).
