= Jean-Baptiste François Desoria =

French painter (1758–1832)

- Born: 1758; Paris, Kingdom of France
- Died: 1832 (aged 73–74); Cambrai, Kingdom of France

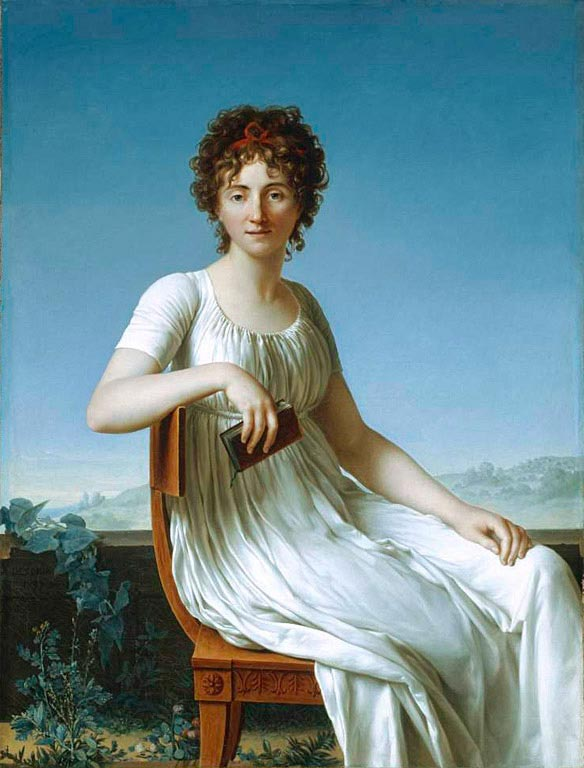
Portrait of Constance Pipelet (1797), Art Institute of Chicago

Jean-Baptiste François Desoria (1758 – 1832) was a French painter.

== Biography ==
He was born in Paris and trained with Jean Bernard Restout. He painted in the neoclassical style and became the teacher of Auguste Dominique Mennessier.

He died in Cambrai, France in 1832.
