= Joseph-Nicolas Barbeau du Barran =

French politician

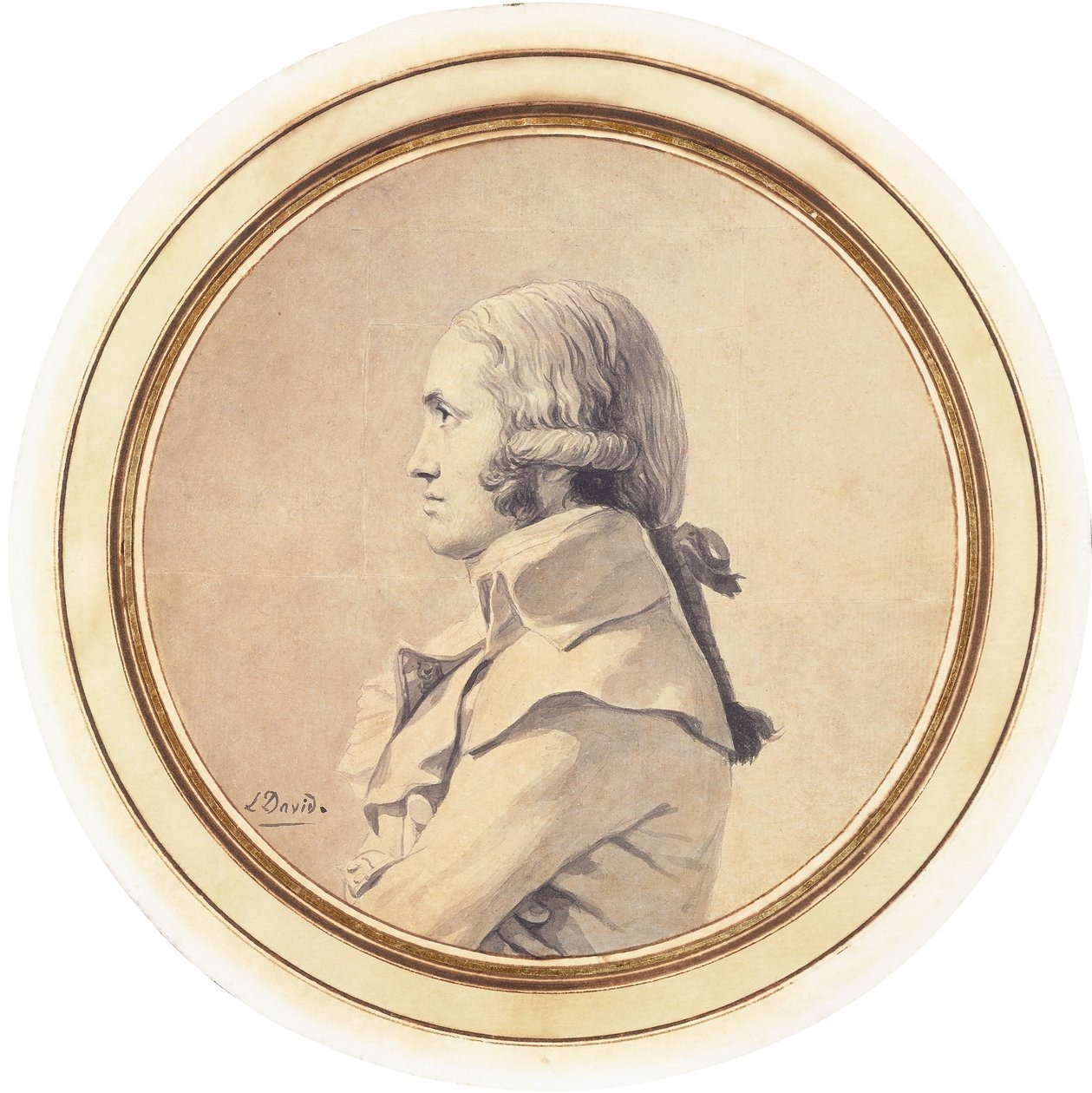
- Portrait of Joseph-Nicolas Barbeau du Barran, drawn in 1795 by Jacques-Louis David while in prison

36th President of the National Convention
- In office 4–19 February 1794
- Preceded by: Marc-Guillaume Alexis Vadier
- Succeeded by: Louis Saint-Just

Personal details
- Born: 3 July 1761 Castelnau-d'Auzan, Gascony, Kingdom of France
- Died: 16 May 1816 (aged 54) Assens, Switzerland
- Party: The Mountain
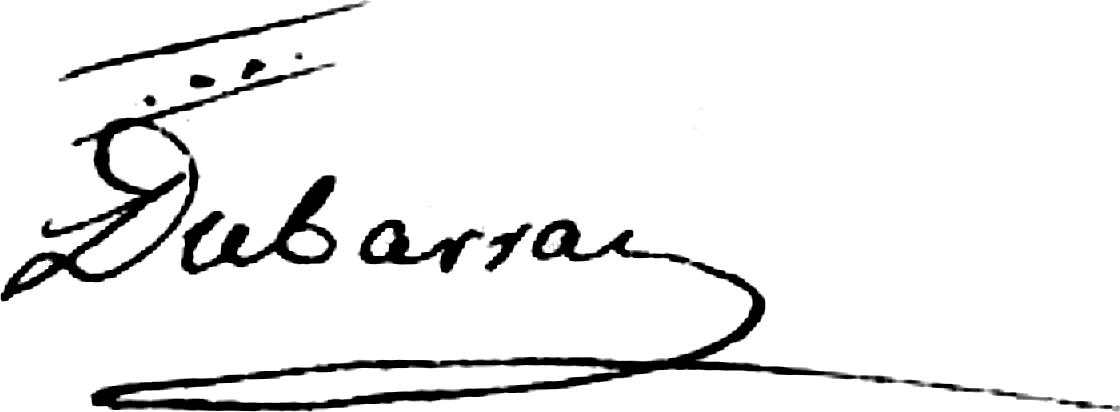
- Signature

Joseph-Nicolas Barbeau du Barran (3 July 1761, Castelnau-d'Auzan – 16 May 1816, Assens, Vaud canton) was a French politician. He was deputy to the French National Convention and a member of the Chambre des représentants de France during the Hundred Days.

== Life ==
Procureur-général syndic for the département of Le Gers, he was elected as a deputy to the Convention for the Gers département, 5 September 1792. He became one of the most ardent Montagnard deputies and one of the most influential men in the Assembly. During the trial of Louis XVI he voted in favour of the king's culpability, against the ratification of the court's decision by the people, in favour of the death penalty and against postponement. He justified his decision in favour of the death penalty for the king by saying "I've consulted the law; it tells me that all conspirators deserve death. The same law also tells me that the same penalty must apply to the same crimes: I vote for death". On 13 April 1793 he voted against the trial of Jean-Paul Marat and on 28 May that year voted against the decision of the decree which had broken up the Commission of Twelve on 27 May.

President of the club des Jacobins, he became a member of the comité des pétitions, the Comité d'alinéation and the Committee of General Security. He condemned his colleague Asselin for giving refuge to the marquise Luppé de Chauny (who had been condemned to death). An opponent of Robespierre, he fought to take over his position. After 9 Thermidor (27 July 1794) he took on the defence of Jacques Nicolas Billaud-Varenne and Bertrand Barère and opposed the trial of former members of the Committee of Public Safety. He was implicated in the Revolt of 1 prairial year III (20 May 1795) and condemned to deportation before being given an amnesty.

Elected to the Chambre des représentants for Gers during the Hundred Days, the law of 12 January 1816 after the Second Restoration condemned Barran to exile as a regicide and he spent the rest of his life in Switzerland.

== Sources ==
- (in French) Archives parlementaires de 1787 à 1860 : recueil complet des débats législatifs et politiques des Chambres françaises. Première série, 1787 à 1799. Volumes LVII, LXII, LXV, LXVI, LXVIII and LXXI
