= Jean-Pierre-André Amar =

French politician (1755–1816)

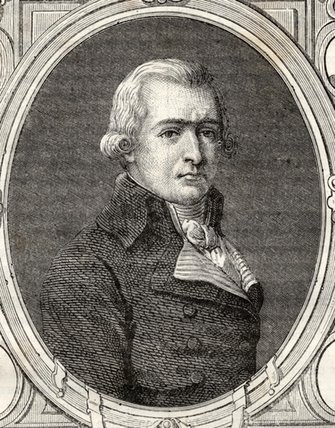
- Jean-Pierre-André Amar

40th President of the National Convention
- In office 5–20 April 1794
- Preceded by: Jean-Lambert Tallien
- Succeeded by: Jean-Baptiste Robert Lindet

Personal details
- Born: May 11, 1755 Grenoble, Kingdom of France
- Died: 21 December 1816 (aged 61) Paris, France
- Party: The Mountain
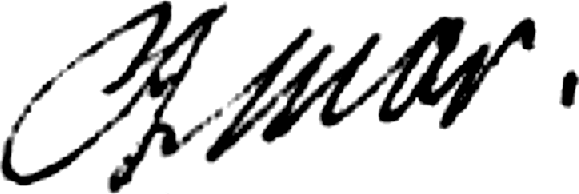
- Signature

Jean-Pierre-André Amar or Jean-Baptiste-André Amar (May 11, 1755 – December 21, 1816) was a French political figure of the Revolution and Freemason.

== Life ==
=== Early activities ===
Born in a rich family of cloth merchants in Grenoble, Amar was the son of the former Director of the Mint. He became a lawyer for the local parlement in 1774. In 1786, he purchased the title of Trésorier de France for the tax region of the Dauphiné, which gave him a title in the French nobility, for 200,000 livres.

In 1789, he was one of the founders of the Grenoble patriotic society, which in December of that year published the first edition of La Vedette des Alpes. In 1790, Amar was elected vice-president of the Grenoble directory, and became a deputy to the National Convention for the département of Isère, and joined The Mountain, voting in favor of Louis XVI's execution during his trial.

=== Prominence ===
Sent on mission with Jean-Marie François Merlino to Ain and Isère in early 1793, he oversaw the levée en masse of 300,000 soldiers brought about by the outbreak of the French Revolutionary Wars and he made widespread arrests of "counter-revolutionaries". After the ousting of the Girondists from the Convention in late May and early June 1793, Amar joined the Committee of General Security on September 13. He was, with Marc-Guillaume Alexis Vadier, one of its most influential members. He was noted for his attacks on the Girondists and his order in October 1793 to arrest the 46 deputies who had protested against the violence of The Mountain. He also argued against women's rights by stating women "are hardly capable of lofty conceptions and serious cogitation". In doing so he kept them from gaining political rights.

=== Liquidation Scandal ===
In November 1793 the Convention charged him, together with Fabre D'Eglantine, with investigating the Liquidation Scandal. Amar's investigations uncovered the fact that Fabre himself had been deeply involved in the fraud. The arrest of Fabre on January 13, 1794, helped precipitate the power struggle between his ally Danton and Robespierre. On March 16 Amar presented his report on the Liquidation Scandal to the convention, and on March 31 Amar was one of the Committee Members who signed the decree for the arrest of Danton. However, Robespierre was sharply critical of Amar's report, which presented the scandal as purely a matter of fraud. Robespierre insisted that it was a foreign plot, demanded that the report be re-written, and used the scandal as the basis for rhetorical attacks on the foreign powers he believed were involved. On July 23, 1794, Robespierre attacked Amar by name at a joint session of the Committees for his handling of the Liquidation Scandal. Amar was involved in the Thermidorian Reaction from its very beginning.

=== Later life ===
Arrested himself as a former partisan of Terror (April 2, 1795), he benefitted from an amnesty on October 26. Amar then opposed the establishment of the French Directory in November, and in February 1796 he presented a petition from 'Patriots of '89' urging the re-establishment of price controls on basic foods. The Directory refused to consider it. He took part in the conspiracy of Gracchus Babeuf early in 1796; tried by the Court in Vendôme, he was acquitted on May 26.

He retired from public life, and lived most of his remaining years in Isère and Savoie, discovering devotional mysticism based on the works of Emanuel Swedenborg. When the Bourbon dynasty returned to power, he was not banished like other members of the Convention He died in Paris.

== Sources ==
- Albert Soboul, Dictionnaire historique de la Révolution française, PUF 1989.
- Jean Tulard, Jean-François Fayard et Alfred Fierro, Histoire et dictionnaire de la Révolution française. 1789–1799, éd. Robert Laffont, coll. « Bouquins », Paris, 1987, 1998 [détail de l’édition]
- Archives parlementaires de 1787 à 1860: recueil complet des débats législatifs et politiques des Chambres françaises. First series, 1787 à 1799. Tomes LV, LVI, LVII, LX, LXI, LXII, LXV, LXVI, LXIX, LXX et LXXI.
- Documents historiques sur les origines de la Révolution dauphinoise de 1788 Grenoble, 1888, p. 76–90 for relation to Freemasony.
