= Étienne-François Letourneur =

French lawyer, soldier and politician (1751–1817)

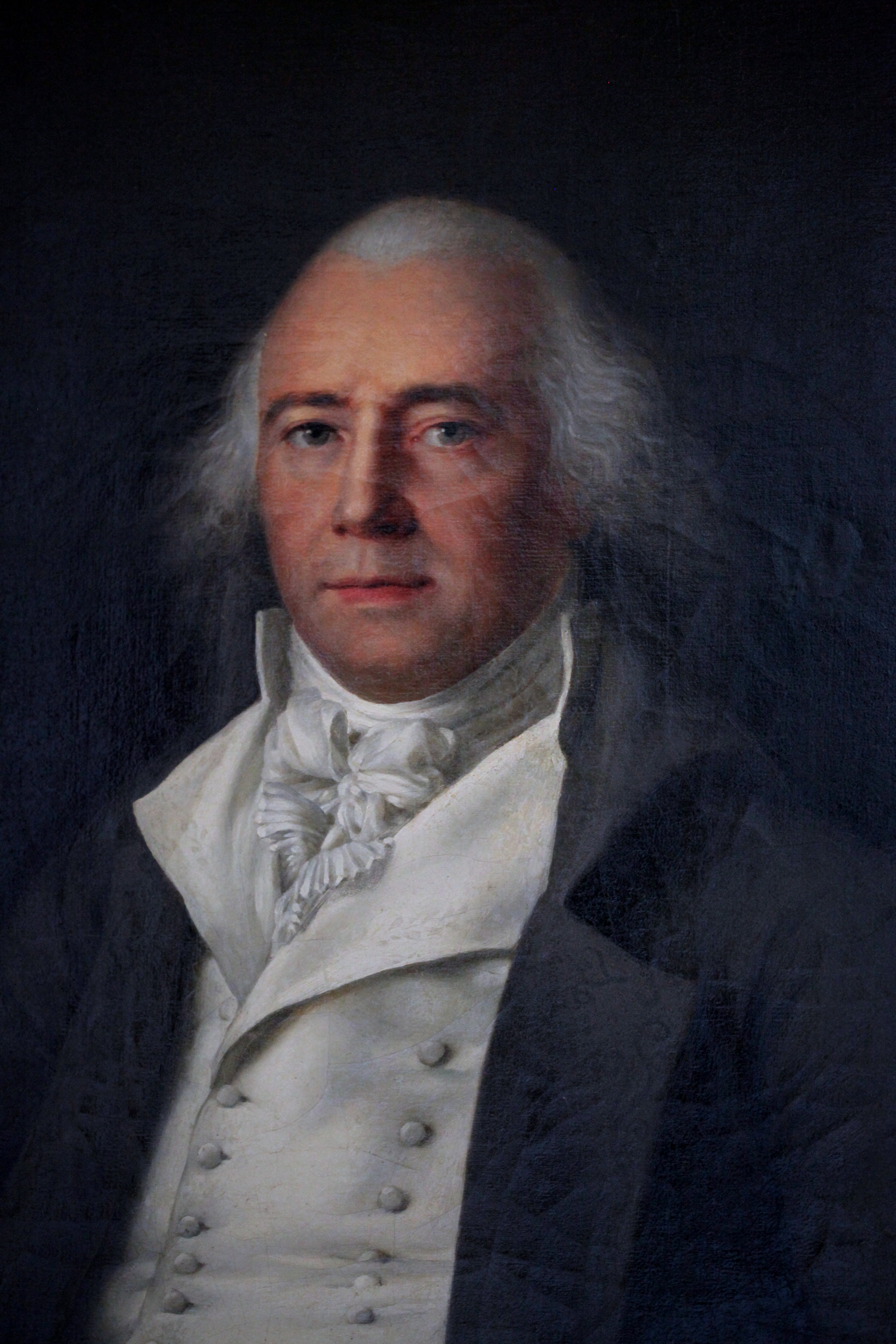
- Portrait by Jean-Baptiste François Desoria, 1796

Member of the Council of Ancients
- In office 24 September 1795 – 26 December 1799

Member of the Directory
- In office 1 November 1795 – 20 May 1797

58th President of the National Convention
- In office 6–20 January 1795
- Preceded by: Pierre-Louis Bentabole
- Succeeded by: Joseph Stanislas Rovère

Deputy of the National Convention
- In office 21 September 1792 – 26 October 1795

Member of the Legislative Assembly
- In office 1 October 1791 – 20 September 1792

Personal details
- Born: Étienne-François-Louis-Honoré Letourneur; 15 March 1751 Granville, Manche, Kingdom of France
- Died: 4 October 1817 (aged 66) Brussels, United Kingdom of the Netherlands
- Nicknames: Le Tourneur; Le Tourneur de la Manche

Étienne-François-Louis-Honoré Letourneur (15 March 1751 – 4 October 1817), also known as Le Tourneur or Le Tourneur de la Manche, was a French lawyer, soldier, and politician of the French Revolution.

== Early life and career ==
Born in Granville, Manche, he studied at a military school, then served in the Nord, and in Cherbourg. In 1792, he was elected to the Legislative Assembly for Manche, and voted in favor of King Louis XVI's execution, against a suspended sentence (but in favor of possibility of appeal to the people's mercy).

== Political career ==
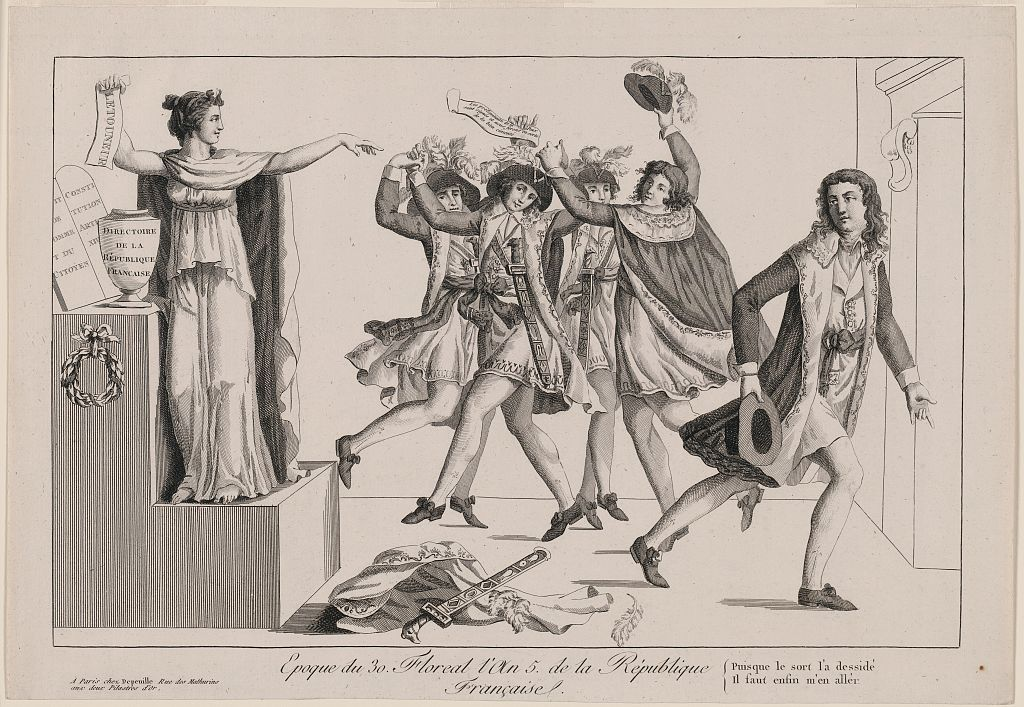
Political caricature showing Letourneur leaving the French Directory (19 April 1797)

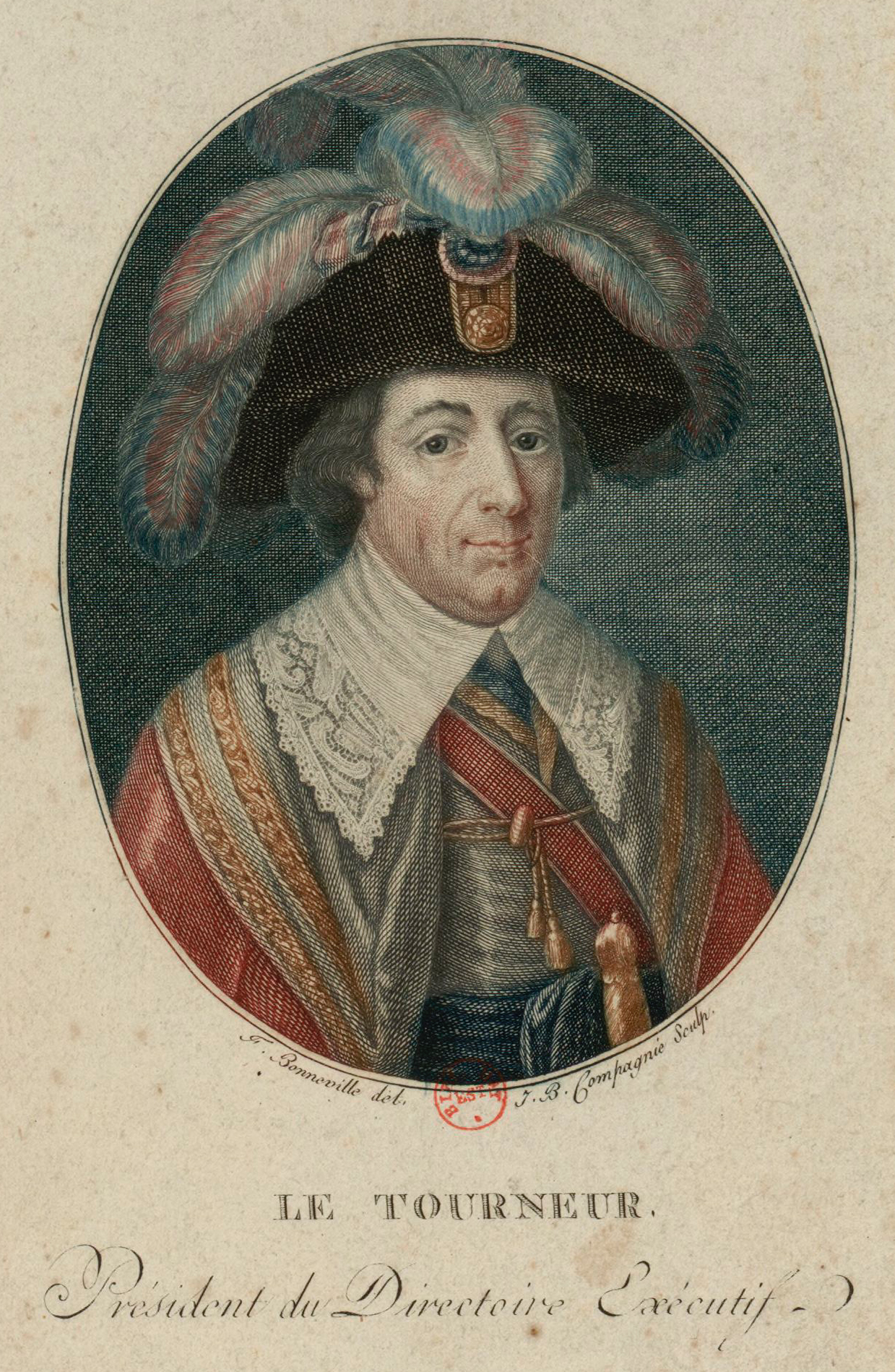
Etienne-François Letourneur

Letourneur served the Republic's National Convention as an overseer of defense during the Siege of Toulon, and took the task of reorganizing the Mediterranean Fleet. He was elected to the French Directory's Council of Ancients, became one of the government leaders ("directors") on 2 November 1795. In April 1797 he left office, under the system whereby one director retired each year, chosen by lot (illustration). He then became a general of the French Revolutionary Army.

Under the Consulate, Letourneur was designated by Napoleon Bonaparte préfet of the Loire-Inférieure département, then counsel for the Cour des Comptes. Nevertheless, Letourneur was exiled after the end of the French Empire for regicide, living the rest of his life in Brussels.
