= Pierre-Louis Bentabole =

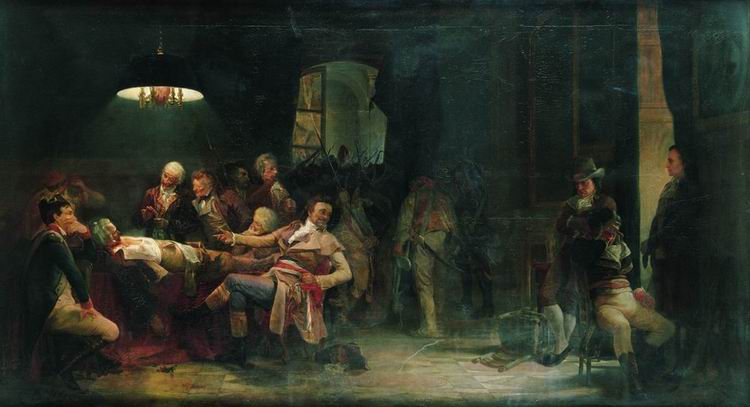
- Ninth Thermidor

57th President of the National Convention
- In office 21 December 1794 – 6 January 1795
- Preceded by: Jean-François Rewbell
- Succeeded by: Étienne-François Letourneur

Personal details
- Born: 4 June 1756 Landau, Alsace, Kingdom of France
- Died: 22 April 1798 (aged 41) Paris, France
- Political party: Jacobin Club; Montagnards; Cordeliers; Thermidorian
- Spouse: Adelaide Charlotte Chabot
- Occupation: Lawyer

Pierre Louis Bentabole (or Bentabolle) was a French revolutionary and statesman, born in Landau Haut Rhin on 4 June 1756 and died in Paris on 22 April 1798. As a lawyer, he presided and practiced in the districts Hagenau and Saverne; he was appointed as the deputy of the Haut-Rhin to the National Convention on 4 September 1792; he voted to execute Louis XVI during his service. On 6 October 1794, he was appointed to the Committee of Public Safety.

== Family ==
Bentabole was the son of a military contractor who made his fortune providing food for the military during the Seven Years' War. He studied law and was a lawyer in Colmar before the French Revolution. On 4 September 1792, he was elected to the National Convention for the Bas-Rhin, by 293 votes out of 386 possible.

== Affiliation with the Montagnards ==
In 1792, he stood with the radical revolutionaries in Paris, and urged the convention to seek the death penalty for the King in October. At the trial of Louis XVI, he unhesitatingly voted for the King's death: "I see Louis stained with the blood of his victims, for the peace of my country, for his happiness, I voted for the death." A bitter enemy of the Girondins, he attacked them vehemently during the question of a plebiscite on whether to execute the King.

True to the revolutionary ideals, Bentabole aligned with the Montagnards and he was one of its most ardent enthusiasts. He was faithful friend of Jean-Paul Marat; through this friendship with the so-called L'Ami du peuple, (Friend of the People, the title of one of Marat's pamphlets), Bentabole acquired the nickname "Marat Cadet". The death of Marat on 14 July 1793, brought some of the internal frictions of the Montagnards to head, principally between Bentabole and the powerful Robespierre. On the day following Marat's assassination, the Convention rushed to praise Marat for his fervor and revolutionary diligence. Robespierre did not join in the praise, simply calling for an inquiry into the circumstances of his death. The Convention discussed at length the plans for Marat's funeral, to be held in his honor; it would necessarily be an affair of State, and, because of Marat's poverty, would have to be at the State's expense. Robespierre was no great supporter of Marat, saw no need for a public funeral, fearing, perhaps that it would arouse popular anger or provoke violence, as the funeral of Claude Lazowski had earlier in the year. (Note: Claude Lazowski (1758–1793), also called Claude Lajouski, was born a gentleman, the son of a Polish refugee who had come with King Stanislaus to France with the future queen of Louis XV. After a series of low-level positions in the royal bureaucracy, his true talents as a street organizer were recognized in the 1789 and 1790. He was a useful doer of the dirty work. He was a member of the insurrection Commune of 10 August (1790), and one of the officers that went with Fournier to bring the political prisoners of Orleans to Paris and looked on while a mob massacred them. He went on missions to the Departments, and expeditions to search the houses of suspects. He acquired his greatest notoriety in March 1793, when he was charged as a leader of an aborted rising, but there was no evidence against him. He may have been poisoned, or he may have died of drink. His funeral became a pageant, organized by David, with funeral orations by Louis Grégoire Deschamps Destournelles and Robespierre had brought the sans-culottes into the streets.) The dispute between Bentabole and Robespierre continued; Robespierre saw no need neither to bury the body need Mirabeau; Bentabole insisted.

== Purification of the Revolution ==
At the beginning of the year 1794, he was elected member of the Committee of War.

In August 1793, he sent as a representative on mission to the Northern army.

By August 1794, Bentabole was already distancing himself from the arch-Montigards. The problem in the Committees was that attacks on any member of the convention could come from any source; a statement, whether muttered privately or pronounced from the dais, could generate a cascade of accusations. Bentabole had led an attack on the Jacobin Club, which he accused of seeking to supplant the convention and to be dominated by lobbyists.

Among the opinions offered to the Tribunal, I noticed Durand-Maillane's, for which I request that he give us a report. Every honest man should want that the freedom of opinion never be jeopardized by unproven charges or invective. We should not swear at men whom we look upon as 'weak beings' in order to shackle the opinions that they only want to express for the good of the People. If someone here believes that they should make a serious reproach toward one of his colleagues, let him explain himself and stipulate the facts, not just offer insults. Let the accused be heard, and let us not seek to make people fear from threats. Only the conspirators should be afraid."

His proposal received excited applause. Yet, while watching the Terror spread around him, Bentabole could do little to stop it, or thought as much, and sought as much time as he could away from Paris. In January 1794, he accepted an assignment into Sarthe; during this mission that he started a relationship with a wealthy aristocrat widow Adelaide Charlotte Chabot (a connection of the House of Rohan). When he returned to Paris in March 1795, she came with him, as his wife. (Note: Through this union, he bought land and became lord of La Bazoche-Gouet in Eure-et-Loir. He also owned with his wife one of the largest gambling houses in Paris, close to Maison Duplay, which lay near to Robespierre's home.) The influence of his wife, or perhaps his fear for her, brought him to more moderate political views, binding him to Georges Danton and some of the Dantonist and supporters of the Cordeliers, or the Indulgents. When Danton, and his Bentabole's friend Marie-Jean Hérault de Séchelles, were brought to trial for their treason, he attested to the convention the patriotism of his friend. Hérault was an object of suspicion to the other members of the committee, especially to Maximilien Robespierre, who as a deist and a follower of the ideas of Jean-Jacques Rousseau, resented Hérault and other followers of Denis Diderot's naturalism. Hérault was also of an aristocratic background, another suspicious trait. Danton, Hérault and several others were tried before the Revolutionary Tribunal and condemned alongside together. Danton, Hérault, François Joseph Westermann, Camille Desmoulins, and Pierre Philippeaux were guillotined on the same day: 5 April 1794 (16th Germinal in the year II).

== Containing the Terror ==
After the death of Danton and the others, Bentabole realized that he, and some of the other moderate Montigards, now had become Robespierre's targets. Over time, they had moderated their stances, whereas Robespierre and his allies had not. Initially Bentabole planned to simply assassinate Robespierre; he could get close enough to him to stab the man. When he shared this idea with one of his closest friends, though, the assassination metamorphosed into a plan. Many who conspired against Robespierre did so for strong practical and personal reasons, most notably self-preservation. Such surviving Dantonists as Merlin de Thionville wanted revenge for the death of Georges Danton; others wished to protect their own heads. Among the latter were Joseph Fouché and Pierre-Louis Bentabole. Yet, for three months, the plotters waffled: how should they do it, what was the best strategy?

Ultimately, though, it was Robespierre himself who united his enemies against him. On 8 Thermidor (26 July) he gave a speech to the Convention in which he railed against enemies and conspiracies, some within the powerful committees. As he did not give the names of "these traitors", all in the Convention feared that they were his targets. Later, at the Jacobin Club, he denounced Collot and Billaud. These men then spent the night planning the following day's coup, with other members of the convention. The following day, Bentabole, Tallien and Merlin de Thionville attacked the "followers of Robespierre". Five days later, he moved that the legislation allowing the arrest, trial and execution of anyone without representatives that they are not heard by the convention, as had been the case during the removal of Dantonist. Bentabole's proposal was enthusiastically accepted by his colleagues. This completed the fall of that so-called Incorruptible on 9 Thermidor. After Thermidor Bentabole participated in the dismemberment of the revolutionary government.

The 15 Vendemiaire Year III, he was appointed to the Committee of Public Safety along with other Thermidorians reactors such as Reubell, Reverchon and Laporte . Shortly after he called for the permanent closure of the Jacobin Club in Paris. On 21 December 1794, during the Thermidorian reaction, he was elected president of the convention.

In October 1795 after the announcement of the results of elections against Thermidorians, he asked that the convention, which has two vacancies, elect the Executive Board on the field, without waiting for the arrival of new members. In line with the wishes of Tallien Bentabole and friends wish to cancel the results but the maneuver fails under pressure from moderates led by Thibaudeau.

Bentabole still managed to be elected to the Council of Five Hundred among moderate Republicans supporters of the Revolution.

Classified by the government as a Jacobin, he was not re-elected in 1798.

== Notes, citations and sources ==
=== Sources ===
- Andress, David. The Terror: The Merciless War for Freedom in Revolutionary France. New York, Macmillan, 2006.
- (in French) Carnot, Lazare, Étienne Charavay, Août 1792-Mars 1793. Imprimerie nationale, 1892
- Bradby, E.D. The Apotheosis of Lazowski. The Contemporary Review, A. Strahan, 1921, vol. 120, pp. 795–805.
- Roberts, Warren. Jacques-Louis David and Jean-Louis Prieur, Revolutionary Artists. Albany, SUNY Press, 2000, p 289.
- Mathurin de Lescure, ed., Mémoires sur les assemblées parlementaires de la révolution, 2 vols. (Paris: Firmin-Didot et cie, 1881), 2:410–13. Translated by Exploring the French Revolution project staff from original documents in French found in John Hardman, French Revolution Documents 1792–95, vol. 2, New York: Barnes & Noble Books, 1973, pp. 263–64. Available here: Liberty, Equality, Fraternity: Exploring the French Revolution. Accessed 6 Feb 2015.
