= Élie Lacoste =

French doctor and politician (1745–1806)

45th President of the National Convention
- In office 19 June – 5 July 1794
- Preceded by: Maximilien Robespierre
- Succeeded by: Jean-Antoine Louis

Deputy of the National Convention
- In office 20 September 1792 – 26 October 1795
- Constituency: Dordogne

Deputy of the Legislative Assembly
- In office 1 September 1791 – 20 September 1792
- Constituency: Dordogne

Personal details
- Born: September 18, 1745 Montignac, Kingdom of France
- Died: November 26, 1806 (aged 61) Montignac, French Empire
- Party: The Mountain
- Profession: Doctor
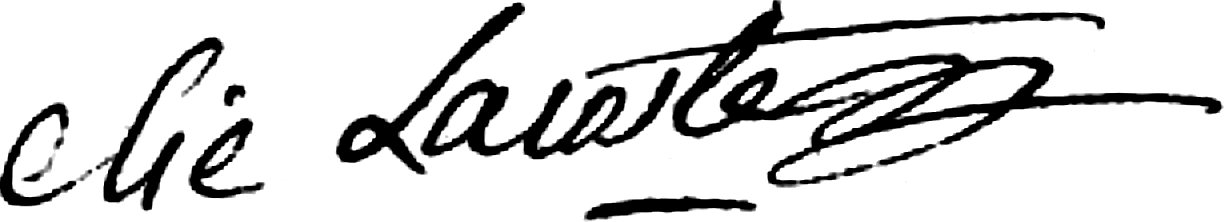
- Signature

Élie Lacoste (18 September 1745 – 26 November 1806) was a French medical doctor and politician of the French Revolution. Born and died in Montignac, he served as a deputy to the Legislative Assembly and the National Convention.

== Biography ==
A doctor in Montignac, like his father and great-grandfather, Lacoste was a supporter of revolutionary ideas. After killing a nobleman from Périgord in a duel, he became an administrator of the Dordogne department in 1789.

=== Legislative Assembly ===
Following the adoption of the French Constitution of 1791, France became a constitutional monarchy. In 1791, Lacoste was elected to the Legislative Assembly as the sixth of ten deputies for the Dordogne department. He sat with the political left. In February 1792, he voted for the indictment of the Minister of the Navy, Antoine François Bertrand de Molleville. In April, he voted to grant the honors of the session to the soldiers of the Châteauvieux Regiment for their role in the Nancy affair. In August, he voted for the indictment of the Marquis de Lafayette.

=== National Convention ===
The monarchy was abolished following the insurrection of 10 August 1792, and Louis XVI was imprisoned. Lacoste was re-elected as a deputy for Dordogne, the third of ten, to the new National Convention.

He sat with The Mountain. During the trial of Louis XVI, he voted for the death penalty and against both the popular referendum and the stay of execution. In April 1793, he was absent for the vote on the indictment of Jean-Paul Marat. In May, he was also absent for the vote to reinstate the Commission of Twelve.

==== Representative on Mission and Committee Member ====
On 8 March 1793, Lacoste was first sent as a representative on mission, alongside Jean-Baptiste Bô, to the Droits-de-l'Homme section of Paris. The following day, he and Jean-Bon Saint-André were dispatched to the departments of Dordogne and Lot to accelerate the levée en masse decreed in February. In July, he was sent on a mission to the departments of Aisne, Ardennes, Oise, Nord, Seine-Inférieure, and Somme.

Elected to the Committee of General Security in September 1793, he was responsible for significant police and administrative work. However, he refused to take charge of the food supply for Paris, declaring himself incompetent for the task.

On 3 November 1793 (13 Brumaire, Year II), he was sent on a mission to the Army of the Rhine and the Army of the Moselle with Jean-François Ehrmann, Marc-Antoine Baudot, and Antoine Lémane. He took part in the Battle of Kaiserslautern. He came into conflict with Louis Antoine de Saint-Just and Philippe-François-Joseph Le Bas, who arrived after him. Lacoste had appointed Lazare Hoche as commander-in-chief of the two combined armies, while Saint-Just and Le Bas preferred Jean-Charles Pichegru. Lacoste returned to Paris with Baudot on 14 January 1794 (25 Nivôse, Year II) before returning to the armies. On 27 January (8 Pluviôse), the two men issued a decree in Strasbourg requisitioning 30,000 pairs of shoes and 3,000 coats from the population to supply the troops.

==== Thermidor and later life ====
During the Thermidorian Reaction on 9 Thermidor, Year II (27 July 1794), Lacoste spoke out against Maximilien Robespierre in the Convention and demanded the arrests of Georges Couthon and Louis Antoine de Saint-Just, though he did not accuse members of the Paris Commune.

After defending former members of the government committees, he was himself placed under arrest on 20 May 1795 (1 Prairial, Year III). He was released under the general amnesty of 26 October 1795 (4 Brumaire, Year IV). His political career over, Lacoste returned to Montignac and resumed his work as a doctor.

== Bibliography ==
- Robert, Adolphe; Cougny, Gaston (1889–1891). Dictionnaire des parlementaires français de 1789 à 1889 (in French). Paris: Edgar Bourloton.
- Tulard, Jean; Fayard, Jean-François; Fierro, Alfred. Histoire et dictionnaire de la Révolution française 1789-1799 (in French).
