= Declaration of Rights =

Declaration of Rights may refer to:

- Bill of rights (general notion)
- Declaration of Right, 1689, which led to the Bill of Rights 1689, enacted by the Parliament of England
- Declaration of Rights and Grievances, 1765 colonial protest in North America to the British Stamp Act
- Declaration and Resolves of the First Continental Congress, 1774 enumeration of colonial rights early in the American Revolution
- Virginia Declaration of Rights, adopted in Virginia in 1776
- Declaration of the Rights of Man and of the Citizen, adopted in France in 1789
- Declaration of the Rights of Woman and the Female Citizen, written in France in 1791
- Declaration of the Rights of Man and Citizen of 1793, written in France in 1793
- Declaration of the Rights of the Negro Peoples of the World, adopted at the 1920 Universal Negro Improvement Association convention
- Universal Declaration of Human Rights, adopted by the United Nations General Assembly in 1948
- Declaration on the Rights of Indigenous Peoples by the United Nations General Assembly in 2007
- "Declaration of Rights", a song by the reggae group The Abyssinians
