= French Constitution of 1793 =

Document of the French Revolution

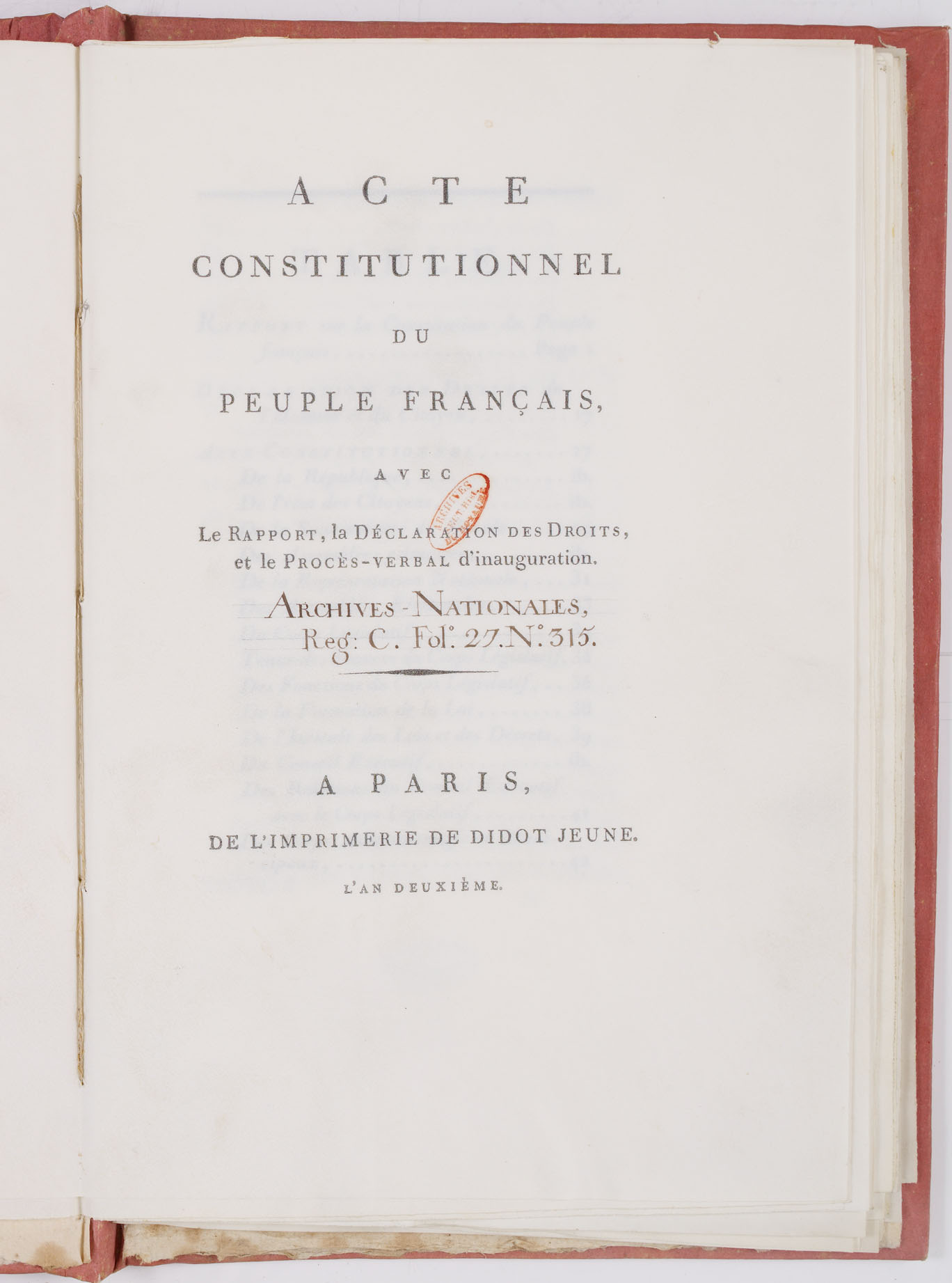
- Copy of the constitution at the Archives Nationales

Overview
- Original title: (in French) Constitution de l'an I
- Jurisdiction: France
- Presented: 10 June 1793
- System: Revolutionary republic
- Chambers: Unicameral (National Convention)
- Executive: National Convention
- Supersedes: French Constitution of 1791
- Superseded by: French Constitution of 1795

The Constitution of 1793 (French: Acte constitutionnel du 24 juin 1793), also known as the Constitution of the Year I or the Montagnard Constitution, was the second constitution ratified for use during the French Revolution under the First Republic. Designed by the Montagnards, principally Maximilien Robespierre and Louis Saint-Just, it was intended to replace the constitutional monarchy of 1791 and the Girondin constitutional project. With sweeping plans for democratization and wealth redistribution, the new document promised a departure from political moderates' revolutionary goals.

The Constitution's radical provisions were never implemented, and the government placed a moratorium upon it, ostensibly because of the need to employ emergency war powers during the French Revolutionary War. Those same emergency powers would permit the Committee of Public Safety to conduct the Reign of Terror, and when that period of violent political combat was over, the constitution was invalidated by its association with the defeated Robespierre. In the Thermidorian Reaction, it was discarded in favor of a more conservative document, the Constitution of 1795.

== Assembly ==
Chart of constitutional mechanisms

On 11 December 1792 Brissot, Pétion de Villeneuve, Marquis de Condorcet, Vergniaud, Gensonné, Th. Payne, Sieyès, Barère and Danton were commissioned to prepare a new constitution. The first six people were Girondins and enemies of Robespierre. On 19 December Barère presented their first report. On 15 February 1793 they presented a draft in the convention. On 27 February Robespierre invited the Jacobins to examine the draft. On 15–17 April the Convention discussed the Declaration of the Rights of the Man and of the Citizen of 1793, a French political document that preceded that country's first republican constitution. On 19 April Robespierre opposed article 7. On 22 April the Convention discussed article 29: the right of resistance. On 24 April Robespierre proposed a few important changes on property. On 27 April Robespierre read the Declaration in the Jacobin Club.

== Adoption ==
On 2 June 1793 after an insurrection and the fall of the Girondins the National Convention chose Louis Saint-Just and several other deputies to serve on a committee that would draft a new governmental system for the recently established Republic. The new constitution was intended to supersede the Constitution of 1791, which had been based on principles of constitutional monarchy that were now obsolete after the execution of King Louis XVI. The draftsmen were also placed on the elite Committee of Public Safety to maximize their resources. The Convention deemed their work to be of supreme importance, to be completed "in the shortest possible time."

The work took eight days. A complete constitutional document was submitted to the convention on 10 June 1793. It was subsequently accepted by that body on 24 June and put to a public referendum. Employing universal male suffrage, the vote was a resounding popular victory for the new constitution, which received the approval of 1,784,377 out of approximately 1,800,000 voters.

The Constitution expanded upon the Declaration of the Rights of Man and of the Citizen of 1789, to which it added several rights: it proclaimed the superiority of popular sovereignty over national sovereignty. It added several new economic and social rights, including right of association, right to work and public assistance, right to public education, right of rebellion (and duty to rebel when the government violates the right of the people), all written into what is known as the Declaration of the Rights of Man and Citizen of 1793.

On 25 June 1793, Jacques Roux presented an address to the National Convention, criticizing the new constitution for failing to prohibit speculation and food hoarding. His speech, later known as the Manifesto of the Enragés, called for stronger measures to protect the poor from rising food prices.

== Contents ==
Sections 1 through 6 spelled out exactly who should be treated as a French Citizen and under what conditions citizenship could be revoked. All males over the age of 21 who worked, owned land or other property in France, lived in France for over a year, or had family ties to a French person, or those specifically named by the legislative body would be considered citizens. Citizens sentenced to corporal or dishonourable punishment, or who had accepted offices or favors "which do not proceed from a democratic government" would lose their citizenship, which could be suspended if you were under investigation or being held in contempt of court.

Sections 7 through 44 specified the sovereign powers of the People, the Primary Assemblies, the National Representation, of the Electoral Assemblies, and of the Legislative Body. The Primary Assemblies were to comprise between 200 and 600 people, each representing an individual canton, who would vote to accept laws proposed by the Legislative Body, select deputies to the National Representation, and select electors to the Electoral Assemblies. The Constitution made explicit that representation would only be determined by population, not by groups (as in the Estates-General, in which each Estate had its separate representation). In the case of a tied vote in the National Representation, the oldest member would supply the tie-breaking vote.

Sections 45 to 52 laid out specific procedures to be followed by the Legislative Body, specifying a quorum of 200 members.

Sections 53 to 55 specified what issues are matters of law, while 56 through 61 establish the path for a bill to become a law. After being drafted and approved by the Legislative Body, the law would be considered a "proposed law" and voted on by all of the communes of France. No debate was to occur until 2 weeks after this distribution, and the bill would become law provided that no more than 1/10ths of the communes voted to voice objection to the law.

Sections 62 to 74 dealt with the Executive Power, which was to be placed in the hands of a 24-member executive council appointed by the Electoral Assembly. These members were to appoint agents to high administrative offices of the Republic.

The Constitution prescribed the relationship between the Executive Council and the Legislative Body, the governing of the Municipalities. It also established the conduct of the Civil Justice System, mandating that arbitrators be elected and that citizens could select arbitrators for their case, and of the Criminal Justice System, mandating trial by jury and representation for the accused. It specified that no citizen would be exempt from taxation and established regulations for military leadership and conduct and foreign relations.

Article 109 stated: "All Frenchmen are soldiers; all shall be exercised in the use of arms."

The Constitution declared that France was a "friend and ally of free nations", would not interfere with the government of other nations and would harbor any refugees from "nations ruled by tyrants". It also forbade the establishment of peace with an enemy that occupied French territory.

Finally, it guaranteed the right to equality, liberty, security, property, the public debt, free exercise of religion, general instruction, public assistance, the absolute liberty of the press, the right of petition, the right to hold popular assemblies, and the "enjoyment of all the Rights of man". It declared the Republic's respect for "loyalty, courage, age, filial love, and misfortune". Illegitimate children were recognized.

From the moment of its acceptance, it was made meaningless, first by the Convention itself, which had been charged to dissolve itself on completion of the document, then by the construction of the working institutions of the Terror. Condorcet, the main author of the first draft, was accused of federalism and had to go into hiding in early July.

On 4 August the French Constitution of 1793 passed through the Convention. (Note: Four articles by Robespierre affirm the unity of the human race, universal male suffrage, the need for solidarity between the peoples, and the rejection of kings.) At the end of August rebellious Marseille, Bordeaux and Lyon had not accepted the new Constitution. According to French historian Soboul, Robespierre was against the implementation before the rebellious cantons had accepted it. By mid-September the Jacobin Club suggested that the Constitution should not be published, on the argument that general will was missing, although an overwhelming majority favoured it.

== Suspension ==
In light of France's internal and external conflicts, the National Convention found sufficient reason to maintain itself as the effective national government, operating in permanent session under emergency powers, until peace was achieved, and postponed the Constitution's implementation. Though the Constitution was overwhelmingly popular and its drafting and ratification buoyed popular support for the Montagnards, the convention set it aside indefinitely on 10 October 1793 and declared a "Revolutionary Government" until a future peace. The ensuing Reign of Terror culminated in the disgrace and execution of Robespierre and Saint-Just in 1794. The Thermidorian Reaction shunned the Montagnard Constitution and eventually supplanted it by the Constitution of 1795, which established the Directory.

== Legacy ==
The revolutionaries of 1848 were inspired by this constitution, and after 1870 it passed into the ideology of the Third Republic as well. The document represents a fundamental and historic shift in political priorities, one which contributed much to later democratic institutions and developments.
