= Reign of Terror =

1793–1794 political violence in France

- Part of the French Revolution
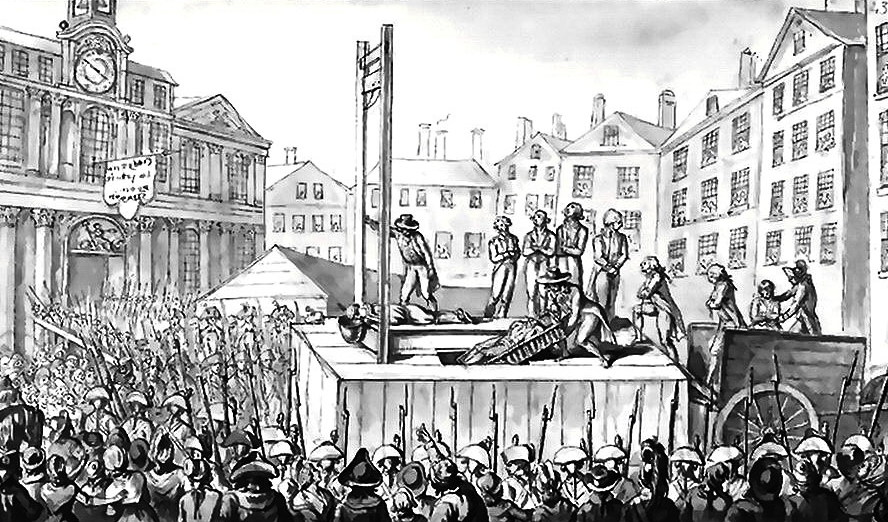
- Nine émigrés are executed by guillotine, 1793
- Location: French First Republic
- Date: 5 September 1793 – 27 July 1794
- Attack type: Political repression, mass murder, executions
- Deaths: At least 35,000–45,000
- Perpetrators: Committee of Public Safety and other revolutionary authorities

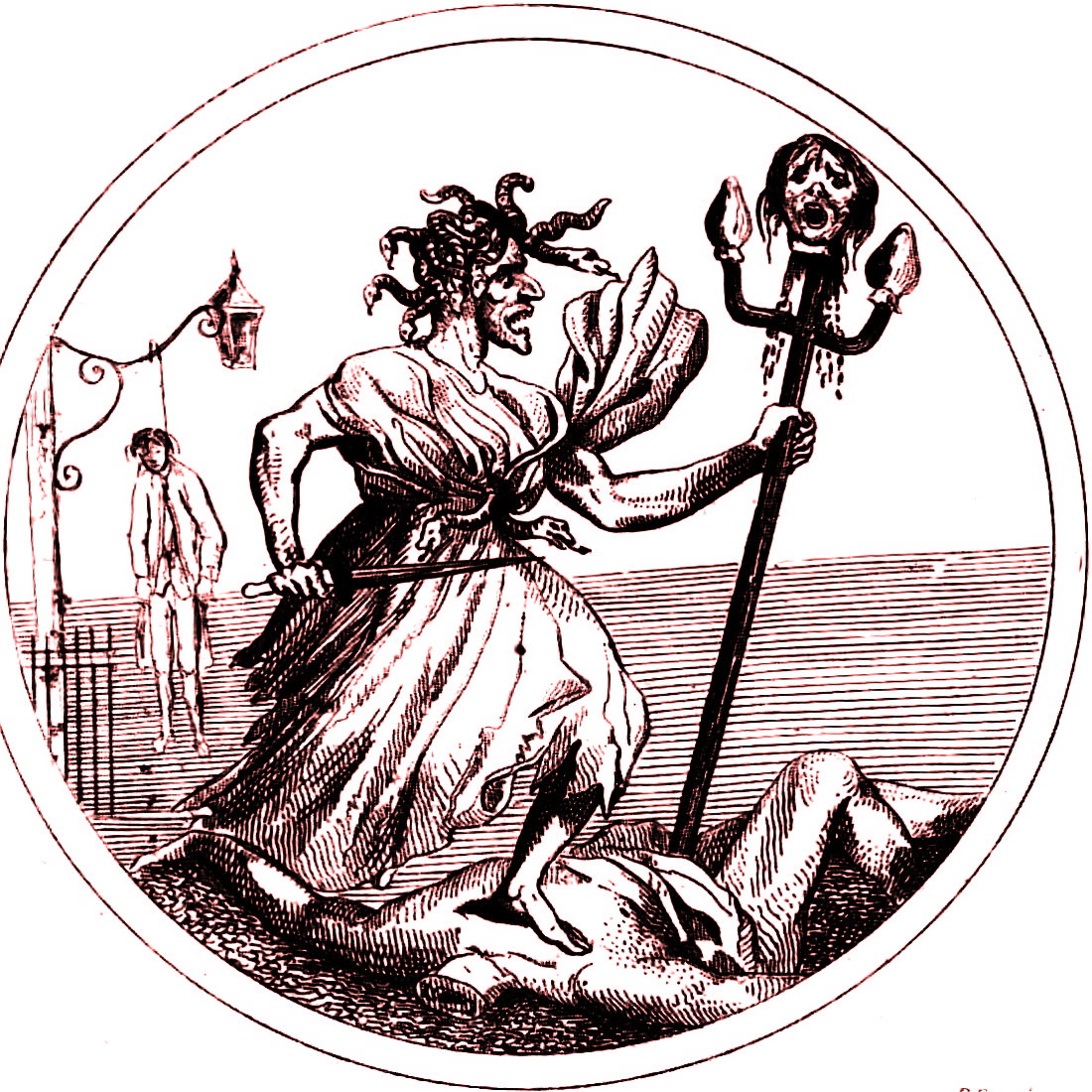
Historical caricature of the Reign of Terror.

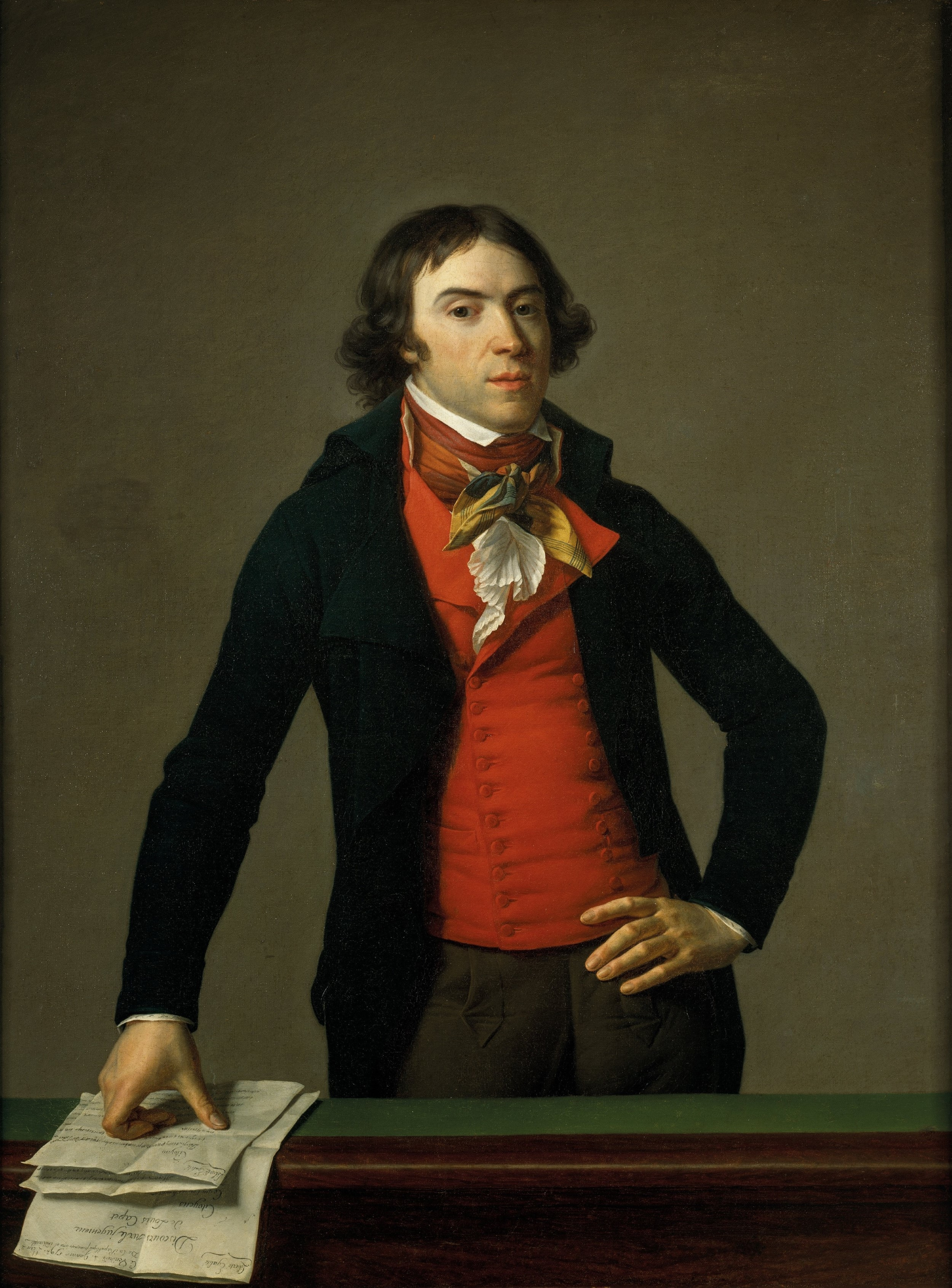
Bertrand Barère by Jean-Louis Laneuville.

The Reign of Terror (French: La Terreur, lit. 'The Terror') was a period of the French Revolution when, following the creation of the First Republic, a series of massacres and numerous public executions took place in response to the Federalist revolts, revolutionary fervour, anticlerical sentiment, and accusations of treason by the Committee of Public Safety. While terror was never formally instituted as a legal policy by the convention, it was more often employed as a concept.

Historians disagree when exactly the "Terror" began. Some consider it to have begun in 1793, often giving the date as 5 September or 10 March, when the Revolutionary Tribunal came into existence. Others cite the earlier September Massacres in 1792, or even July 1789 when the first killing of the revolution occurred. (Note: The dates July 1789, September 1792, and March 1793 are given as alternatives in Martin, Jean-Clément (2010). La Terreur, part maudite de la Révolution [The Terror: Cursed Period of the Revolution]. Découvertes Gallimard (in French). Vol. 566. Paris: Gallimard. pp. 14–15.) Will Durant stated that "strictly, it should be dated from the Law of Suspects, 17 September 1793, to the execution of Maximilien Robespierre, 28 July 1794."

The Terror concluded with the fall of Robespierre and his alleged allies in July 1794, in what is known as the Thermidorian Reaction. By then, 16,594 official death sentences had been dispensed throughout France since June 1793, of which 2,639 were in Paris alone. In addition, an estimated ten- to twenty thousand people were executed without trial or died awaiting trial in prison.

== Background ==
=== Enlightenment thought ===
Enlightenment thought emphasized the importance of rational thinking and began challenging legal and moral foundations of society, providing the leaders of the Reign of Terror with new ideas about the role and structure of government. Jean-Jacques Rousseau's Social Contract argues that each person was born with rights, and they would come together in forming a government that would then protect those rights. Under the social contract, the government was required to act for the general will, which represented the interests of everyone rather than a few factions. Drawing from the idea of a general will, Robespierre felt that the French Revolution could result in a republic built for the general will but only once those who fought against this ideal were expelled. Those who resisted the government were deemed "tyrants" fighting against the virtue and honor of the general will. The leaders felt that their ideal version of government was threatened from the inside and outside of France, and terror was the only way to preserve the dignity of the republic created in the French Revolution.

The writings of Baron de Montesquieu, another Enlightenment thinker of the time, also greatly influenced Robespierre. Montesquieu's The Spirit of Law defines a core principle of a democratic government: virtue—described as "the love of laws and of our country." In Robespierre's speech to the National Convention on 5 February 1794, he regards virtue as being the "fundamental principle of popular or democratic government." This was, in fact, the same virtue defined by Montesquieu almost 50 years prior. Robespierre believed the virtue needed for any democratic government was extremely lacking in the French people. As a result, he decided to weed out those he believed could never possess this virtue. The result was a continual push towards terror. The convention used this as justification for the course of action to "crush the enemies of the revolution…let the laws be executed…and let liberty be saved."

=== Threats of foreign invasion ===
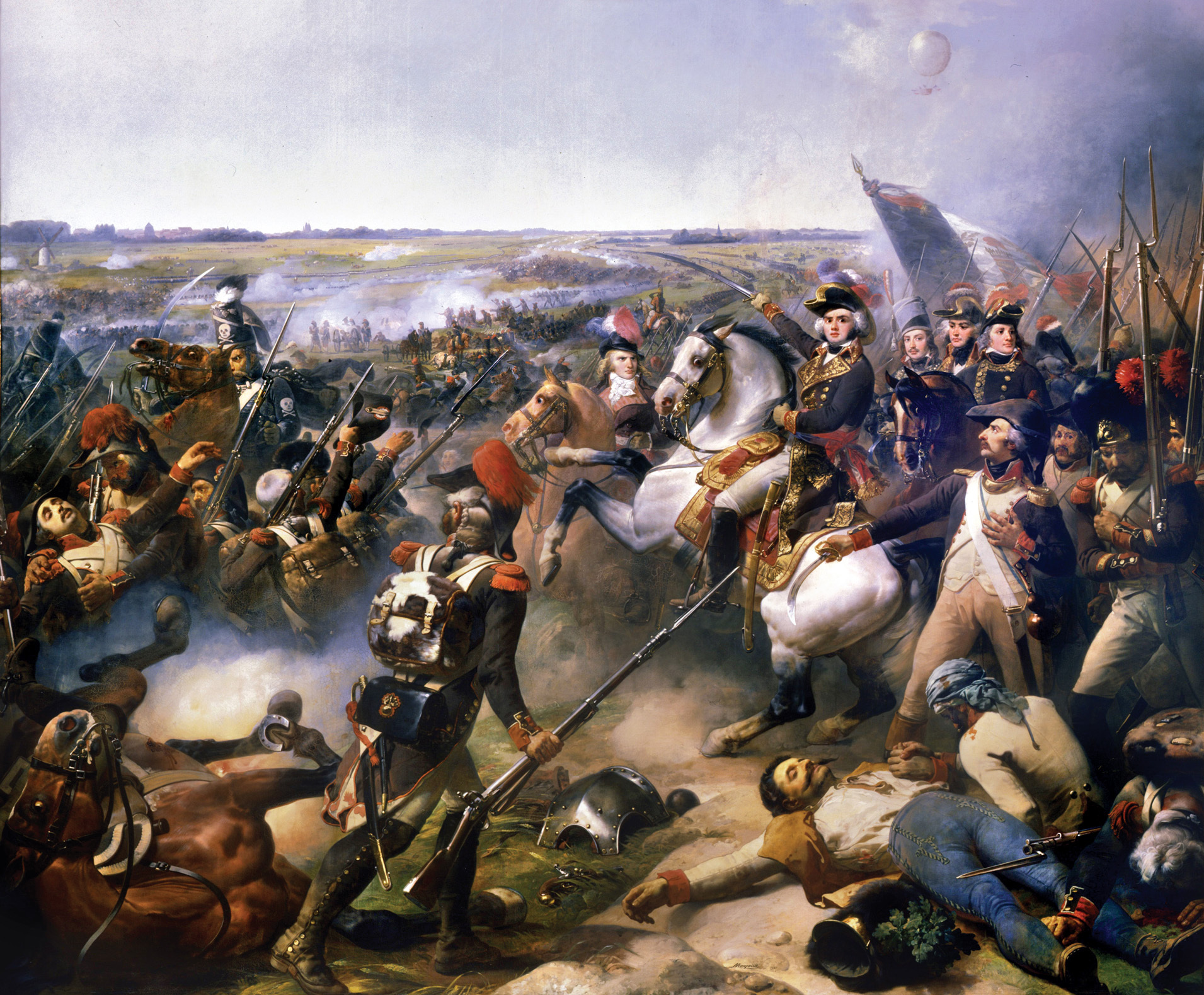
The Battle of Fleurus, won by General Jourdan over the Coalition Army led by the Prince of Coburg and William of Orange on 26 June 1794

At the beginning of the French Revolution, the surrounding monarchies did not show great hostility towards the rebellion. Though mostly ignored, Louis XVI was later able to find support in Leopold II of Austria (brother of Marie Antoinette) and Frederick William II of Prussia. On 27 August 1791, these foreign leaders made the Pillnitz Declaration, saying they would restore the French monarch if other European rulers joined. In response to what they viewed to be the meddling of foreign powers, France declared war on 20 April 1792. However, at this point, the war was only Prussia and Austria against France.

Massive reforms of military institutions, while very effective in the long run, presented the initial problems of inexperienced forces and leaders of questionable political loyalty. In the time it took for officers of merit to use their new freedoms to climb the chain of command, France suffered. Many of the early battles were definitive losses for the French. There was the constant threat of the Austro-Prussian forces which were advancing easily toward the capital, threatening to destroy Paris if the monarch was harmed. This series of defeats, coupled with militant uprisings and protests within the borders of France, pushed the government to resort to drastic measures to ensure the loyalty of every citizen, not only to France but more importantly to the revolution.

While this series of losses was eventually broken, the reality of what might have happened if they persisted hung over France. In September 1792, the French won a critical victory at Valmy, preventing an Austro-Prussian invasion. While the French military had stabilized and was producing victories by the time the Reign of Terror officially began, the pressure to succeed in this international struggle acted as justification for the government to pursue its actions. It was not until after the execution of Louis XVI and the annexation of the Rhineland that the other monarchies began to feel threatened enough to form the First Coalition. The coalition, consisting of Russia, Austria, Prussia, Spain, Holland, and Sardinia, began attacking France from all directions, besieging and capturing ports and retaking ground lost to France. With so many similarities to the first days of the Revolutionary Wars for the French government, with threats on all sides, unification of the country became a top priority. As the war continued and the Reign of Terror began, leaders saw a correlation between using terror and achieving victory. Well phrased by Albert Soboul, "terror, at first an improvised response to defeat, once organized became an instrument of victory." The threat of defeat and foreign invasion may have helped spur the origins of the Terror, but the timely coincidence of the Terror with French victories added justification to its growth.

=== Popular pressure ===
Heads of aristocrats on pikes.

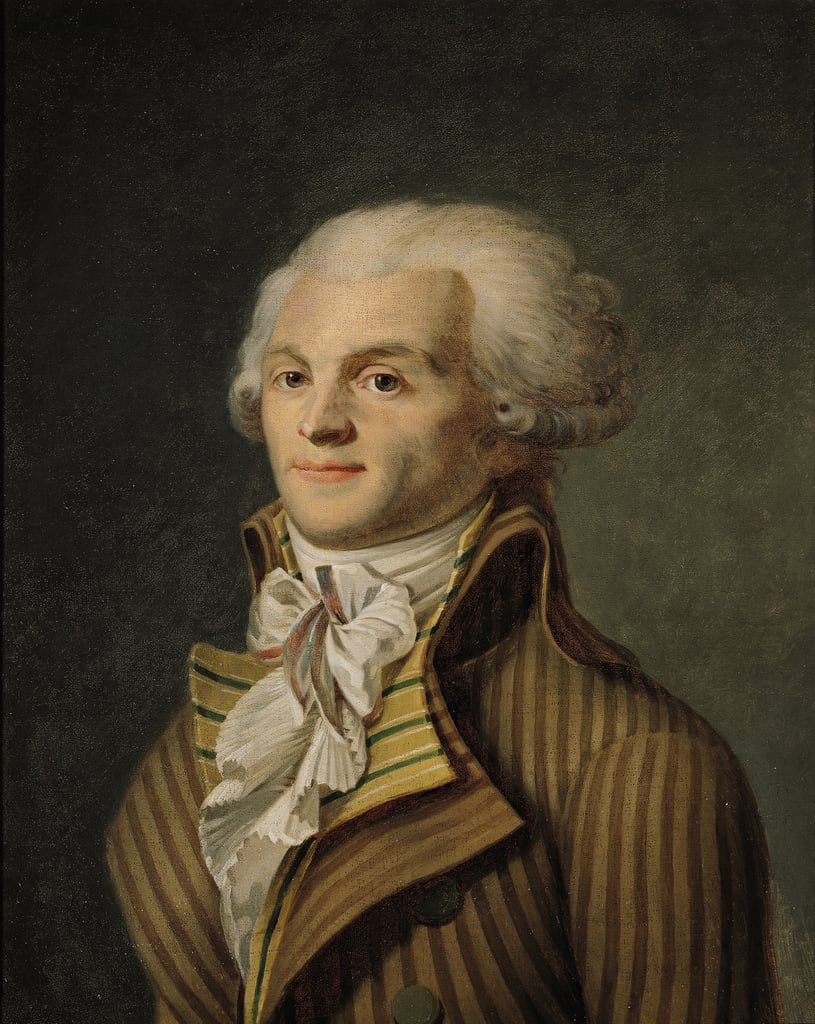
Maximilien Robespierre, member of the Committee of Public Safety

During the Reign of Terror, the sans-culottes —the urban workers of France— and the Hébertists put pressure on the National Convention delegates and contributed to the overall instability of France. The National Convention was bitterly split between the Montagnards and the Girondins. The Girondins were more conservative leaders of the National Convention, while the Montagnards supported radical violence and pressures of the lower classes. Once the Montagnards gained control of the National Convention, they began demanding radical measures.

Moreover, the sans-culottes agitated for leaders to inflict punishments on those who opposed the interests of the poor. The sans-culottes violently demonstrated, pushing their demands and creating constant pressure for the Montagnards to enact reform. They fed the frenzy of instability and chaos by utilizing popular pressure during the Revolution. For example, they sent letters and petitions to the Committee of Public Safety urging them to protect their interests and rights with measures such as taxation of foodstuffs that favored workers over the rich. They advocated for arrests of those deemed to oppose reforms against those with privilege, and the more militant members would advocate pillage in order to achieve the desired equality. The resulting instability caused problems that made forming the new republic and achieving full political support critical.

=== Religious upheaval ===
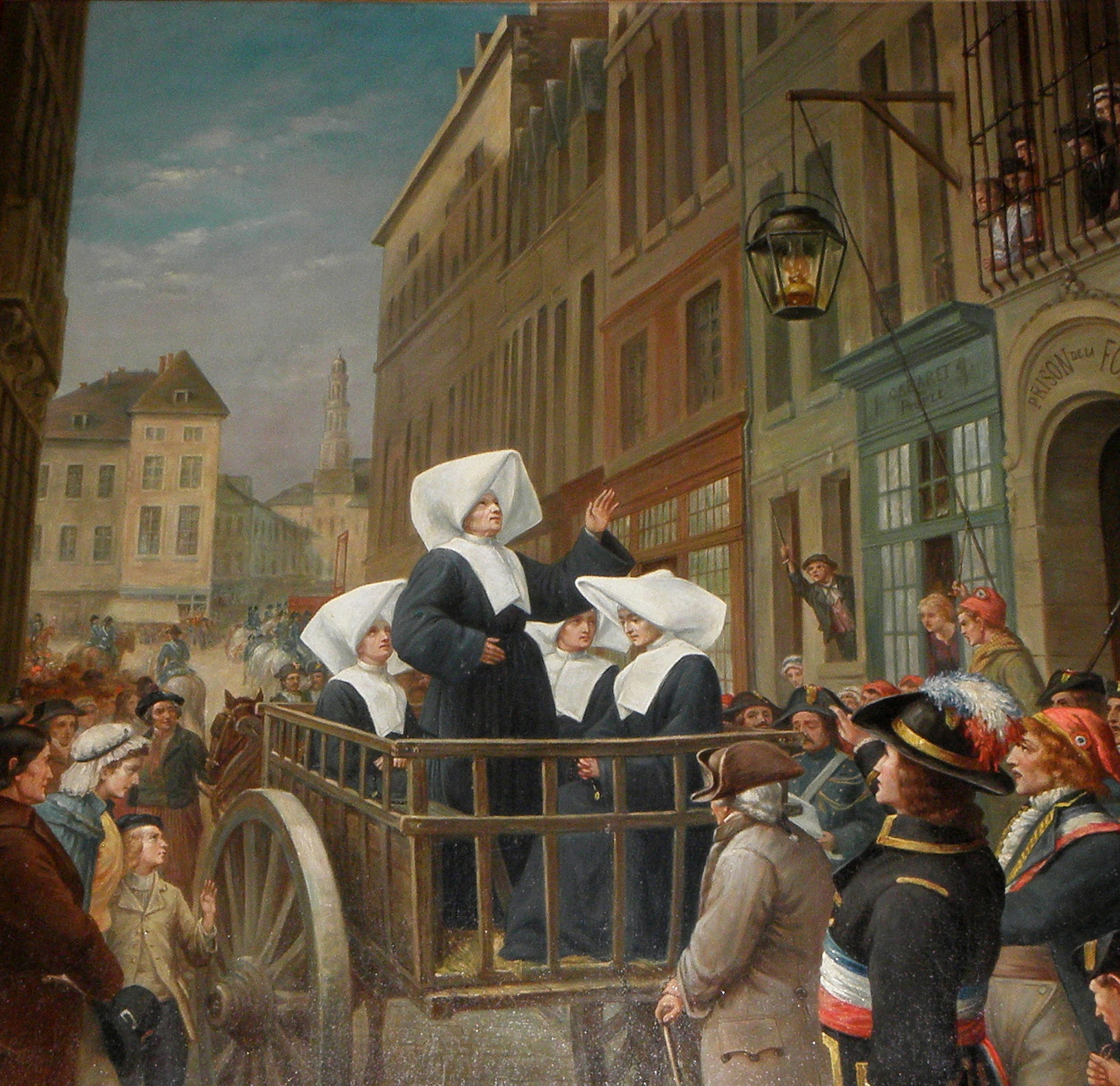
Nuns in a cart taking them to the guillotine in Cambrai on 26 June 1794

The Reign of Terror was characterized by a dramatic rejection of long-held religious authority, its hierarchical structure, and the corrupt and intolerant influence of the aristocracy and clergy. Religious elements that long stood as symbols of stability for the French people were replaced by views on reason and scientific thought. The radical revolutionaries and their supporters desired a cultural revolution that would rid the French state of all Christian influence. This process began with the fall of the monarchy, an event that effectively defrocked the state of its sanctification by the clergy via the doctrine of Divine Right and ushered in an era of reason.

Many long-held rights and powers were stripped from the Catholic Church and given to the state. In 1791, church lands were expropriated and priests killed or forced to leave France. Later in 1792, "refractory priests" were targeted and replaced with their secular counterpart from the Jacobin club. Not all religions experienced equal aggression; the Jewish community, on the contrary, received admittance into French citizenship in 1791. A Festival of Reason was held in the Notre Dame Cathedral, which was renamed "The Temple of Reason", and the traditional calendar was replaced with a new revolutionary one. The leaders of the Terror tried to address the call for these radical, revolutionary aspirations, while at the same time trying to maintain tight control on the de-Christianization movement that was threatening to the clear majority of the still-devoted Catholic population of France. Robespierre used the event as a means to combat the "moral counterrevolution" taking place among his rivals. Additionally, he hoped to stem "the monster atheism" that was a result of the radical secularization in philosophical and social circles. The tension sparked by these conflicting objectives laid a foundation for the "justified" use of terror to achieve revolutionary ideals and rid France of the religiosity that revolutionaries believed was standing in the way.

== Origin ==
In the summer of 1793, leading politicians in France felt a sense of emergency between the widespread civil war and counter-revolution. Bertrand Barère exclaimed on 5 September 1793 in the National Convention: "Let's make terror the order of the day!" This quote has frequently been interpreted as the beginning of a "system of Terror". Under the pressure of the radical sans-culottes, the convention agreed to institute a revolutionary army but refused to make terror the order of the day. According to French historian Jean-Clément Martin, there was no "system of terror" instated by the convention between 1793 and 1794, despite the pressure from some of its members and the sans-culottes. The members of the convention were determined to avoid street violence such as the September Massacres of 1792 by taking violence into their own hands as an instrument of government. The monarchist Jacques Cazotte who predicted the Terror was Guillotined at the end of the month.

What Maximilien Robespierre called "terror" was the fear that the "justice of exception" would inspire the enemies of the French First Republic. He opposed the idea of terror as the order of the day, defending instead "justice" as the order of the day. In February 1794 in a speech he explains why this "terror" was necessary as a form of exceptional justice in the context of the revolutionary government:

If the basis of popular government in peacetime is virtue, the basis of popular government during a revolution is both virtue and terror; virtue, without which terror is baneful; terror, without which virtue is powerless. Terror is nothing more than speedy, severe and inflexible justice; it is thus an emanation of virtue; it is less a principle in itself, than a consequence of the general principle of democracy, applied to the most pressing needs of the patrie [homeland, fatherland].

Marxist historian Albert Mathiez argues that such terror was a necessary reaction to the circumstances. Others suggest there were additional causes, both ideological and emotional.

== Major events ==
On 10 March 1793, the National Convention set up the Revolutionary Tribunal. Among those charged by the tribunal, initially, about half of those arrested were acquitted, but the number dropped to about a quarter after the enactment of the Law of 22 Prairial on 10 June 1794. In March, rebellion broke out in the Vendée in response to mass conscription, which developed into a civil war. Discontent in the Vendée lasted—according to some accounts—until after the Terror.

On 6 April 1793, the National Convention established the Committee of Public Safety, which gradually became the de facto war-time government of France. The Committee oversaw the Reign of Terror. "During the Reign of Terror, at least 300,000 suspects were arrested; 17,000 were officially executed, and perhaps 10,000 died in prison or without trial."

On 2 June, the Parisian Sans-culottes surrounded the National Convention, calling for administrative and political purges, a fixed low price for bread, and a limitation of the electoral franchise to sans-culottes alone. With the backing of the national guard, they persuaded the convention to arrest 29 Girondist leaders. In reaction to the imprisonment of the Girondin deputies, some 13 departments started the Federalist revolts against the convention, which were ultimately crushed.

On 24 June, the convention adopted the first republican constitution of France, the French Constitution of 1793. It was ratified by public referendum, but never put into force. On 13 July, the assassination of Jean-Paul Marat—a Jacobin leader and journalist—resulted in a further increase in Jacobin political influence. Georges Danton, the leader of the August 1792 uprising against the king, was removed from the Committee of Public Safety on 10 July. On 27 July, Robespierre became part of the Committee of Public Safety.

On 23 August, the National Convention decreed the levée en masse:

The young men shall fight; the married man shall forge arms and transport provisions; the women shall make tents and clothes and shall serve in the hospitals; the children shall pick rags to lint [for bandages]; the old men shall betake themselves to the public square in order to arouse the courage of the warriors and preach hatred of kings and the unity of the Republic. (Note: (In French) Les jeunes gens iront au combat; les hommes mariés forgeront les armes et transporteront les subsistances; les femmes feront des tentes et serviront dans les hôpitaux; les enfants mettront le vieux linge en charpie; les vieillards se feront porter sur les places publiques pour exciter le courage des guerriers, prêcher la haine des rois et l'unité de la République.)

On 5 September, on the proposal of Barère, the convention was supposed to have declared by vote that "terror is the order of the day". On that day's session, the convention, upon a proposal by Pierre Gaspard Chaumette and supported by Billaud and Danton, decided to form a revolutionary army of 6,000 men in Paris. Barère, representing the Committee of Public Safety, introduced a decree that was promptly passed, establishing a paid armed force of 6,000 men and 1,200 gunners "tasked with crushing counter-revolutionaries, enforcing revolutionary laws and public safety measures decreed by the National Convention, and safeguarding provisions." This allowed the government to form "revolutionary armies" designed to force French citizens into compliance with Maximilian rule. These armies were also used to enforce "the law of the General Maximum", which controlled the distribution and pricing of food. Addressing the convention, Robespierre claimed that the "weight and willpower" of the people loyal to the republic would be used to oppress those who would turn "political gatherings into gladiatorial arenas". The policy change unleashed a newfound military power in France, which was used to defend against the future coalitions formed by rival nations. The event also solidified Robespierre's rise to power as president of the Committee of Public Safety earlier in July.

On 8 September, banks and exchange offices were shuttered to curb the circulation of counterfeit assignats and the outflow of capital, with investments in foreign countries punishable by death. The following day, the extremists Jean-Marie Collot d'Herbois and Jacques-Nicolas Billaud-Varenne were elected in the Committee of Public Safety. On 9 September the convention established paramilitary forces, the "revolutionary armies", to force farmers to surrender grain demanded by the government. On 17 September, the Law of Suspects was passed, which authorized the imprisonment of vaguely defined "suspects". This created a mass overflow in the prison systems. On 29 September the convention extended price fixing from grain and bread to other essential goods and also fixed wages.

On 10 October, the convention decreed "the provisional government shall be revolutionary until peace." On 16 October Marie Antoinette was executed. The trial of the Girondins started on the same day; they were executed on 31 October in just over half an hour by Charles-Henri Sanson. Joseph Fouché and Collot d'Herbois suppressed the revolt of Lyon against the National Convention, while Jean-Baptiste Carrier ordered the drownings at Nantes. Jean-Lambert Tallien ensured the operation of the guillotine in Bordeaux, while Barras and Fréron addressed issues in Marseille and Toulon. Joseph Le Bon was sent to the Somme and Pas-de-Calais regions.

On 8 November, the director of the assignats manufacture, and Manon Roland were executed. On 13 November, the convention shut down the Paris Bourse and banned all commerce in precious metals, under penalties. Anti-clerical sentiments increased and a campaign of dechristianization occurred at the end of 1793. Eventually, Robespierre denounced the "de-Christianisers" as foreign enemies.

In early December, Robespierre accused Danton in the Jacobin Club of "too often showing his vices and not his virtue". Camille Desmoulins defended Danton and warned Robespierre not to exaggerate the revolution. On 5 December, the National Convention passed the Law of Frimaire, which gave the central government more control over the actions of the representatives on mission. The Commune of Paris and the revolutionary committees in the sections had to obey the law, the two Committees, and the convention. Desmoulins argued that the Revolution should return to its original ideas en vogue around 10 August 1792. A Committee of Grace had to be established. On 8 December, Madame du Barry was guillotined. On receiving notice that he was to appear on the next day before the Revolutionary Tribunal, Étienne Clavière committed suicide. American Thomas Paine lost his seat in the convention, was arrested, and locked up for his association with the Girondins, as well as being a foreign national. By the end of 1793, two major factions had emerged, both threatening the revolutionary government: the Hébertists, who called for an intensification of the Terror and threatened insurrection, and the Dantonists, led by Danton, who demanded moderation and clemency. The Committee of Public Safety took actions against both.

On 8 February 1794, Carrier was recalled from Nantes after a member of the Committee of Public Safety wrote to Robespierre with information about the atrocities being carried out, although Carrier was not put on trial. On 26 February and 3 March, Louis Antoine de Saint-Just proposed decrees to confiscate the property of exiles and opponents of the revolution, known as the Ventôse Decrees.

In March, the major Hébertists were tried before the Revolutionary Tribunal and executed on 24 March. On 30 March, the two committees decided to arrest Danton and Desmoulins after Saint-Just became uncharacteristically angry. The Dantonists were tried on 3 to 5 April and executed on 5 April. In mid-April it was decreed to centralise the investigation of court records and to bring all the political suspects in France to the Revolutionary Tribunal to Paris. Saint-Just and Philippe-François-Joseph Le Bas journeyed the Rhine Army to oversee the generals and punish officers for perceived treasonous timidity or lack of initiative. The two committees received the power to interrogate them immediately. A special police bureau inside the Comité de salut public was created, whose task was to monitor public servants, competing with both the Committee of General Security and the Committee of Public Safety. Foreigners were no longer allowed to travel through France or visit a Jacobin club; Dutch patriots who had fled to France before 1790 were excluded.

On 22 April, Guillaume-Chrétien de Lamoignon de Malesherbes, Isaac René Guy le Chapelier, Jacques Guillaume Thouret were taken to be executed. Saint-Just and Le Bas left Paris at the end of the month for the army in the north. On 21 May, the revolutionary government decided that the Terror would be centralised, with almost all the tribunals in the provinces closed and all the trials held in Paris. On 20 May, Robespierre signed Theresa Cabarrus's arrest warrant, and on 23 May, following an attempted assassination on d'Herbois. Cécile Renault was arrested near Robespierre's residence with two penknives and a change of underwear claiming the fresh linen was for her execution. She was executed on 17 June.

On 10 June, the National Convention passed a law proposed by Georges Couthon, known as the Law of 22 Prairial, which simplified the judicial process and greatly accelerated the work of the Revolutionary Tribunal. With the enactment of the law, the number of executions greatly increased, and the period became known as "The Great Terror" (French: la Grande Terreur). Between 10 June and 27 July, another 1,366 were executed, causing fear among d'Herbois, Fouché and Tallien due to their past actions. Like Brissot, Madame Roland, Pétion, Hébert, and Danton, Tallien was accused of participating in conspicuous dinners. On 18 June, Pétion de Villeneuve and François Buzot committed suicide, and Joachim Vilate was arrested on 21 June.

On 26 June, the French army won the Battle of Fleurus, which marked a turning point in France's military campaign and undermined the necessity of wartime measures and the legitimacy of the revolutionary government. In early July, about 60 individuals were arrested as "enemies of the people" and accused of conspiring against liberty. The total of death sentences in Paris in July was more than double the number in June, with two new mass graves dug at Picpus Cemetery by mid-July. There was widespread agreement among deputies that their parliamentary immunity, in place since 1 April 1793, had become perilous. On 14 July, Robespierre had Fouché expelled. To evade arrest about 50 deputies avoided staying at home.

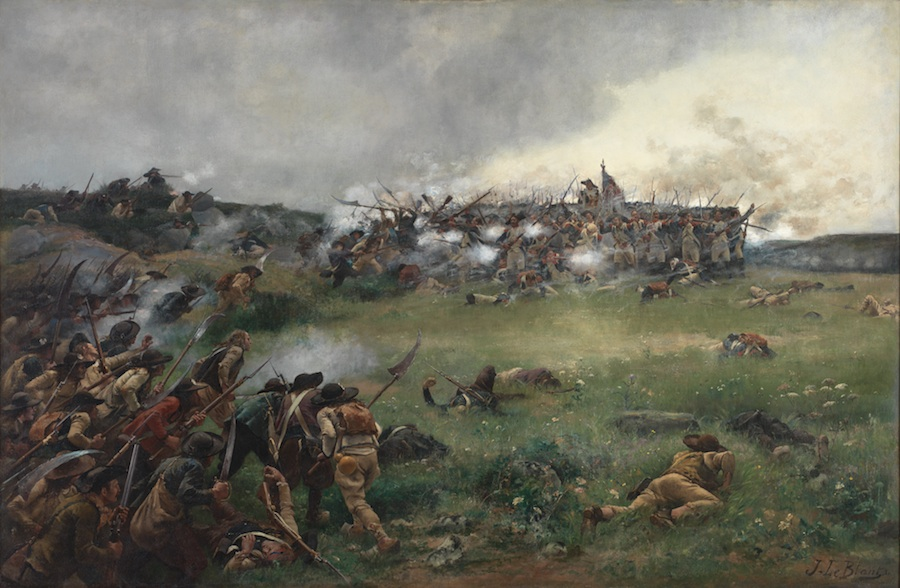
The Vendeans revolted against the revolutionary government in 1793

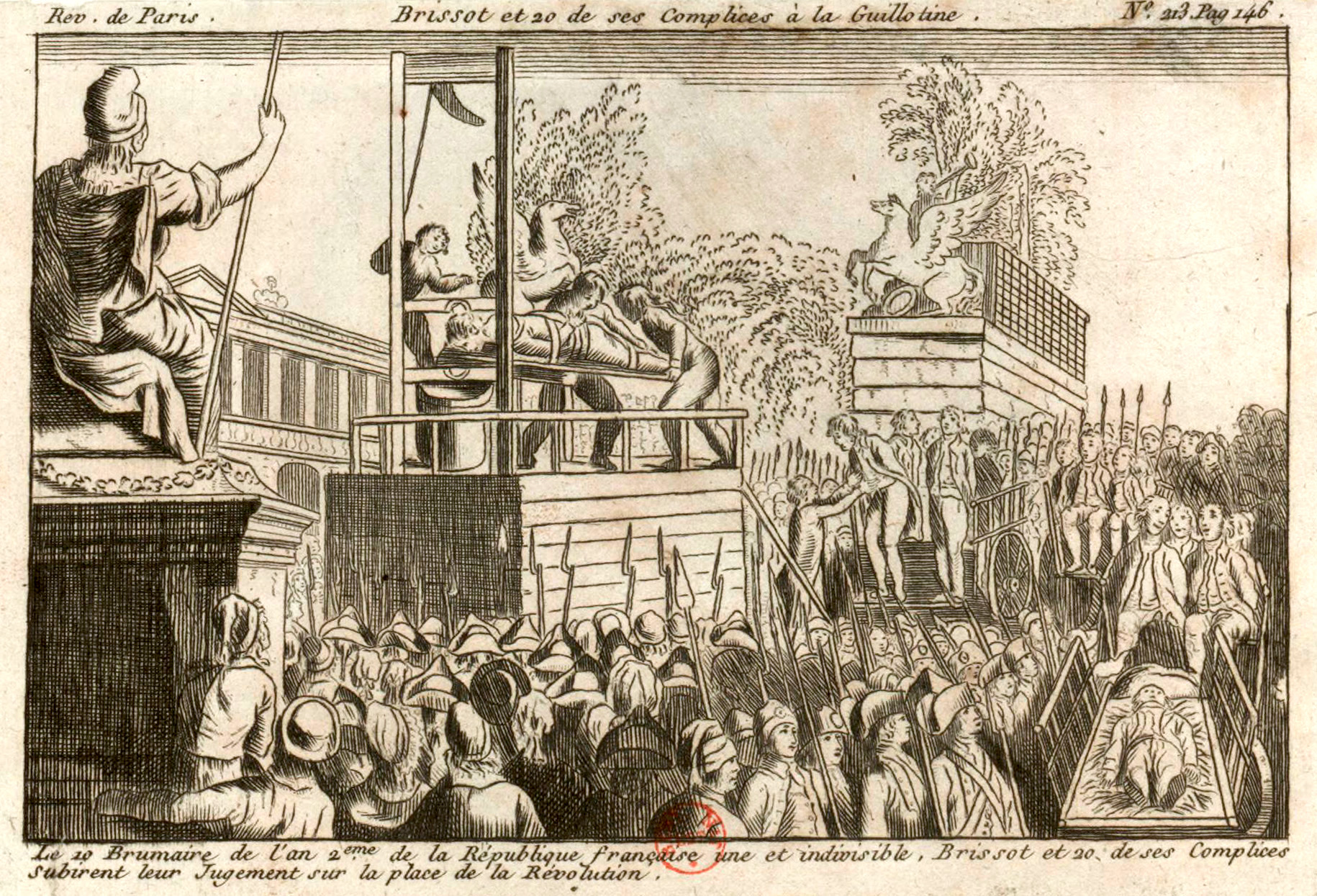
The execution of the Girondins

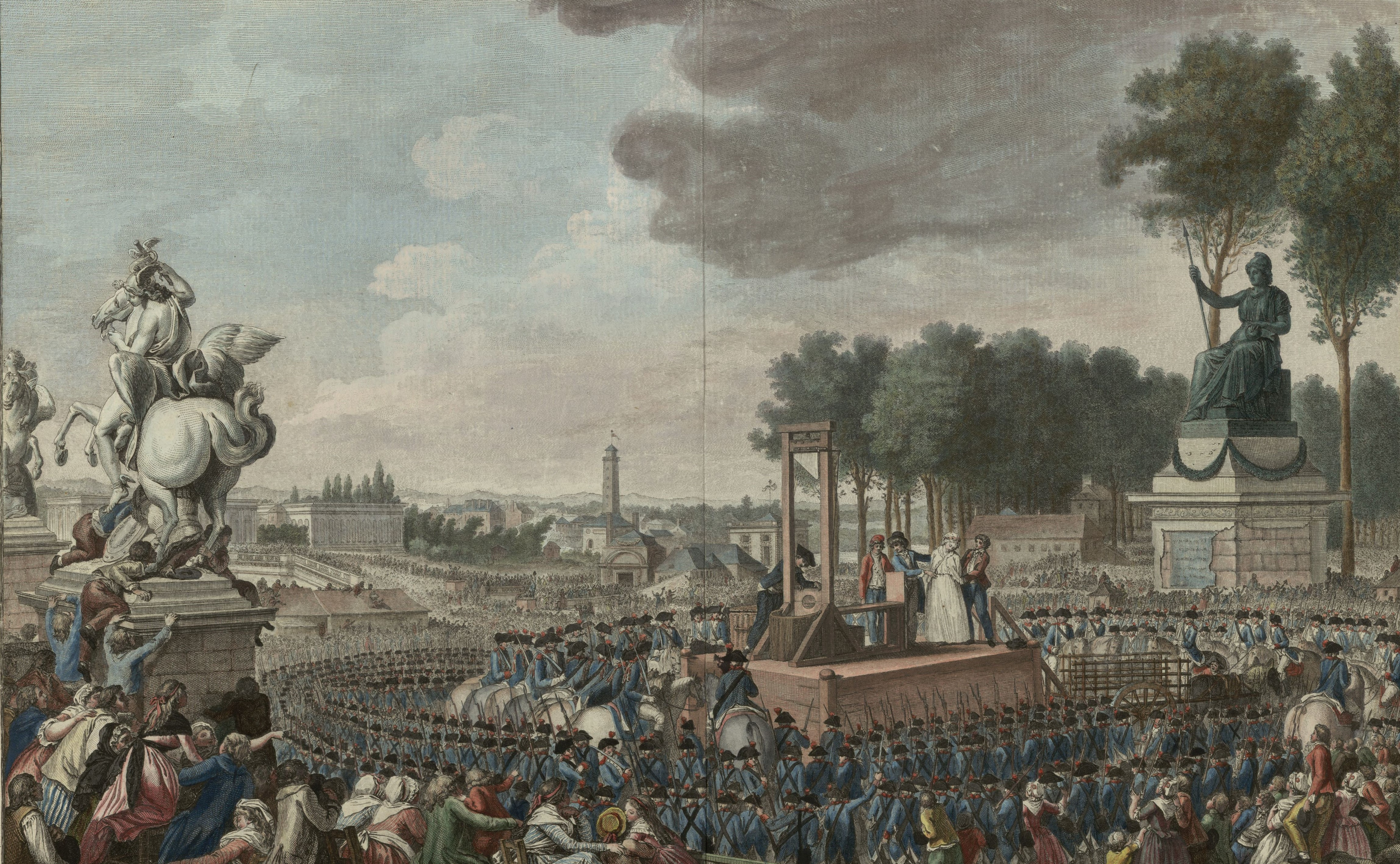
Marie Antoinette's execution by guillotine on 16 October 1793

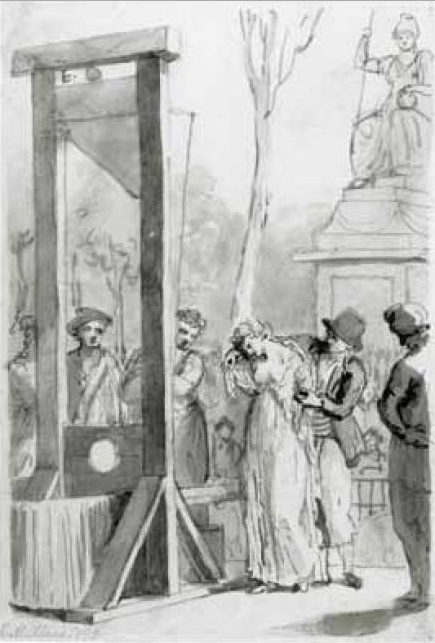
The execution of Olympe de Gouges, feminist writer close to the Girondins

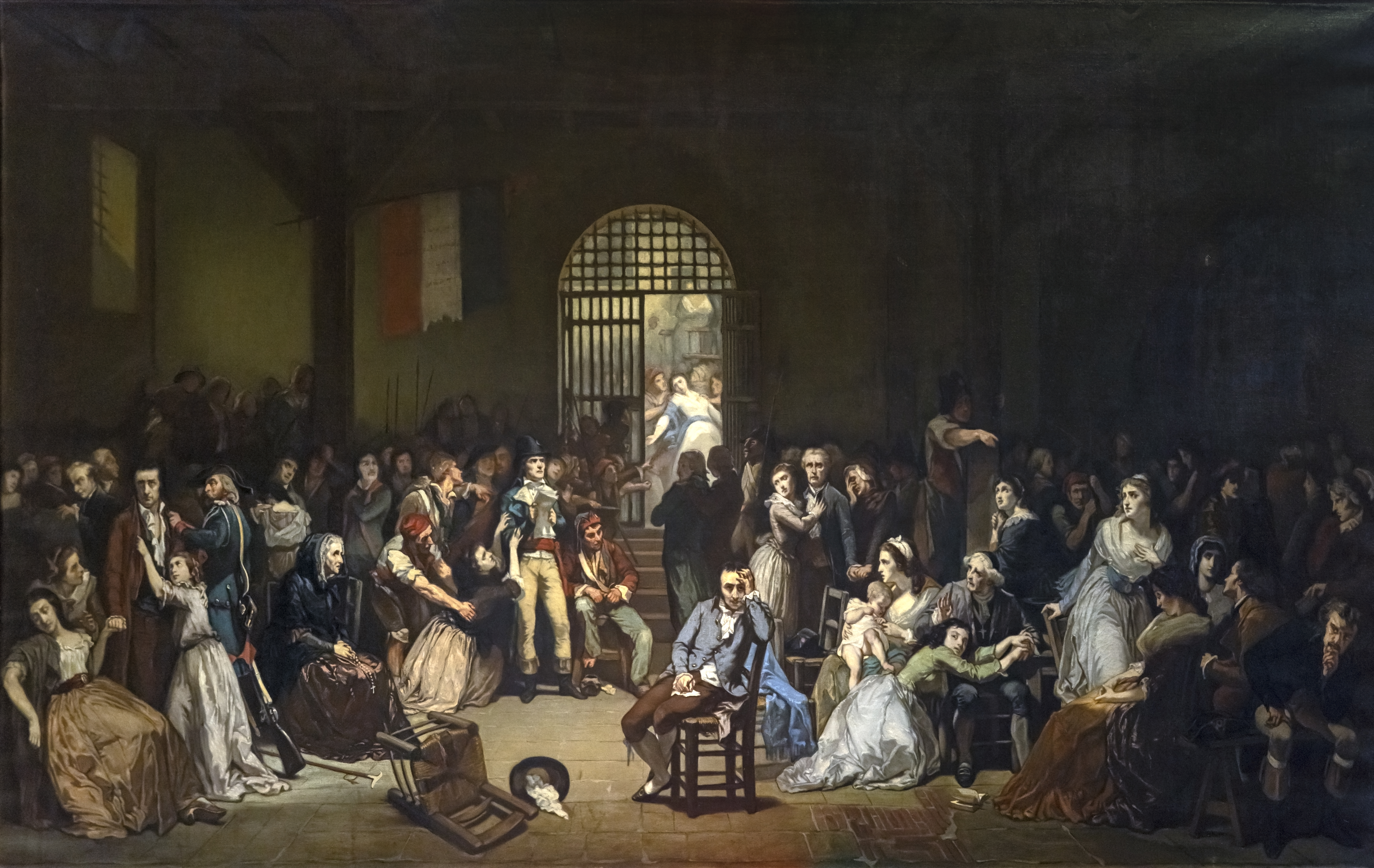
Calling out the last victims of the terror at Saint-Lazare Prison, July 1794

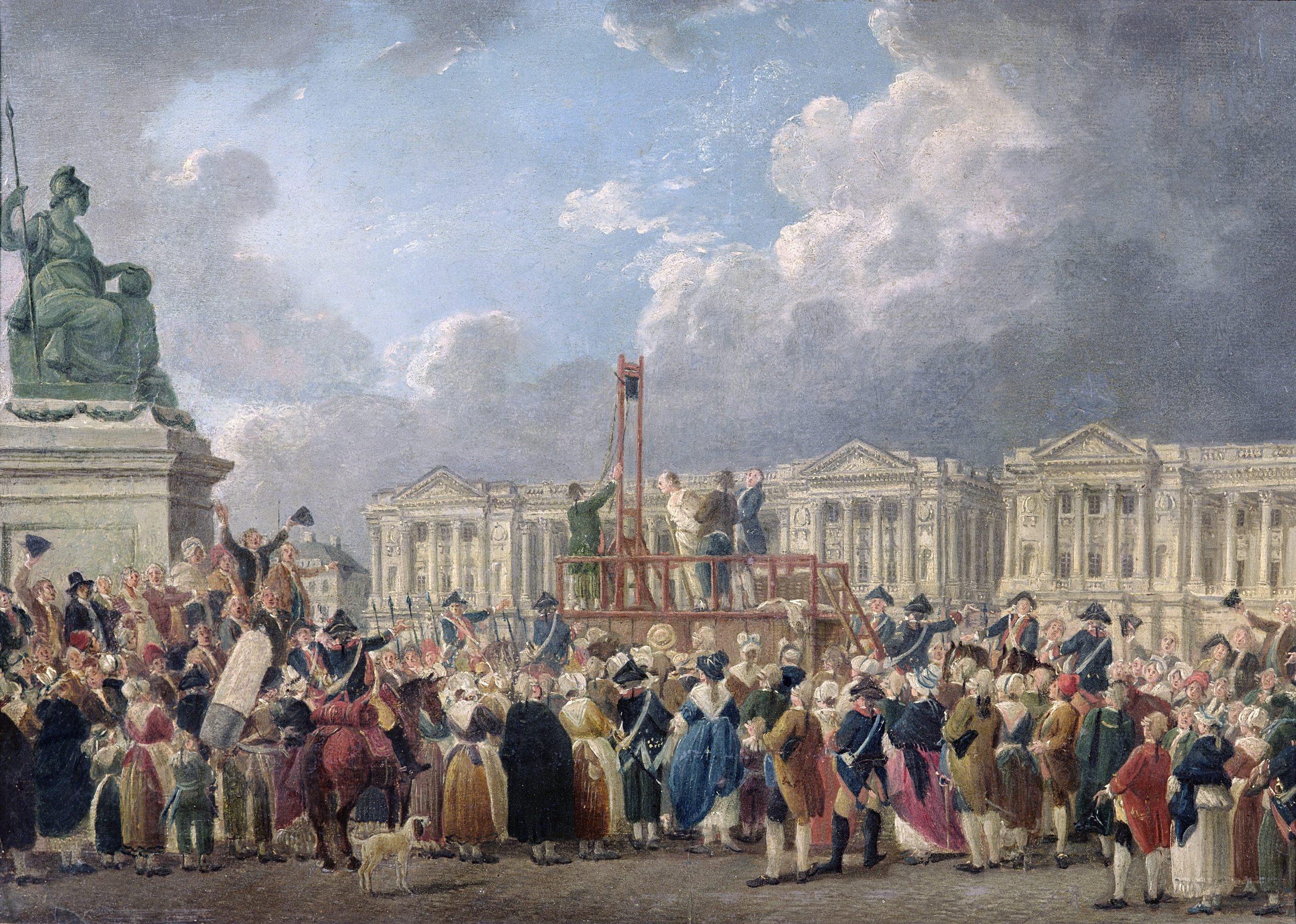
Execution on the future Place de la Concorde

== Thermidorian Reaction ==
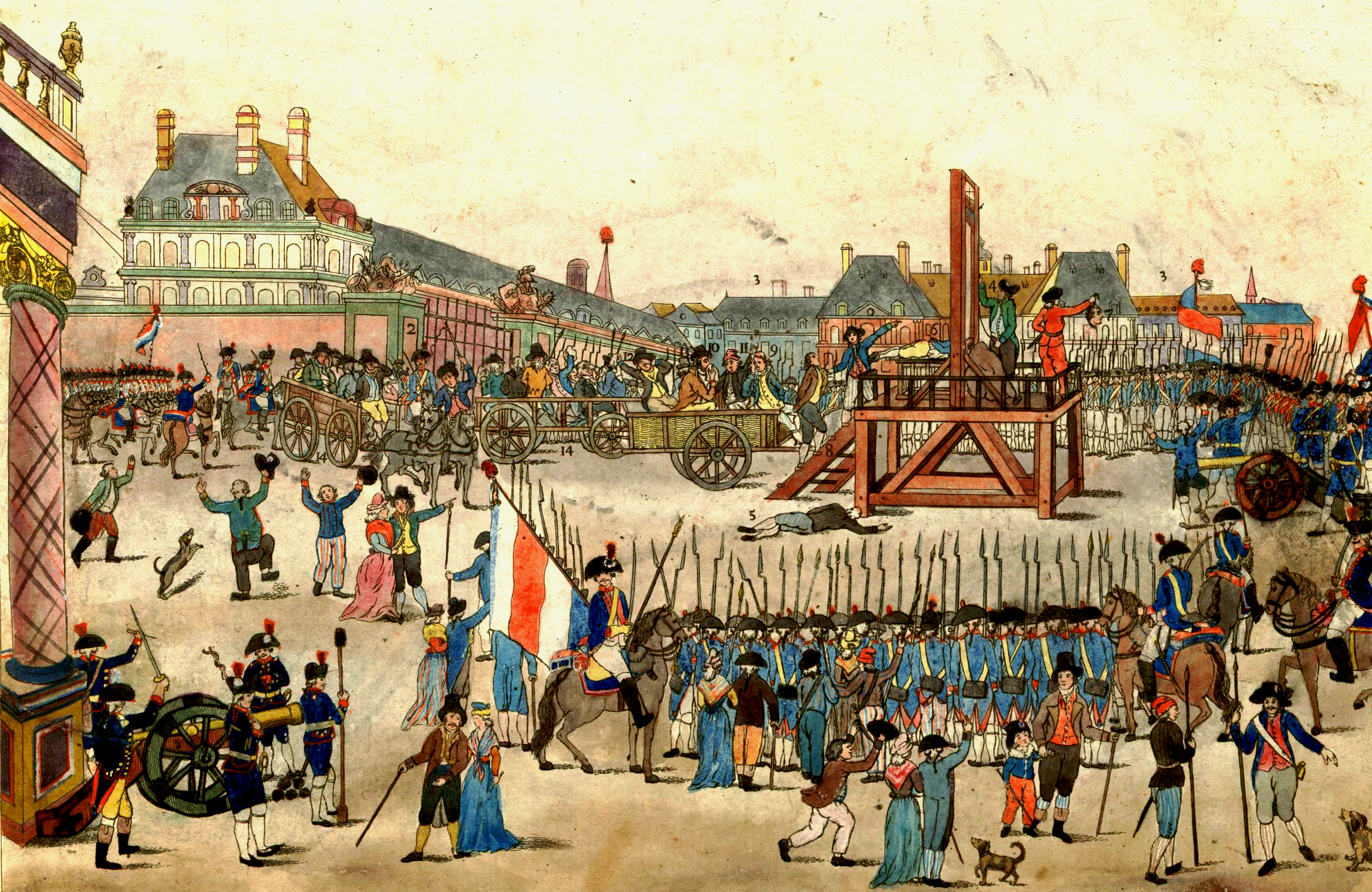
The execution of Maximilien Robespierre

The fall of Robespierre was brought about by a combination of those who wanted more power for the Committee of Public Safety (and a more radical policy than he was willing to allow) and the moderates who completely opposed the revolutionary government. They had, between them, made the Law of 22 Prairial one of the charges against him, so that after his fall, to advocate terror would be seen as adopting the policy of a convicted enemy of the republic, putting the advocate's own head at risk.

Between his arrest and his execution, Robespierre may have tried to commit suicide by shooting himself, although the bullet wound he sustained, whatever its origin, only shattered his jaw. Alternatively, he may have been shot by the gendarme Charles-André Merda. According to Bourdon, Méda then hit Couthon's adjutant in his leg. Couthon was found lying at the bottom of a staircase in a corner, having fallen from the back of his adjutant. Saint-Just gave himself up without a word. According to Méda, Hanriot tried to escape by a concealed staircase to the third floor and his apartment. The great confusion that arose during the storming of the municipal Hall of Paris, where Robespierre and his friends had found refuge, makes it impossible to be sure of the wound's origin. A group of 15 to 20 conspirators were locked up in a room inside the Hôtel de Ville. In any case, Robespierre was guillotined the next day, together with Saint-Just, Couthon and his brother Augustin Robespierre. The day following his demise, approximately half of the Paris Commune (70 members) met their fate at the guillotine.

According to Barère, who just like Robespierre never went on mission: "We did not deceive ourselves that Saint-Just, cut out as a more dictatorial boss, would have finished by overthrowing [Robespierre] to put himself in his place; we also knew that we who stood in the way of his projects, he would have us guillotined; we overthrew him."

== See also ==
- Bals des victimes
- Infernal columns
- Revolutionary terror
- State terrorism
- Terrorism in France
- Tricoteuse
