= Ventôse Decrees =

Legislation proposed by Louis de Saint-Just

The Ventôse Decrees were decrees proposed on February 26 and March 3, 1794 (8 and 13 Ventôse, An II in the French Republican Calendar) by the French revolutionary leader Louis de Saint-Just. Saint-Just proposed to confiscate the property of exiles and opponents of the Revolution, and redistribute it to the needy. Saint-Just and other radicals argued that the enemies of the revolution had forfeited their civil rights, including the right to own property.

Robespierre supported the Decrees in theory, but realized that he lacked the support to implement them, and efforts to enforce the Decrees ended within a few months.
