= Maurille de Sombreuil =

French aristocrat (1767–1823)

- Comtesse
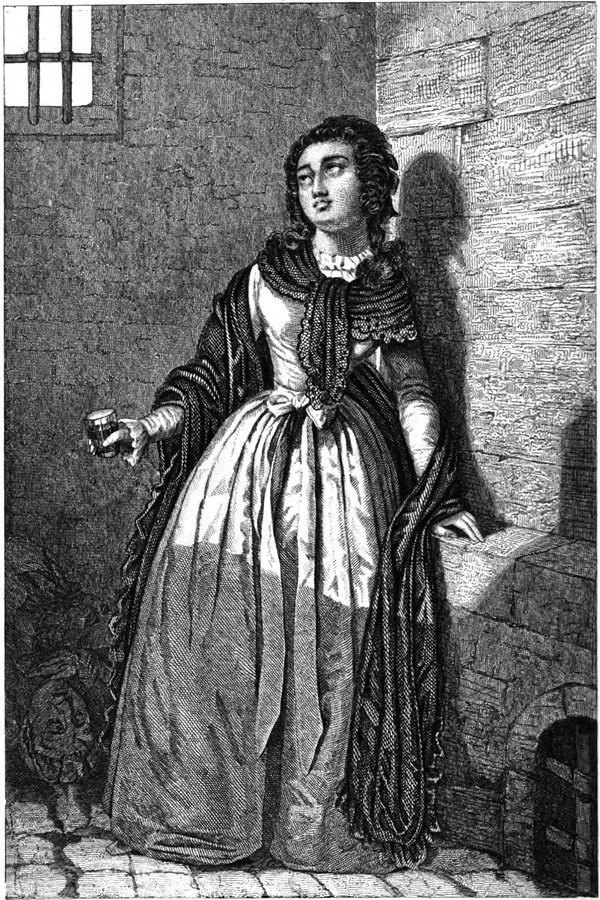
- Maurille de Sombreuil holding a glass of blood
- Full name: Jeanne-Jacques-Marie-Anne-Françoise de Virot de Sombreuil
- Known for: Drinking a glass of blood to save her father's life, according to legend
- Born: 1767 (Note: Her exact birth date is unknown, and her baptism was recorded on 14 February 1768. A historian from Limousin, M. Louis Guibert, estimated that she was born around October or November 1767 for several reasons, including the fact that her younger brother was born on 23 September 1768. Paul-Victor Duchemin noted in his biography of Sombreuil that this estimate was reasonable.); Bonnac-la-Côte, Haute-Vienne, Kingdom of France
- Baptised: 14 February 1768
- Died: 15 May 1823 (aged 55–56); Avignon, France
- Father: Charles François de Virot de Sombreuil

Maurille de Sombreuil, also referred to as Marie-Maurille de Sombreuil or Mademoiselle de Sombreuil (1767 – 15 May 1823), was a French comtesse and daughter of Charles François de Virot de Sombreuil. Sombreuil and her father were imprisoned at Prison de l'Abbaye during the September Massacres in 1792, and her father was almost executed by the crowd. According to legend, Sombreuil made a deal with the septembriseurs to drink a glass of blood in exchange for her father's life. Other versions of the story say that she merely drank a glass of wine stained with blood. Still, she became known as the "l'héroïne au verre de sang" or "the heroine of the glass of blood", and the legend of her bravery inspired poetry and art.

During the Reign of Terror in 1793, Sombreuil's father and brother Stanislas were arrested. Accused of counter-revolutionary activity, they were convicted alongside 52 other defendants and guillotined while being made to wear the "robe rouge", or red robe, of "assassins". Without the support of her family, Sombreuil struggled financially and ultimately had to sell her family's château. She married her cousin Count Charles de Villelume, an émigré, and lived in exile in England and Germany until they were eventually able to return to France. After she died, her heart was transferred to the Musée de l'Armée in Les Invalides and displayed in a funeral urn.

== Biography ==
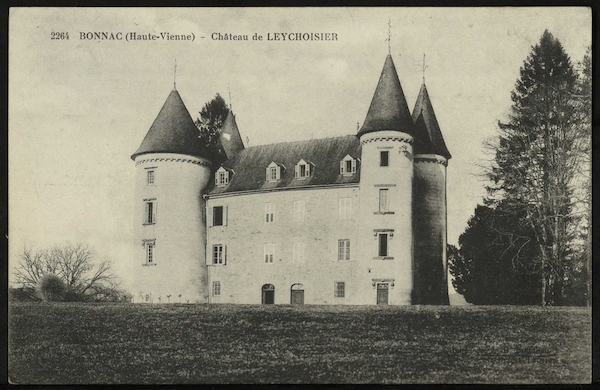
Maurille de Sombreuil's birthplace: Château de Leychoisier, Bonnac-la-Côte

=== Early life ===
Maurille de Sombreuil was born in the autumn of 1767 at Château de Leychoisier in Bonnac-la-Côte. She was baptized as Jeanne-Jacques-Marie-Anne-Françoise on 14 February 1768. However, her family preferred to call her Maurille, after her godfather. Her father Charles François de Virot de Sombreuil was a general under Louis XVI and governor of Les Invalides in the 7th arrondissement of Paris, and her mother was Marie-Magdeleine des Flottes de Leychoisier. She had two younger brothers: Stanislas de Virot de Sombreuil (born 1768) and Charles Eugène (born 1770).

=== Heroine of the glass of blood (1792) ===
On 16 August 1792, Sombreuil's father Charles François de Virot was arrested for participating in the defense of Tuileries Palace and imprisoned in the Prison de l'Abbaye. Fearing for the health of her elderly father, she requested and was granted permission to be jailed alongside him. A legendized portrayal of Sombreuil's ordeal, The Female Revolutionary Plutarch, asserts that Jean-Paul Marat wrote on her petition: "Confine this aristocratical fanatic with her aristocratical father."

Sombreuil and her father remained in the Prison de l'Abbaye until the September Massacres began on 2 September and crowds started seizing prisoners and executing them. When Sombreuil's father was brought forward to be condemned, she threw herself at the crowds' feet and begged them to spare him. One account states that, at the moment she intervened, her father was going to be transferred to La Force Prison, while another claims that she blocked her father from the crowds' swords and was wounded during the struggle.

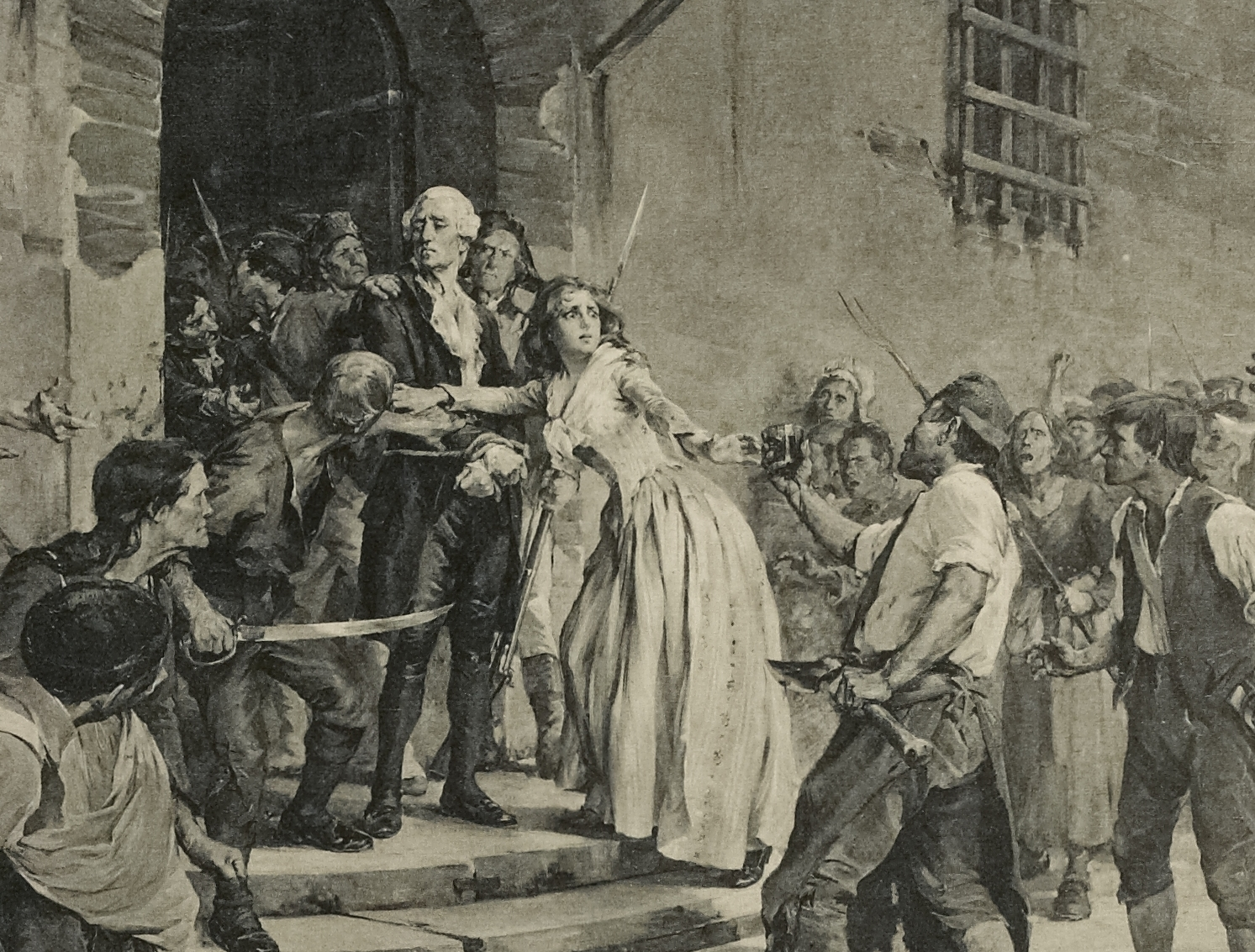
Engraving of Maurille de Sombreuil being compelled to drink a glass of blood.

According to legend, a man in the crowd held out a glass of blood and agreed to spare her father if she drank it. As soon as she drank the contents of the glass, the legend says that the crowd cheered and dropped their weapons. Thereafter, she was referred to as "l'héroïne au verre de sang" or "the heroine of the glass of blood", and her story inspired artists and writers, including Jacques Delille and Victor Hugo.

However, Sombreuil said that the story of the glass of blood was an exaggeration. Rather than drink a glass of blood, she was asked to drink a glass of wine and toast "the health of the nation". In his biography of Sombreuil, Duchemin wrote that her version of events would vary from drinking a glass full of blood or one full of wine. Moreover, one of her direct descendants said that story of the glass of blood was understood within the family to be a legend. Duchemin also quoted the grandson of someone who knew Sombreuil in 1799 as saying that Sombreuil believed it was "un verre de vin taché de sang", or "a glass of wine stained with blood" but was never certain what she had been asked to drink.

After returning home from prison, Sombreuil was overwhelmed by a "violent délire" (transl. "violent delirium") that lasted for several days, in which she convulsed and bit her tongue so hard that her mouth filled with blood. Her biographers Christophe and Duchemin assert she had epilepsy. Her father summoned a celebrity doctor named Philippe-Jean Pelletan from Hôtel-Dieu to treat her, but Pelletan's prognosis was that she would live with the condition for the rest of her life. In her letters, the painter Élisabeth Vigée Le Brun said that Sombreuil also suffered from vomiting episodes at the mere sight of something red.

=== Imprisonment and marriage ===
The Law of Suspects passed on 17 September 1793 and allowed for the arrest of several categories of suspected enemies of the Revolution, including émigrés and "those who, by their conduct, relations or language spoken or written, [had] shown themselves partisans of tyranny or federalism and enemies of liberty". Sombreuil and her family were likely targeted because her youngest brother, Charles, was considered an émigré and had taken up arms to fight alongside the Prussians and against the Revolutionary government in Mayenne. Her eldest brother, Stanislas, was arrested on the same day the law passed, and then Sombreuil and her father were arrested a few days later on 20 September. Stanislas and her father were ultimately imprisoned in La Force Prison together.

Sombreuil wrote a plea to the accusateur public, Fouquier-Tinville, and asked for mercy for Stanislas and her father, but Duchemin notes that their guilt had already been decided in advance. On 17 June 1794, the Revolutionary Tribunal prosecuted 54 total suspects, including Sombreuil's father, eldest brother, and other figures like Cécile Renault and Madame de Sainte-Amaranthe. They were all quickly convicted. By decree of the Convention, they were guillotined wearing the "robe rouge", or red robe, of "assassins". The judgement against her father and brother read:

"Sombreuil, complice du Tyran et son fils, associés à ses haines liberticides, devoient nécessairement être comptés au nombre des coopérateurs de ce cystème (sic) de contre-révolution"
"[The father] Sombreuil, accomplice of the Tyrant, and his son [Stanislas], associate in his liberty-destroying hatreds, were necessary to be counted as collaborators in this system of counter-revolution."

Sombreuil, herself detained in Port-Libre prison, (Note: The Port-Royal Abbey in Paris was repurposed as a prison called "Port-Libre" or "prison de la Bourbe" during the Reign of Terror.) was released on 23 August 1794. Her property, including her family's Leychoisier estate, had been confiscated by law after her family was prosecuted by the Tribunal. Her finances were depleted, and her health was significantly deteriorated.

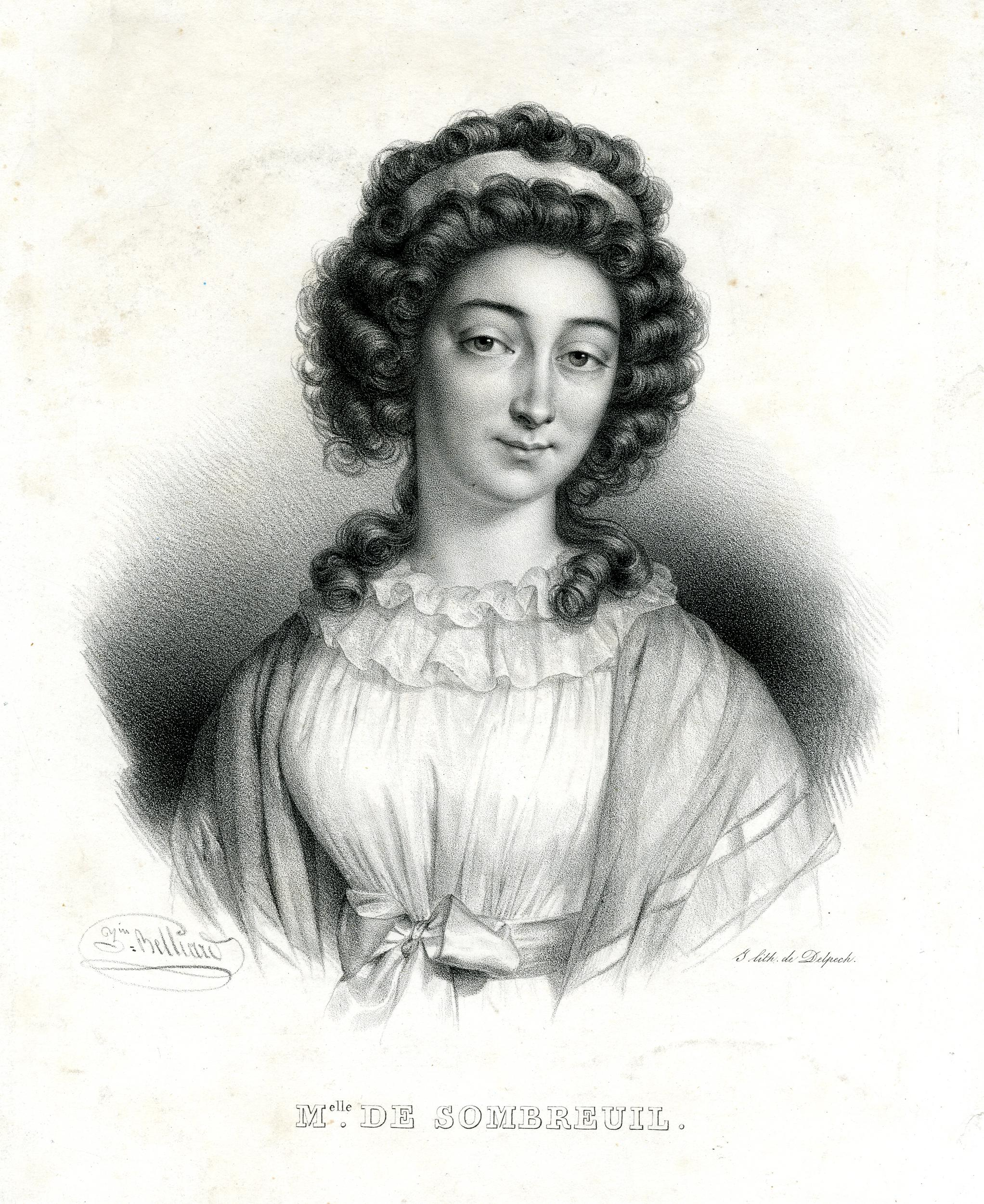
19th-century portrait of Sombreuil

In May 1795, Sombreuil applied to the government to restore her assets, but the process was very difficult. The matter of her inheritance was further complicated by her youngest brother, Charles, who was an émigré fighting against the Republic, and, therefore, his portion of the estate was forfeit to the government. On 28 September 1795, two weeks after Charles died, a ruling was reached. Her biographer Robert Christophe writes that she received two-thirds of the Leychoisier estate, though the official decree said she retained one-third of her father's estate and one-half of Stanislas' share of the same. In the ruling, the government also admitted that her father and eldest brother had been "inhumainement assassinés" (transl. "inhumanely murdered") by the Revolutionary Tribunal of 2 Prairial, Year II. The decree also acknowledged her "piété filiale" (transl. "filial piety") and courage back in September 1792, when she saved her father's life.

Sometime after this, her cousin Count Charles de Villelume proposed to her. The exact date of their wedding is unknown. Her biographer Duchemin writes that there are competing versions of the story of their marriage. In one version, the Count traveled to France to marry Sombreuil in a secret "sombre souterrain", or dark underground, ceremony; as an émigré, he risked being arrested by the revolutionary authorities. Records indicate that she was married by the time she sold Château de Leychoisier in 1797, in an effort to ease her financial struggles.

=== Exile and death ===
Sombreuil lived in exile in London and then in Germany with her husband. Both Sombreuil and her husband later returned to France, and she died on 15 May 1823 in Avignon. She is buried at Cimetière Saint-Véran. In 1851, her heart was transferred to the Musée de l'Armée in Les Invalides, where it remains on display in a funeral urn.

== Legacy ==
=== Rose ===
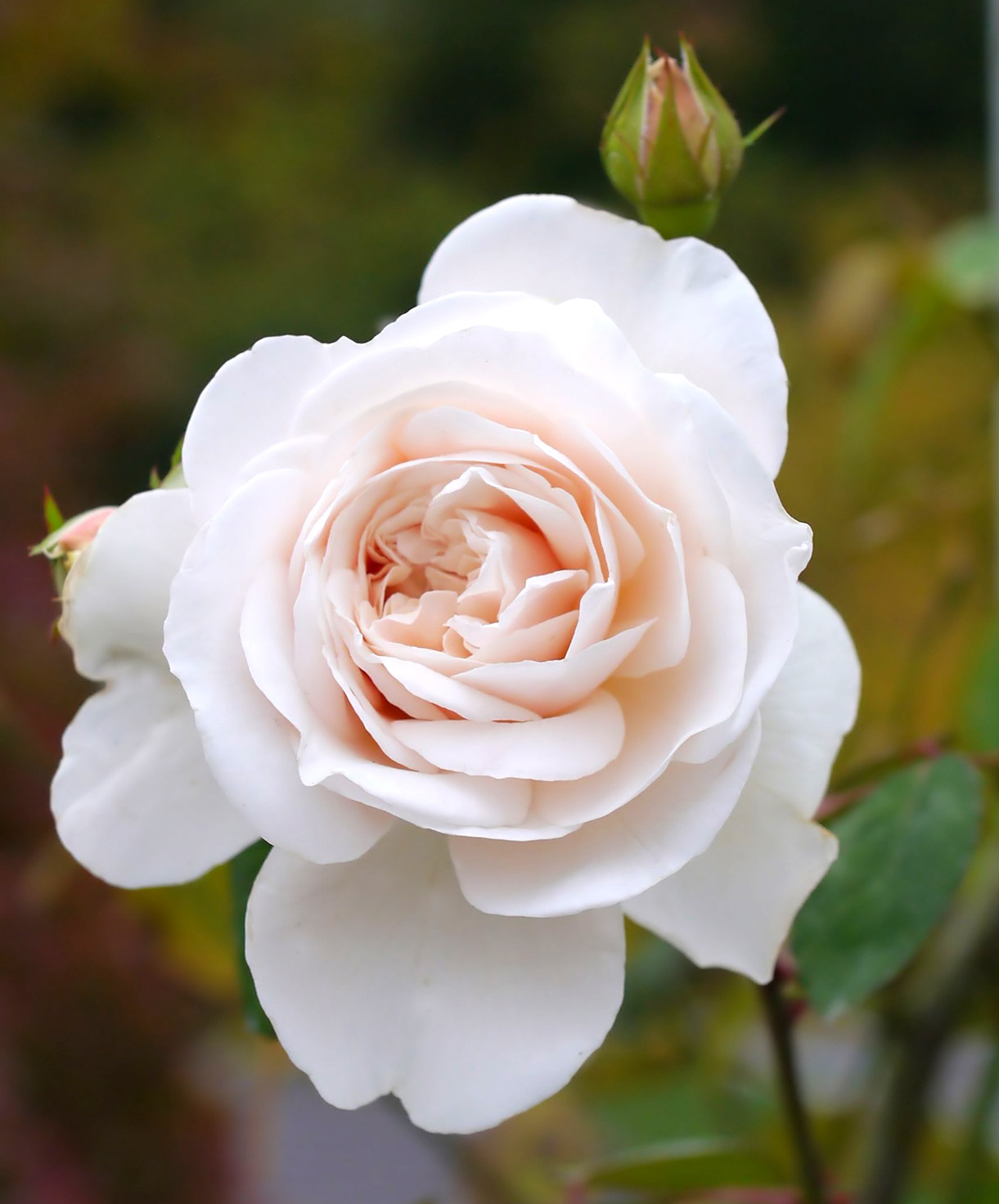
A "Mademoiselle de Sombreuil" Rose

A "belle fleur rose" with shades of white or salmon is named after Mademoiselle de Sombreuil.

=== Art ===
- Walter William Ouless portrayed Sombreuil and her father walking out of Prison de l'Abbaye in his painting Scene from the French Revolution.
- Jean Duplessis-Bertaux engraved a scene showing Sombreuil defending her father, captioned with two lines from Legouvé's poem: Sombreuil vient éperdue affronter le carnage. C'est mon père, dit-elle, arrêtez inhumains (transl. Sombreuil comes, distraught, to confront the carnage. It's my father, she cries; stop, you monsters).

=== Poetry ===
- Victor Hugo wrote "La Mort de Mademoiselle de Sombreuil" in his Odes et Ballades.
- Gabriel-Marie Legouvé dedicated a stanza to Sombreuil in Le Mérite des femmes.
- Jacques Delille referenced Sombreuil's legend in La Pitié, Chant III, verse 13.
