= Jeanne-Louise-Françoise de Sainte-Amaranthe =

French noblewoman and salonnière (1751–1794)

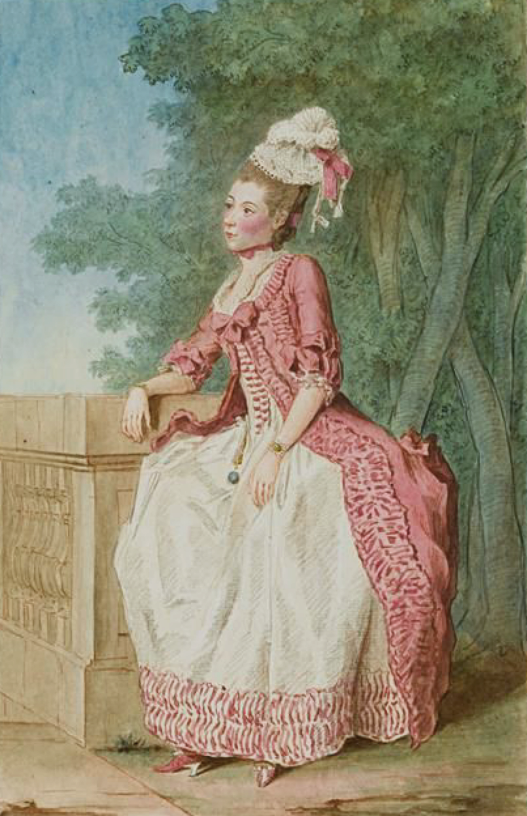
- Sainte-Amaranthe c. 1770
- Born: 16 May 1751
- Died: 17 June 1794 (aged 43); Paris, France
- Cause of death: Guillotined

Jeanne-Louise-Françoise de Sainte-Amaranthe, styled as Madame de Sainte-Amaranthe (16 May 1751 – 17 June 1794), was a French noblewoman and salonnière who ran gambling salons in Paris. During the Reign of Terror period of the French Revolution, she was denounced and arrested by the Committee of Public Safety with her son and daughter. The family was prosecuted alongside 51 other prisoners. After a 2 hour trial, they were all guillotined wearing red robes that were usually worn by executed assassins.

== Background ==
Madame de Sainte-Amaranthe operated two gambling salons in Paris: one in the Galeries du Palais Royale and another in her apartment on rue Vivienne. She operated the salons alongside her daughter, Émilie de Sainte-Amaranthe, and the funds from gambling supported their lavish lifestyle.

Her daughter Émilie began a romantic affair with the opera singer, Jean Elleviou, and would meet with him in secret. Elleviou's clandestine visits at night "dressed as a peasant" but with the "bearing of a gentleman" aroused suspicion. Witnesses believed the mysterious visitor was a royalist named Baron de Batz, or even the revolutionary, Georges Danton. Elleviou's former partner, Clotilde Mafleuroy, denounced the Sainte-Amaranthe family to the Committee of General Security. Mafleuroy mentioned the visits of the disguised visitor in her denunciations.

== Trial and execution ==
The Committee of Public Safety issued an arrest warrant for Sainte-Amaranthe and her family. Later, in his evidence against the Dantonists, Louis Antoine de Saint-Just would go on to accuse Georges Danton of having dinners with her. Maximilien Robespierre is rumored to have argued with Marc-Guillaume Alexis Vadier against targeting Sainte-Amaranthe and her family, but he did not stop their prosecution.

On 17 June 1794, Sainte-Amaranthe, her 19 year old daughter Émilie, and her 17 year old son Louis were prosecuted alongside 51 other defendants, including Cécile Renault and Charles François de Virot de Sombreuil. Their trial before Fouquier-Tinville lasted 2 hours, and they were all executed on the same day while being made to wear red robes that were traditionally symbolic of assassins. The executioner Charles-Henri Sanson wrote in his memoirs that he fell sick that day and had to leave the scaffold.
