= Charles-Henri Sanson =

French executioner (1739–1806)

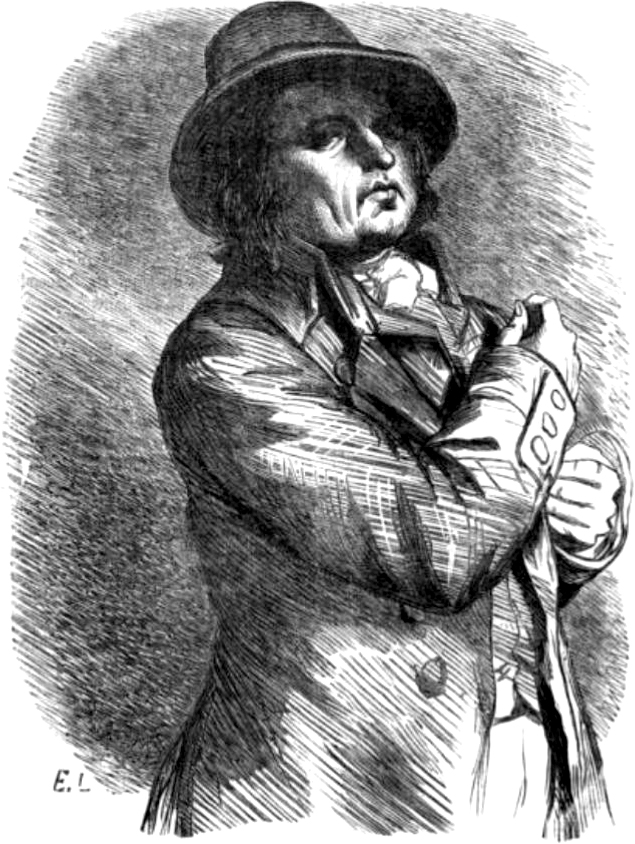
- Posthumous portrait of Sanson by Eugène Lampsonius for a 1851 republication of Un épisode sous la Terreur, an 1830 short story by Honoré de Balzac
- Born: 15 February 1739; Paris, France
- Died: 4 July 1806 (aged 67); Paris, France
- Occupations: Royal executioner of France, high executioner of the First French Republic
- Known for: Performing the execution of Louis XVI

Charles-Henri Sanson (French: [ʃaʁl ɑ̃ʁi sɑ̃sɔ̃]; 15 February 1739 – 4 July 1806), was the royal executioner of France during the reign of King Louis XVI, and later chief executioner of the First French Republic. He administered capital punishment in Paris for over 40 years ("Exécuteur des arrêts criminels de Paris"). He is renowned for carrying out nearly 3,000 executions. During the French Revolution, he was the executioner of Louis XVI, Marie-Antoinette, and Robespierre.

== Family ==
Sanson was born in Paris to Charles Jean-Baptiste Sanson and his first wife Madeleine Tronson. His great-grandfather, Charles Sanson (1658–1695) of Abbeville, served in the French royal army, married into the profession in Dieppe and was later appointed executioner of Paris. Like many judicial offices under the Ancien Régime, the office of executioner was hereditary in practice and remained within a small number of interrelated families.

After establishing himself as executioner of Paris, Charles Sanson gradually introduced his eldest son, Charles (1681–1726), into the office. Around 1695 the latter began assisting his father, and in 1699 assumed the day-to-day duties when his father retired from active service. Charles Sanson (1658–1707) nevertheless remained the holder of the office until his death, reflecting the distinction under the Ancien Régime between possession of the office and its actual exercise.

When Charles Sanson (1681–1726) died, his seven-year-old son Charles Jean-Baptiste formally inherited the office. Because he was still a minor, deputies exercised the office in his name until he reached adulthood. This distinction between the legal holder of the office and its practical exercise was characteristic of many venal offices under the Ancien Régime. According to Henri-Clément Sanson, Charles Jean-Baptiste (1719-1778) combined his judicial duties with a keen interest in anatomy and medicine, maintaining a laboratory where he prepared remedies and treated patients.

== Life ==
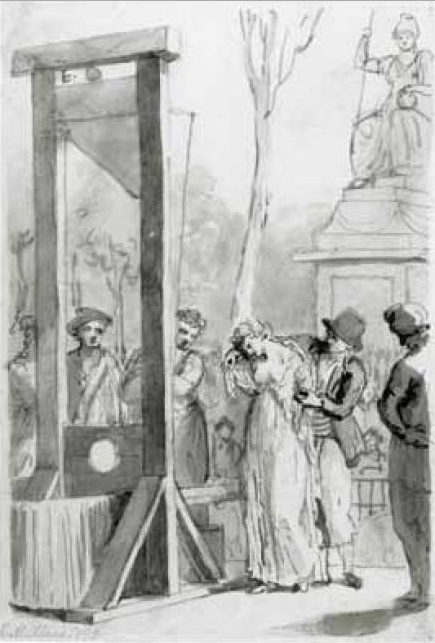
The execution of Olympe de Gouges

Sanson's upbringing took place at a convent school in Rouen until 1753, when his identity as the son of an executioner was revealed. To protect the school's standing, he was compelled to leave and subsequently received private tutoring. His father's paralysis after a stroke, together with the insistence of his paternal grandmother Anne-Marthe Sanson, compelled Charles-Henri to abandon his medical studies and begin training as an executioner in order to support the family. By 1755, Charles-Henri Sanson had already been acting in place of his paralysed father for about two years, although he had not yet received formal investiture as executioner.

In 1757, at the age of eighteen, Sanson assisted his uncle Nicolas-Charles-Gabriel Sanson, executioner of Reims, during the exceptionally brutal execution of Robert-François Damiens, who had attempted to assassinate Louis XV. The journalist Louis Sébastien Mercier wrote in Tableau de Paris that all the executioners from the surrounding towns had been summoned to come and assist with the repulsive acts. The prolonged execution, involving drawing and quartering, deeply affected the young Sanson and, according to later accounts, led his uncle to abandon the profession permanently. It was the last execution by quartering carried out in France.

On January 10, 1765, he married Marie-Anne Jugier. They had at least one son, Henri (1767–1840); a second son, Gabriel, is frequently mentioned in the literature but remains insufficiently documented. Charles-Henri had six younger half-brothers—later executioners in different parts of France—and two sisters. As the eldest son, he trained under his father before succeeding him and was sworn into the office on 26 December 1778.

== Career ==
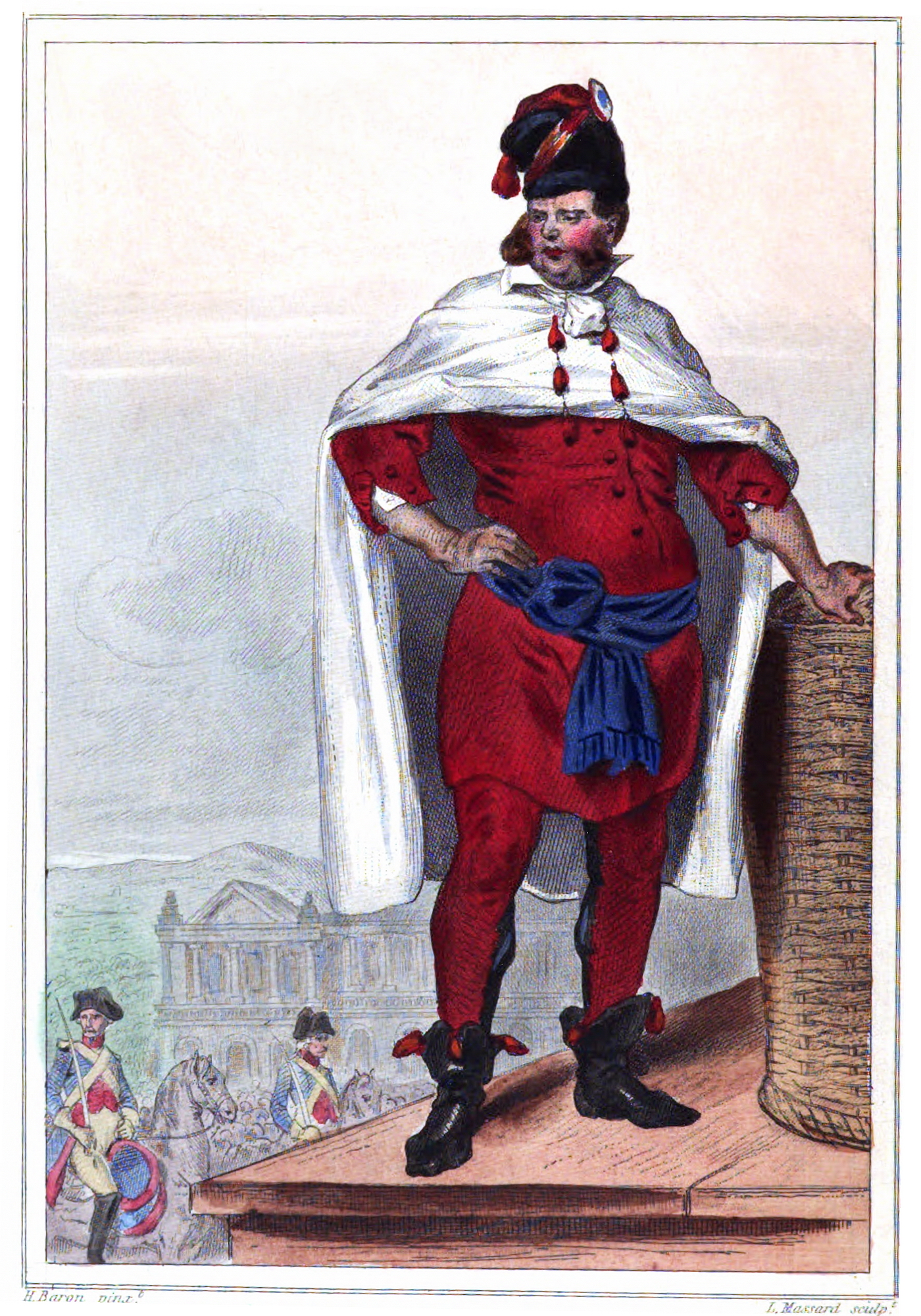
The bourreau under Louis XVI

In 1778 Charles-Henri officially received the traditional scarlet coat, the emblem of the office. He served as chief executioner for the next seventeen years. His official dress also evolved during his career. As executioner, he came to be known as "Monsieur de Paris" to distinguish him from the executioners in other cities. Executions were normally carried out by Sanson with the assistance of up to six assistants.

In 1789 the journalist Camille Desmoulins denounced Sanson in his magazine as a royalist. Sanson began by addressing the issue of citizenship, noting that although executioners were not legally recognized as citizens in France, they were still obliged to pay taxes like any other. The Penal Code of 1791 abolished torture before execution and introduced a single method of capital punishment, the guillotine, reflecting the Revolution's attempt to standardise criminal justice.

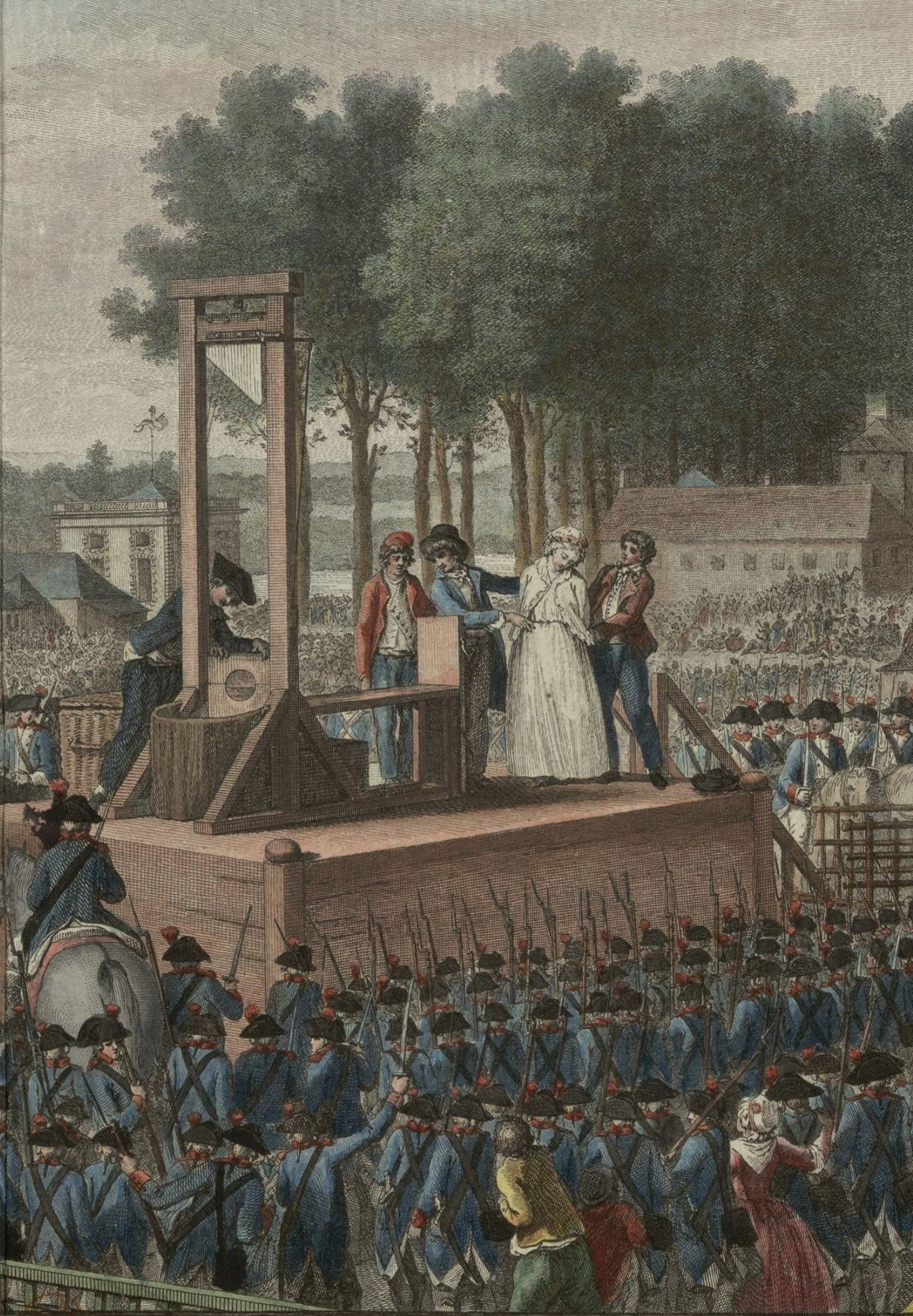
Execution of Marie Antoinette

Sanson was the first executioner to use the guillotine, and he led the initial inspection and testing of its prototype on 17 April 1792, at Bicêtre Hospital in Paris. The tests consisted of decapitating straw bales, followed by live sheep. Within the week, the Legislative Assembly had approved its use and on 25 April, Sanson inaugurated the era of the guillotine by executing Nicolas Jacques Pelletier for robbery and assault at the Place de Grève.

On 12 August 1792, during the reorganisation of the National Guard, Charles-Henri Sanson and his son Henri were appointed sergeants. These appointments obliged them to assume a more active role in public affairs than they would otherwise have wished. Under the revolutionary legal order, the guillotine contributed to changing the social and legal status of executioner from outcast to citizen, equal in rights and civil duties.

=== The introduction of the guillotine ===
Sanson played an important practical role in the adoption of the guillotine. After Joseph-Ignace Guillotin publicly proposed Antoine Louis's new execution machine, Sanson delivered a memorandum based on his practical experience as chief executioner to the French Assembly. Sanson, who owned and maintained all his own equipment, argued persuasively that multiple executions were too demanding for the old methods.

The relatively lightweight tools of his trade broke down under heavy usage, and the repair and replacement costs were prohibitive, unreasonably burdening the executioner. He also argued that the physical effort required increased the likelihood of accidents, while prolonged executions could provoke resistance from the condemned.

=== Execution of Louis XVI ===
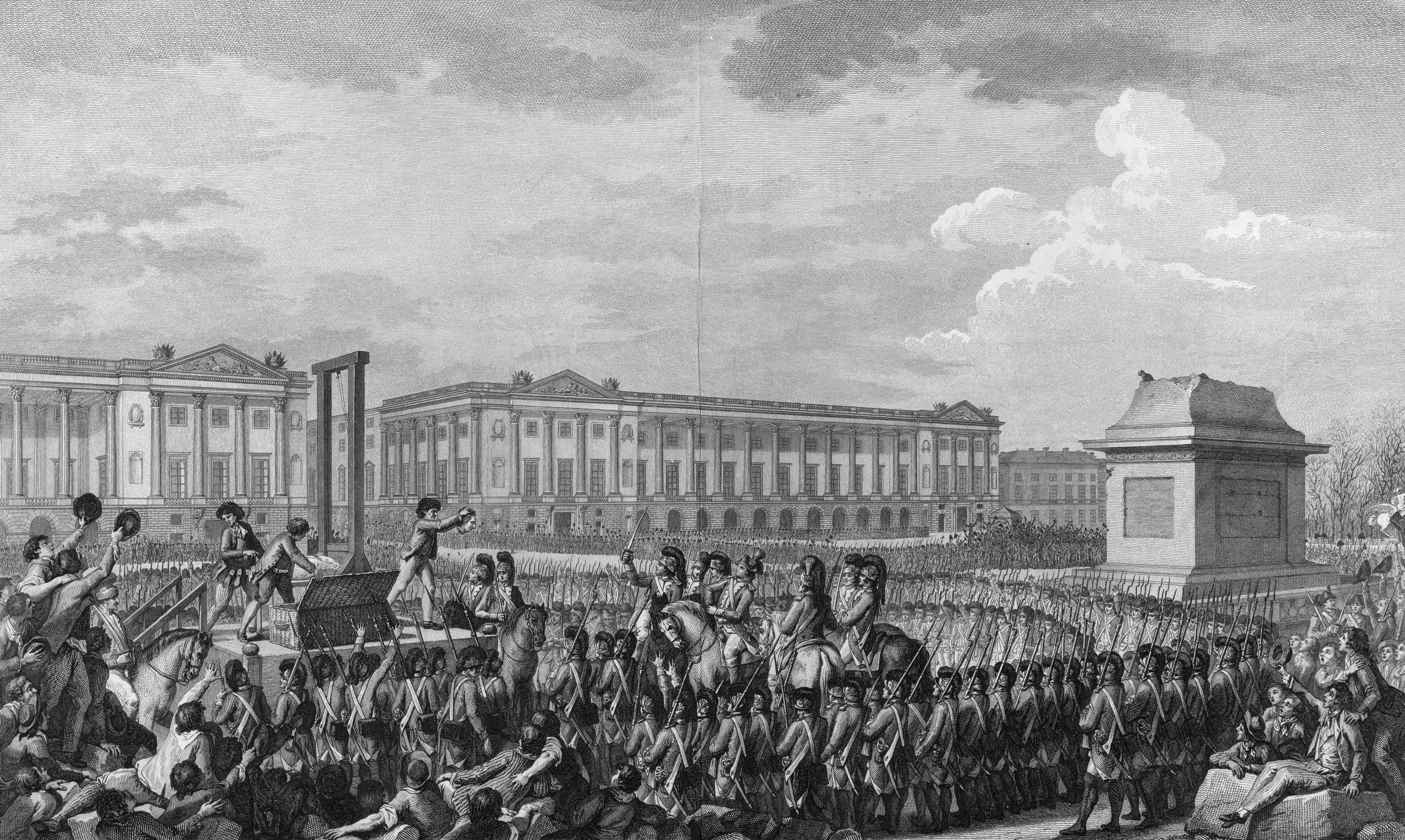
Day of 21 January 1793 – the death of Louis Capet at the Place de la Révolution, by Charles Monnet (1794)

Sanson was initially hesitant to execute Louis XVI but ultimately accepted the duty. As David P. Jordan observes, "No Monsieur de Paris had ever had the honor of executing a king, and Sanson wanted precise instructions." As the hereditary head of a family of executioners, refusing the office would have endangered both his family and its reputation.

Before the execution, Sanson reportedly received warnings that an attempt would be made to rescue the king and that his own life was in danger. On 21 January 1793, the route from the Temple prison to the Place de la Révolution was heavily guarded by troops and National Guards as Louis XVI's carriage took about two hours to reach the scaffold. Sanson was assisted by his half-brothers Charlemagne and Martin.

Two days after the execution, amid widespread rumours surrounding the king's death, Sanson publicly denied rumours that he or members of his household had sold locks of Louis XVI's hair, declaring that he had not allowed anyone "to take or remove even the slightest trace" of the king's remains.

A month after the execution, Sanson published his own account in Le Thermomètre du jour (21 February 1793) in response to rumours surrounding the king's final moments. He wrote that Louis initially resisted removing his coat and having his hands bound, asked whether the drums were still beating, attempted to step forward to address the crowd, and finally submitted calmly to the execution. Sanson concluded that the king had borne his final moments "with a composure and a firmness" which he attributed to the sincerity of his religious convictions.

Modern historians broadly agree with the general course of events described by Sanson. Simon Schama likewise concludes that Louis attempted to address the crowd before being drowned out by the drums, after which one of Sanson's assistants displayed the severed head. David Andress discusses later reports that the blade failed to sever the neck at the first stroke, but considers it unlikely that Louis uttered the cry described by one witness because the spinal cord had already been severed.

=== Grande Terreur ===
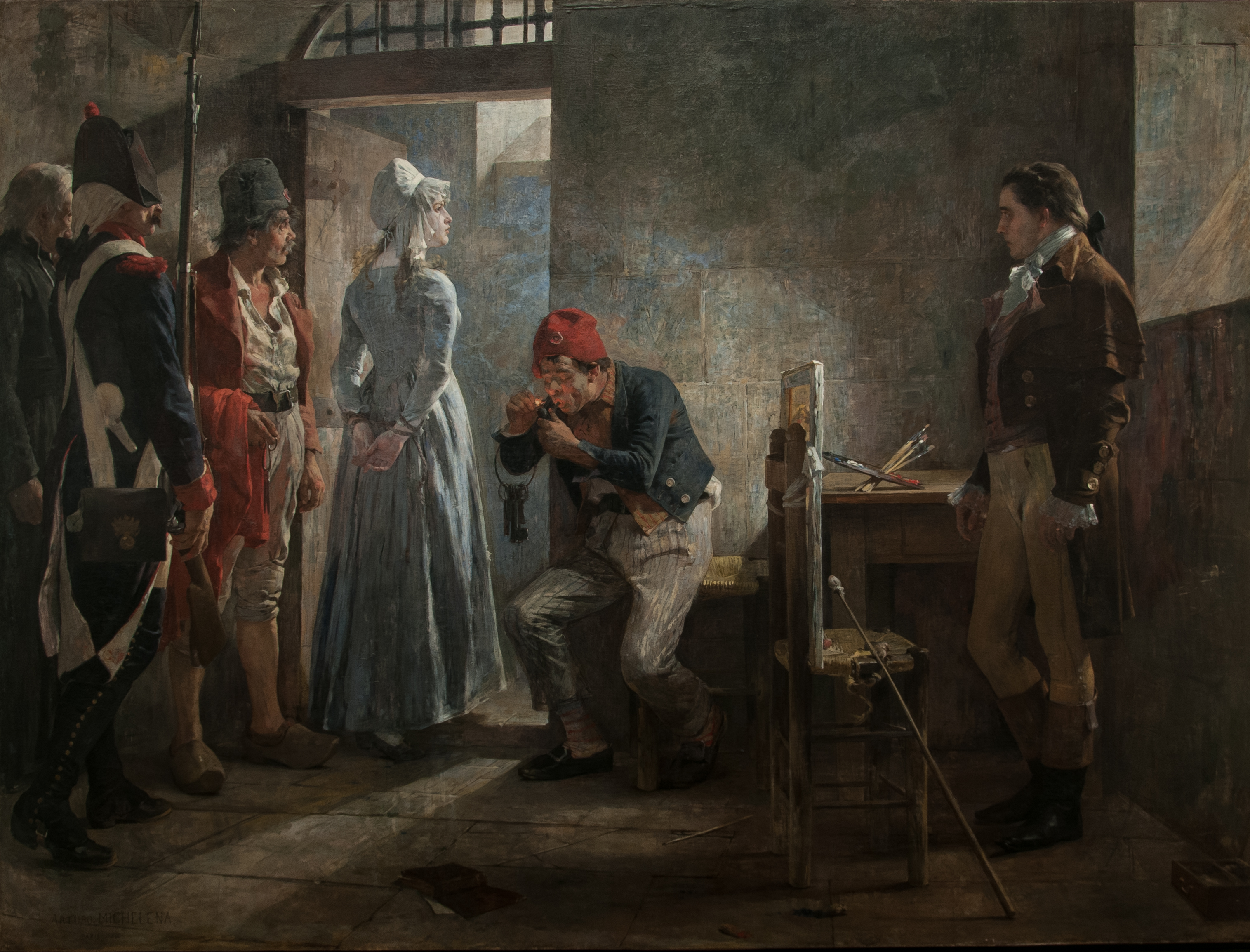
Charlotte Corday being conducted to her execution, painted by Arturo Michelena (1889)

On 17 July 1793 Sanson executed Charlotte Corday, the assassin of Jean-Paul Marat. After Corday's decapitation, a carpenter named Legros, who had spent the day repairing the guillotine, lifted her head from the basket and slapped it on the cheek. Sanson indignantly rejected published reports that Legros was one of his assistants, stating that he was not a member of the execution staff. Several witnesses reported an expression of "unequivocal indignation" on her face when her cheek was struck. The incident has often been cited in discussions of whether consciousness may briefly persist after decapitation, including by Albert Camus in his Reflections on the Guillotine. According to Sanson's account, Legros was arrested by the Revolutionary Tribunal and publicly reprimanded.

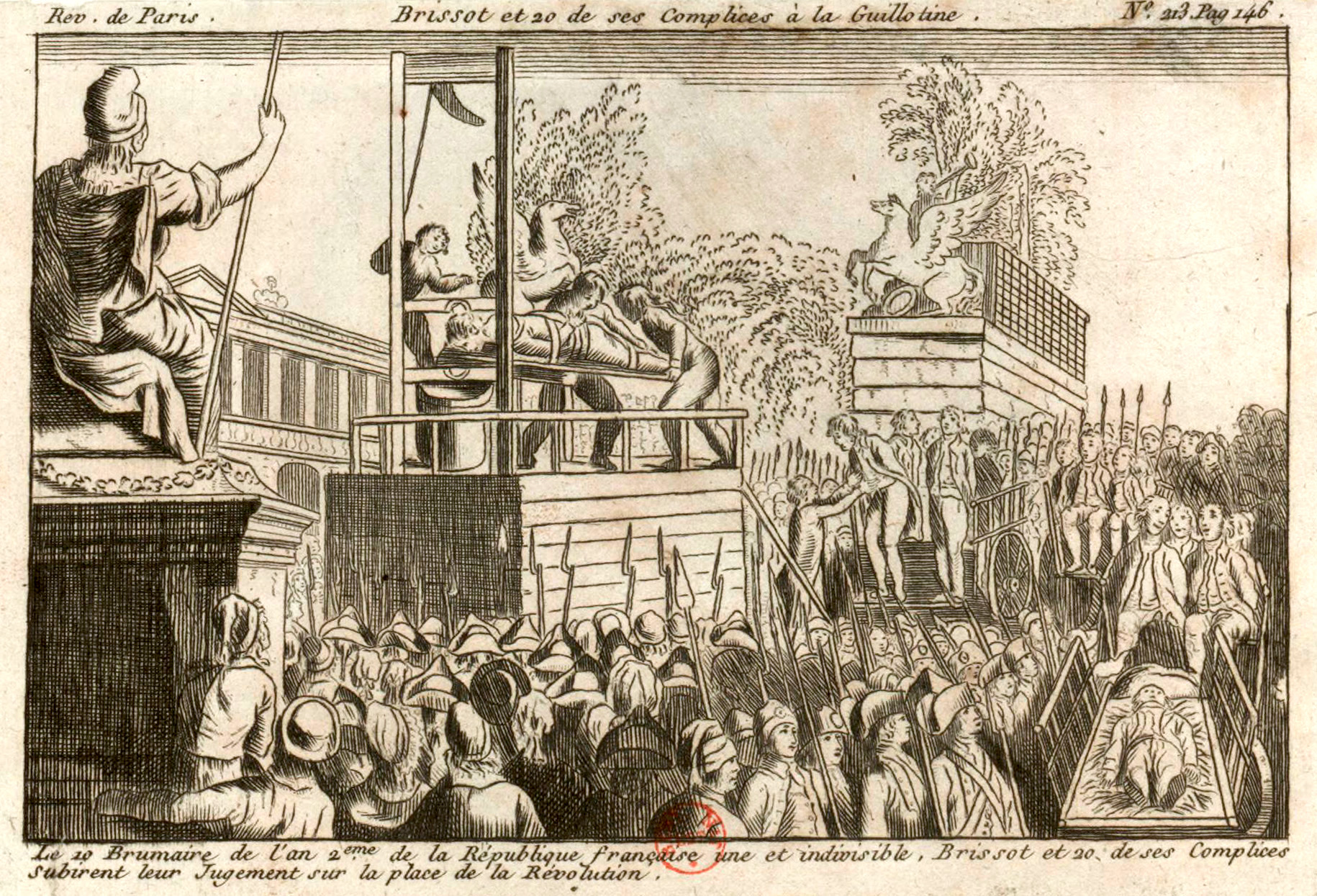
Execution of Girondins revolutionary Jacques Pierre Brissot on 31 October 1793

On 31 October 1793, Sanson, assisted by ten men, including his son Henri, executed twenty-one leading Girondins; their execution took 36 minutes. According to the nineteenth-century Mémoires, Henri supervised the removal of the bodies behind the scaffold, where they were placed in pairs in the baskets awaiting transport.

In a journal entry dated 2 February 1794, Sanson criticized the severity of sentences imposed by the Revolutionary Tribunal, arguing that an executioner should punish murderers and thieves rather than citizens condemned for their political opinions. According to Reising, this reflected Sanson's reading of Cesare Beccaria, which differed from that of revolutionary leaders who invoked Beccaria to justify political executions during the Terror.

In the following months Sanson and his assistants carried out the executions of successive waves of prominent revolutionaries, including Hébert, Danton, Desmoulins, Saint-Just and Robespierre. During the Terror, Fouquier-Tinville routinely instructed Sanson each morning whether the guillotine should be erected that day, before judgments had been pronounced.

Less well known is the execution of Cécile Renault, together with three members of her family and fifty other prisoners, including Madame de Sainte-Amaranthe and Charles François de Virot de Sombreuil, on 17 June 1794. According to the Mémoires, Sanson left the scaffold sick before the executions had been completed.

=== Thermidor ===
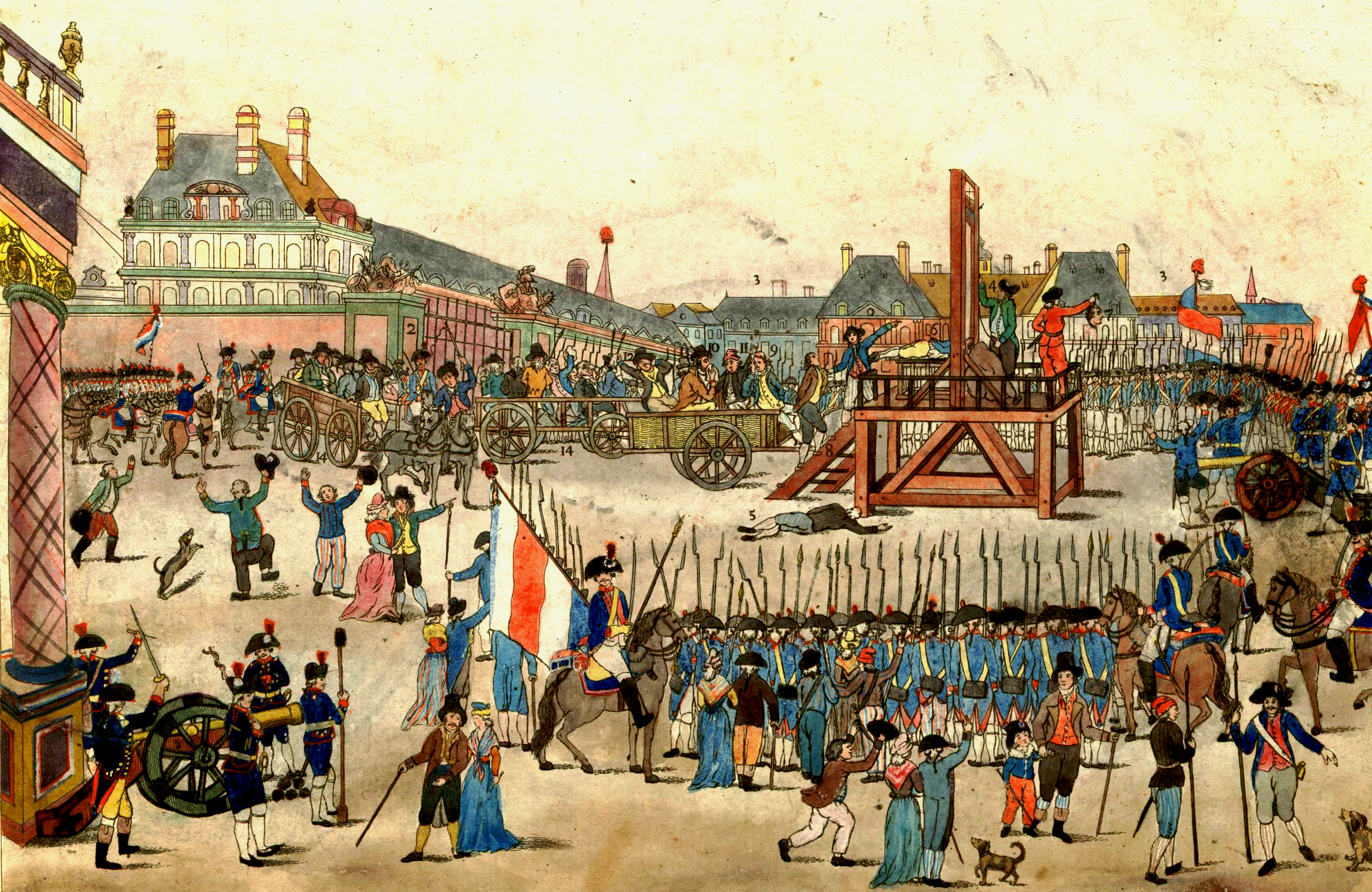
Execution of Robespierre 28 July, 1794; Sanson is figure # 4

According to the author, his father Henri did not participate in the execution of Robespierre on 10 Thermidor but later carried out the executions of Jean-Baptiste Carrier, Fouquier-Tinville and Martial Herman. Henri Sanson later wrote that, as an artillery officer, he was ordered to assemble with his company in front of the Hôtel de Ville on 9 Thermidor. According to his account, neither he nor the other officers knew what was happening or whether the Convention or the Commune exercised lawful authority. Only later that evening did they learn that the Convention had prevailed. At the end of August they were imprisoned in the Conciergerie with forty-one other accused and were released on 1 September 1794.

Charles-Henri remained in office for 43 years. Over the course of his career, Sanson is credited with 2,918 executions. According to the family diary, 2,548 were carried out between 14 July 1789 and 1 October 1796, among them 370 women, twenty-two minors and nine people over the age of eighty. Emile Campardon counted 2,791 capital sentences pronounced by the Revolutionary Court between March 10, 1793 and May 31, 1795. Sanson served successive governments without interruption, executing sentences under the monarchy, the Legislative Assembly, the National Convention, and the Directory. During the Revolution he found himself carrying out the sentences of successive governments against those who had only recently held power.

== Final years ==
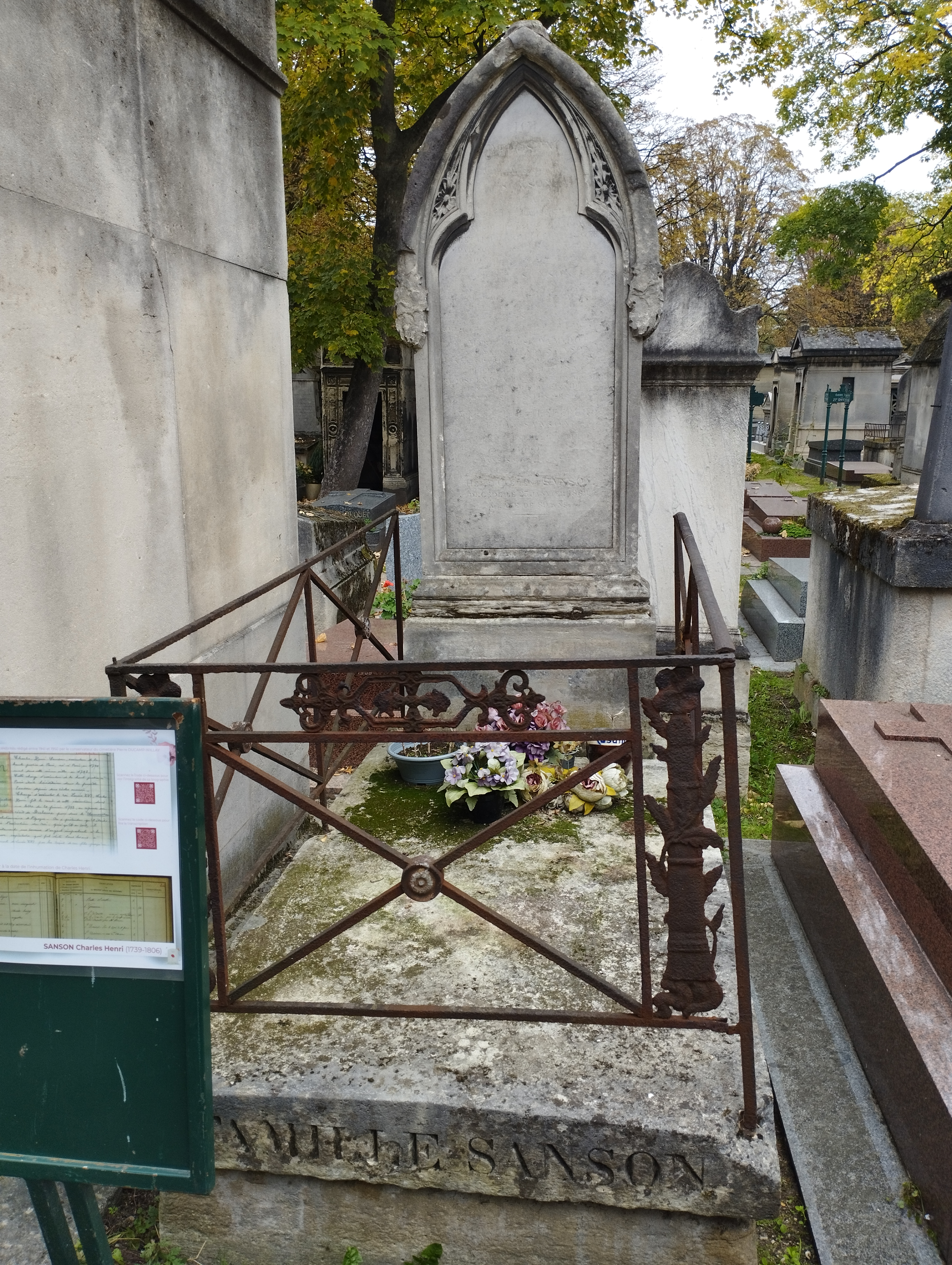
Headstone of the Sanson family at Montmartre Cemetery: tomb of Charles-Henri Sanson, his son Henri Sanson, with his wife, Marie-Louise Damidot and grandson Henri-Clément Sanson, with his wife Virginie-Emilie Lefébure

After several years of declining health (nephritis), Charles-Henri Sanson resigned as executioner of Paris on 30 August 1795. He died in Paris on 4 July 1806 and was buried in the family vault, located in Montmartre Cemetery.

Charles-Henri Sanson's son Henri was formally appointed his successor on 4 September 1795 (18 Fructidor, Year III) and remained chief executioner until his death in 1840, serving for forty-five years. Although Henri assumed responsibility for many executions after 1793, Charles-Henri remained involved in executions after his resignation, and contemporary evidence indicates that father and son continued to work together after the formal succession; both participated in an execution in October 1796 and 1801.

=== Posthumous legacy ===
Sanson's posthumous reputation was shaped largely by a series of memoirs published in the nineteenth century.

Mémoires de l'exécuteur des hautes-œuvres and Mémoires pour servir à l’histoire de la Révolution française, published in 1830 and 1831, are the apocryphal memoirs attributed to Henri Sanson. The project was initiated during the Bourbon Restoration in France by Louis-François L'Héritier, who received the commission in 1829 and enlisted Honoré de Balzac, who wrote at least part of the opening volume. The first critique appeared in February 1830. Presented as the recollections of Henri Sanson, the memoirs were publicly repudiated by him, who declared that he had neither written nor authorised them and that they bore little resemblance to the papers left by his father.

"These two volumes are moreover a tissue of mendacious allegations and puerile inventions, devoid, I will not say only of truth, but even of plausibility" and "I declare that I have never written anything similar and that the memories that my father left us offer no analogy with this publication, of which all the details are romantic."

Publication was suspended at his request in 1830, although a further publication appeared in 1831. Henri instructed his son to examine and correct the two publications.

More than thirty years later, (1862–1863), Henri-Clément Sanson, the last executioner of the family, published a new work entitled Sept générations d’exécuteurs, 1688–1847. In an extensive autobiographical introduction he rejected the earlier memoirs as an unauthorised and romanticised account of his family's history and presented his own work as a reconstruction based on family papers, correspondence, private notes, official records and printed historical sources, while explicitly distinguishing it from the earlier memoir project. In 1840 Henri-Clément stated that Balzac had based parts of the opening narrative on information supplied by Henri Sanson, while the fictional conclusion was devised to provide an origin story for the apocryphal memoirs. An English translation, Memoirs of the Sansons; or, Seven Generations of Executioners, was published in 1876 and introduced the work to an English-speaking readership.

These successive publications, including newspaper serialisations, ensured that Charles-Henri Sanson remained one of the best-known executioners in European history. They also gave rise to a complex historiography in which family traditions, authentic documents, historical scholarship on the French Revolution, editorial reconstruction, and literary narrative became closely intertwined.

== Bibliography ==
- Geoffrey Abbott (1995) Family of Death: Six Generations of Executioners. Robert Hale, London.
- Applbaum, A. I. (1995). Professional Detachment: The Executioner of Paris. Harvard Law Review, 109(2), 458–486.
- Bourdin, Philippe (2004). "Sept générations d'exécuteurs. Mémoires des bourreaux Sanson (1688–1847)." Annales historiques de la Révolution française, no. 337.
- Robert Christophe (1960) Les Sanson, bourreaux de père en fils, pendant deux siècles. Arthème Fayard, Paris.
- Robert Christophe (1962) THE EXECUTIONERS. A History Of The Sanson Family, Public Executioners In France 1688 ~ 1847.
- Daniel Gerould (1992) Guillotine. Its Legend and Lore. Blast Books
- Roger Goulard (1950) Balzac et les “Mémoires de Sanson” In: Mercure de France, 1 novembre 1950, p. 479-480
- Roger Goulard (1951) L'exécution de Louis XVI. (D'apès des document inédits), Mercure de France, 1 novembre 1951, p. 89-.
- Roger Goulard (1968) Une lignée d’exécuteurs des jugements criminels; les Sanson, 1688-1847.
- G. Lenotre (1893 and 1920) La guillotine et les exécuteurs des arrêts criminels pendant la Révolution. Paris, Perrin.
- G. Lenotre (1929) The Guillotine and Its Servants. London: Hutchinson & Company.
- Barbara Levy (1973) Legacy of Death. Saxon House.
- Barbara Levy (1989) LES SANSON: UNE DYNASTIE DE BOURREAUX. Mercure de France.
- Willa Carlyle Reising (2024) Beccaria, the Executioner, and the French Revolution. Morgantown, West Virginia University.

=== Primary sources ===
- Charles-Henri Sanson (1830), Mémoires de l'exécuteur des hautes-œuvres, Paris, M.A. Grégoire, 1830.
- Sanson, Charles-Henri (1831). Mémoires de Sanson: Mémoires pour servir à l'histoire de la Révolution française (in French). Vol. 2. Paris: Chez les marchands de nouveautés.
- Henri-Clément Sanson (1862–1863) Sept générations d'exécuteurs, 1688–1847. 6 vols. Paris: Dupray de la Mahérie.
- H.C. Sanson (1879), Sept générations d'exécuteurs (1688–1847), S. Lambert et Cie, éditeurs
- Henri-Clément Sanson (1879), Sept générations d'exécuteurs (1688–1847)
- Henri Sanson (1962) Executioners All: Memoirs of the Sanson Family from Private Notes and Documents 1688-1847. Neville Spearman, London.
- Gabriel Honoré de Balzac (1830, revised 1845) Un épisode sous la Terreur (fiction)
