= Un épisode sous la Terreur =

Short story by Honoré de Balzac

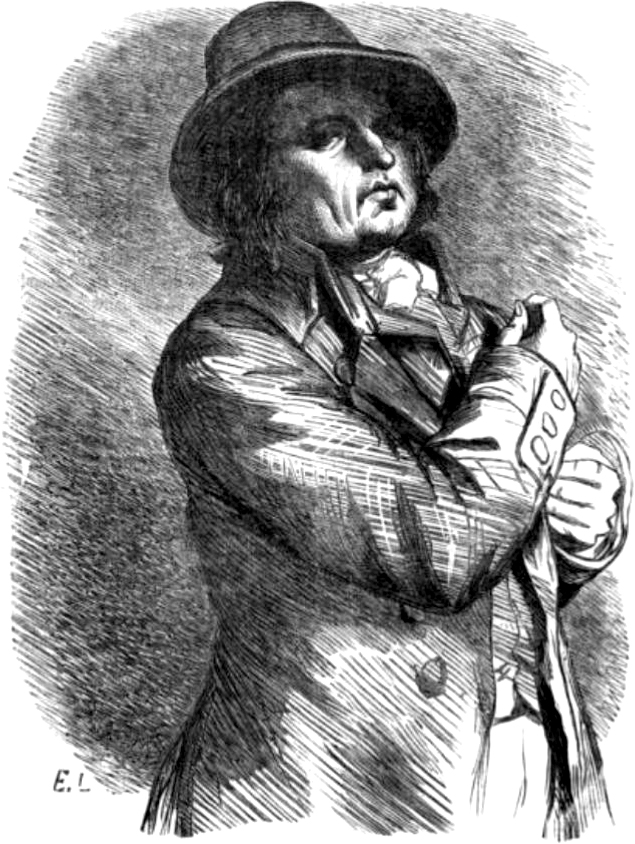
- Portrait of Sanson by Eugène Lampsonius
- Author: Honoré de Balzac
- Language: French
- Series: La Comédie humaine
- Publication date: 1830
- Publication place: France

Un épisode sous la Terreur (English "An Episode during the Terror") is a short story by Honoré de Balzac, published in 1830. Originally titled Une messe en 1793 (A Mass in 1793), the text took its final title in the Chlendowski edition of 1845. The work appears in Scènes de la vie politique (Scenes from Political Life), which is a part of the series of works that make up La Comédie humaine (The Human Comedy), Balzac's multi-volume collection of interlinked stories. The later edition is dedicated to Monsieur Guyonnet-Merville, under whom Balzac had done his apprenticeship and studied the foundations of law.

== Plot summary ==
An elderly woman buys a package from a bakery on 22 January 1793, and suspects she is being followed. She asks for protection from the baker, but when he sees the stranger following her he refuses. She returns home alone, and it is revealed that she is an ex-Carmelite nun in hiding with another nun and a priest. All are elderly, and the box she bought contains communion wafers. The stranger comes up to their room, and asks the priest to say a mass for the recently executed King Louis XVI. He returns later to attend the mass. He also says that he will come back in a year for another mass for the king, and promises that they will be safe from any danger. He leaves a blood stained handkerchief with royal insignia as a present.

The next year the stranger returns for the mass. Later, the priest visits a shop owned by some Royalist friends of his, and notices a tumbril passing by with the executioner and his victims. The priest faints when he recognises that the executioner is the stranger who has been helping them, and realises that the handerkerchief was the king's.

== Historical background ==
The story takes place during the Reign of Terror, from 1793 to 1794. It starts the day after the execution of King Louis XVI. The story is fictional, but it features an historical figure, Charles-Henri Sanson, who was the High Executioner, and conducted the execution of Louis XVI. However the story does not give his name.

The Reign of Terror was a period during which there was a process of Dechristianisation occurring in France. The nuns and priest in the story are in hiding because of this.

== Inspiration ==
The idea of writing the story was most likely born after Balzac's meeting with Sanson's son, Henri-Nicolas-Charles Sanson, also an executioner. Perhaps the son's stories about his father— an extremely religious man despite his work—inspired Balzac to write a story that is not based on actual facts, but on the human aspect of a real life character, and on alternate events that could have taken place. An Episode Under the Terror is also a clear proof of the influence of Romanticism on Balzac's work, and is evident in the general atmosphere of the story and its structure (the mystery of the main character and the drama of the final scene).
