= Charles Eugène Gabriel de Sombreuil =

French Royalist commander

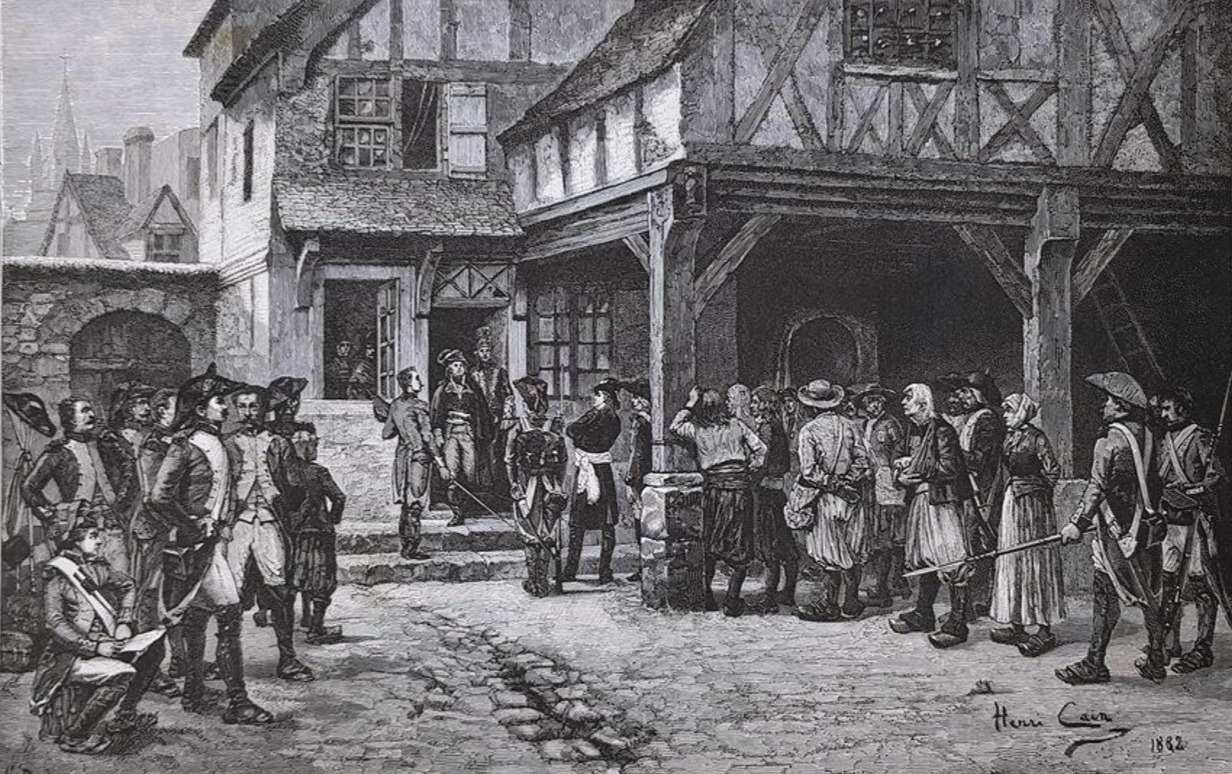
Arrest of Sombreuil by Henri Cain, 1882

Charles Eugène Gabriel de Sombreuil (11 July 1770 – 28 July 1795) was a French royalist commander during the French Revolution. He was born in Bonnac-la-Côte to Charles François de Virot de Sombreuil, the governor of Les Invalides, and Marie-Magdeleine des Flottes de Leychoisier. He had two older siblings: Maurille de Sombreuil (born 1767) and Stanislas de Virot de Sombreuil (born 1768). According to legend, Sombreuil's sister Maurille drank a glass of blood to save their father from being killed during the September Massacres in 1792. Sombreuil's father and brother were both executed by guillotine in July 1794.

In July 1795, Sombreuil helped lead the Quiberon expedition. The invasion was a failure, and for betraying the Revolution he and 750 of his fellow soldiers were executed by firing squad.
