= Henry-Clément Sanson =

French executioner (1799–1889)

Henri-Clément Sanson (27 May 1799 – 25 January 1889) was a French executioner. He held the position of Royal Executioner of the City of Paris, serving King Louis-Philippe I from 1840 to 1847.

Sanson was born into a long line of seven executioners. His father was Henri Sanson, the city's chief executioner for 45 years, and his grandfather was Charles-Henri Sanson, the storied executioner of royals and revolutionaries.

According to Henri-Clément Sanson, following the death of his grandfather and the sale of the family's ancestral property at Brie-Comte-Robert, the family settled at Brunoy in a house purchased under the name "de Longval". There he attended a local school until he was 12 years old, later he was a pupil of the Lycée Charlemagne.

== Career as executioner ==
Henri-Clément served as executioner for less than eight years, the shortest tenure of any member of the Sanson dynasty. Following his marriage in 1817, he began accompanying his father to executions as part of a lengthy apprenticeship, but initially remained an observer, taking no active part in carrying out the executions themselves. His father's prolonged illness in 1819 compelled him to assume an active role in the office for the first time. Although he did not become the official holder of the office until 1840, he had exercised its functions for many years before his dismissal in 1847. Sanson was a conservative moralist shaped by Joseph de Maistre, but whose personal experience as an executioner led him to question the death penalty itself.

In the late 1840s the Tussaud brothers Joseph and Francis, gathering relics for Madame Tussauds wax museum, visited Henri-Clément Sanson and secured parts of one of the original guillotines used during the Reign of Terror. The executioner "pawned his guillotine, and got into woeful trouble for alleged trafficking in municipal property". In 1847 he was dismissed after financial difficulties (gambling). The French government redeemed the instrument before his final execution and removed him from office shortly afterwards, at which point the 159-year Sanson legacy of executioners came to an end. He was succeeded by Charles-André Férey. According to the autobiographical preface, he then left Paris and lived for twelve years under an assumed name before returning to publish his family history.

In 1862–1863 Henri-Clément Sanson published the six-volume Sept générations d'exécuteurs, 1688–1847. Henri-Clément presents his work as a revised version of the 1830 publication. Much of the later confusion surrounding the Sanson dynasty stems from uncertainty over the succession of the office and from the limited acceptance of Henri-Clément Sanson's Sept générations d'exécuteurs as a historical source.

== Sept générations d'exécuteurs ==
Volume I opens with a brief autobiographical preface followed by an extensive historical essay on the history, legal context and moral aspects of capital punishment. It discusses the historical, legal and moral aspects of the death penalty, including the influence of Cesare Beccaria, before turning to the history of the Sanson family.

Unlike the earlier Mémoires pour servir à l'histoire de la Révolution française (1830–1831), which were initiated by Louis-François L'Héritier and partly written by Honoré de Balzac, his father, Henri Sanson publicly repudiated the publication as “a tissue of mendacious allegations and puerile inventions”. In a letter written shortly before his death in 1840, he stated that he had neither written nor authorized the memoirs and that they bore little resemblance to the papers left by his father.

Henri-Clément drew upon surviving family papers as well as printed historical sources, including historians such as Toulongeon and Louis Blanc, while also quoting contemporary documents and publications. The existence of this family archive is independently documented. Contemporary accounts describe Henri Sanson showing visitors - Alexandre Dumas and Victor Hugo - his private collection, documents and execution relics at his house in the Rue des Marais. Victor Hugo later recalled that visitors were taken to a nearby workshop belonging to the charpentier des hautes-œuvres, where the guillotine was kept assembled.

In 1886 Musée Carnavalet acquired part of the collection, comprising twenty-one bound volumes of execution orders (1808–1832), now preserved in the Bibliothèque historique de la ville de Paris.

Henri-Clément Sanson portrayed his great-grandfather as an enthusiastic student of anatomy and medicinal plants. According to family tradition, Charles-Jean-Baptiste maintained a collection of medical recipes, received patients at his home, and prepared remedies in his own laboratory, charging wealthy patients while treating the poor free of charge.

Henri-Clément Sanson also provided details about the finances of the office. After the abolition of the droit de havage under the Regency, the executioner of Paris was assigned a fixed annual salary of 16,000 livres, but payments were often delayed. According to Sanson, his ancestor Charles Sanson II eventually received 50,000 livres in notes of the Banque royale, by then severely depreciated during the collapse of John Law’s financial system; Henri-Clément claimed that these notes remained in the family papers. Besides family history, Henri-Clément Sanson's work preserves numerous observations on the institutional organisation and finances of the Paris executioner's office.

Modern historians have noted both the documentary value and the literary character of the work. Philippe Bourdin describes Henri-Clément as a man with literary interests whose memoirs combine family tradition, historical narrative and a pronounced taste for sensationalism, while remaining an important source for the history of public executions and the Sanson family.
