= Catherine Ouless =

British painter (1879–1961)

- Born: 1879
- Died: 1961 (aged 81–82)
- Known for: Painting

Catherine Ouless (1879 – 1961) was a British painter. She was the daughter of the painter Walter William Ouless. Her portrait of Andrew Carnegie is in the collection of the National Galleries of Scotland. Her portrait of Esther Elizabeth Burrows and her portrait of Winifred Moberly are in the collection of St Hilda's College, Oxford.
