= Eugène Lampsonius =

French painter and illustrator

- Born: Auguste-Hilaire Eugène Lampsonius; 1822; Joué-du-Bois
- Died: 1871 (aged 48–49); Paris
- Known for: Illustration; Portraiture

Auguste-Hilaire Eugène Lampsonius (1822–1871) was a French painter and illustrator.

He is best known for his illustrations of the works of Eugène Sue, Honoré de Balzac, and Alexandre Dumas, as well as for his graphite portraits of Comédie-Française actors. He signed these portraits as Eustache Lorsay.

Lampsonius was born in Joué-du-Bois, and died in Paris in 1871.

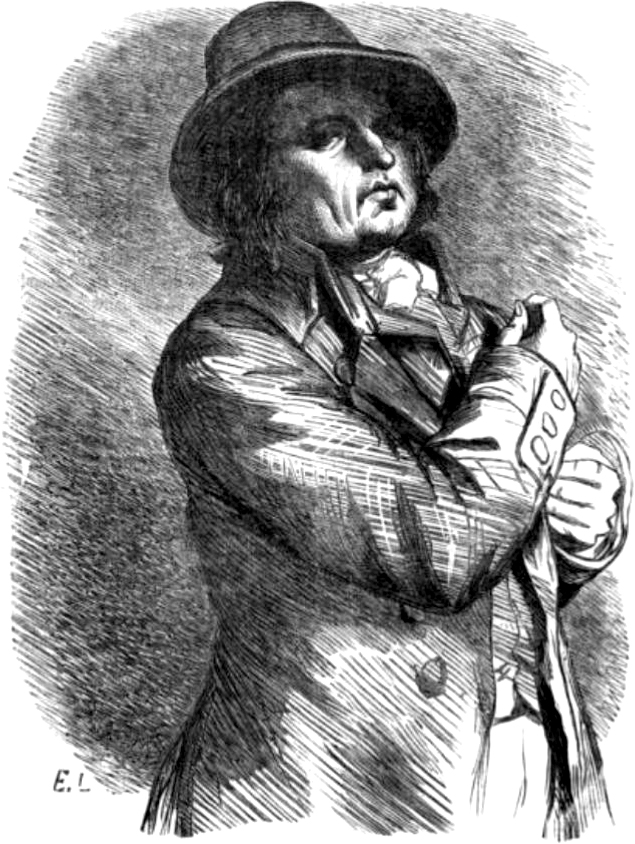
Imaginary portrait of Charles-Henri Sanson by Eugène Lampsonius

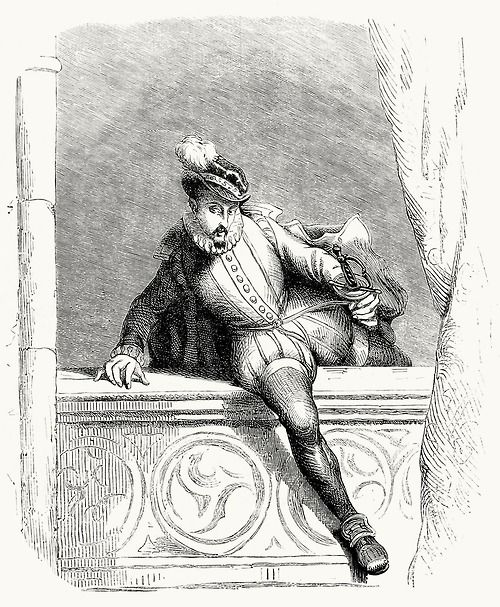
La reine Margot (Queen Margot), by Alexandre Dumas, illustrated by E. Lampsonius and D. Lancelot, Paris, 1855.

== See also ==
- Michel Lévy Frères
