= Charles François de Virot de Sombreuil =

French general

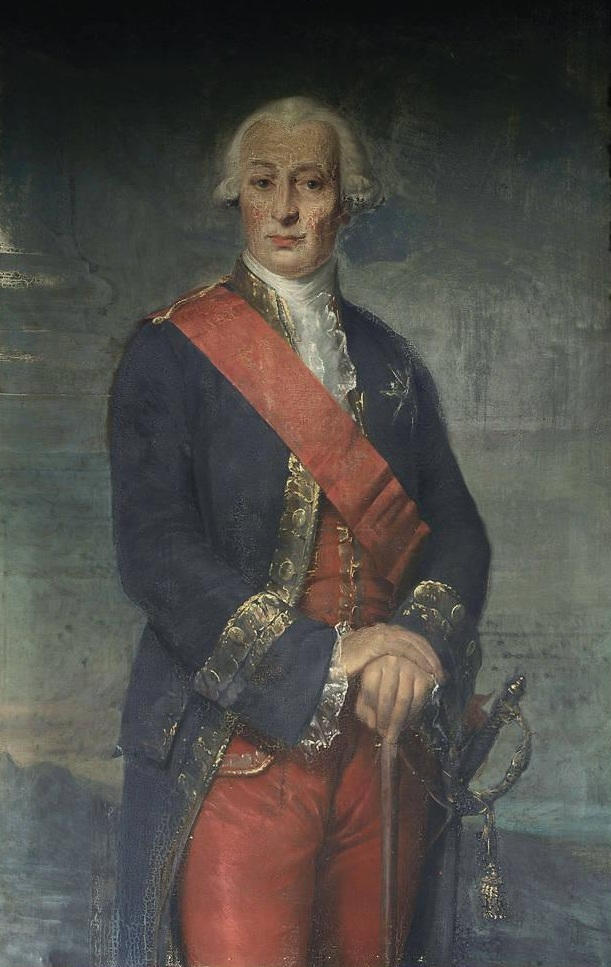
- Born: 12 January 1725; Ensisheim, France
- Died: 17 June 1794 (aged 71) Paris, France
- Allegiance: Kingdom of France
- Branch: French Army
- Service years: 1735–1794
- Rank: Lieutenant General
- Conflicts: War of the Austrian Succession; Battle of Rocoux
- Awards: Order of Saint Louis
- Spouse: Marie-Madeleine des Flottes de l'Eychoisier (m. 1748–1780)
- Children: 3, incl. Charles and Maurille
- Other work: Governor of Les Invalides

Charles François de Virot (also spelt Viraud or Vireaux) marquis de Sombreuil (12 January 1725 – 17 June 1794) was a French Royalist general of the Ancien Régime and French Revolutionary Wars. He rose to become maréchal de camp, hero of the Battle of Rocoux and governor of Les Invalides.

== Military career ==
De Virot was appointed as a second lieutenant in the régiment de Montmorin on 16 July 1735. Commissioning and promotion by purchase was common practice in the pre-revolutionary Royal Army, although abolished in the infantry in 1758. He reached the rank of captain on 20 May 1745 and that of lieutenant colonel of the régiment Royal-Corse in 1758.

After distinguishing himself in the field and holding various garrison commands in peace-time France, de Virot was appointed governor of the Invalides in Paris on 16 December 1786. While his command consisted only of veteran pensioners no longer considered suitable for active military service, de Virot was also responsible for the safeguarding of large stocks of weapons stored in the building complex.

== French Revolution ==
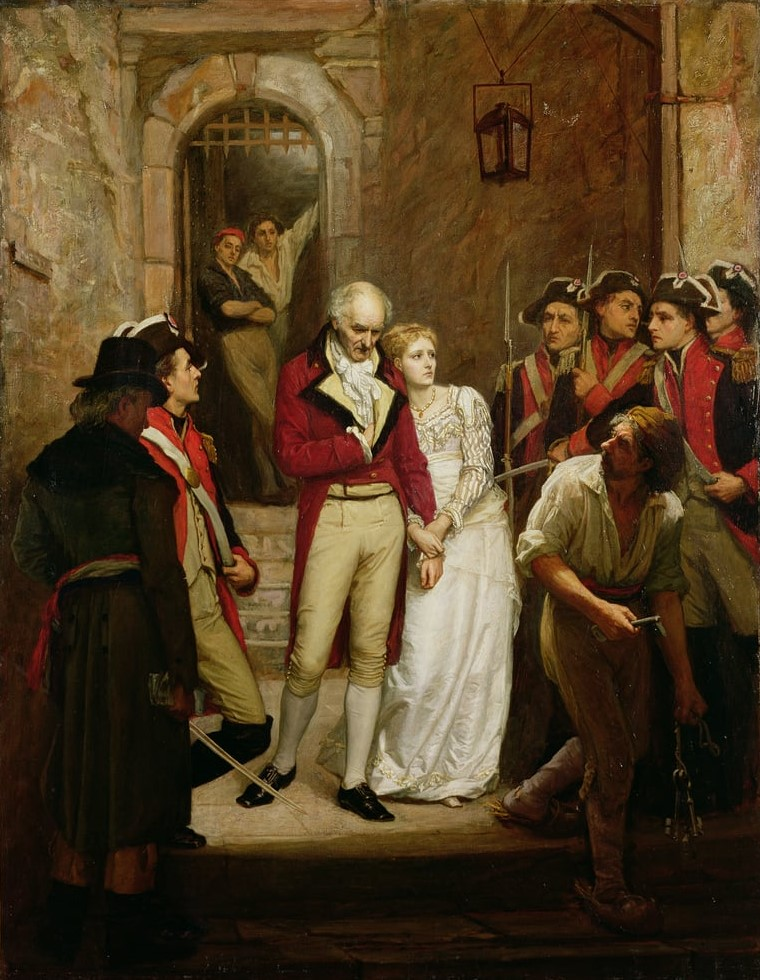
An Incident during the September Massacres: Charles François de Virot de Sombreuil and his daughter leaving the prison. Painting by Walter William Ouless

On 14 July 1789, widespread disturbances in Paris led to the seizure of the Hotel de Invalides and the Storming of the Bastille. Demands had been made to Sombreuil by the newly organised electors militia for the handing over of the thirty thousand muskets stored in the cellars of the Invalides. The governor delayed by responding that he would need approval from Versailles; while ordering his unenthusiastic pensioners to begin to disable the weapons held. Unlike Bernard-René Jourdan de Launay, the governor of the Bastille, Sombreuil subsequently accepted the revolutionaries' demands to surrender his garrison without attempting armed resistance. He thereby avoided the fate of de Launay, who was seized and killed by the mob.

Sombreuil was promoted to lieutenant-general, in what was still nominally the Royal Army, on 20 May 1791. He participated in the defence of the Tuileries Palace on 10 August 1792, when the monarchy was finally overthrown. Imprisoned in the Abbey Prison six days later, he survived the September massacres, before being moved to two other prisons between December 1793 and May 1794. His daughter Maurille de Sombreuil (born 1767) had demanded to be imprisoned with him.

Sombreuil was finally sentenced to death on 29 Prairial Year II (17 June 1794) by the Revolutionary Tribunal of Paris under Fouquier-Tinville. The charges against him included that of being an accomplice in a planned prison uprising and of conspiring to assassinate Collot d'Herbois, a representative of the people.

=== Execution ===
Together with his son Stanislas, Sombreuil was guillotined at the Place du Trône Renversé on 17 June 1794. Because of the d'Herbois charge, the general was obliged to wear a red blouse marking him as an accused would-be parricide. The bodies of the two Sombreuils were amongst fifty-three victims of the guillotine buried in a mass grave in what is now the Picpus Cemetery.

=== Fate of family ===
His youngest son Charles Eugène Gabriel de Sombreuil was one of the commanders of an emigre counter-revolutionary force that made an abortive landing at Quiberon in 1795. Charles was amongst 750 royalists prisoners subsequently executed by firing squad on 28 July, at the orders of Lazare Hoche. Mademoiselle de Sombreuil eventually married in 1796, and died in May 1823.

== Children ==
- Maurille de Sombreuil
- Stanislas Virot de Sombreuil
- Charles Eugène Gabriel de Sombreuil
