= Walter William Ouless =

British painter (1848–1933)

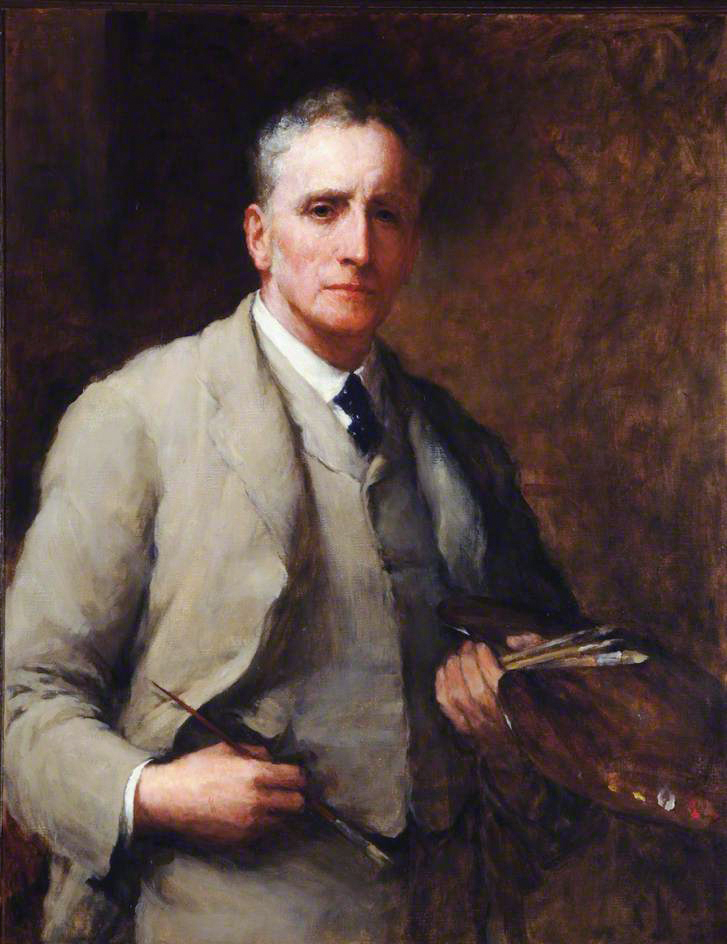
- Self-portrait (1918)
- Born: 21 September 1848; Saint Helier, Jersey
- Died: 25 December 1933 (aged 85); London, England
- Known for: Portrait painting

Walter William Ouless RA (21 September 1848 – 25 December 1933) was a British portrait painter from Jersey. He became an Associate of the Royal Academy (ARA) in 1877 and a full member (RA) in 1881.

== Life and career ==
He was born in 1848 at 53 Paradise Row, New Street, Saint Helier, at the home where his father, marine artist Philip John Ouless, had established his studio in the previous year. His mother was Caroline Savage. He was educated at Victoria College and went to London in 1864, where he entered the Royal Academy schools in 1865. His earliest work was in the field of genre painting, but his compatriot Millais advised him to concentrate on portrait painting, in which field he established a successful career. In later life he turned to landscape painting.

Ouless was "one of the best-known portraitists of the latter years of the nineteenth century", regarded as an "impressive exponent of character".

He was a volunteer in the Artists Rifles. His daughter Catherine Ouless (1879–1961) also achieved success as an artist. He was a member of the Athenaeum Club, London.

== Exhibitions ==
Ouless exhibited at the Royal Academy from 1869, in the British Section of the Chicago Exhibition of 1893, and of the Paris Exhibition of 1900.

== Gallery ==
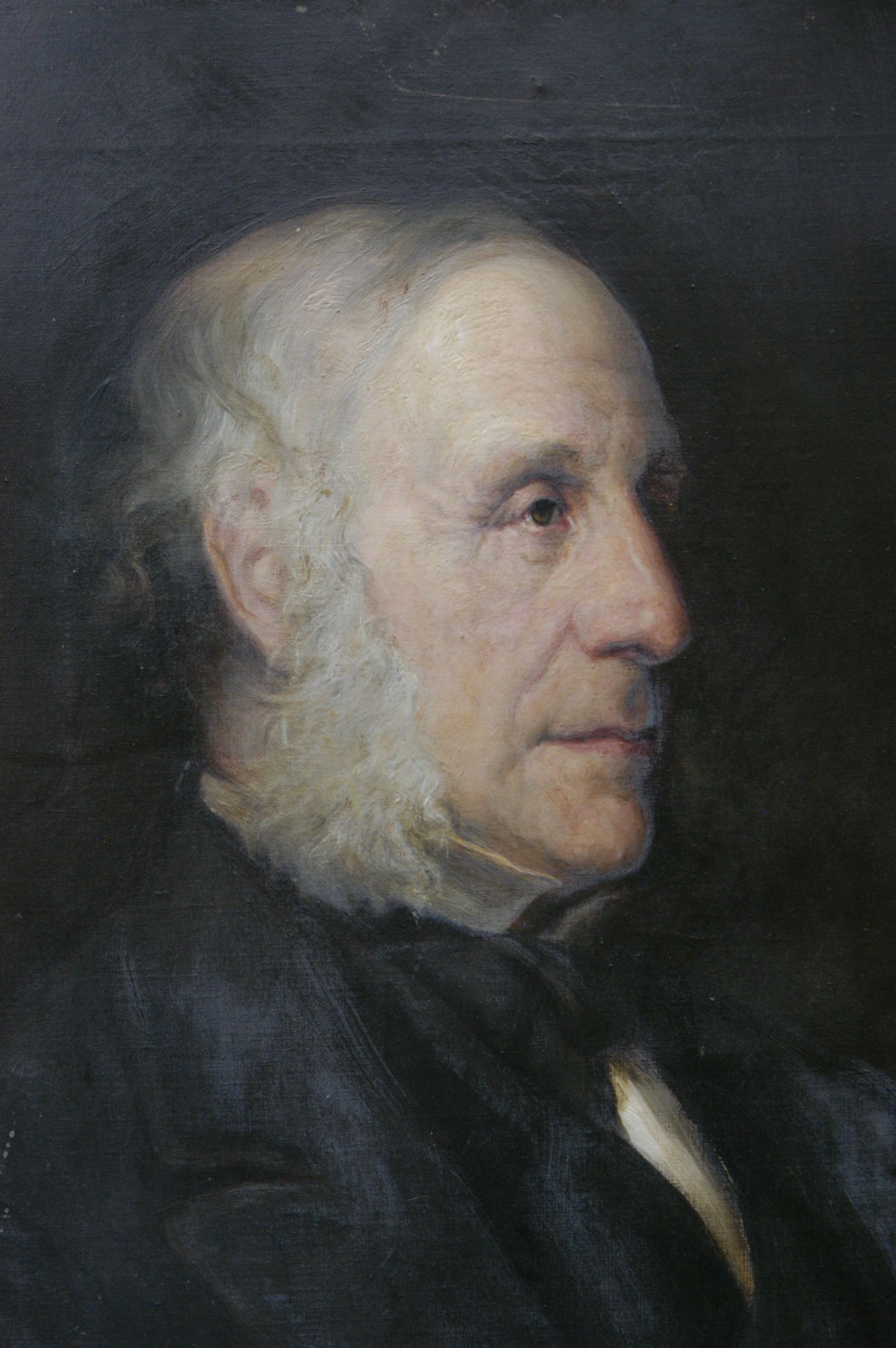
_{Detail of the portrait of William Fane De Salis presented to him by the London Chartered Bank of Australia in 1880}

Portrait of Henry Stacy Marks (1875)

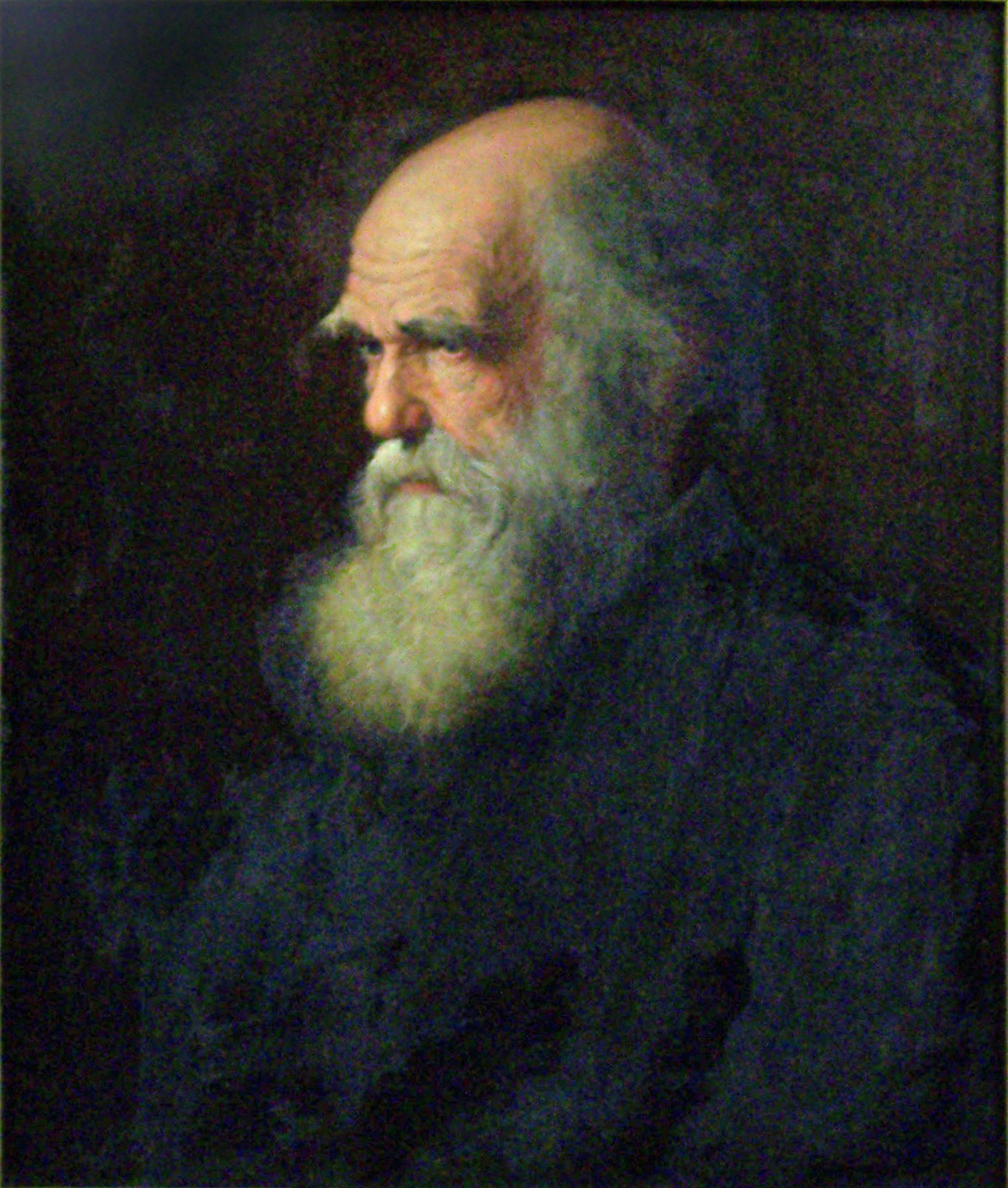
_{Portrait of Charles Darwin (1875)}

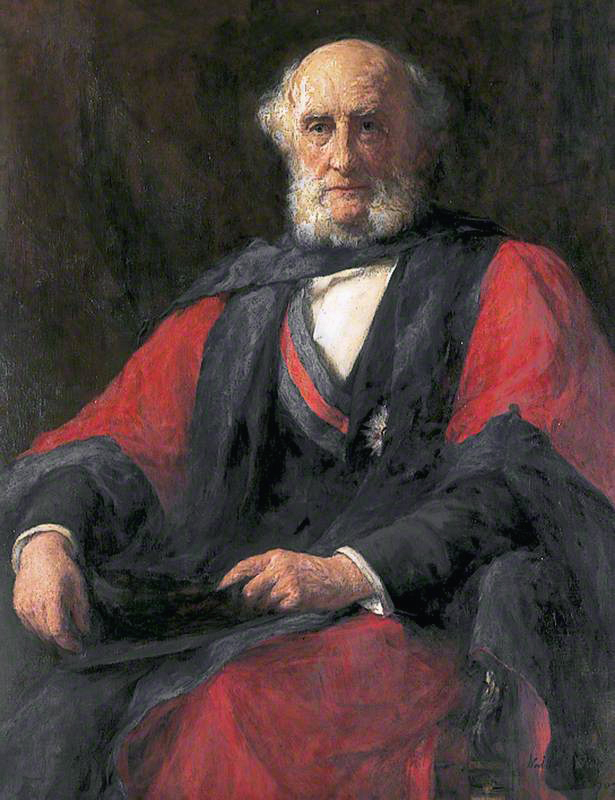
_{Portrait of Sir Donald Currie (1907)}
