= Cécile Renault =

French royalist

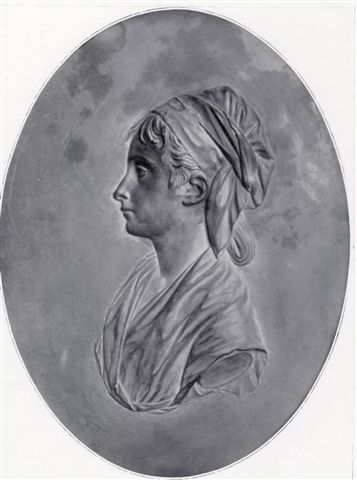
Cécile Renault at the revolutionary tribunal, medallion after a design by Pajou fils.

Cécile-Aimée Renault (1774–1794) was a French woman and royalist accused of trying to assassinate Maximilien Robespierre during the Reign of Terror with two penknives. She was sentenced to death and guillotined on 17 June 1794 in what is now Place de la Nation.

== Assassination attempt ==
Born in 1774 in Paris, Renault was the daughter of a paper maker, and Maximilien Robespierre's name was frequently printed upon his products and a frequent part of her early life.

Renault approached the home of Robespierre on the evening of 22 May 1794, carrying a parcel, a basket, and extra clothing under her arm that hid her weapons. She was able to successfully enter Robespierre's home because of her young countenance and age, being only about 20 years old at the time. Robespierre's guards initially allowed Renault to see him but required her to wait for several hours inside the deputy's antechamber.

Upon waiting for several hours and becoming impatient, Renault demanded her hosts have Robespierre meet with her immediately, arguing that "a public man ought to receive at all times those who have occasion to approach him." When arrested she said she had been merely curious to see "what a tyrant looks like." She also claimed to her captors that she would "rather have one king than fifty thousand." Other sources vary in, some quoting that Renault "preferred to have one king than sixty."

Robespierre's guards searched Renault's clothing and basket and found two knives purposed to kill Robespierre, miscellaneous papers, and a change of clothing. After placing her under arrest, Robespierre and his guards correlated this assassination attempt to recent attempts during the Reign of Terror. This included most notably the assassination of Jean-Paul Marat by Charlotte Corday in 1793. Renault's interrogators also suggested that her assassination plot was a retaliation effort. Her lover had recently been sentenced to death via guillotine by the Committee of Public Safety.

== Trial and execution ==
Renault was arrested for the attempted murder of Robespierre on 23 May, one day after the attempted assassination of Collot d'Herbois. In addition to the two penknives that she brought to attack Robespierre, Renault had also carried a change of underwear in her bag. She said the fresh linen was for her execution. Renault's trial was overseen by Antoine Quentin Fouquier-Tinville, who was heckled by Renault regarding the charges. Renault mocked the council conducting her trial as well. Renault also insisted that "she never designed harm against any living being." Robespierre included Renault's father, a brother and aunt in her trial, noting them as accomplices to the assassination attempt. All three were sentenced to death.

She was executed together with three family members and 50 others on 17 June; executioner Charles-Henri Sanson left the scaffold sick. It is unclear how many of them were related to her or not related at all. Two brothers, joining the Army of the Rhine seem to have escaped to the Black Forest. Renault, her family members, and other associates who knew her but were all unknowing of the assassination plot were given red smock to wear as a mark of assassins and murderers. Her admittance to being a Royalist supporter is considered to support the existence of her hidden knives.

Renault was said to have shown distress only briefly during her climb to the scaffold. She then smiled, and approached the scaffold gleefully when her turn at the guillotine arrived. The execution of Cecile Renault and with 53 so-called accomplices, under whom three family members, was seen by the Committee of Public Safety as a Royalist conspiracy. Robespierre used this assassination attempt against him as a pretext for scapegoating the British.
