= Bonnac-la-Côte =

- Commune
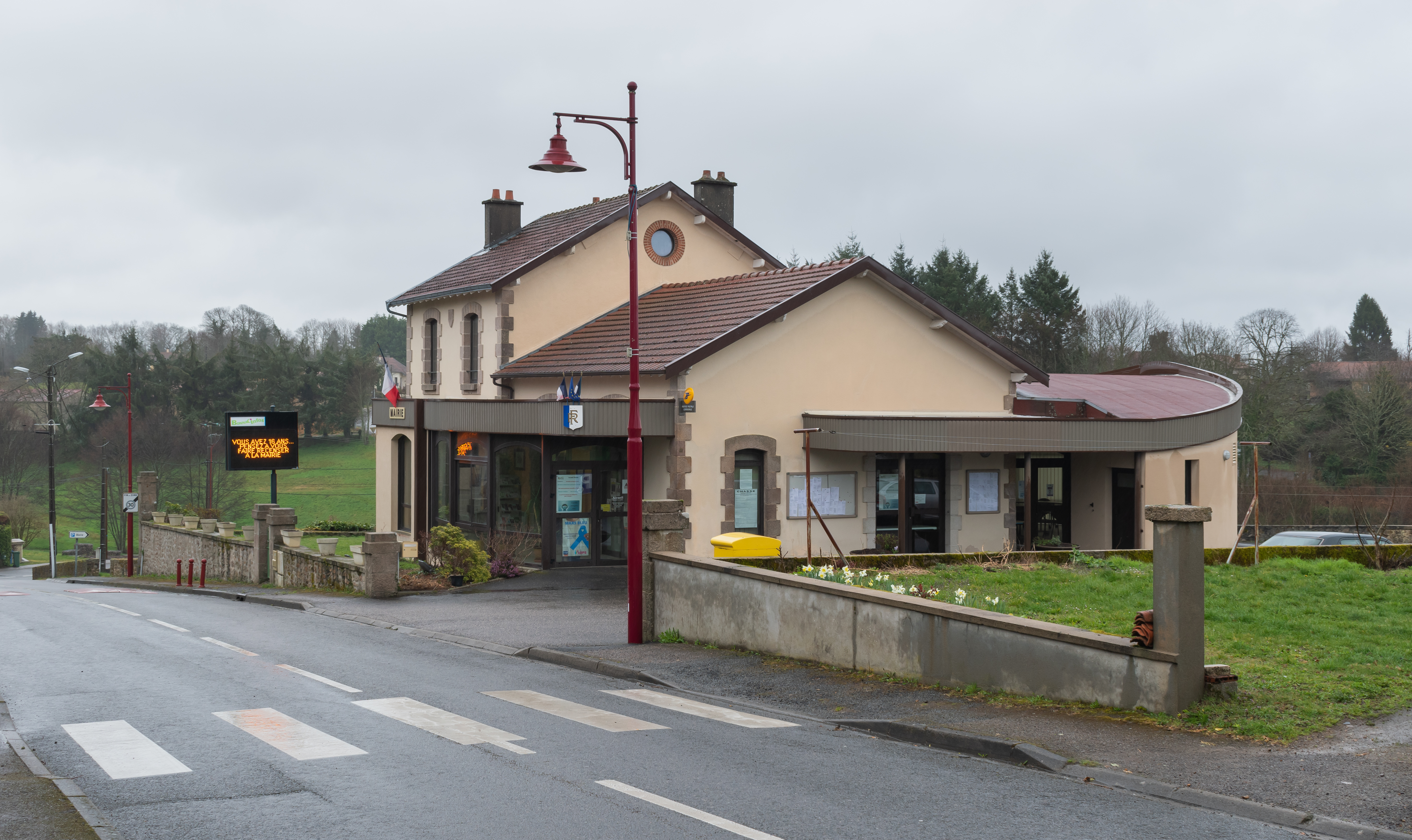
- Town hall of Bonnac-la-Côte

- Coat of arms
- Location of Bonnac-la-Côte
- Location within France Location within Nouvelle-Aquitaine
- Coordinates: 45°56′32″N 1°17′08″E
- Country: France
- Region: Nouvelle-Aquitaine
- Department: Haute-Vienne
- Arrondissement: Limoges
- Canton: Ambazac
- Intercommunality: CU Limoges Métropole

Government
  - Mayor (2020–2026): Claude Brunaud
- Area^{1}: 26.06 km^{2} (10.06 sq mi)
- Highest elevation: 560 m (1,840 ft)
- Lowest elevation: 324 m (1,063 ft)
- Population (2023): 1,631
  - Density: 62.59/km^{2} (162.1/sq mi)
- Time zone: UTC+01:00 (CET)
  - Summer (DST): UTC+02:00 (CEST)
- INSEE/Postal code: 87020 /87270
- ^{1} French Land Register data, which excludes lakes, ponds, glaciers > 1 km^{2} (0.386 sq mi or 247 acres) and river estuaries.

Bonnac-la-Côte (French pronunciation: [bɔnak la kot]; Occitan: Bonac) is a commune in the Haute-Vienne department in the Nouvelle-Aquitaine region in western France.

Inhabitants are known as Bonnacois in French.

== See also ==
- Communes of the Haute-Vienne department
