= Marc David Alba Lasource =

French statesman

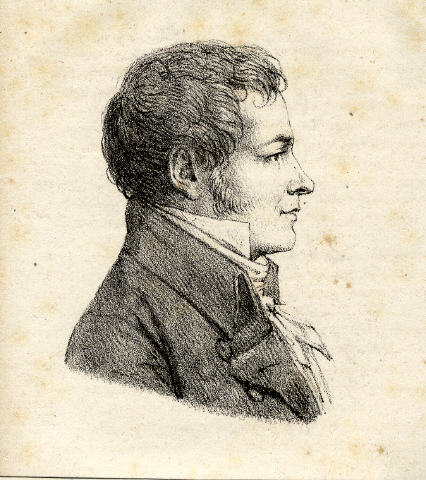

16th President of the National Convention
- In office 18 April – 2 May 1793
- Preceded by: Jean-François-Bertrand Delmas
- Succeeded by: Jean-Baptiste Boyer-Fonfrède

Personal details
- Born: 22 January 1763 Anglès, Tarn, Kingdom of France
- Died: 31 October 1793 (aged 37) Paris, France
- Cause of death: Execution by Guillotine
- Party: Girondins

Marc-David Alba also known as Marc-David Lasource (French pronunciation: [maʁk david lazuʁs]; 22 January 1763 – 31 October 1793) was a French statesman during the French Revolution, and a supporter of the Girondist faction during the National Convention.

== Biography ==
Born in Anglès, in the Department of Tarn in southwest France. A Huguenot, he studied theology at the seminary of Lausanne, Switzerland and received a certificate of consecration on 18 June 1784. He went on to hold the position of secretary at the provincial synod of Haut-Languedoc (1 May 1788) and served as a Protestant minister at Castres

Elected (30 August 1791) as a representative of the Department of Tarn to the Legislative Assembly (1791–1792). He was appointed a member of the Extraordinary Commission of Twelve (12 August 1792 - 21 September 1792)

Alba was elected (3 September 1792) to the National Convention (1792–1793) once again as a deputy for Tarn, and he developed ties with the Girondist faction. He nevertheless voted for the death sentence in the trial of Louis XVI. He was sent on a mission to Nice, a city recently conquered by the French armies, and called its unification with France. He also served as a member of the Committee of General Security (24 January 1793 - April 1793) and as President of the National Convention (18 April 1793 - 2 May 1793). He made many powerful enemies, including Georges Danton, whom he accused of complicity in the treason of General Dumouriez (1 Apr 1793). With the fall of the Girondists he was proscribed (2 June 1793) and removed from the Convention, and ultimately condemned to death by the revolutionary tribunal (30 October 1793); guillotined (31 October 1793).

== Note on his name ==
In some sources, his first name is recorded as Marie-David; La Source (Lasource) is a nom de guerre adopted by Alba as a Protestant priest prosecuted by official authorities. Jean Bon Saint-André and Jean-Paul Rabaut Saint-Étienne changed their names under similar circumstance.
