= List of presidents of the National Convention =

1792-95 French heads of state

President of the National Convention
- National Convention
- Style: Citizen President
- Status: Presiding officer
- Seat: Salle du Manège, Paris
- Term length: 14 days
- Formation: 20 September 1792
- First holder: Jérôme Pétion de Villeneuve
- Final holder: Jean Joseph Victor Génissieu
- Abolished: 26 October 1795

From 22 September 1792 to 2 November 1795, the French Republic was governed by the National Convention, whose president (elected from within for a 14-day term) may be considered as France's legitimate head of state during this period. Historians generally divide the Convention's activities into three periods, moderate, radical, and reaction, and the policies of presidents of the Convention reflect these distinctions. During the radical and reaction phases, some of the presidents were executed, most by guillotine, committed suicide, or were deported. In addition, some of the presidents were later deported during the Bourbon Restoration in 1815.

== Establishment of the Convention ==
The National Convention governed France from 20 September 1792 until 26 October 1795 during the most critical period of the French Revolution. The election of the National Convention took place in September 1792 after the election of the electoral colleges by primary regional assemblies on 26 August. Owing to the abstention of aristocrats and the anti-republicans, and the general fear of victimization, the voter turnout in the departments was low – as little as 7.5 percent or as much as 11.9% of the electorate, compared to 10.2% in the 1791 elections, despite the doubling of the number of eligible voters.

Initially elected to provide a new constitution after the overthrow of the monarchy on 10 August 1792, the Convention included 749 deputies drawn from businesses and trades, and from such professions as law, journalism, medicine, and the clergy. Among its earliest acts was the formal abolition of the monarchy, through Proclamation, on 21 September, and the subsequent establishment of the Republic on 22 September. The French Republican Calendar discarded all Christian reference points and calculated time from the Republic's first full day after the monarchy – 22 September 1792, the first day of Year One.

According to its own rules, the Convention elected its president every fortnight (two weeks). He was eligible for re-election after the lapse of a fortnight. Ordinarily the sessions were held in the morning, but evening sessions also occurred frequently, often extending late into the night. In exceptional circumstances, the Convention declared itself in permanent session and sat for several days without interruption. For both legislative and administrative deliberations, the Convention used committees, with powers more or less widely extended and regulated by successive laws. The most famous of these committees included the Committee of Public Safety and the Committee of General Security.

The Convention held both legislative and executive powers during the first years of the French First Republic and had three distinct periods: Girondins (moderate), Montagnard (radical) and Thermidorian (reaction). The Montagnards favored granting the poorer classes more political power; the Girondins favored a bourgeois republic and wanted to reduce the power and influence of Paris over the course of the revolution. A popular uprising in Paris helped to purge the Convention of the Girondins between 31 May and 2 June 1793; the last of the Girondins served as presidents in late July.

In its second phase, the Montagnards controlled the convention (June 1793 to July 1794). War and an internal rebellion convinced the revolutionary government to establish a Committee of Public Safety which exercised near dictatorial power. Consequently, the democratic constitution, approved by the convention on 24 June 1793, did not go into effect and the Convention lost its legislative initiative. The rise of Mountaineers (Montagnards) corresponded with the decline of the Girondins. The Girondin party had hesitated on the correct course of action to take with Louis XVI after his attempt to flee France on 20 June 1791. Some elements of the Girondin party believed they could use the king as figurehead. While the Girondins hesitated, the Montagnards took a united stand during the trial in December 1792 – January 1793 and favored the king’s execution. Riding on this victory, the Montagnards then sought to discredit the Girondins using tactics previously used against themselves, denouncing the Girondins as liars and enemies of the Revolution. The last quarter of the year was marked by the Reign of Terror (5 September 1793 – 28 July 1794), also known as The Terror (French: la Terreur), a period of violence incited by conflict between these rival political factions, the Girondins and the Jacobins, and marked by mass executions of "enemies of the revolution". The death toll ranged in the tens of thousands, with 16,594 executed by guillotine (2,639 in Paris), and another 25,000 in summary executions across France. Most of the Parisian victims of the guillotine filled the Madeleine, Mosseaux (also called Errancis), and Picpus cemeteries.

In the third phase, called Thermidor after the month in which it began, many of the members of the Convention overthrew the most prominent member of the committee, Maximilien Robespierre. This reaction to the radical influence of the Committee of Public Safety reestablished the balance of power in the hands of the moderate deputies. The Girondins who had survived the 1793 purge were recalled and the leading Montagnards were themselves purged, and many executed. In August 1795, the Convention approved the Constitution for the regime that replaced it, the bourgeois-dominated Directory, which exercised power from 1795 to 1799, when a coup d'etat by Napoleon Bonaparte overthrew it.

== Moderate phase (1792–1793) ==
Initially, La Marais, or The Plain, a moderate, amorphous group, controlled the Convention. At the first session, held on 20 September 1792, the elder statesman Philippe Rühl presided over the session. The following day, amidst profound silence, the proposition was put to the assembly, "That royalty be abolished in France"; it carried, with cheers. On the 22nd came the news of the Republic's victory at the Battle of Valmy. On the same day, the Convention decreed that "in future, the acts of the assembly shall be dated First Year of the French Republic". Three days later, the Convention added the corollary of "the French republic is one and indivisible", to guard against federalism.

The following men were elected for two-week terms as presidents, or executives, of the Convention.

Portrait	Name (Born–Died)	Term of office			Political party
Portrait	Name (Born–Died)	Took office	Left office	Time in office	Political party
	Jérôme Pétion de Villeneuve (1756–1794)	20 September 1792	4 October 1792	14 days	Girondins
	Jean-François Delacroix (1753–1794)	4 October 1792	18 October 1792	14 days	The Mountain
	Marguerite-Élie Guadet (1758–1794)	18 October 1792	1 November 1792	14 days	Girondins
	Marie-Jean Hérault de Séchelles (1759–1794)	1 November 1792	15 November 1792	14 days	The Mountain
	Henri Grégoire (1750–1831)	15 November 1792	29 November 1792	14 days	The Plain
	Bertrand Barère (1755–1841)	29 November 1792	13 December 1792	14 days	The Plain
	Jacques Defermon des Chapelières (1756–1831)	13 December 1792	27 December 1792	14 days	Girondins
	Jean-Baptiste Treilhard (1742–1810)	27 December 1792	10 January 1793	14 days	The Plain
	Pierre Victurnien Vergniaud (1753–1793)	10 January 1793	24 January 1793	14 days	Girondins
	Jean-Paul Rabaut Saint-Étienne (1743–1793)	24 January 1793	7 February 1793	14 days	Girondins
	Jean-Jacques Bréard (1751–1840)	7 February 1793	21 February 1793	14 days	The Mountain
	Edmond Louis Alexis Dubois-Crancé (1747–1814)	21 February 1793	7 March 1793	14 days	The Mountain
	Armand Gensonné (1758–1793)	7 March 1793	21 March 1793	14 days	Girondins
	Jean Debry (1760–1834)	21 March 1793	4 April 1793	14 days	The Plain
	Jean-François-Bertrand Delmas (1751–1798)	4 April 1793 (Note: From 9 Apr 1793 to 18 Apr 1793 the functions of president were exercised by vice-president Jacques-Alexis Thuriot de la Rosière. He was elected president in his own right for the fortnight 27 June 1793 – 11 July 1793)	18 April 1793	14 days	The Mountain
	Marc David Alba Lasource (1763–1793)	18 April 1793	2 May 1793	14 days	Girondins
	Jean-Baptiste Boyer-Fonfrède (1760–1793)	2 May 1793	16 May 1793	14 days	Girondins
	Maximin Isnard (1755–1825)	16 May 1793	30 May 1793	14 days	Girondins
	François René Mallarmé (1755–1835)	30 May 1793	13 June 1793	14 days	The Mountain

At the end of May 1793, an uprising of the Parisian sans culottes, the day-laborers and working class, undermined much of the authority of the moderate Girondins. At this point, although Danton and Hérault de Séchelles both served one more term each as Presidents of the Convention, the Girondins had lost control of the Convention: in June and July compromise after compromise changed the course of the revolution from a bourgeois event to a radical, working class event. Price controls were introduced and a minimum wage guaranteed to workers and soldiers. Over the course of the summer, the government became truly revolutionary.

== Radical phase (1793–1794) ==
After the insurrection, any attempted resistance to revolutionary ideals was crushed. The insurrection of 31 May – 2 June 1793 marked a significant milestone in the history of the French Revolution. The days of 31 May – 2 June (French: journées) resulted in the fall of the Girondin party under pressure of the Parisian sans-culottes, Jacobins of the clubs, and Montagnards in the National Convention. The following men were elected as presidents of the Convention during its transition from its moderate to radical phase.

Portrait	Name (Born–Died)	Term of office			Political party
Portrait	Name (Born–Died)	Took office	Left office	Time in office	Political party
	Jean-Marie Collot d'Herbois (1749–1796)	13 June 1793	27 June 1793	14 days	The Mountain
	Jacques Alexis Thuriot de la Rosière (1753–1829)	27 June 1793	11 July 1793	14 days	The Mountain
	Andre Jeanbon Saint Andre (1749–1813)	11 July 1793	25 July 1793	14 days	The Mountain
	Georges Jacques Danton (1759–1794)	25 July 1793	8 August 1793	14 days	The Mountain
	Marie-Jean Hérault de Séchelles (1759–1794)	8 August 1793	22 August 1793	14 days	The Mountain

The following men were elected as presidents of the Convention during its radical phase.

Portrait	Name (Born–Died)	Term of office			Political party
Portrait	Name (Born–Died)	Took office	Left office	Time in office	Political party
	Maximilien Robespierre (1758–1794)	22 August 1793	5 September 1793	14 days	The Mountain
	Jacques-Nicolas Billaud-Varenne (1756–1819)	5 September 1793	19 September 1793	14 days	The Mountain
	Pierre Joseph Cambon (1756–1820)	19 September 1793	3 October 1793	14 days	The Mountain
	Louis-Joseph Charlier (1754–1797)	3 October 1793	22 October 1793	19 days	The Mountain
	Moïse Antoine Pierre Jean Bayle (1755–1815)	22 October 1793	6 November 1793	15 days	The Mountain
	Pierre-Antoine Lalloy (1749–1846)	6 November 1793	21 November 1793	15 days	The Mountain
	Charles-Gilbert Romme (1750–1795)	21 November 1793	6 December 1793	15 days	The Mountain
	Jean-Henri Voulland (1751–1801)	6 December 1793	21 December 1793	15 days	The Mountain
	Georges Auguste Couthon (1755–1794)	21 December 1793	5 January 1794	15 days	The Mountain
	Jacques-Louis David (1748–1825)	5 January 1794	20 January 1794	15 days	The Mountain
	Marc Guillaume Alexis Vadier (1736–1828)	20 January 1794	4 February 1794	15 days	The Mountain
	Joseph-Nicolas Barbeau du Barran (1761–1816)	4 February 1794	19 February 1794	15 days	The Mountain
	Louis Antoine de Saint-Just (1767–1794)	19 February 1794	6 March 1794	15 days	The Mountain
	Philippe Rühl (1737–1795)	7 March 1794	21 March 1794	14 days	The Mountain
	Jean-Lambert Tallien (1767–1820)	21 March 1794	5 April 1794	15 days	The Mountain
	Jean-Baptiste-André Amar (1755–1816)	5 April 1794	20 April 1794	15 days	The Mountain
	Robert Lindet (1746–1825)	20 April 1794	5 May 1794	15 days	The Mountain
	Lazare Carnot (1753–1823)	5 May 1794	20 May 1794	15 days	The Mountain
	Claude-Antoine Prieur-Duvernois (1763–1832)	20 May 1794	4 June 1794	15 days	The Mountain
	Maximilien Robespierre (1758–1794)	4 June 1794	19 June 1794	15 days	The Mountain
	Élie Lacoste (1745–1806)	19 June 1794	5 July 1794	16 days	The Mountain
	Jean-Antoine Louis (1742–1796)	5 July 1794	19 July 1794	14 days	The Mountain

== Reaction (1794–1795) ==
On 27 July 1794, the National Convention voted for the arrest of Maximilien Robespierre, Louis Antoine de Saint-Just, and several allies, and they were executed the following day. This ended the most radical phase of the French Revolution. (Note: The name Thermidorian refers to 9 Thermidor Year II (27 July 1794), the date according to the French Revolutionary Calendar when Robespierre and other radical revolutionaries came under concerted attack in the National Convention. Thermidorian Reaction also refers to the remaining period until the National Convention was superseded by the Directory; this is also sometimes called the era of the Thermidorian Convention. Prominent figures of Thermidor include Paul Barras, Jean-Lambert Tallien, and Joseph Fouché. Neely, pp. 225–227.)

The following men were presidents of the Convention until its end.

Image	Dates	Name	DOD/Fate
	19 July 1794 – 3 August 1794	Jean-Marie Collot d'Herbois	8 June 1796
	3 August 1794 – 18 August 1794	Philippe Antoine Merlin, dit Merlin de Douai	26 December 1838
	18 August 1794 – 2 September 1794	Antoine Merlin de Thionville	14 September 1833
	2 September 1794 – 22 September 1794	André Antoine Bernard, dit Bernard de Saintes	19 October 1818
	22 September 1794 – 7 October 1794	André Dumont	19 October 1838
	7 October 1794 – 22 October 1794	Jean-Jacques-Régis de Cambacérès	8 March 1824; One of the few members of La Marais to be elected President; Authored Napoleon's Civil Code
	22 October 1794 – 6 November 1794	Pierre-Louis Prieur, dit Prieur de la Marne	31 May 1827
	6 November 1794 – 24 November 1794	Louis Legendre	13 December 1797, died of natural causes (dementia)
	24 November 1794 – 6 December 1794	Jean-Baptiste Clauzel	2 July 1803
	6 December 1794 – 21 December 1794	Jean-François Reubell	23 November 1807
	21 December 1794 – 6 January 1795	Pierre-Louis Bentabole	22 April 1798
	6 January 1795 – 20 January 1795	Étienne-François Le Tourneur	4 October 1817
	20 January 1795 – 4 February 1795	Stanislas Joseph François Xavier Rovère	died in 1798 in French Guiana
	4 February 1795 – 19 February 1795	Paul Barras	29 January 1829
	19 February 1795 – 6 March 1795	François Louis Bourdon	22 June 1798, after being deported to French Guiana
	6 March 1795 – 24 March 1795	Antoine Claire Thibaudeau	8 March 1854
	24 March 1795 – 5 April 1795	Jean Pelet, also Pelet de la Lozère	26 January 1842
	5 April 1795 – 20 April 1795	François-Antoine de Boissy d'Anglas	1828; One of the few members of La Marais to be elected President
	20 April 1795 – 5 May 1795	Emmanuel Joseph Sieyès	20 June 1836; One of the few members of La Marais to be elected President
	5 May 1795 – 26 May 1795	Théodore Vernier	3 February 1818
	26 May 1795 – 4 June 1795	Jean-Baptiste Charles Matthieu	31 October 1833
	4 June 1795 – 19 June 1795	Jean Denis, comte Lanjuinais	died in 1828 in Paris
	19 June 1795 – 4 July 1795	Jean-Baptiste Louvet de Couvray	25 August 1797
	4 July 1795 – 19 July 1795	Louis-Gustave Doulcet de Pontécoulant	17 November 1764 – 3 April 1853
	19 July 1795 – 3 August 1795	Louis-Marie de La Révellière-Lépeaux	24 March 1824
	3 August 1795 – 19 August 1795	Pierre Claude François Daunou	20 June 1840
	19 August 1795 – 2 September 1795	Marie-Joseph Chénier	10 January 1811
	2 September 1795 – 23 September 1795	Théophile Berlier	12 September 1844
	23 September 1795 – 8 October 1795	Pierre-Charles-Louis Baudin	1799
	8 October 1795 – 26 October 1795	Jean Joseph Victor Génissieu	27 October 1804

== Successor organization ==
The Directory (French: Directoire) was the government of France following the collapse of the National Convention in late 1795. Administered by a collective leadership of five directors, it preceded the Consulate established in a coup d'etat by Napoleon. It lasted from 2 November 1795 until 10 November 1799, a period commonly known as the "Directory era". The directory operated with a bicameral structure. A Council of the Ancients, selected by lot, named the directors. For its own security, the Left (whose members dominated the Council) resolved that all five must be old members of the Convention and regicides who had voted to execute King Louis XVI. The Ancients chose Jean-François Rewbell; Paul François Jean Nicolas, vicomte de Barras; Louis Marie de La Révellière-Lépeaux; Lazare Nicolas Marguerite Carnot; and Étienne-François Le Tourneur.

== See also ==
- Ministers of the French National Convention
- Representative on mission
- Full list of members of the Convention per department: List of Members of the National Convention by Department (French)

== Sources ==
- Editors, "National Convention" and "Reign of Terror." The Encyclopædia Britannica, 2015, Accessed 22 April 2014.
- Alderson, Robert. This Bright Era of Happy Revolutions: French Consul. U. of South Carolina Press, 2008. OCLC 192109705
- Doyle, William. The Oxford History of the French Revolution. 2nd edition. Oxford University Press, 2002. OCLC 490913480
- Cheynet, Pierre-Dominique. France: Members of the Executive Directory: 1792–1793, and 1793–1795. Archontology.org 2013, Accessed 19 February 2015.
- (in French) Dupuy, Roger. La République jacobine. Terreur, guerre et gouvernement révolutionnaire (1792—1794). Paris, Le Seuil, 2005. ISBN 2-02-039818-4
- Furet, François. The French Revolution: 1770–1814. Oxford, Blackwell Publishers Ltd, 1996. OCLC 25094935
- Fleischmann, Hector, Behind the Scenes in the Terror, NY, Brentano's, 1915. OCLC 499613
- (in French) Garnier, Jean-Claude; Jean-Pierre Mohen. Cimetières autour du monde: Un désir d'éternité. Paris, Editions Errance. 2003. OCLC 417420035
- Greer, Donald. The Incidence of the Terror during the French Revolution: A Statistical Interpretation. Cambridge (United States C.A), Harvard University Press, 1951. OCLC 403511
- Linton, Marisa. Choosing Terror: Virtue, Friendship, and Authenticity in the French Revolution Oxford U.P., 2013. OCLC 829055558
- Neeley, Sylvia. A Concise History of the French Revolution, Lanham, Rowman & Littlefield, 2008. OCLC 156874791
- Popkin, Jeremy D. A Short History of the French Revolution. 5th ed. Upper Saddle River, Pearson, 2009. OCLC 36739547
- Smitha, Frank E. Macrohistory: Fear, Overreaction and War (1792–93). 2009–2015 version. Accessed 21 April 2015.
- Thompson, J.M. The French Revolution. Oxford, Basil Blackwell, 1959. OCLC 1052771
