= Committee of Public Safety =

De facto executive government in France (1793–1794)

- Comité de salut public (French)

- Type: Provisional government
- Status: Disestablished
- Appointer: National Convention
- Constituting instrument: National Convention
- Formation: 6 April 1793
- Abolished: 25 October 1795
- Succession: Executive Directory

The Committee of Public Safety (French: Comité de salut public) was a committee of the National Convention which formed the provisional government and war cabinet during the Reign of Terror, a violent phase of the French Revolution. Supplementing the Committee of General Defence, created early January 1793, the Committee of Public Safety was created on 6 April 1793 by the National Convention. It was charged with protecting the new republic against its foreign and domestic enemies, fighting the First Coalition and the Vendée revolt. As a wartime measure, the committee was given broad supervisory and administrative powers over the armed forces, judiciary and legislature, as well as the executive bodies and ministers of the convention.

As the committee, restructured in July, raised the defense (levée en masse) against the monarchist coalition of European nations and counter-revolutionary forces within France, it became more and more powerful. In December 1793, the Convention formally conferred executive power upon the committee. Among the members, the radical Montagnard Jacobin Maximilien Robespierre was one of the most well-known, though he did not have any special powers or privileges. After the arrest and execution of the rival factions of Hébertists and Dantonists, sentiment in the Convention eventually turned against Robespierre, who was executed in July 1794. In the following Thermidorian Reaction, the committee's influence diminished after 15 months and it disappeared on the same day as the National Convention, which was 25 October 1795, but it probably continued until the end of the month.

== Origins and evolution ==
=== Social climate of Revolutionary France ===
The French Revolution brought about an immense shift in society in which citizens desired to bring about a new age of critical rationality, egalitarianism, and patriotism amongst French men. Revolutionary ideals were spread throughout France and a belief in democracy and civilian government was heralded as the new era of French civilization. 1793 would bring a new republican constitution, drafted by the National Assembly. The French Constitution of 1793 and its subsequent government would bring sweeping reforms to French politics and the French social order. Major reforms included comprehensive education, the recognition of rights for illegitimate children and improved rights for married women.

The French Constitution of 1793 outlined the prevailing Enlightenment era ideology of the French government at this stage of the revolutionary period. The constitution outlines a right to the resistance of oppression as well as the right to personal liberty. The equality of all French men is detailed as is the structure of the French Republic. The new constitution and the shift into a republican government centered on the National Assembly created the atmosphere for a radicalized governing authority to take power. Members of the French common classes such as the Sans-Culottes turned to radicalism and inspired militant activism among the French populace.

=== Committee Creation ===
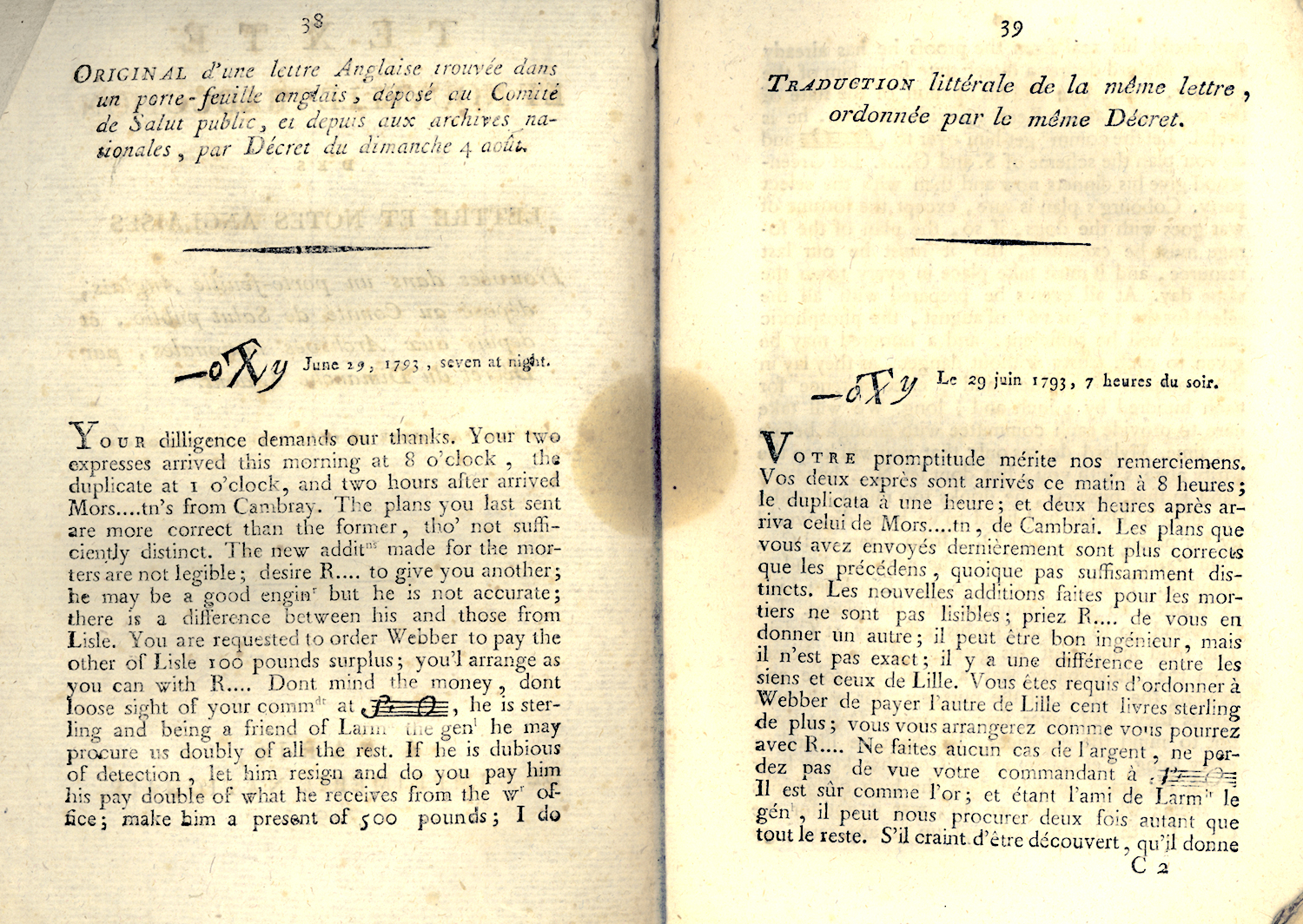
Lettre anglaise (English Letter) dated 29 June 1793 as published by the National Convention during the French Revolution (1793) to prove English spying and conspiracy

A widespread belief held that revolutionary France was in immediate peril, threatened not only by foreign armies and by recent revolts in the Vendée, but also by foreign agents who plotted the destruction of the nation from within. In light of this threat, the Girondin leader Maximin Isnard proposed the creation of a nine-member Committee of Public Safety. Isnard was supported in this effort by Georges Danton, who declared: "This Committee is precisely what we want, a hand to grasp the weapon of the Revolutionary Tribunal".

After a proposal by Bertrand Barère on 18 March the committee was created on 6 April 1793. Closely associated with the leadership of Danton, it was initially known as the Danton Committee. Danton steered the Committee through the 31 May and 2 June 1793 journées that saw the violent expulsion of the Girondins and through the intensifying war in the Vendée. When the committee was recomposed on 10 July 1793, Danton was not included. Nevertheless, he continued to support the centralization of power by the committee.

On 27 July 1793, Maximilien Robespierre was elected to the committee. At this time, the committee was entering a more powerful and active phase, alongside its partner, the Committee of General Security. The role of the Committee of Public Safety included the governance of the war (including the appointment of generals), the appointing of judges and juries for the Revolutionary Tribunal, the provisioning of the armies and the public, the maintenance of public order and oversight of the state bureaucracy.

The committee was also responsible for interpreting and applying the decrees of the National Convention and thus for implementing some of the most stringent policies of the Terror—for instance, the levée en masse passed on 23 August 1793, the Law of Suspects passed on 17 September 1793 and the Law of the General Maximum passed on 29 September 1793. The broad and centralized powers of the committee were codified by the Law of 14 Frimaire (also known as the Law of Revolutionary Government) on 4 December 1793.

==== Execution of the Hébertists and Dantonists ====
On 5 December 1793, journalist Camille Desmoulins began publishing Le Vieux Cordelier with the approval of Robespierre and the Committee. This newspaper was initially aimed against the ultrarevolutionary Hébertist faction, whose extremist demands, anti-religious fervor and propensity for sudden insurrections troubled the committee. However, Desmoulins quickly turned his pen against the Committee of Public Safety and the Committee of General Security, comparing their reign to that of the Roman tyrants chronicled by Tacitus and expounding the indulgent views of the Dantonist faction.

Consequently, though the Hébertists were arrested and executed in March 1794, the Committees had Desmoulins and Danton arrested as well. Hérault de Séchelles, a friend and ally of Danton, was expelled from the Committee of Public Safety, arrested and tried alongside them. On 5 April 1794, the Dantonists went to the guillotine.

=== Committee of rule ===
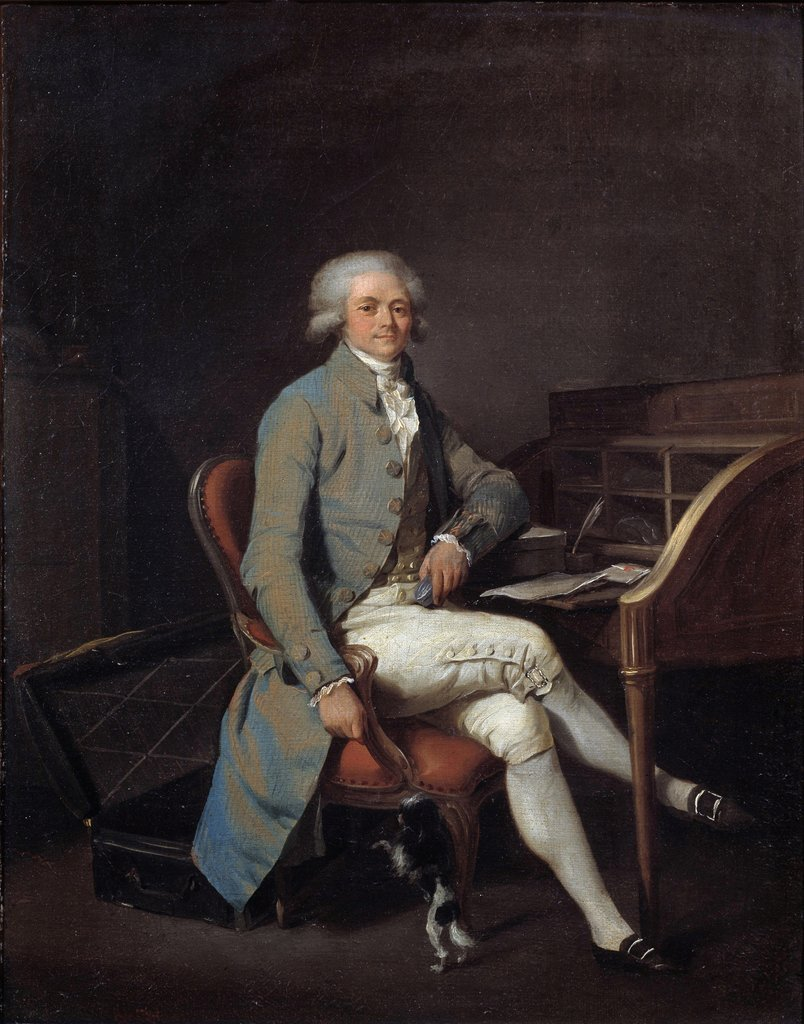
Maximilien Robespierre, member of the Committee of Public Safety

The elimination of the Hébertists and the Dantonists made evident the strength of the Committees to control and silence opposition. The creation in March 1794 of a General Police Bureau—reporting nominally to the Committee of Public Safety—served to increase the power of the Committee of Public Safety.

However, even as the period later known as the 'Terror' reached its height and with it the committee's political power, discord was growing within the revolutionary government. Members of the Committee of General Security resented the aggressive behavior of the Committee of Public Safety and particularly the encroachment of the General Police Bureau upon their own brief. Arguments within the Committee of Public Safety itself had grown so violent that it relocated its meetings to a more private room to preserve the illusion of agreement. On 21 May 1794 the revolutionary government decided that the judicial system would be centralised, with almost all the tribunals in the provinces closed and all the capital trials held in Paris.

The Law of 22 Prairial, proposed by the committee and enacted by the convention on 10 June 1794, went further in establishing the control of the Revolutionary Tribunal and above it the Convention and Committees of Public Safety and General Security. The law enumerated various forms of public enemies, required their denunciation, and severely limited the legal recourse available to those accused. The punishment for all crimes covered under this law was death; from its inception to its removal, more people were condemned to death in Paris than in the entire previous history of the Revolutionary Tribunal. However, this statistic is accentuated by the fact that, as noted previously, all capital trials and sentences were carried out in Paris rather than being scattered across the provinces.

Robespierre, a fervent supporter of the theistic Cult of the Supreme Being, found himself frequently in conflict with anti-religious Committee members Collot d'Herbois and Billaud-Varenne. Moreover, Robespierre's increasingly extensive absences from the Committee due to illness (he all but ceased to attend meetings in June 1794) created the impression among some members that he was isolated and out of touch. Charlotte Robespierre reported in her memoirs that Robespierre had come into conflict with several of the representatives on mission due to their excessive use of violence, which likely also led to the unity of the Committee devolving.

=== Fall of the Committee and aftermath ===
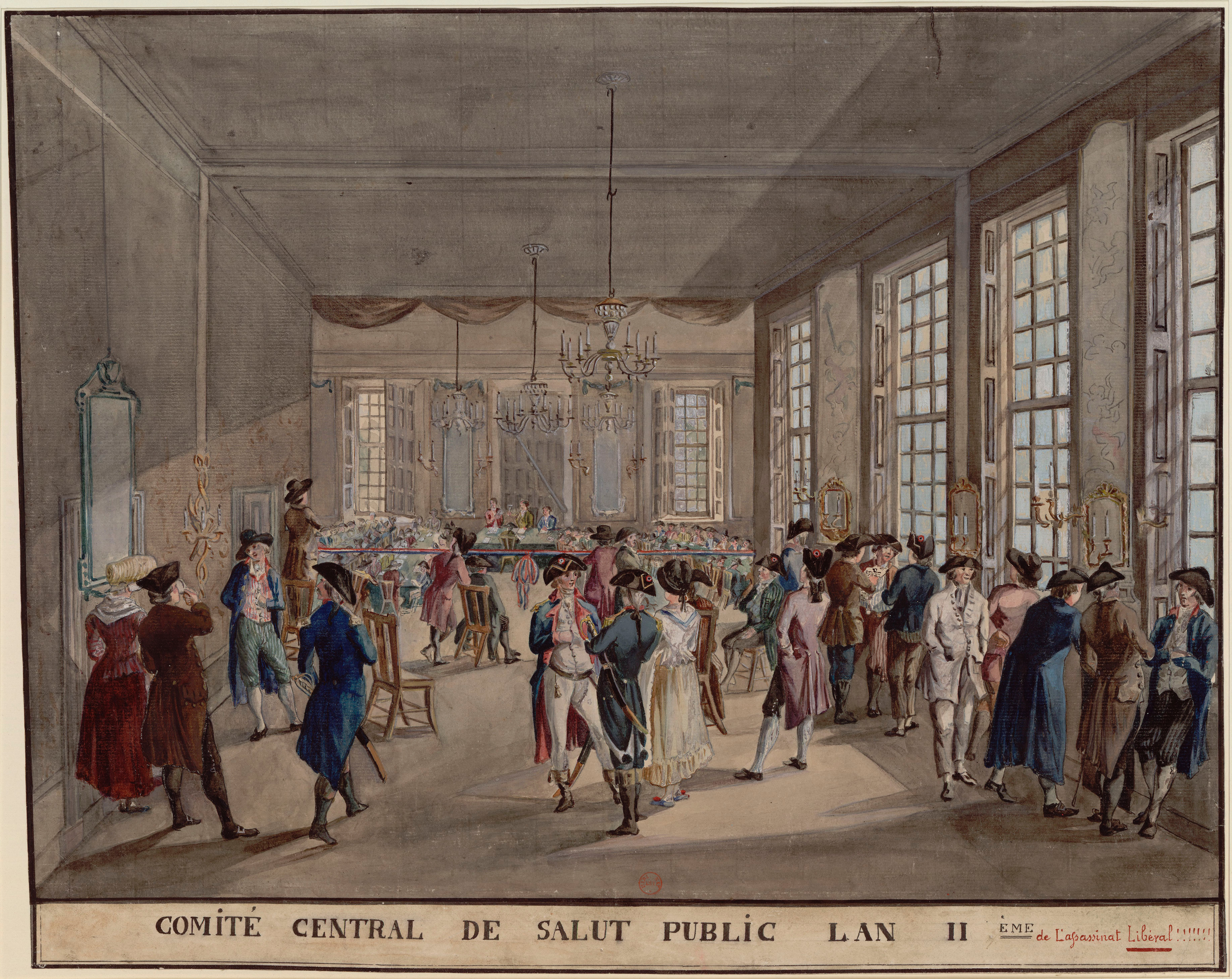
Comité de Salut public, An II

When it became suspected in mid-July 1794 that Robespierre and Saint-Just were planning to strike against their political opponents Joseph Fouché, Jean-Lambert Tallien and Marc-Guillaume Alexis Vadier (the latter two members of the Committee of General Security), the fragile truce within the government was dissolved. Saint-Just and his fellow Committee of Public Safety member Bertrand Barère attempted to keep the peace between the Committees of Public Safety and General Security. However, Robespierre delivered a speech to the National Convention on 26 July 1794 in which he emphasized the need to "purify" the Committees and "crush all factions". In a speech to the Jacobin Club that night, he attacked Collot d'Herbois and Billaud-Varenne, who had refused to allow the printing and distribution of his speech to the convention.

On the following day, 27 July 1794 (9 Thermidor according to the Republican calendar), Saint-Just began to speak before the Convention. However, he was almost immediately interrupted by Tallien and by Billaud-Varenne, who accused him of intending to "murder the Convention". Barère, Vadier and Stanislas Fréron joined the accusations against Saint-Just and Robespierre. The Convention ordered the arrest of Robespierre, his brother Augustin, and Saint-Just, along with that of their supporters, including Philippe Le Bas and Georges Couthon.

A period of intense civil unrest ensued, during which the members of the Committees of Public Safety and General Security were forced to seek refuge in the convention. The Robespierre brothers, Saint-Just, Le Bas and Couthon ensconced themselves in the Hôtel de Ville, attempting to incite an insurrection. Ultimately, faced with defeat and arrest, Le Bas committed suicide, while Saint-Just, Couthon, and Maximilien and Augustin Robespierre were arrested and guillotined on 28 July 1794.

The ensuing period of upheaval, dubbed the Thermidorian Reaction, saw the repeal of many of the previous year's most unpopular laws and the restriction of the Committees of General Security and Public Safety. The Committees ceased to exist under the Constitution of the Year III (1795), which marked the beginning of the Directory.

== Composition ==
=== Committee of General Defence (25 March – 6 April 1793) ===
Party breakdown

- The Mountain (Left) (Enemy of Girondins)
13
- The Girondins (Right) (Enemy of The Mountain)
9
- The Plain (Centre)
3

| Member | Department | Affiliation |
|---|---|---|
| Charles Barbaroux | Bouches-du-Rhône | Girondins |
| Bertrand Barère | Hautes-Pyrénées | Plain |
| Jean-Jacques Bréard | Charente-Inférieure | Mountain |
| François Buzot | Eure | Girondins |
| Jean-Jacques Régis de Cambacérès | Hérault | Plain |
| Armand-Gaston Camus | Haute-Loire | Mountain |
| Nicolas de Condorcet | Aisne | Girondins |
| Georges Danton | Seine | Mountain |
| Jean Debry | Aisne | Mountain |
| Jean-François-Bertrand Delmas | Haute-Garonne | Mountain |
| Camille Desmoulins | Seine | Mountain |
| Edmond Dubois-Crancé | Ardennes | Mountain |
| Fabre d'Églantine | Seine | Mountain |
| Armand Gensonné | Gironde | Girondins |
| Élie Guadet | Gironde | Girondins |
| Louis-Bernard Guyton de Morveau | Côte-d'Or | Mountain |
| Maximin Isnard | Var | Girondins |
| Marc-David Lasource | Tarn | Girondins |
| Jérôme Pétion Jr. | Eure-et-Loir | Girondins |
| Pierre Louis Prieur | Marne | Mountain |
| Nicolas Marie Quinette | Aisne | Mountain |
| Maximilien Robespierre | Seine | Mountain |
| Philippe Rühl | Bas-Rhin | Mountain |
| Emmanuel-Joseph Sieyès | Sarthe | Plain |
| Pierre Vergniaud | Gironde | Girondins |

=== 1st Committee (6 April – 10 July 1793) ===
Party breakdown

- The Mountain (Left)
- The Plain (Centre)
6
3

| Member | Department | Affiliation |
|---|---|---|
| Bertrand Barère | Hautes-Pyrénées | Plain |
| Jean-Jacques Bréard | Charente-Inférieure | Mountain |
| Pierre-Joseph Cambon | Hérault | Plain |
| Georges Danton | Seine | Mountain |
| Jean Debry | Aisne | Mountain |
| Jean-François Delacroix | Eure-et-Loir | Mountain |
| Jean-François-Bertrand Delmas | Haute-Garonne | Mountain |
| Louis-Bernard Guyton de Morveau | Côte-d'Or | Mountain |
| Jean-Baptiste Treilhard | Seine-et-Oise | Plain |

=== 2nd Committee (10 July – 5 September 1793) ===
Party breakdown

- The Mountain (Left)
- The Plain (Centre)
6
3

| Member | Department | Affiliation |
|---|---|---|
| Bertrand Barère | Hautes-Pyrénées | Plain |
| Georges Couthon | Puy-de-Dôme | Mountain |
| Thomas-Augustin de Gasparin | Bouches-du-Rhône | Plain |
| André Jeanbon | Lot | Mountain |
| Robert Lindet | Eure | Plain |
| Pierre Louis Prieur | Marne | Mountain |
| Louis de Saint-Just | Aisne | Mountain |
| Jean Hérault de Séchelles | Seine | Mountain |
| Jacques-Alexis Thuriot | Marne | Mountain |

Changes

- On 30 May or 11 June, Saint-Just, Couthon and Hérault de Séchelles (Mountain) were admitted to the committee.
- On 27 July 1793, Gasparin was substituted by Maximilien Robespierre (Mountain).

=== 3rd Committee (5 September 1793 – 31 July 1794) ===
Party breakdown

- The Mountain (Left)
- The Plain (Centre)
9
3

| Member | Department | Affiliation |
|---|---|---|
| Bertrand Barère | Hautes-Pyrénées | Plain |
| Jacques-Nicolas Billaud-Varenne | Seine | Mountain |
| Lazare Carnot | Pas-de-Calais | Plain |
| Jean-Marie Collot | Seine | Mountain |
| Georges Couthon (Before 27 July 1794) | Puy-de-Dôme | Mountain |
| André Jeanbon | Lot | Mountain |
| Robert Lindet | Eure | Plain |
| Pierre Louis Prieur | Marne | Mountain |
| Claude-Antoine Prieur-Duvernois | Côte-d'Or | Mountain |
| Maximilien Robespierre (Before 27 July 1794) | Seine | Mountain |
| Louis de Saint-Just (Before 27 July 1794) | Aisne | Mountain |
| Jean Hérault de Séchelles (Before 17 March 1794) | Seine | Mountain |

Changes

- On 17 March 1794, Hérault de Séchelles (Mountain) was arrested for treason, leaving his post vacant.
- On 27 July 1794, Robespierre, Saint-Just and Couthon (Mountain) were arrested and executed the following day.
- On 27 July 1794, the three were substituted by Jean-Lambert Tallien (Mountain).

=== 4th–5th Committees (1 September – 7 November 1794) ===
Party breakdown

- Thermidorians (Centre)
- The Mountain (Left)
11
1

| 4th Committee (September–October) | | | 5th Committee (October–November) | | |
| Member | Department | Affiliation | Member | Department | Affiliation |
|---|---|---|---|---|---|
| Jean-Jacques Bréard | Charente-Inférieure | Thermidorian | Renewed | | |
| Lazare Carnot | Pas-de-Calais | Thermidorian | Pierre Louis Prieur | Marne | The Mountain |
| Jean-François-Bertrand Delmas | Haute-Garonne | Thermidorian | Renewed | | |
| Joseph Eschassériaux | Charente-Inférieure | Thermidorian | Renewed | | |
| Antoine François de Fourcroy | Seine | Thermidorian | Renewed | | |
| Pierre-Antoine Laloy | Haute-Marne | Thermidorian | Renewed | | |
| Charles Cochon de Lapparent | Deux-Sèvres | Thermidorian | Renewed | | |
| Jean-Baptiste Matthieu | Oise | Thermidorian | Renewed | | |
| Philippe-Antoine Merlin | Nord | Thermidorian | Renewed | | |
| Claude-Antoine Prieur-Duvernois | Côte-d'Or | Thermidorian | Louis-Bernard Guyton de Morveau | Côte-d'Or | Thermidorian |
| Jean-Baptiste Treilhard | Seine-et-Oise | Thermidorian | Renewed | | |
| Jacques-Alexis Thuriot | Marne | Crest | Renewed | | |

=== 6th–7th Committees (7 November 1794 – 7 January 1795) ===
Party breakdown

- Thermidorians (Centre)
10
- Conservatives (Right)
1
- The Crest (Left)
1

| 6th Committee (November–December) | | | 7th Committee (December–January) | | |
| Member | Department | Affiliation | Member | Department | Affiliation |
|---|---|---|---|---|---|
| Jean-Jacques Bréard | Charente-Inférieure | Thermidorian | Vacant | | |
| Jean-François-Bertrand Delmas | Haute-Garonne | Thermidorian | Renewed | | |
| Jean-Jacques Régis de Cambacérès | Hérault | Thermidorian | Renewed | | |
| Lazare Carnot | Pas-de-Calais | Thermidorian | Renewed | | |
| Antoine François de Fourcroy | Seine | Thermidorian | Renewed | | |
| Charles Cochon de Lapparent | Deux-Sèvres | Thermidorian | Vacant | | |
| Jean-Baptiste Matthieu | Oise | Thermidorian | Renewed | | |
| Philippe-Antoine Merlin | Nord | Thermidorian | Renewed | | |
| Louis-Bernard Guyton de Morveau | Côte-d'Or | Thermidorian | Renewed | | |
| Jean Pelet | Lozère | Conservative | Renewed | | |
| Pierre Louis Prieur | Marne | The Mountain | Renewed | | |
| Jacques-Alexis Thuriot | Marne | Crest | André Dumont | Somme | Thermidorian |

=== 8th–9th Committees (7 January – 5 March 1795) ===
Party breakdown

- Thermidorians (Centre)
- Conservatives (Right)
7
1

| 8th Committee (January–February) | | | 9th Committee (February–March) | | |
| Member | Department | Affiliation | Member | Department | Affiliation |
|---|---|---|---|---|---|
| Jean-Jacques Bréard | Charente-Inférieure | Thermidorian | Renewed | | |
| André Dumont | Somme | Thermidorian | Renewed | | |
| Jean-Jacques Régis de Cambacérès | Hérault | Thermidorian | Renewed | | |
| Lazare Carnot | Pas-de-Calais | Thermidorian | Renewed | | |
| Vacant | | | Antoine François de Fourcroy | Seine | Thermidorian |
| Louis-Bernard Guyton de Morveau | Côte-d'Or | Thermidorian | Jean-Baptiste Matthieu | Oise | Thermidorian |
| Jean Pelet | Lozère | Conservative | Renewed | | |
| Pierre Louis Prieur | Marne | The Mountain | Philippe-Antoine Merlin | Nord | Thermidorian |

=== 10th–11th Committees (5 March – 5 May 1795) ===
Party breakdown

- Thermidorians (Centre)
- Conservatives (Right)
5
1

| 10th Committee (March–April) | | | 11th Committee (April–May) | | |
| Member | Department | Affiliation | Member | Department | Affiliation |
|---|---|---|---|---|---|
| Jean-Jacques Bréard | Charente-Inférieure | Thermidorian | Renewed | | |
| André Dumont | Somme | Thermidorian | Denis Toussaint Lesage | Eure-et-Loir | Thermidorian |
| Jean-Jacques Régis de Cambacérès | Hérault | Thermidorian | Renewed | | |
| Antoine François de Fourcroy | Seine | Thermidorian | Renewed | | |
| Jean-Baptiste Matthieu | Oise | Thermidorian | Renewed | | |
| Philippe-Antoine Merlin | Nord | Thermidorian | Renewed | | |
| Vacant | | | Jacques Antoine Creuzé-Latouche | Vienne | Conservative |

=== 12th Committee (3 June – 25 October 1795) ===
Party breakdown

- Thermidorians (Centre)
- Conservatives (Right)
3
2

| Member | Department | Affiliation |
|---|---|---|
| Jean-Jacques Régis de Cambacérès | Hérault | Thermidorian |
| Pierre Henry-Larivière | Calvados | Conservative |
| Louis-Marie de La Révellière | Maine-et-Loire | Conservative |
| Denis Toussaint Lesage | Eure-et-Loir | Thermidorian |
| Philippe-Antoine Merlin | Nord | Thermidorian |

== Use of the term during the Algerian War ==
During the May 1958 crisis in France, an army junta under General Jacques Massu seized power in Algiers on the night of 13 May 1958 and General Salan assumed leadership of a body calling itself the Committee of Public Safety.

== See also ==
- Commissioners of the Committee of Public Safety
- Committee of General Security
- National Convention
- Historiography of the French Revolution
- Revolutionary Tribunal
- Reflections on the Revolution in France
