= Moyse Bayle =

French revolutionary politician

29th President of the National Convention
- In office 22 October 1793 – 6 November 1793
- Preceded by: Louis-Joseph Charlier
- Succeeded by: Pierre-Antoine Lalloy
- In office 22 October 1793 – 6 November 1793

Personal details
- Born: Moyse Antoine Pierre Jean Bayle; 16 July 1755 Chêne-Bougeries
- Died: Unknown
- Party: The Mountain
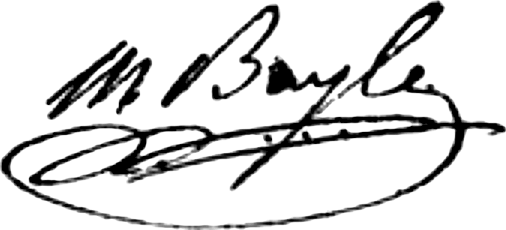
- Signature

Moyse Antoine Pierre Jean Bayle (16 July 1755, in Chêne – between 1812 and 1815) was a French politician of the French Revolution.

== Life ==
=== Before the Convention ===
Bayle was member of Marseille's Jacobins in 1790, he protected Charles-Jean-Marie-Barbaroux which he allowed to take municipal functions.

=== Bayle at the Convention ===
==== Bayle the Montagnard ====
He took part in the National Convention in 1792 for the Bouches-du-Rhône department winning 376 seats out of 725. When he was in Paris, he split from the Barbaroux and joined the Mountain.

==== Mission to Marseille ====
In March 1793, he took part in a mission to the Drôme department in Marseille which was in charge with Joseph Antoine Boisset and added 300,000 men necessary to defend the area.

When he returned to Paris, Bayle was reported by the Committee of Public Safety on 23 May 1793 which denounced Marseille's popular tribunal.

==== On the Committee of Public Safety ====
He was member of the Committee of General Security on 13 August 1793, he was later president of the National Convention on 19 October for two weeks.

==== Thermidorian Reaction ====
He evenly had the strength to defend Barère, Billaud-Varenne, Collot d'Herbois and Vadier about their trails

=== Decline and death ===
His final work was controlling the rights of the Ourthe department.

He disappeared from sources in 1811.

== See also ==
- Politics of France
