= Thermidorians =

Thermidorians Thermidoriens
- Leader: Paul Barras
- Founded: 27 July 1794
- Dissolved: 10 November 1799
- Split from: The Mountain
- Headquarters: Hôtel de Noailles, Paris
- Ideology: Reactionism; Anti-radicalism; Anti-clericalism; Classical liberalism Conservative liberalism Republicanism (factions)
- Political position: Centre

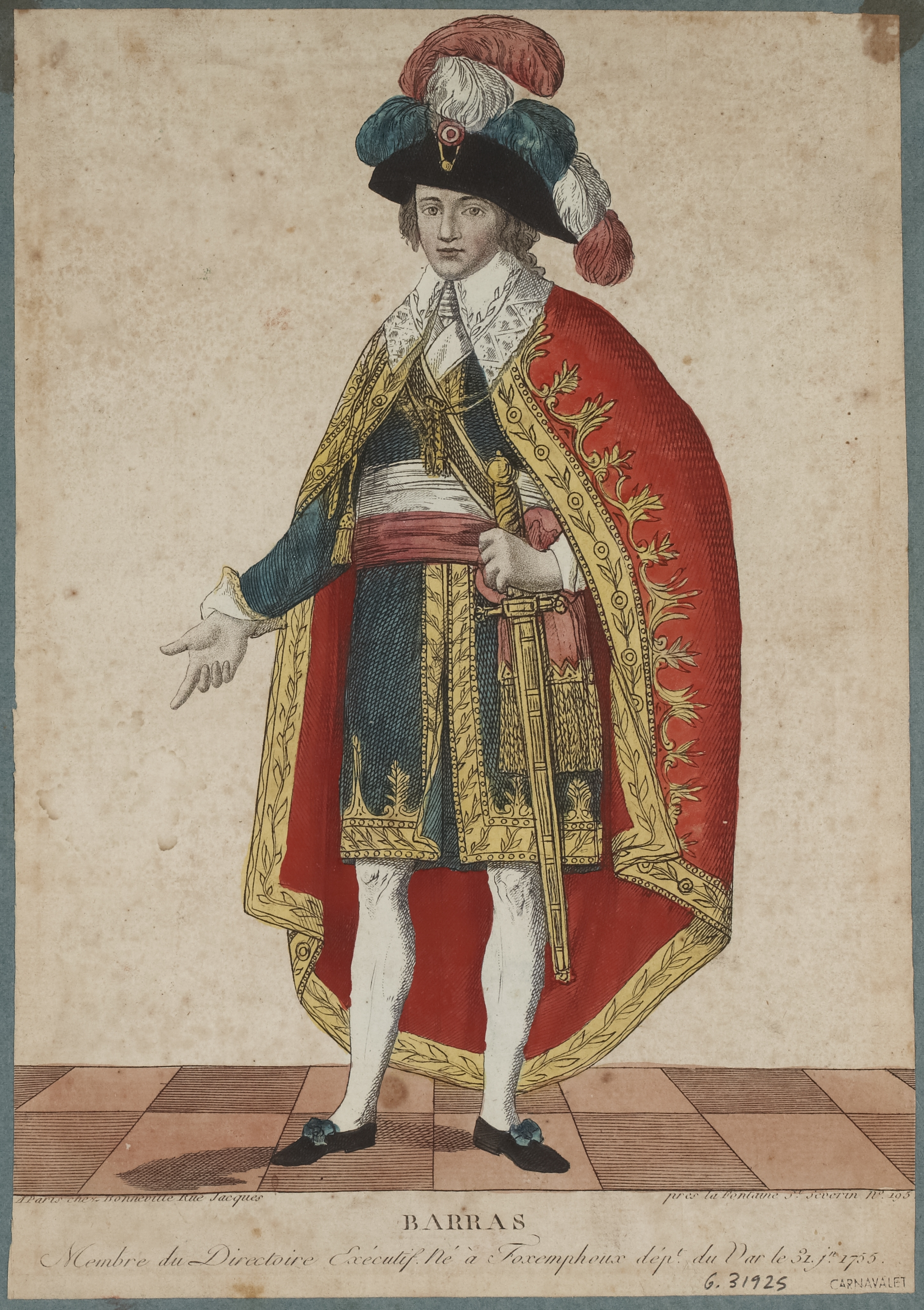
Paul Barras in official costume as a member of the Directory.

The Thermidorians (French: Thermidoriens, named after the month of Thermidor) were a political group during the French First Republic. They formed in 1794 and dominated the last year of the National Convention, which during this phase became known as the Thermidorian Convention (French: Convention thermidorienne), and the Directory government until the rise of Napoleon Bonaparte to power in 1799.

== History ==
The group was named for the Thermidorian Reaction in 1794, when its members—led by Paul Barras, Jean-Lambert Tallien and Joseph Fouché – ousted Maximilien Robespierre and Louis Antoine de Saint-Just, who were executed with their supporters on 27 July 1794. The deputies that supported the Reaction were the following:

- Moderates (members of The Marsh) like Emmanuel Joseph Sieyès, Jean de Cambacérès and Boissy d'Anglas
- Montagnards opposite to Robespierre like Tallien and Jean-Baptiste Carrier
- Members of the Committee of Public Safety like Barras, Bertrand Barère, Lazare Carnot, Marc Vadier, Jean Amar and Collot d'Herbois

Over the following days, the Thermidorians took over the majority in the National Convention. In 1795 a new constitution was introduced, with the National Convention disestablished and the Directory becoming the new government. Like the constitution, the Thermidorians emphasised bourgeois values: conservative on social themes and liberal on economic themes. Besides that they were a split from the Montagnards, ideologically they were closer to the Girondins, Monarchiens, Feuillants Club and the Club de Clichy which embraced, like the Thermidorians, liberal economic themes and Conservatism in social themes.

After the election of 1795, the Thermidorians obtained the majority in the Council of Five Hundred, the new lower house. In Paris, the group created a headquarters in the Hôtel de Noailles and Paul Barras became its leader.

The Directory lasted until 1799, when the coup of 18 Brumaire brought Napoleon Bonaparte to power; the Directory was replaced with a Consulate with Bonaparte as First Consul. After the coup, the various parliamentary forces including the Thermidorians were disestablished.

== Notable members ==
- Paul Barras
- Joseph Fouché
- Jean-Jacques-Régis de Cambacérès
- Jean-Lambert Tallien
- Pierre-Louis Bentabole
- Emmanuel Joseph Sieyès
- Louis-Marie Stanislas Fréron
- Thérésa Tallien
- Pierre Claude François Daunou
- Louis Marie de La Révellière-Lépeaux
- Philippe-Antoine Merlin de Douai
- Roger Ducos
- Jean-François Rewbell
- Jean-Marie Collot d'Herbois
- Jacques-Nicolas Billaud-Varenne
- Marc-Guillaume Alexis Vadier

== Electoral results ==
Council of Five Hundred
Election year	No. of overall votes	% of overall vote	No. of overall seats won	+/–	Leader
1795	12,600 (1st)	42.0	242 / 750	–	Paul Barras
1797	Unknown (3rd)	Unknown	91 / 657	▼151	
1798	Unknown (2nd)	29.3	387 / 807	▲296	Paul Barras
