= Louis-Joseph Charlier =

French politician

28th President of the National Convention
- In office 3 October 1793 – 22 October 1793
- Preceded by: Pierre-Joseph Cambon
- Succeeded by: Moyse Bayle

Personal details
- Born: 24 September 1754 Châlons-sur-Marne, France
- Died: 23 February 1797 (aged 42) Paris, France
- Cause of death: Suicide by firearm
- Citizenship: French
- Party: The Mountain
- Occupation: Lawyer
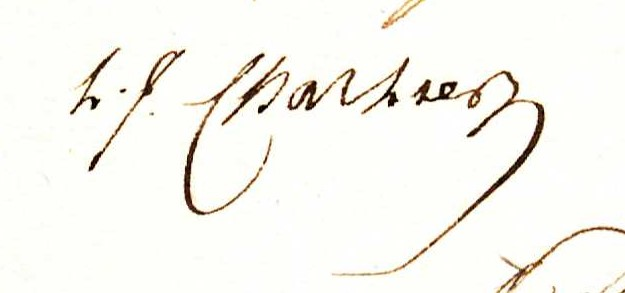
- Signature

Louis-Joseph Charlier (24 September 1754 – 23 February 1797) was a French statesman during the French Revolution, an early supporter of the Montagnard faction of the National Convention, but ultimately one of many turncoats to betray the régime of the French Terror. He served as president of the National Convention for one two-week term in October 1793.

In 1793, Charlier introduced the first law making primary education obligatory in France. A defender of women's rights, he opposed the ban on women's societies imposed in the same year during the Terror.

== Biography ==
Charlier was born in Châlons-sur-Marne, Marne, the son of a surgeon. He practised law in his hometown before getting an appointment as administrator of the district of Châlons-sur-Marne in the early years of the French Revolution.

Elected (4 September 1791) as a representative of Marne to the Legislative Assembly, he sat with the extreme left, and was named deputy member of the Extraordinary Commission of Twelve.

He was elected to the National Convention (1792–1795), once again as a deputy for Marne. He was an ardent supporter of the Montagnard faction, voting along with them for the death sentence in the trial of Louis XVI (executed 21 January 1793), and he demanded harsh measures against the ascendent rival Girondist faction, which fell from power 31 May 1793.

He supported a wide variety of causes while a deputy to the Convention, such as when he argued against military recruitment, preferring a levée en masse if needed, and when he strongly supported making public education mandatory.

Charlier served as a term President of the National Convention (3 October 1793 – 22 October 1793) during the French Terror, but as time went by he betrayed the cause and participated in verbal attacks on terrorist leader Maximilien Robespierre during the Thermidorian coup (27 July 1794). He was sent on a mission to Lyon (known then briefly as Commune-Affranchie) as a representative of the Convention (21 August 1794 – 1 December 1794), where he behaved with notable moderation, as was fitting in the conservative atmosphere of the times. Nevertheless, a motion for his arrest was considered by the Convention (20 May 1795), though, it was rejected.

As a former deputy of the Convention, entered the Council of Ancients (1795–1797), part of the successor legislative body to the Convention. He showed signs of mental illness, however, and committed suicide by gunshot in 1797.
