= Anglès =

Anglès may refer to:

- Anglès, Tarn, France
- Anglès, Girona, Spain
