= Jean Debry =

French politician

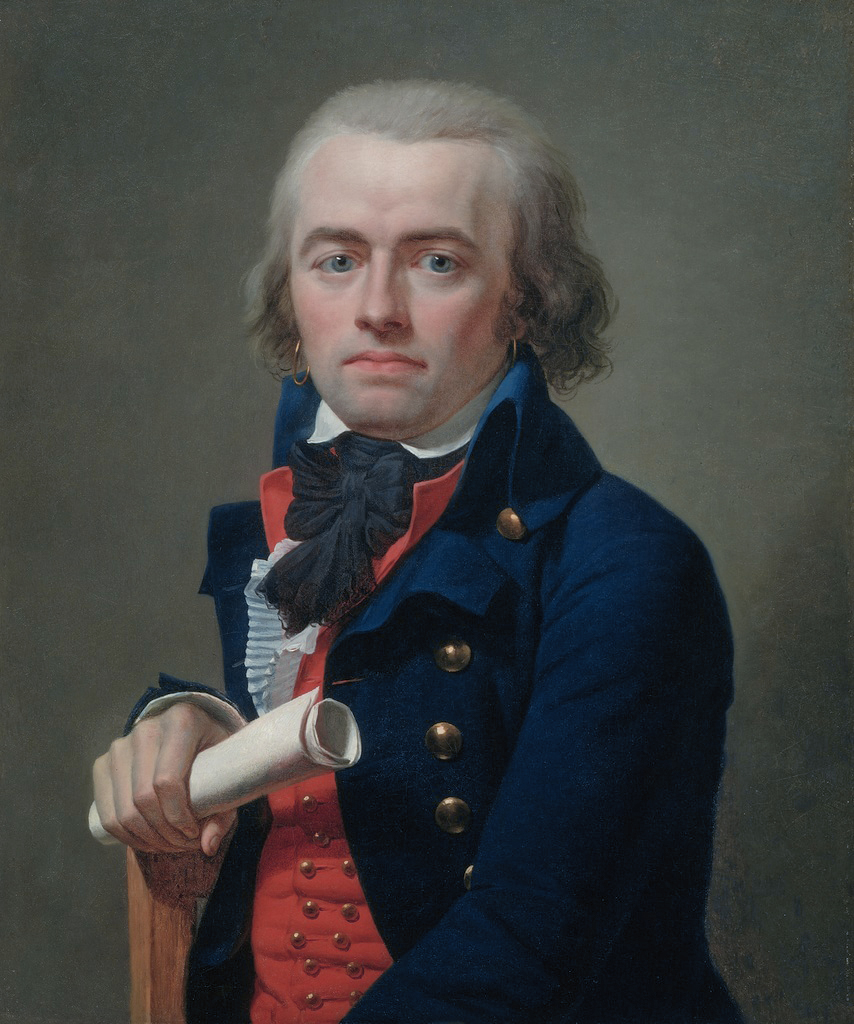
- Debry by Jean-Louis Laneuville c. 1793

14th President of the National Convention
- In office 21 March – 4 April 1793
- Preceded by: Armand Gensonné
- Succeeded by: Jean-François-Bertrand Delmas

President of the Council of Five Hundred
- In office 21 December 1796 – 19 January 1797
- In office 20 May – 18 June 1799

Deputy in the National Legislative Assembly
- In office 8 September 1791 – 20 September 1792
- Constituency: Aisne

Deputy in the National Convention
- In office 4 September 1792 – 26 October 1795
- Constituency: Aisne

Deputy in the Council of Five Hundred
- In office 15 October 1795 – 26 December 1799
- Constituency: Aisne

Personal details
- Born: 25 November 1760 Vervins, Kingdom of France
- Died: 6 January 1834 (aged 73) Paris, Kingdom of France
- Resting place: Père Lachaise Cemetery
- Party: The Plain
- Awards: Commander of the Legion of Honour; Baron of the Empire

Jean-Antoine-Joseph de Bry, also spelled Debry (French pronunciation: [ʒɑ̃n‿ɑ̃twan ʒozɛf dəbʁi]; ( 25 November 1760 – 6 January 1834), was a French politician of the French Revolution. He served as President of the National Convention (21 March 1793 – 4 April 1793), and is famous for the slogan La patrie est en danger (The Fatherland is in danger) he proposed.

== Early life ==
Debry was born on 25 November 1760 in Vervins, in the province of Picardy. He became a lawyer at the Parlement of Paris in January 1784, and was appointed administrator of the royal jurisdictions in Vervins in March 1786. In the following years, Debry published multiple writings supporting the ideas of the Enlightenment.

== Revolution ==
With the Revolution he was appointed administrator of the department of Aisne in June 1790. He was elected in September 1791 as deputy of the Legislative Assembly for Aisne. Debry was known as an ardent revolutionary, and in January 1792 successfully proposed a decree that altered the line of succession of the then constitutional French monarchy, by making Louis Stanislas (who eventually reigned as Louis XVIII on the Restoration) ineligible to the French throne due to his emigration from France.

Debry was again elected in September 1792, as a representative of Aisne in the new National Convention. In the following year he voted for the death sentence of King Louis XVI, defended more severe punishments against emigrés, and proposed the transport of Rousseau's remains to the Panthéon in Paris, which was achieved in October 1794. Debry protested against the arrest of the Girondins following the 31 May insurrection, but then kept a low profile until the fall of Robespierre and the end of the Reign of Terror.

He served in the Council of Five Hundred for the entire duration of the Directory regime and as its president between December 1796 and January 1797, seating with the Thermidorians as a dedicated supporter of the Republic.

=== Diplomatic mission and assassination attempt ===
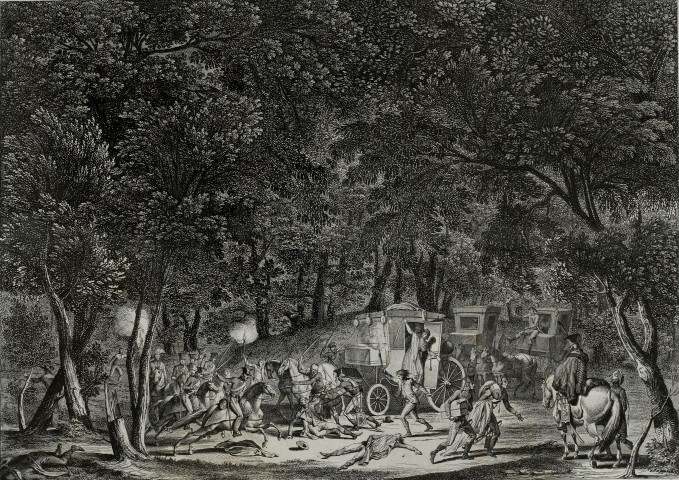
Attack on the French plenipotentiaries near Rastatt, of which Debry was the sole survivor. Print by Jean Duplessis-Bertaux (Musée de la Révolution française)

In 1798, Debry was chosen as one of the three delegates of the French Republic sent to the Congress of Rastatt, with the intention of negotiating a peace treaty with the Holy Roman Empire. When leaving Rastatt on 28 April 1799, the three were assaulted by a group of hussars. The other French envoys, Roberjot and Bonnier, were killed on the spot, while Debry received thirteen sabre wounds but survived, having managed to escape and hurriedly seek asylum with a Prussian government official.

Using an arm sling, Debry was acclaimed on his return to the Council of Five Hundred on 20 May 1799, and on the same day was elected for another term as its president.

== Consulat, Empire and later life ==
A supporter of Napoleon Bonaparte in his coup of 18 Brumaire, Debry became a member of the Tribunat in December 1799 following its creation by the Constitution of the Year VIII. From then on he held local administration offices, being appointed in April 1801 préfet of the department of Doubs, remaining in office until the First Bourbon Restoration in 1814. He was awarded the Legion of Honour in 1803, and was made Knight (1808) and later Baron of the Empire (1809).

Despite a friendly approach towards the restored Bourbons, Debry accepted Napoleon's appointment to the prefecture of Bas-Rhin during the Hundred Days, on 22 March 1815. Following the emperor's second abdication he was dismissed from office, and in January 1816 forced to leave the country by a law that exiled the regicides of Louis XVI. He retired to Mons, in the United Kingdom of the Netherlands. Debry was only allowed to return with the definitive fall of the Bourbons in 1830, and as a former prefect was granted a pension by the new government of Louis Philippe of France. He died in Paris on 6 January 1834.

== Works ==
- Essai sur l'éducation nationale (1790)
- Eloge de Mirabeau (1790)
- Opinion sur la Constitution de 1793
- Catéchisme des élections (1797)
