= Jacques-Alexis Thuriot de la Rosière =

French noble (1753–1829)

Jacques-Alexis Thuriot
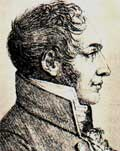

21st President of the National Convention
- In office 27 June 1793 – 11 July 1793
- Preceded by: Jean-Marie Collot d'Herbois
- Succeeded by: Jeanbon Saint-André

Personal details
- Born: 1 May 1753 Sézanne, Champagne, Kingdom of France
- Died: 20 June 1829 (aged 76) Liège, Kingdom of the Netherlands
- Party: The Mountain

Jacques-Alexis Thuriot (French pronunciation: [ʒak alɛksi tyʁjo]), known as Thuriot de la Rosière, and later as chevalier Thuriot de la Rosière, chevalier de l'Empire (1 May 1753 - 20 June 1829) was an important French statesman of the French Revolution, and a minor figure under the French Empire of Napoleon Bonaparte.

== Early life and the French Revolution ==
Thuriot was born in Sézanne, Marne, France in 1753. Admitted to the bar in Paris in 1778, he practiced law at Reims before the outbreak of the Revolution in 1789. He took part in the events of 14 July 1789, acting as a negotiator on behalf of the revolutionaries, meeting with the governor of the Bastille just before the royal fortress was stormed. In 1790 during the term of the National Assembly, he was named a tribunal judge for the district of Sézanne, and he joined the Jacobin Club.

He was elected to the Legislative Assembly (1791–1792) as a representative of the département of Marne. As the French monarchy tottered during 1792, he was named deputy member of the Extraordinary Commission of Twelve (18 June 1792 - 21 September 1792).

Soon after Louis XVI was deposed, Thuriot was elected (3 September 1792) to the new National Convention (1792–1795) as deputy for Marne. He voted for the death sentence in the trial of Louis XVI. He was one of the more radical members, often speaking against the Girondist faction, and even calling Maximilien Robespierre "moderate". He served as Vice-President (9–18 April 1793) and President (27 June - 11 July 1793), and was elected to the increasingly powerful Committee of Public Safety (10 July - 20 September 1793). He resigned from the committee as the Reign of Terror began.

== Thermidorean reaction ==
Thuriot was one of the bolder opponents of Maximilien Robespierre. The scholar Georges Lefebvre counts him as a key ally of Danton, who was executed by the machinations of Robespierre on 5 April 1794. During the Festival of the Supreme Being (8 June 1794), Thuriot said of Robespierre presiding: “Look at the bugger; it’s not enough for him to be master, he has to be God.” During the fateful session of the Convention on 9 Thermidor, Year II (27 July 1794), Thuriot presided in the absence of then-president Jean-Marie Collot d'Herbois, and by refusing to allow Robespierre to make a speech, he sealed the fate of the Robespierrist faction.

In the days immediately following Thermidor he was elected president of the Jacobin Club (5–24 August 1794) and exercised an important restraining influence on one of France's most radical bodies. He was among those who replaced the purged members of the Committee of Public Safety during his second term (31 July - 5 December 1794).

In 1795, he soon turned against the new political order, disgruntled by the abandonment of the Constitution of 1793 and the rehabilitation of the Girondists. On 5 April 1795, in the wake of the Jacobin-led Germinal Insurrection which he was accused of preparing, Thuriot's name was included among the many arrests ordered, but he eluded capture. A second order of arrest was issued on 21 May after the even more violent Prairial Insurrection, and this time a large force was dispatched into the faubourgs to find where Thuriot was in hiding with Pierre-Joseph Cambon. Once again he escaped and went into hiding until the amnesty of 26 October, which signalled the end of the National Convention and the Thermidorian Reaction and the beginning of the Directory.

== Later career ==
Thuriot was appointed (14 November 1796) as a commissioner to the civil and criminal tribunals of Marne, and he later served as deputy judge and judge in the criminal tribunal of Seine. During the French Empire he held positions in the imperial court of appeals, and Bonaparte named him Thuriot de la Rosière, chevalier de l'Empire on 16 May 1813. Under the Bourbon Restoration, he was banished in 1816 as a regicide and died in exile in Liège, Netherlands (now in Belgium).
