= Jean-Baptiste Charles Matthieu =

French politician

67th President of the National Convention
- In office 26 May – 4 June 1795
- Preceded by: Théodore Vernier
- Succeeded by: Jean-Denis Lanjuinais

Personal details
- Born: 3 October 1763 Compiègne, Oise, Kingdom of France
- Died: 31 October 1833 (aged 70) Libourne, Gironde, Kingdom of France
- Party: The Plain

Jean-Baptiste-Charles-Mirampal Matthieu (3 October 1763, Compiègne – 31 October 1833, Condat, Gironde) was a French politician and Deputy to the National Convention.

He voted for the execution of Louis XVI. On 4 September 1792, he was elected member of the convention by the department of Oise. Initially he was a moderate, despising the excesses of the Jacobins and directing his hostility toward Robespierre. On 26 May 1795, he was elected president of the Convention in a difficult position, just after the Uprising of 1 Prairial.

== Bibliography ==
- Gainot, Bernard (1990). Dictionnaire des membres du comité de Salut Public (in French). Paris: Tallandier.
- "Jean-Baptiste, Charles Mathieu-Mirampal". National Assembly (in French).
