= Edmond Louis Alexis Dubois-Crancé =

French musketeer, general and revolutionary politician

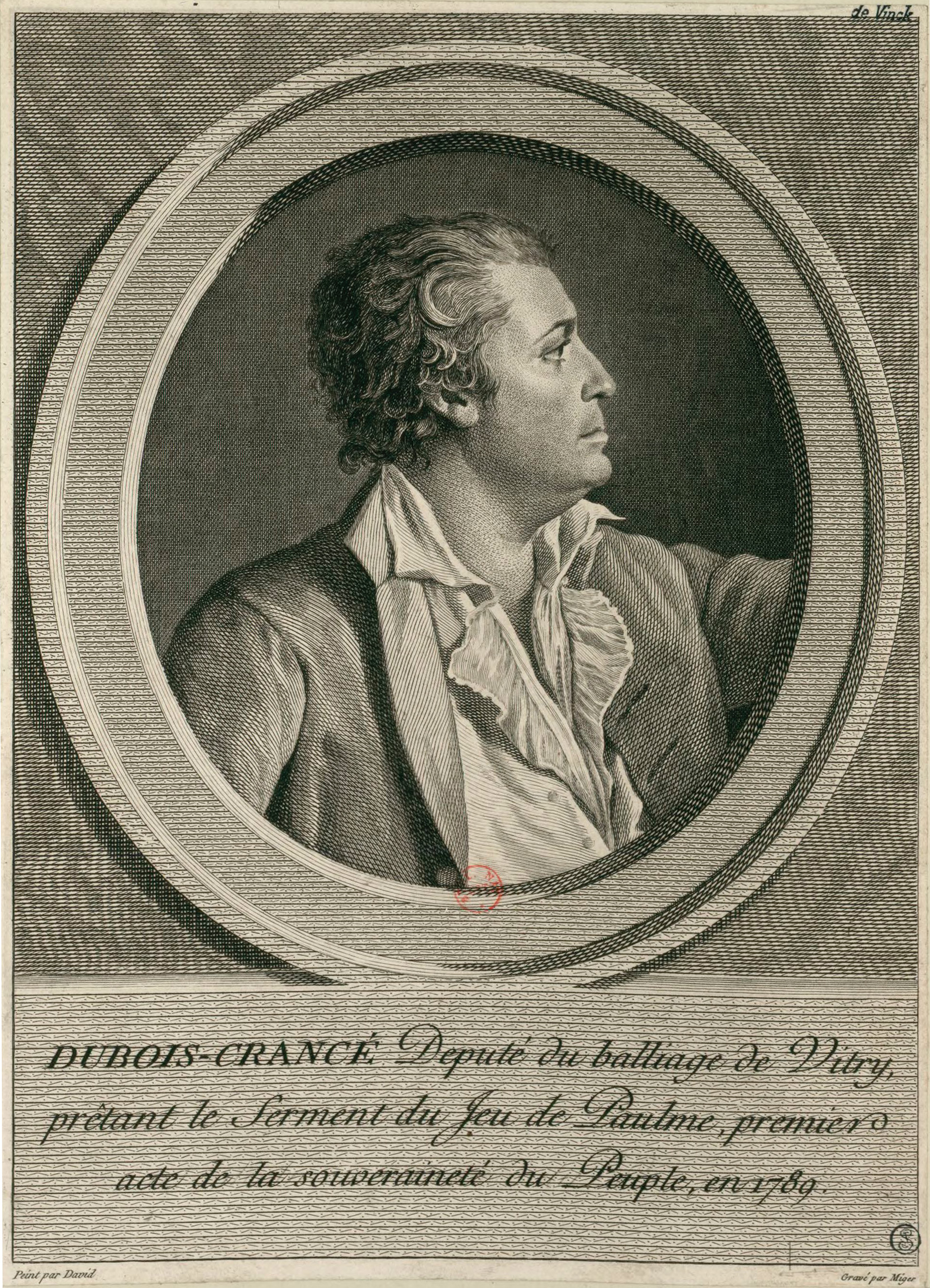

12th President of the National Convention
- In office 21 February – 7 March 1793
- Preceded by: Jean-Jacques Bréard
- Succeeded by: Armand Gensonné

Personal details
- Born: 14 October 1747; Charleville, Ardennes, Kingdom of France
- Died: 28 June 1814 (aged 66); Rethel, Ardennes, France
- Political party: The Mountain

Edmond-Louis-Alexis Dubois de Crancé, dit Dubois-Crancé (French: [ɛdmɔ̃ lwi alɛksi dybwakʁɑ̃se]; 14 October 1747 – 28 June 1814), was a French musketeer, general, and revolutionary politician who served for a few months as minister of war.

== Family life ==
Born in Charleville, Ardennes, he was at first a musketeer, then a lieutenant of the Marchaux (guardsmen of the Ancien Régime), and embraced Liberalism.

== National and Constituent Assemblies ==
At the start of the French Revolution in 1789, he was elected deputy to the States-General by the Third Estate of Vitry-le-François, and joined the National Assembly. (His portrait stands in the foreground in Jacques-Louis David's celebrated sketch of the Oath of the Tennis Court.)

In the Constituent Assembly, of which he was named secretary in November, Dubois-Crancé carried out activities in support of military reforms. He aimed for the replacement of the old military system, one of promotions on the basis of aristocratic origin and reliance on mercenaries, replaced by an organization of National Guards in which all citizens should be admitted. In his report, submitted on 12 December 1789, he plumped for a true national army in a speech that called for every citizen to be a soldier and every soldier a citizen. He was the first to promote the idea of conscription, which he opposed to the recruiting system practiced; however, the document was not adopted. He succeeded in securing the Assembly's vote that any African slave who touched French soil should become free.

== National Convention ==
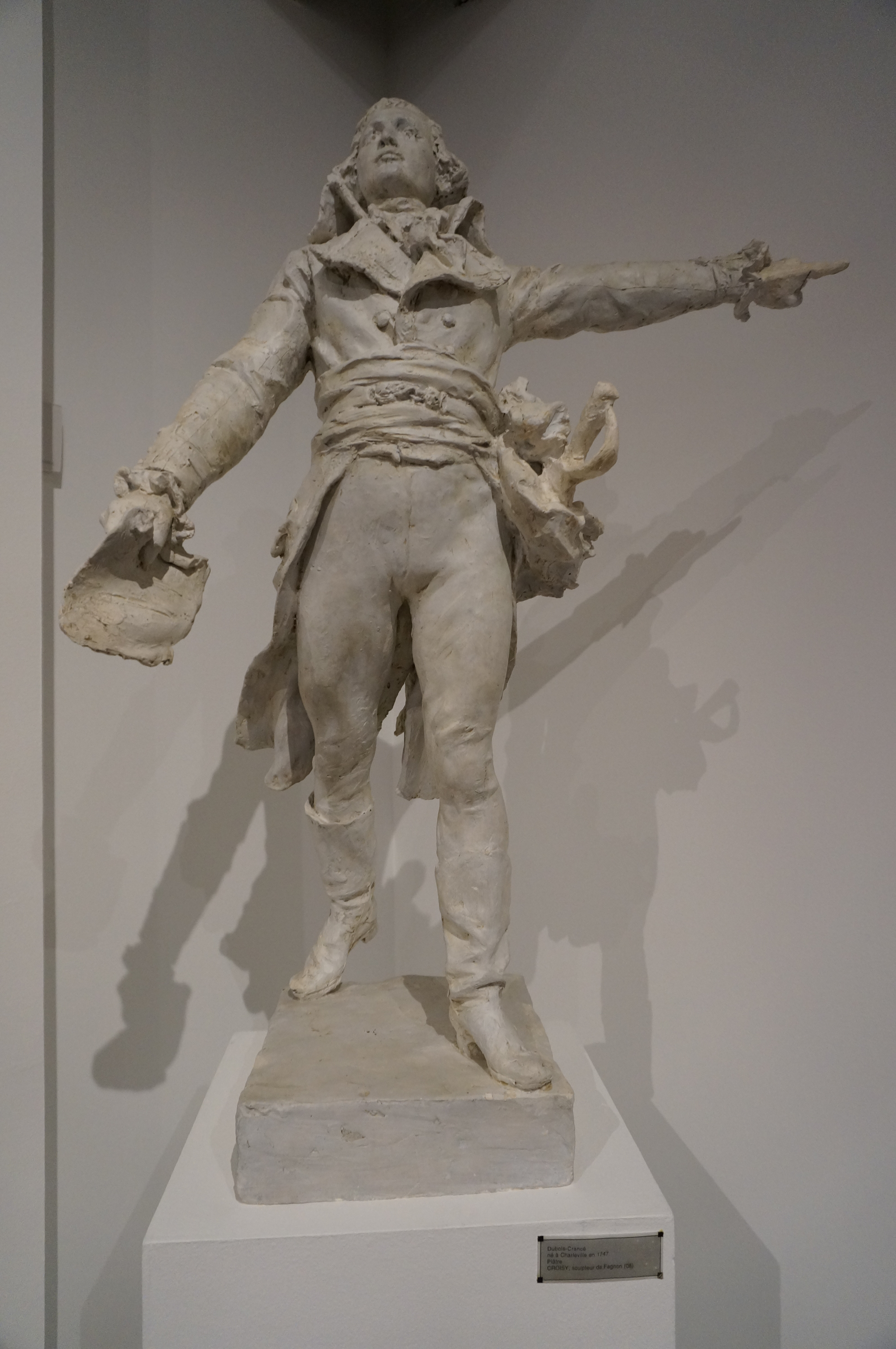
Dubois Crancé by Aristide Croisy

After the Constituent, Dubois-Crancé was named maréchal-de-camp, but he refused to be placed under the orders of the Marquis de La Fayette and preferred to serve as a simple grenadier.

Elected to the French Republic's National Convention by the Ardennes département, he sided with The Mountain, but without following any one leader - either George Danton or Maximilien Robespierre. During the trial of King Louis XVI, Dubois-Crancé voted for the death penalty without delay or appeal. On the 21 February 1793, he was named president of the Convention.

On May 29, 1793, fighting broke at in Lyon as royalists attempted to overthrow the National Convention. Dubois-Crancé, being a member of the convention, took to the task of trying to resolve the dispute diplomatically with the royalists, but the royalists refused his entreaties and the revolt was brutally crushed.

Although he was a member of the two committees of general defence which preceded the Reign of Terror's Committee of Public Safety, he did not belong to the latter at its creation. Instead, he composed an important report on the state of the French Revolutionary Army, recommending two measures which contributed largely to its success - the rapid advancement of the lower officers, which opened the way for the most successful generals of the Revolution, and the fusion of the volunteers with the veteran troops.

== Clash with Robespierre, the Directory, and 18 Brumaire ==
In August 1793, Dubois-Crancé was designated representative on mission to the army of the Alps, to direct the siege of Lyon, which had revolted against France's government. Accused of "lack of zeal", he was replaced by Georges Couthon. On his return he defended himself, but was excluded from the Jacobin Club at the instance of his rival Robespierre on 11 July 1794. Consequently, he was approached to take part in the Thermidor Coup that toppled Robespierre at the end of the month. However, he would not join the Royalist reaction which followed, and was one of the Committee of Five which had to oppose the Royalist insurrection known as 13 Vendémiaire (in October 1795).

It was also during this period that Dubois-Crancé was named a member of the Committee of Public Safety, already much reduced in importance. After the Convention, under the Directory, Dubois-Crancé was a member of the Council of Five Hundred, and was appointed Inspector General of infantry, then, in 1799, minister of war. In November, he also opposed Napoleon Bonaparte's coup d'état (the 18 Brumaire), and lived in retirement during Consulate and the Empire, dying in Rethel.

== Sources ==
- It cites as a reference:
- Thomas Jung, Dubois de Crancé. L'armée et la Revolution, 1789-1794 (2 vols., Paris, 1884).

Political offices
Preceded by Jean-Baptiste Bernadotte	Minister of War; 14 September 1799 - 10 November 1799	Succeeded by Louis Alexandre Berthier
