= Commission of Twelve =

During the French Revolution, the Extraordinary Commission of Twelve (Commission extraordinaire des Douze) was a commission of the French National Convention charged with finding and trying conspirators. It was known for short as the Commission of Twelve and its formation led to the revolt of 2 June 1793, the fall of the Girondins and the start of the Reign of Terror.

== History ==
=== Formation ===
Since the convention's formation, the Girondists and Montagnards had competed to dominate it. The Montagnards had been able to set up the Extraordinary criminal tribunal on 10 March 1793 and the Committee of Public Safety on 6 April the same year. Attacked on all sides by a majority of the 48 revolutionary sections of Paris, by the Paris Commune and by the Club des Jacobins, the Girondist assembly feared for its safety and on 18 May decreed the creation of an extraordinary committee of twelve men known as the Commission of Twelve to contain the attacks.

This new commission had been requested by Barère and was put in charge of looking into all decisions taken over the past month by the conseil général of the Commune and sections of Paris and unmasking all plots against liberty within the Republic. The minister of the interior, the minister of foreign affairs, the Committee of Public Safety and the Committee of General Security were all to pass on information about plots menacing the national assembly to the Commission of Twelve and the commission was to take all necessary measures to find proof of these conspiracies and to arrest the conspirators.

=== Course ===
On 21 May the commission was elected, with a very strong Girondin majority: Jean-Baptiste Boyer-Fonfrède, Jean-Paul Rabaut Saint-Étienne, Kervélégan, Charles Saint-Martin-Valogne, Louis-François-Sébastien Viger, Jean-René Gomaire, Bertrand de la Hosdinière, Jacques Boilleau, Étienne Mollevaut, Henry-Larivière, François Bergoeing and Jean-François Martin Gardien. On 23 May it announced it had begun work and the following day Viger reported to the National Convention on the commission's means of guaranteeing the convention's safety by foiling the plots which threatened it. It presented a draft decree which was adopted after a very long discussion between the Montagnards and Girondins.

The sections of Paris were already complaining about the behaviour of the commission's members, however. First on 24 May the section du Contrat-Social rose up against the submission of its minutes, then on 25 May the commune denounced the arbitrary arrest and imprisonment in the Abbaye of Hébert, proxy for the procureur of the commune. On 27 May, after more arrests, Marat then Thuriot demanded that the Commission of Twelve be suppressed and Henry Larivière resigned. 16 sections of Paris then came to the convention with petitions against the commission. Taking advantage of the late time of day and the absence of several members, the Convention accepted the proposal of Delacroix and decreed that those arrested by the Commission be released, that the Commission be dissolved and that its members' conduct be examined by the Committee of General Security.

On 28 May Osselin read out the Assembly's decree, decided at night. Violent protests arose against the decree, arguing it had not been properly decided upon, badly edited or passed under duress. Lanjuinais demanded he be asked. After several interventions the Convention decided that there would be a vote to determine if the decree should be passed or not.

There were 517 votes cast, with 279 in favour and 238 against. As a result, despite the Girondins' protests, the Convention confirmed the decree breaking up the Commission of Twelve. It also passed a second decree freeing the citizens imprisoned by the commission. Rabaut-Saint-Étienne donna resigned from the commission.

On 30 May, Bourdon de l'Oise denounced the commission for having requisitioned an armed force to guard the hôtel de Breteuil, where it was sitting. Then a deputation from the 22 sections of Paris came to demand that the Convention end the commission and put its members on trial before the revolutionary tribunal.

=== End ===
On 31 May saw the start of a revolt in Paris, the Days of 31 May and 2 June 1793. Thuriot demanded that the Commission be annihilated and the day also saw the last clash of arms between the Girondins and Montagnards at the convention. On 1 June a petition from the 48 sections of Paris demanded a decree to arrest and try 22 members of the convention. The Committee of Public Safety was given the task of making a reply.

On 2 June the members of the sections, under the orders of Hanriot, provisional commander of the National Guard, gathered and marched on the convention. They were armed with pikes and pulled cannons in their wake. Two cannons were pointed at the Tuileries. The Convention descended into the courtyard and its president Hérault de Séchelles proclaimed the representatives' order enjoining the armed force to retire. Going back into the building, the deputies moved a decree to arrest the denounced Girondins – the Montagnards had triumphed.
