= Jean-François-Bertrand Delmas =

French Revolutionary politician

15th President of the National Convention
- In office 4–18 April 1793
- Preceded by: Jean Debry
- Succeeded by: Marc David Alba Lasource

Personal details
- Born: 3 January 1751 Toulouse, Kingdom of France
- Died: 1 July 1798 (aged 47) Paris, France
- Party: The Mountain

Jean-François-Bertrand Delmas (French pronunciation: [ʒɑ̃ fʁɑ̃swa bɛʁtʁɑ̃ dɛlmas], 3 January 1751 – 1 July 1798) was a French Revolutionary politician. He was député for Haute-Garonne in the Legislative Assembly of 1791–1792, then a member of the French National Convention, the Committee of Public Safety and the Council of Ancients, briefly presiding the Council of Ancients in 1797. Le Moniteur Universel of Fructidor VI (19 August 1798) reported that he had gone mad, and it is considered unlikely that he survived beyond the end of 1798.
