= Jean-Denis Lanjuinais =

French politician, lawyer, jurist, journalist and historian

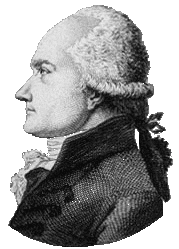
- Lanjuinais in 1790

68th President of the National Convention
- In office 4–19 June 1795
- Preceded by: Jean-Baptiste Charles Matthieu
- Succeeded by: Jean-Baptiste Louvet de Couvray

Personal details
- Born: 12 March 1753 Rennes, Brittany, Kingdom of France
- Died: 13 January 1827 (aged 73) Paris, Kingdom of France
- Party: Jacobins
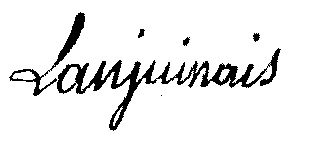
- Signature

Jean Denis, comte Lanjuinais (12 March 1753 – 13 January 1827), was a French politician, lawyer, jurist, journalist, and historian.

== Biography ==
=== Early career ===
Born in Rennes (Ille-et-Vilaine), Lanjuinais, after a brilliant college career, which made him doctor of laws and a qualified barrister at nineteen, was appointed counsel to the Breton Estates and, in 1775, professor of ecclesiastical law in Rennes. At this period he wrote two important works which, owing to the distracted state of public affairs, remained unpublished, Institutiones juris ecciesiastici and Praelectiones juris ecclesiastici.

He had begun his career at the bar by pleading against the droit du colombier (feudal monopoly on dovecotes), and when he was sent by his fellow-citizens to the Estates-General of 1789 he demanded the abolition of nobility and the substitution of the Royal title king of the French and the Navarrese for king of France and Navarre, and helped to establish the Civil Constitution of the Clergy.

On 7 November 1789, he requested that the ministers not be members of Parliament at the same time. Since the regulation found a majority, he was able to prevent an increase in Mirabeau's power that sought to take over a ministerial post.

=== Convention and clandestinity ===
Elected to the National Convention in September 1792, he developed moderate, even reactionary views, becoming one of the fiercest opponents of Montagnards - although he never wavered in his support for the French Republic. He refused to vote for the death of Louis XVI, alleging that the nation had no right to despatch a vanquished prisoner.

His daily attacks on The Mountain resulted, on 15 April 1793, in a demand by the Paris Commune for his exclusion from the assembly, but Lanjuinais remained implacable - when the Parisian populace under François Hanriot invaded the convention on 2 June, he renewed his defiance of the victorious party. Placed under arrest with the Girondists, he escaped to Rennes where he drew up a pamphlet denouncing the Montagnard Constitution under the curious title Le Dernier Crime de Lanjuinais ("The Latest Crime of Lanjuinais", Rennes, 1793). Pursued by Jean-Baptiste Carrier, who was sent to stamp out resistance in the west, he lay hidden until some time after the outbreak of the Thermidorian Reaction (July 1794), but he was readmitted to the convention on 8 March 1795.

=== Later career ===
He maintained his liberal and independent attitude in the Council of Ancients of the French Directory, the Senate of the Consulate and First Empire, and the Chamber of Peers, being president of the upper house during the Hundred Days. Together with Gui-Jean-Baptiste Target, Joseph-Marie Portalis and others he founded under the Empire an academy of legislation in Paris, and lectured on Roman law.

Closely associated with oriental scholars, and a keen student of oriental religions, he entered the Académie des Inscriptions in 1808. After the Bourbon Restoration, Lanjuinais consistently defended the principles of constitutional monarchy, but most of his time was given to religious and political subjects. He was President of the Chamber of Representatives from 4 June to 13 July 1815. Comte Lanjuinais died in Paris.

== Works ==
Besides many contributions to periodical literature he wrote, among other works:

- Réflexions patriotiques, sur l'arrêté de quelques nobles de Bretagne, du 25 octobre 1788 (1788)
- Le préservatif contre l'Avis a mes compatriotes. Avec des observations sur l'affaire présente (1788)
- Rapport sur la nécessité de supprimer les dispenses de mariage, de supprimer ou de modifier les obstacles qui le retardent ou l'annullent, enfin d'établir une forme purement civile pour constater l'état des personnes (1791)
- Opinion de Lanjuinais, député d'Ille et Vilaine, sur Louis le dernier (1792)
- Réflexions dogmatiques et morales : sur le catéchisme rédigé par MM. Maingui et Lanjuinais. Avec un exposé sommaire des principales verités de la foi catholique, apostolique et romaine (1792)
- Discours de J.D. Lanjuinais, sur la question de savior s'il convient de fixer un maximum de population pour les communes de la République (1793)
- Second discours de Lanjuinais, député par le département de l'Isle & Vilaine à la Convention nationale, prononcé le dimanche deux de juin 1793, & détails très-circonstanciés des faits les plus mémorables de cette journée (1793)
- Lettre de Lanjuinais a la Convention nationale (1794)
- Rapport et projet de décret présentés au nom de la Commission des onze, par Lanjuinais, le 7 fructidor, an 3, sur l'envoi et la publication des lois (1795)
- Rapport fait par J.D. Lanjuinais, sur la résolution du 17 brumaire an 5, relative aux déclarations opposées de plusieurs jurys sur le même fait. Séance du 11 nivôse an V (1797)
- Appréciation du projet de loi relatif aux trois concordats (1806, 6th ed. 1827) - a defence of Gallicanism
- Notice de l'ouvrage de m. l'éveque et senateur Grégoire, intitulé De la littérature des nègres (1808)
- Christophe Colomb,, ou Notice d'un livre italien concernant cet illustre navigateur (1809)
- Opinions des messieurs les comtes Boissy-d'Anglas, Lanjuinais, et le duc de Broglie; relatives au projet de loi sur la liberté individuelle (1817)
- Constitutions de la Nation française. avec un essai de traité historique et politique sur la charte, et un recueil de pièces corrélatives. (Tome premier); Tome second (1819)
- Vues politiques sur les changemens a faire a la constitution de l'Espagne, afin de la consolider spécialement dans le royaume des Deux-Siciles (1820)
- Études biographiques et littéraires sur Antoine Arnauld, P. Nicole et Jacques Necker, avec une notice sur Christophe Colomb (1823)

== Family ==
His son, Victor Ambroise, vicomte de Lanjuinais (1802–1869), was also a politician, becoming a deputy in 1838. His interests lay chiefly in financial questions and in 1849 he became minister of commerce and agriculture in the cabinet of Odilon Barrot. He wrote a Notice historique sur la vie et les ouvrages du comte de Lanjuinais, which was prefixed to an edition of his fathers Œuvres (4 vols., 1832).
