= Jean-Jacques Bréard =

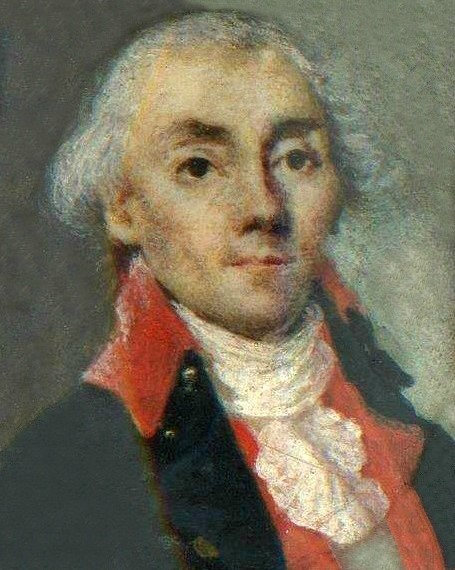

11th President of the National Convention
- In office 7–21 February 1793
- Preceded by: Jean-Paul Rabaut Saint-Étienne
- Succeeded by: Edmond Louis Alexis Dubois-Crancé

Personal details
- Born: 11 October 1751 Quebec, New France
- Died: 2 January 1840 (aged 88) Paris, Kingdom of France
- Party: The Mountain

Jean-Jacques Bréard (French pronunciation: [ʒɑ̃ ʒak bʁeaʁ]; October 1751 - 2 January 1840) was born into a family of a navy inspectors. He moved to France as a young boy in 1758. His first involvement in politics included organizing elections to the Estates General in Marennes and a short stint as mayor of Marennes from January 1790 through July 1790. He also served as administrator of the département of Charente-Inférieure for the district of Marennes, beginning in June 1790. In November 1790, he was elected vice president of the administration. Bréard served on the National Assembly as a representative of Charente- Inférieure and was elected as a deputy to the National Convention, once again representing Charente- Inférieure. He served briefly as President of the National Convention in February 1793. More importantly, Bréard served on the Committee of General Security from October 1792 to January 1793, as well as the Committee of Public Safety from April 1793 to June 1793, July 1794 to December 1794, and January 1795 to May 1795.

== Revolution ==
During his time on the Committee of Public Safety, Bréard was sent on mission to Brest to manage the organization of a more effective coastal defense in the vital naval town. When Jean Bon Saint-André departed from Brest for a brief period, Bréard was left in charge, and succumbed to the demands of his overzealous and unruly followers. He authorized the formation of a Revolutionary Tribunal during the beginning of the Terror, despite Saint André’s opposition. He was bullied by the local Jacobin Club into placing Jacobin allies, many of them incompetent and inexperienced, into offices carrying responsibility. Bréard also dispatched activist groups into neighboring districts to indoctrinate the local people with their radical brand of republicanism, including the corrupt agitator Dagorne. In September 1793, a planned naval mutiny was uncovered, and Bréard ordered the imprisonment of thirty members of the fleet. A full investigation into the mutiny did not commence until Saint André arrived back five days later. When Saint André returned to Brest he mitigated Bréard’s more radical measures, and returned emphasis to construction and other infrastructure projects. Bréard was originally replaced in his post at Brest by Laignelot, who favored implementing even more radical measures. Laignelot was subsequently reproached by Saint André. However, as France shifted to an offensive posture in preparation for a planned naval invasion of Britain, some harsh policies remained in place to prevent insurrection or instability.

Although Bréard was originally a member of the Montagnard faction, he supported the Thermidorian Reaction that began with Robespierre’s downfall in July 1794. He outlasted the collapse of the Committee of Public Safety and Robespierre’s faction, and served in the Conseil des Anciens (Council of Ancients) as a deputy of Charente-Inférieure from 1795 to 1798. He also supported the Coup of 18 Brumaire in 1799, orchestrated by Abbé Sieyès, by which the Directory was overthrown and replaced with the French Consulate, with General Napoleon Bonaparte at the helm.

== Later life ==
Bréard was nominated to the Corps Législatif in 1799, and served as President of the Corps Législatif for two weeks from 6 January 1801, to 21 January 1801. He worked as an administrator of the Paris post office, was banished in 1816 after the Restoration, and did not return to France until 1830. He died on 2 January 1840, in Paris.

== Works cited ==
- "Biography of Jean-Jacques Bréard." Archontology.org. 26 June 2009. Web. 26 October 2009. <http://www.archontology.org/nations/france/convention_1792_95/breard.php.>.
- Cormack, William S. Revolution and Political Conflict in the French Navy 1789-1794. Cambridge: Cambridge UP, 1995. Print.
- Palmer, Robert Roswell. Twelve Who Ruled. Princeton: Princeton, 1941, 217-218. Print.
