= Jeanbon Saint-André =

French politician (1749–1813)

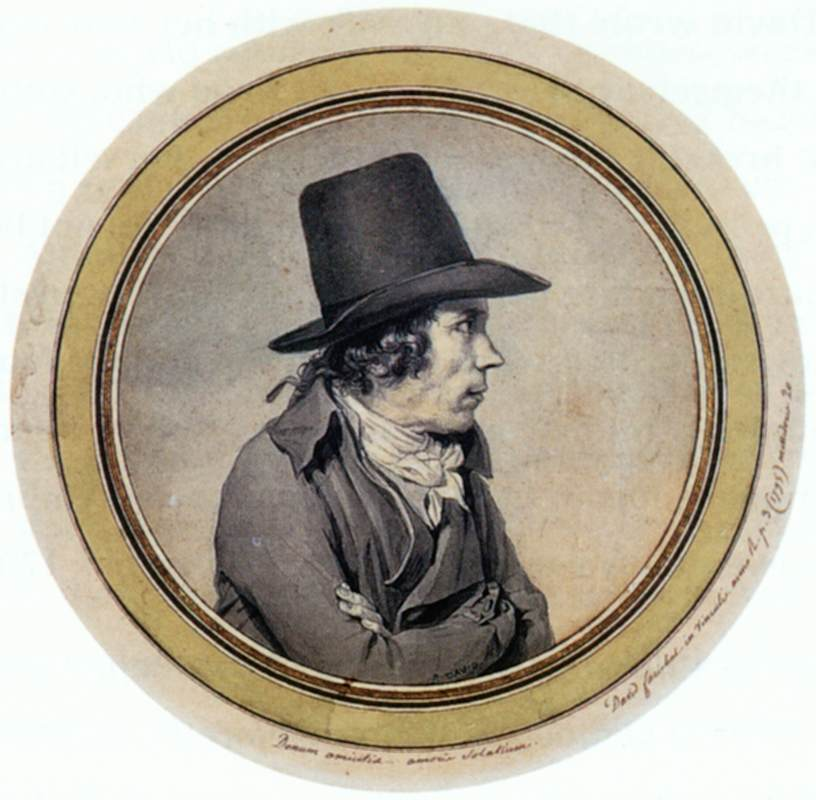
- Portrait by Jacques-Louis David

Deputy in the National Convention
- In office 5 September 1792 – 26 October 1795
- Constituency: Lot

22nd President of the National Convention
- In office 11 July 1793 – 25 July 1793
- Preceded by: Jacques-Alexis Thuriot
- Succeeded by: Georges Danton

Personal details
- Born: 25 February 1749 Montauban, Quercy, Kingdom of France
- Died: 10 December 1813 (aged 64) Mainz, Grand Duchy of Frankfurt
- Party: The Mountain
- Awards: Knight (1804) and Officer (1813) of the Legion of Honor; Baron of the Empire

Jeanbon Saint-André (French pronunciation: [ʒɑ̃bɔ̃ sɛ̃tɑ̃dʁe]; 25 February 1749 – 10 December 1813) was a French politician of the Revolutionary era.

== Early career and role in the National Convention ==
He was born in Montauban (Tarn-et-Garonne), the son of a fuller. Although his parents were Protestants, Saint-André was raised by the Jesuits at Marseille, and got baptized, as required by law. As a young boy, Saint-André had ambition to study the law, but his dream was crushed when the King prohibited Protestants and their children from getting involved in much of the public life, including getting the bar. When Saint-André was about sixteen years old, he enrolled in the merchant marine, and became lieutenant several years later and shortly after, captain. In 1771, after three shipwrecks and the loss of all his savings, he abandoned this career. Saint-André later turned Protestant, and became a prominent pastor in Southern France at Castres in 1773, and afterwards in Montauban in 1788. Saint-André studied theology in Geneva for three years, and married Marie de Suc in 1780. Right before the outbreak of the French Revolution, tension between Protestants and Catholics caused Saint-André to flee. During this time, he drafted an article entitled, "Considérations sur l'organisation civile des Eglises protestantes" (Thoughts on the civil organisation of Protestants), which advocated for protecting Protestants' religious rights within France. Saint-André later returned around December, 1790. He then found The Society of the Friends of the Constitution, and started his political career. On 2 November 1792 Saint-André was elected president of the Jacobins.

As a member of The Society of the Friends of the Constitution, Saint-André sat on The Mountain, led by Maximilien Robespierre. When King Louis XVI was found guilty of plotting against the Convention and France, he, along with many members of the Convention, voted for the King's execution. In September 1792, he opposed the punishment of the authors of the September Massacres. In January 1793, Saint-André expressed his ideas in a speech called "Sur l'Education nationale," which demanded a variety of changes to the old Catholic-controlled education system. Later that same year in June, when the Jacobins gained control of the Assembly Saint-André became a member of the Committee of Public Safety, and it was he who proposed Maximilien Robespierre for membership shortly afterwards. In July 1793, Saint-André was elected President of the National Convention, and in his capacity, he announced the death of Marat. That same month, Saint-André was sent on a mission to the Armies of the East fighting in the Revolutionary Wars.

While working with the Committee of Public Safety, Jeanbon Saint-André played a pivotal role in the restoration of the naval fleet. He was a former Huguenot pastor and merchant sea captain who was considered the Montagnards’ expert on naval affairs. The Convention granted Saint-André an unlimited amount of power in order to preserve the fleet for the Republic, and to crush all forms of counter-revolutionary opposition.

== Reign of Terror ==
On the Committee of Public Safety, his main responsibility was the navy, which he took over from Bertrand Barère. On September 20, 1793, Saint-André obtained a vote of one hundred million francs for constructing vessels; from September 1793 to January 1794, he reorganized the military harbours of Brest and Cherbourg, in the northwestern coast of France. Saint-André noticed striking parallels between the situation in Brest and in the Committee's occupation of Toulon after its siege in late 1793. Toulon became the stigma of dishonor and treason due to its defection in 1793. The city of Toulon, in revolt against the National Convention, was under the control of a coalition of forces opposed to the republican regime in Paris, including French royalists and federalists along with the militaries of Britain, Spain, Naples, Sicily and Sardinia.

In 1793, the Federalist Revolt against the National Assembly in the port city of Brest was partly linked to Jeanbon Saint-André as its citizens viewed the Navy divided between the two major clubs, the Montagnards and the Girondins. He reported that the destruction of the French fleet was a form of conspiracy against the Republic. His theory was clear: the parallels he was observing between the situations at Brest and Toulon were based on the conspiracy of ex-nobles and officers against the Republic, as well as the presence of British influence in both cities. Both problems contributed to the task set before Saint-André - achieving unity within the French Navy. In response to the Quibéron mutinies, Jeanbon removed Captains Kerguelen, Thomas, Bonnefous, and Larichery from their positions. Saint-André also arrested six more officers, and sent them off to Paris for trial. He later established a Revolutionary Tribunal, which trialled and sentenced the death of ten naval officers. This caused anti-revolutionists, including Oscar Havard, to believe Jeanbon conspired to hand Brest over to British control; Jeanbon's true motives was to bring the downfall of the Navy in response to the dominance of Catholicism in French society.

Under Saint-André's command, the Naval regime was reformed in such a way that the "lowest seaman could aspire to the rank of admiral". He also expressed Jacobin ideas through a policy he created in which all Navy workers received equal benefits and treatments. The Western regions of France became problematic to the Revolution. The physical location of Brittany, a peninsula with poorly paved roads, and specifically Brest, made transport of provisions and travel difficult and time-consuming. Aside from the physical aspects of Brittany's separation from the rest of the Nation, the gabelle (the salt tax) played a significant role in isolating the Province. This was a zone of the "redimes," also known as a tax-free zone. Both of these aspects contributed to the separation of Brittany from the rest of the country. Brittany was, however, still of strategic significance to the Committee of Public Safety. The Committee believed that utilizing the city as a seaport for the French fleet would allow them to galvanize a fleet of ships to sail to the nearby southern peninsula of England in order to begin an offensive effort.

Saint-André sought to regain control of Brittany by eliminating the easy-going and inattentive eyes of the old regime, emphasizing how "the negligence of a sleepy tyrant or of somnolent ministers does not agree with our [republican] principles." On 20 November 1793, Saint-André and Jean-Jacques Bréard, another agent of the Committee, issued a decree with a regular naval penal code, a code which was later sanctioned by the Convention and applied to the entire navy.

== Downfall of Jacobin and later missions ==
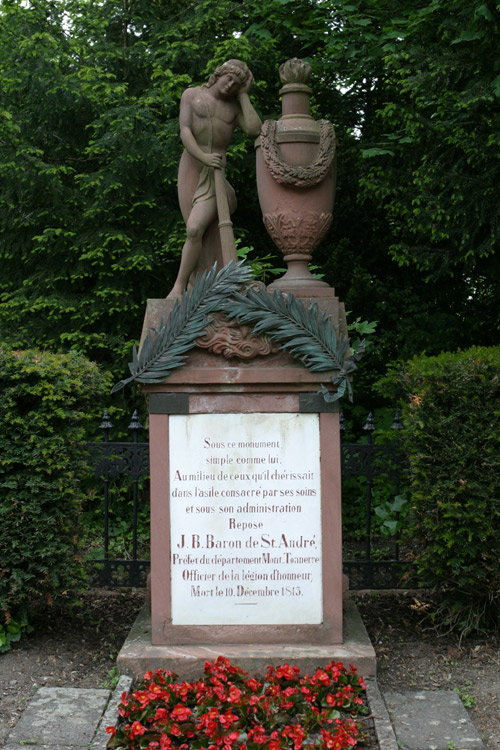
Tomb of Jeanbon St. André at the Mainz Main Cemetery

On 31 January 1794, on his return from Brest, Saint-André presented a report to the Convention on the state of the navy. Saint-André did away with the hierarchical system of the old regime's navy, stripping officers of their traditional luxuries, such as food privileges, and emphasizing the need for officers to set an obedient example. An education system was also implemented, utilizing Jacobin propaganda and schoolmasters who taught the sailors to read and write so they could aspire to promotion. Saint-André also eliminated holidays, industrializing the coastal city into a system split into day and night shifts enforced by strict military rule. Royalist officers were imprisoned, discipline restored, and a new regime of training introduced across the navy. The officer corps and civilian administration of the navy were brought up to strength. Lighthouses were built at Penmarch and Groix, and new ships of the line were built. These changes sought to turn Brest into an absolute collectivist city, where all was at service to the Republic. Thanks to this reforming zeal, France was able to build and launch new frigates at three times the rate of the Royal Navy during the same period. By 1794, under Saint-André's watch, fifty ships of the line had been placed into service under the control of the newly appointed fleet commander Villaret de Joyeuse.

Contributing to this success was the presence of Jacques-Noël Sané, a renowned ship engineer who had built Joyeuse's 118-gun flagship Montagne. Though the reformation of the navy has not had as much historical acclaim as the work other Committee members performed on the army, with many critics pointing to its losses in the battle of the Glorious First of June in 1794, the reforms that took place were nonetheless vital in ensuring France's continued success in war.

On 15 February 1794 Saint-André made the red, white, and blue vertical stripes flag the national flag of France. Saint-André later participated in a mission in the south, which lasted from July 1794 to March 1795, and in which he showed moderation in contrast to the directives of the Reign of Terror. Shortly after, he was arrested on May 28, 1795 and imprisoned at the College of Four Nations, but was released by the amnesty of the year IV. During this time, Saint-André wrote about his experiences in the Turkish cells entitled, "Tale of my captivity on the banks of the Black Sea." On 28 July 1794, the Jacobin faction lost support of the crowd and most of its members, most notably Robespierre, were guillotined; the crowd saw that Saint-André had mostly spent his time on mission and had not participated in the decisions made during the Jacobins' control, so he was granted his life. However, with the Jacobin bourgeoisie, he had justified the impediment of the representations of the people, which are the sectional societies: "Our greatest enemies are not outside; we see them: they are in our midst; they want to take revolutionary measures further than we do. "

He was then appointed consul at Algiers and Smyrna (1798) and was kept prisoner by the Ottoman Empire for three years (during the Napoleonic Wars). Released in 1801, Saint-André subsequently became préfet of the department of Mont-Tonnerre (1801) and commissary-general of the three departments on the left bank of the Rhine. Napoleon made him a member of the Légion d'honneur in 1804 and a Baron of the Empire in 1809. He died of typhoid in Mainz.

== Suggested Reading ==
- Levy-Schneider, Le Conventionnel Jean bon St André. (Paris, 1901).
- Come, Donald R. French Threat to British Shores, 1793-1798. Military Affairs 16.4 (1952): 174. Google Scholar. Web. 24 Feb. 2016.
- Frey, Linda, and Marsha Frey. The French Revolution. Westport, CT: Greenwood, 2004. Print. ISBN 978-0313321931
- Popkin, J. D. A Short History of the French Revolution. Hoboken: Pearson Education, 2014. Print. ISBN 978-0205693573
