= Jean-Paul Rabaut Saint-Étienne =

French revolutionary (1743–1793)

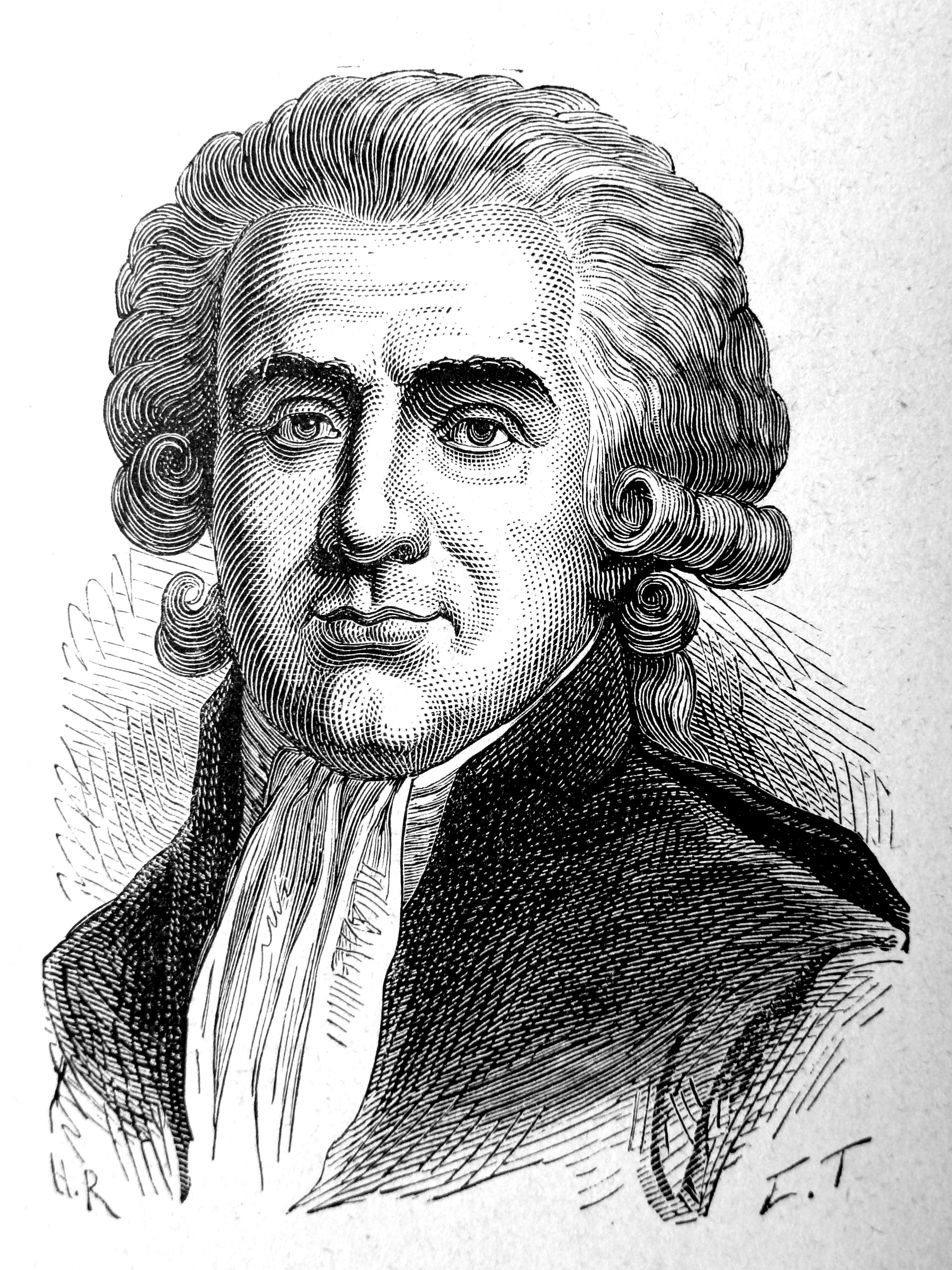

10th President of the National Convention
- In office 24 January 1793 – 7 February 1793
- Preceded by: Pierre Victurnien Vergniaud
- Succeeded by: Jean-Jacques Bréard

Deputy to the Estates-General for the Third Estate

Personal details
- Born: 14 November 1743 Nîmes, Languedoc, Kingdom of France
- Died: 5 December 1793 (aged 50) Paris, French First Republic
- Cause of death: Execution by Guillotine
- Parent: Paul Rabaut (father)
- Relatives: Jacques Antoine Rabaut (brother)
- Education: University of Lausanne
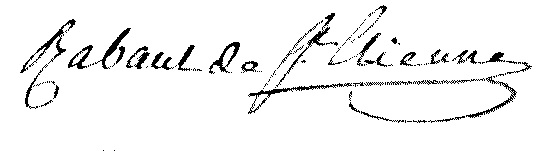
- Signature

Jean-Paul Rabaut Saint-Étienne (French pronunciation: [ʒɑ̃ pɔl ʁabo sɛ̃.t‿etjɛn]; 14 November 1743 – 5 December 1793) was a leader of the French Protestants and a moderate French revolutionary.

== Biography ==
Jean-Paul Rabaut was born in 1743 in Nîmes, in Languedoc (now in the department of Gard), the son of Désert preacher Paul Rabaut. The additional surname of Saint-Étienne was assumed from a small property near Nîmes. His brothers were Jacques Antoine Rabaut-Pommier and Pierre-Antoine Rabaut-Dupuis, both also politically active.

Like his father, he became a Calvinist pastor, and distinguished himself with his zeal for his co-religionists, becoming a spokesman for the Protestant community in France. He worked closely with Guillaume-Chrétien de Lamoignon de Malesherbes, minister to Louis XVI, and with members of the parlement of the Ancien Régime to obtain formal recognition of Protestant civil rights, despite the concerns of some royal advisors.

Officially ending religious persecution in France, Louis XVI signed the Edict of Tolerance on 7 November 1787, and it was registered in parlement two-and-a-half months later (29 January 1788). This edict offered relief to Calvinist Huguenots. The wording of the edict may suggest broader tolerance of other non-Catholic faiths, however Lutherans and Jews were covered by a separate edict. After more than a century of prohibition, the Edict of Tolerance significantly expanded upon the rights afforded to Calvinists. Rabaut Saint-Étienne also wrote a letter in response to this Edict, in which he proposed a number of potential alterations.

Full religious freedom had to wait two more years for the Declaration of the Rights of Man and Citizen of 1789, but the 1787 Edict of Tolerance was a pivotal step in subduing religious strife, and it officially ended religious persecution in France.

Having gained a reputation with his Histoire primitive de la Grèce, Rabaut de Saint-Étienne was elected deputy to the Estates-General of 1789 by the third estate of the bailliage of Nîmes.

In the Constituent Assembly, he worked on the framing of the constitution; he spoke against the establishment of the republic, which he considered ridiculous; and voted for the suspensive veto, as likely to strengthen the position of the Crown. He was elected president of the Assembly for the duration of a fortnight on 14 March 1790. In the Convention, he sat among the Girondists, opposed the trial of Louis XVI, was a member of the Commission of Twelve, which conducted an investigation into the Commune of Paris, and was proscribed with his party. He was also elected president of the Convention for a week on 23 January 1793.

In Frimaire of Year II (December 1793), he and his brother, who were hiding at Citizen Peyssac’s home in the Faubourg Poissonnière (an old neighborhood in Paris), were arrested after being denounced. He was brought before the Revolutionary Tribunal and sentenced to death that very day. His brother was imprisoned.

He remained in hiding for some time, but he was ultimately discovered and guillotined by the radical revolutionary government in December 1793.
