= Pierre Antoine Laloy =

French politician (1749-1846)

30th President of the National Convention
- In office 6 November 1793 – 21 November 1793
- Preceded by: Moyse Bayle
- Succeeded by: Gilbert Romme

Personal details
- Born: Pierre Antoine Laloy; 16 January 1749 Doulevant-le-Château, Haute-Marne, France
- Died: 16 March 1846 (aged 97) Chaumont, Haute-Marne, France

Pierre Antoine Laloy (16 January 1749 – 16 March 1846) was a French politician who was a President of the National Convention from 6 November 1793 until 21 November 1793.
