= Jean-Marie Collot d'Herbois =

French actor, writer and revolutionary (1749–1796)

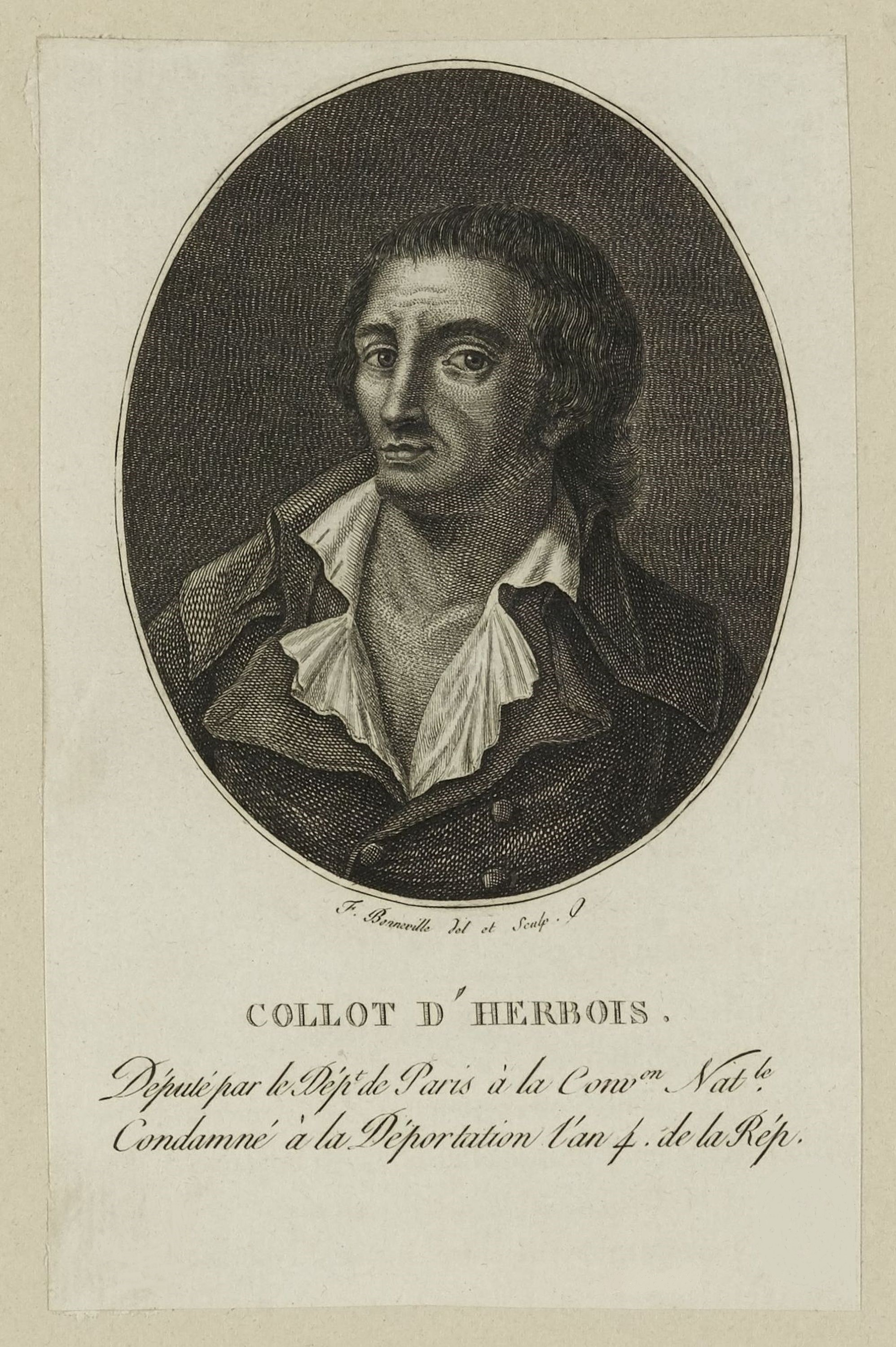

20th & 47th President of the National Convention
- In office 19 July 1794 – 3 August 1794
- Preceded by: Jean-Antoine Louis
- Succeeded by: Philippe-Antoine Merlin
- In office 13 June 1793 – 27 June 1793
- Preceded by: François René Mallarmé
- Succeeded by: Jacques-Alexis Thuriot

Personal details
- Born: 19 June 1749 Paris, France
- Died: 8 June 1796 (aged 46) Cayenne, French Guiana
- Cause of death: Yellow fever
- Citizenship: French
- Party: the Mountain
- Occupation: Actor; dramatist; essayist; revolutionary
- Known for: member of the Committee of Public Safety, execution of more than 2,000 people in Lyon

Jean-Marie Collot d'Herbois (English: /kɒˈloʊ/ ko-LOH, French: [ʒɑ̃ maʁi kɔlo dɛʁbwa]; 19 June 1749 – 8 June 1796) was a French actor, dramatist, essayist, and revolutionary. He was a member of the Committee of Public Safety during the Reign of Terror and, while he saved Madame Tussaud from the Guillotine, he administered the execution of more than 2,000 people in the city of Lyon.

== Early life ==
Born in Paris, Collot left his home in the rue St. Jacques in his teens to join the travelling theatres of provincial France. His moderately successful career as an actor, supplemented by a vigorous outpouring of works for the stage, took him from Bordeaux in the south of France to Nantes in the west and Lille in the north and even into the Dutch Republic, where he met his wife.

In 1784 he became director of the theatre in Geneva, Switzerland, and then at the prestigious playhouse at Lyon in 1787. At the outbreak of the Revolution in 1789 he dropped everything and returned to Paris, where his lead actor's voice, his writing skills, and his ability to organise and direct large-scale fêtes (civic feasts) were to make him famous.

== Activism ==
Collot contributed to revolutionary agitation from the very beginning, but it was not until 1791 that he became a figure of importance. With the publication of L'Almanach du Père Gérard, an almanac advocating a constitutional monarchy in popular terms, he suddenly acquired great popularity.

His fame was soon increased by his involvement on behalf of the Swiss of the Château-Vieux Regiment, condemned to the galleys for mutiny at Nancy. Collot d'Herbois' efforts resulted in their freedom, he went to Brest in search of them, and a civic feast was held on his behalf and theirs, which occasioned a poem by André de Chénier.

His opinions became more and more radical as the revolution progressed. Collot d'Herbois was a member of the Paris Commune during the insurrection of 10 August 1792 and was subsequently elected deputy for Paris to the National Convention. On the first day of the Convention, 21 September 1792, he was the first to demand the abolition of the French monarchy. Collot d'Herbois later voted for the death of Louis XVI "sans sursis" ("without delay").

== Terror, Thermidor, deportation and death ==
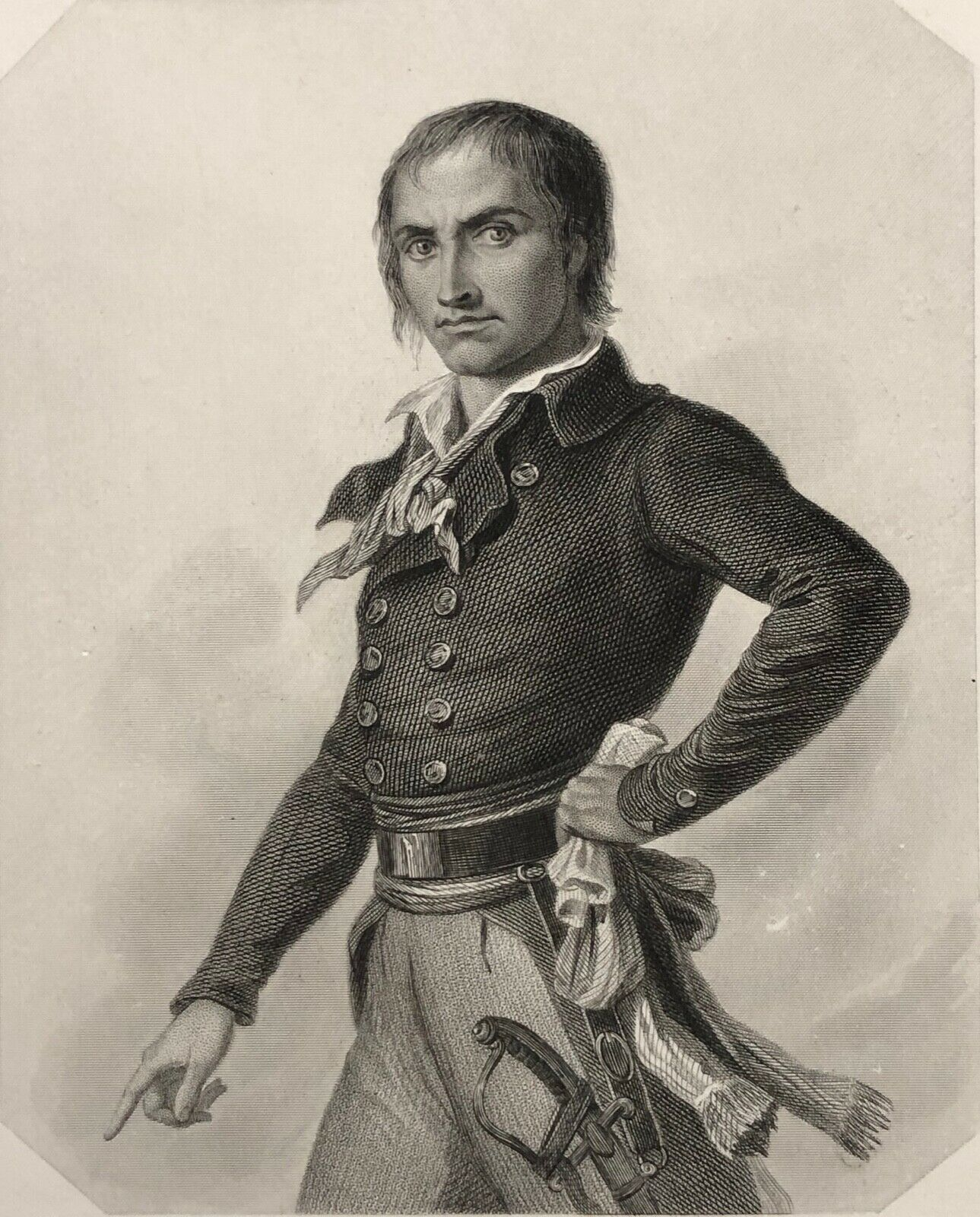
Collot d'Herbois by Auguste Raffet

After the insurrection of August 10 and the establishment of the National Convention, Collot d'Herbois became engaged in the struggle between the two main political parties, the Mountain and the Girondists. After François Hanriot's coup d'état of 31 May 1793 and the ousting of the Girondins, he was conspicuous in his attack on the defeated party. Along with his close friend Jacques-Nicolas Billaud-Varenne, he sat at the extreme left of the Convention, attacking speculators and proposing egalitarian programmes. In June, he was made President of the Convention, and in September he was appointed with Billaud-Varenne to the Committee of Public Safety, where he was active as a sort of general secretary.

After having entrusted him with several missions to Nice, Nevers, and Compiègne, the Convention sent him, along with Joseph Fouché, on 30 October 1793, to punish the revolt of Lyon. There, he introduced the Reign of Terror in its most violent form, with mass executions, including more than a hundred priests and nuns, and began the dismantling of the city itself. His excessive behavior led the Committee of Public Safety to have Collot return to Paris as a suspect.

The month of May 1794 saw assassination attempts on Collot on the 23rd and fellow Committee member Maximilien Robespierre on the 25th. As Collot was accused of excessive slaughter and destruction, and suspected his own arrest and execution, he opposed Robespierre during the Thermidorian Reaction in July 1794 while presiding over the Convention during the initial session. Despite this change of heart, Collot d'Herbois was accused of complicity with Robespierre, the two having previously been colleagues on the Committee of Public Safety, but was acquitted. Denounced a second time, he defended himself by pleading that he had acted for the Revolution, but, in March 1795, he was condemned with Bertrand Barère and Billaud-Varenne to transportation to Cayenne, French Guiana, where he exerted a brief revolutionary influence before dying of yellow fever in 1796.

== Works ==
Beginning his literary career in 1772 with the critically acclaimed Lucie, ou les Parents imprudents and finishing in 1792 with L'Aîné et le cadet, Collot was an accomplished, if minor, dramatist in a turbulent period of the French stage.

Before the Revolution, he wrote at least fifteen plays, of which ten survive, including Lucie, an adaptation of William Shakespeare's The Merry Wives of Windsor (titled, M. Rodomont, ou l'Amant loup-garou), and an adaptation of Pedro Calderón de la Barca's El Alcalde de Zalamea (titled, Il y a bonne justice, ou le Paysan magistrat), all three of which kept the stage throughout France for over a decade. During the first three years of the Revolution he wrote at least seven more plays, of which six survive, juggling the tearful love themes of le drame bourgeois (lit. 'the bourgeois drama') with political themes and messages in such plays as L'Inconnu, ou le Préjugé vaincu (lit. 'The Unknown, or Prejudice Conquered') and Socrate (on Socrates).

In 1791, he wrote the prize-winning L'Almanach du père Gérard (lit. 'The Almanac of Father Gérard'), a fictional account of revolutionary morality which went on to become the best-seller of the period, establishing his political credentials in the process.

He was also one of the authors of the first French republican Constitution, which was written in 1793 but never applied.

== Bibliography ==
- Much recent study has been done on Collot d'Herbois, in Australia (articles by Paul Mansfield - 'Collot d'Herbois and the Dechristianizers', Journal of Religious History, volume 14, number 4 (December, 1987), pp. 406–18; 'The Repression of Lyon, 1793-4: Origins, Responsibility and Significance', French History, volume 2, number 1 (March, 1988), pp. 74–101; 'Collot d'Herbois at the Committee of Public Safety: a revaluation', English Historical Review, volume 103, number 2 (March, 1988), pp. 565–87; 'The Management of Terror in Montagnard Lyon, Year II', European History Quarterly, volume 20, number 4 (October, 1990), pp. 467–98; 'Collot d'Herbois in the Theatre of the Old Regime: homme de lettres or "poor hack"?', Australian Journal of French Studies, volume 27, number 2 (1990), pp. 107–120; Peter Bruce's "Jean-Marie Collot d'Herbois dans son théâtre pré-révolutionnaire"; and in France (Michel Biard Collot d'Herbois. Légendes noires et révolution).
- A more easily obtainable work is R. R. Palmer's Twelve Who Ruled, which contains a biographical account of the members of the Committee of Public Safety.
- A. Kuscinski Dictionnaire des conventionnels (1916)
