= Anglès, Tarn =

Anglès
- Commune
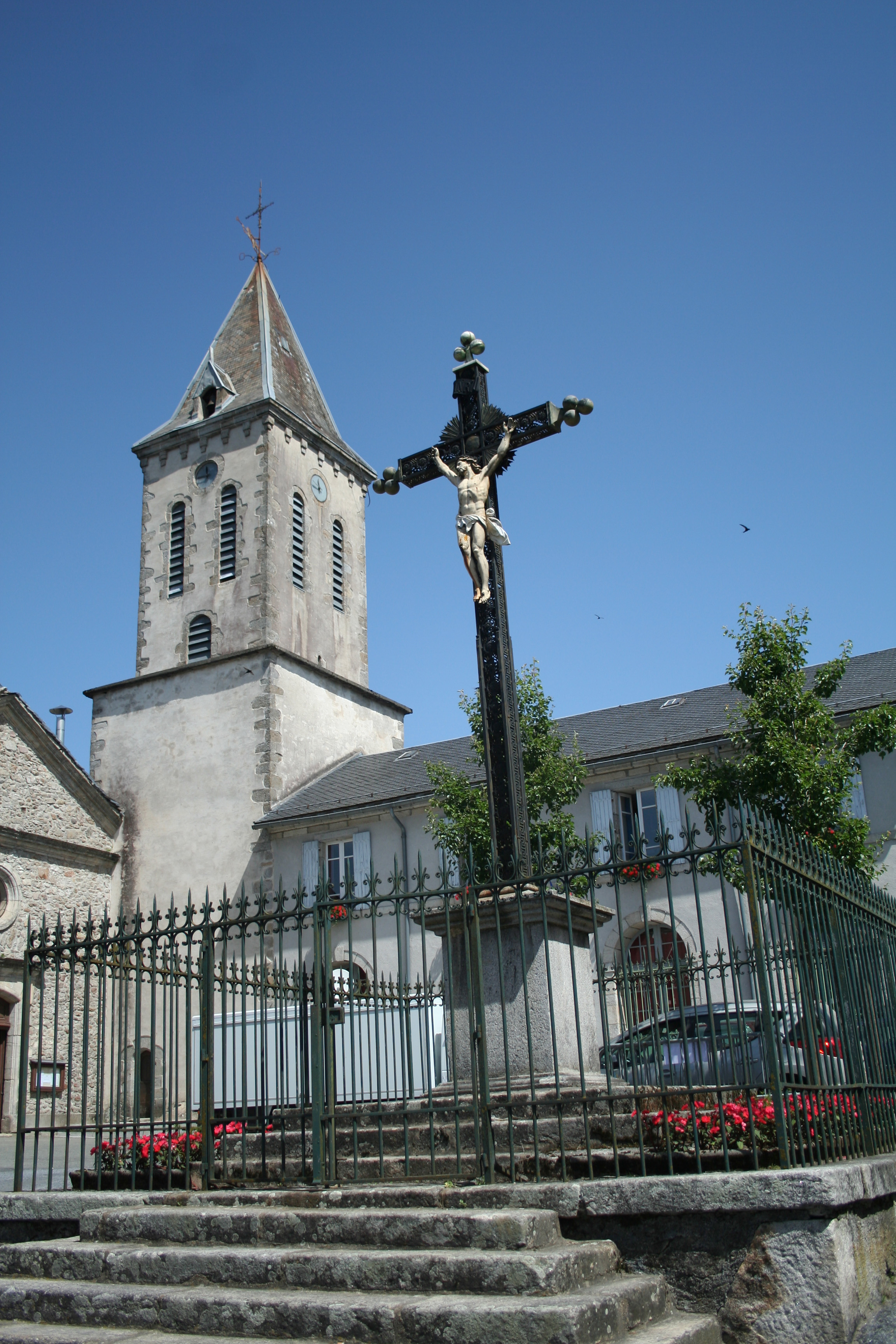
- The church and cross in Anglès

- Coat of arms
- Location of Anglès
- Location within France Location within Occitanie
- Coordinates: 43°33′52″N 2°33′42″E
- Country: France
- Region: Occitania
- Department: Tarn
- Arrondissement: Castres
- Canton: Les Hautes Terres d'Oc
- Intercommunality: CC du Haut-Languedoc

Government
  - Mayor (2020–2026): Alain Barthes
- Area^{1}: 85.62 km^{2} (33.06 sq mi)
- Elevation: 750 m (2,460 ft)
- Highest elevation: 967 m (3,173 ft)
- Lowest elevation: 358 m (1,175 ft)
- Population (2023): 515
  - Density: 6.01/km^{2} (15.6/sq mi)
- Time zone: UTC+01:00 (CET)
  - Summer (DST): UTC+02:00 (CEST)
- INSEE/Postal code: 81014 /81260
- ^{1} French Land Register data, which excludes lakes, ponds, glaciers > 1 km^{2} (0.386 sq mi or 247 acres) and river estuaries.

Anglès (French pronunciation: [ɑ̃ɡlɛs]; Occitan: Anglés) is a commune in the Tarn department in southern France.

== Geography ==
The Thoré forms part of the commune's southern border.

== See also ==
- Communes of the Tarn department
