= The Plain =

1791–1795 independent deputies during the French Revolution

The Plain La Plaine
- Main members: Félix-Julien-Jean Bigot de Préameneu; François-Antoine de Boissy d'Anglas; Jean-Jacques-Régis de Cambacérès; Lazare Carnot; Emmanuel-Joseph Sieyès
- Founded: 6 September 1791; 234 years ago
- Dissolved: 2 November 1795; 230 years ago
- Headquarters: Tuileries Palace, Paris
- Newspaper: Journal des débats
- Ideology: Liberalism (French); Republicanism (French)
- Colors: Grey

The Plain (French: la Plaine), also known as the Marsh (French: le Marais), was the majority of independent deputies in the National Convention during the French Revolution. They were the most moderate and the most numerous group (around 400 deputies) of the National Convention, as they sat between the Girondins on their right and the Montagnards (the Mountain) on their left. Their name arises from the fact their benches were by the debating floor, lower down from the Montagnards. Its members were also known as Maraisards, or derogatorily Toads (French: crapauds du Marais) as toads live in marshes.

Coming mostly from the liberal and republican bourgeoisie, the Plain was attached to the political conquests of 1789 and to the work of the French Revolution and wanted the union of all republicans. In practice, this group was very heterogeneous as it included noblemen and clericals like Henri Grégoire, François Antoine de Boissy d'Anglas, Jean-Jacques-Régis de Cambacérès, and Emmanuel Joseph Sieyès; at the same time, some of its members like Bertrand Barère, Pierre-Joseph Cambon, Lazare Carnot, and Georges Couthon joined the Montagnards in the spring of 1793.

At the time of the Montagnards' seizure of power (the days of 31 May and 2 June 1793), their centrist position at the National Convention remained ambiguous. While the Plain deputies tried to play the role of mediators, they admitted the merits of the public safety measures voted with their support, or even their impetus, for several months; however, most of them demonstrated their hostility towards Maximilien Robespierre on 9 Thermidor, Year II, by rallying the instigators of the plot who were representatives on a mission recalled to Paris (Paul Barras, Joseph Fouché, Louis-Marie Stanislas Fréron, and Jean-Lambert Tallien).

== Naming ==
The Plain and Marsh names come from their position, which was compared with the geographical areas of plain and marsh and by opposition to the Montagnards. The newspaper L'Ami du peuple is credited with having invented the term Marsh in reference to the Plain. Its members were sometimes disdainfully called by their adversaries the "toads of the Marais". Pierre Joseph Duhem, a Montagnard deputy, was quoted as saying: "The toads of the Marais are raising their heads! So much the better; it will be easier to cut them off."

The origin of the name continues to be debated. If the name Girondins to describe the group of Jacques Pierre Brissot's followers is simply explained by their geographical origin, those of the Montagnards and the members of the Plain continue to raise questions because several interpretations are possible. The most widespread consists of sticking to the letter of the terms used: the Montagnard deputies sat on the left on the highest benches of this assembly, hence the reference to the Mountain, and those of the Plain on the lower benches. This classification is already present in an ancient text that many revolutionaries read, the "Life of Solon" from the Parallel Lives, where Plutarch (taking up the texts of Herodotus and Aristotle) describes the political divisions in Ancient Athens in these terms: "The Hill-men favoured an extreme democracy; the Plain-men an extreme oligarchy; the Shore-men formed a third party, which preferred an intermediate and mixed form of government, was opposed to the other two, and prevented either from gaining the ascendancy." (Note: As quoted in Plutarch (1914). "Lives of Solon". Parallel Lives. Translated by Perrin, Bernadotte. London: Heinemann – via Perseus Digital Library of Tufts University.) Biblical and evangelical references are also present because the Mountain is perceived as a new Mount Sinai (with the Declaration of the Rights of Man and of the Citizen as a new Decalogue), with further references to the Sermon on the Mount of Jesus.

== History ==
During its existence, the Plain represented centrist positions; however, it was not static and evolved. The Plain was more centrist starting from the National Convention that began in 1792 and ended in 1795, and during this time the Plain's independent deputies represented its largest group. As member of the Jacobin Club, the Plain was initially part of the left-wing groups. The 1791 French legislative election resulted in a majority of around 350 moderate constitutionalists (the Plain), followed by more than 250 Feuillants (divided into Fayettists and Lametists), and a left-wing made up of around 136 Jacobin deputies, including several provincial politicians (including Armand Gensonné, Marguerite-Élie Guadet, and Pierre Victurnien Vergniaud, originally from Gironde, hence the name of the Girondins), with a small group of more advanced democrats (Lazare Carnot, Georges Couthon, and Jean-Baptiste Robert Lindet). Parliamentary groups, such as the Plain, the Montagnards, and the Girondins, never had any official status; thus, historians generally tend to estimate the Girondins in the National Convention at around 150 and the Montagnards at around 120, with the remaining 480 of the 750 deputies being called the Plain. Deputies of the Plain managed to keep some speed in the debates while the Montagnards and the Girondins were mainly occupied with nagging the opposite side.

None of Revolutionary France's three main political groups was an organized political party. While the Montagnards and the Girondins consisted of individuals with similar views and agendas who socialized together and often coordinated political plans, the Plain consisted of uncommitted delegates that did not adhere to a single ideology, were not part of any political club, and lacked leadership. They constituted the majority of delegates to the Convention at 389 of 749, and voted with the Girondins or the Montagnards depending on the persuasiveness of arguments on single issues, current circumstances, and mood of the National Convention. They initially sided with the Girondins; by 1793, many backed the Montagnards in executing Louis XVI and inaugurating the Reign of Terror. The January 4 address, made by Plain member Bertrand Barère, is credited in part for rallying undecided fellow members against the king.

Nearly all those elected to the Committee for Public Safety in 1793 were members of the Plain, including the popular Barère. Later in 1794, disaffected Montagnards members led by Jean-Lambert Tallien made a pact with Plain leaders Julien-François Palasne de Champeaux, François Antoine de Boissy d'Anglas and Pierre-Toussaint Durand de Maillane to end the Reign of Terror, ultimately inaugurating the Thermidorian Reaction. Other notable members in 1792 included Emmanuel Joseph Sieyès, Jean-Jacques-Régis de Cambacérès, Antoine Claire Thibaudeau, Henri Grégoire, Philippe-Antoine Merlin de Douai, Louis Gustave le Doulcet de Pontécoulant, Louis Marie de La Révellière-Lépeaux, dramatist Marie-Joseph Chénier, and Jacques-Antoine Dulaure who later sat with the Girondins. Pierre Claude François Daunou who associated with the Girondins has also been regarded as part of the Plain.

== Electoral results ==
Legislative Assembly
Election year	No. of overall votes	% of overall vote	No. of overall seats won	+/–	Leader
1791	1,978,000 (1st)	46.3	345 / 745	New	Félix-Julien-Jean Bigot de Préameneu
National Convention
1792	1,747,200 (1st)	51.9	389 / 749	▲44	Lazare Carnot
Legislative Body
1795	Did not participate	Did not participate	200 / 750	▼189	Jean-Jacques-Régis de Cambacérès

== See also ==
- Citizens: A Chronicle of the French Revolution
- Independent politician
- List of political groups in the French Revolution

== Bibliography ==
- Biard, Michel (2004). "Between the Gironde and the Mountains. The Positions of the Lowland in the National Convention of Spring 1793". Revue historique. 631 (3): 555–576. doi:10.3917/rhis.043.0555. ISSN 0035-3264. Archived from the original on 13 December 2024 – via Cairn.info.
