= Antoine Simon =

French shoemaker and revolutionary (1736–1794)

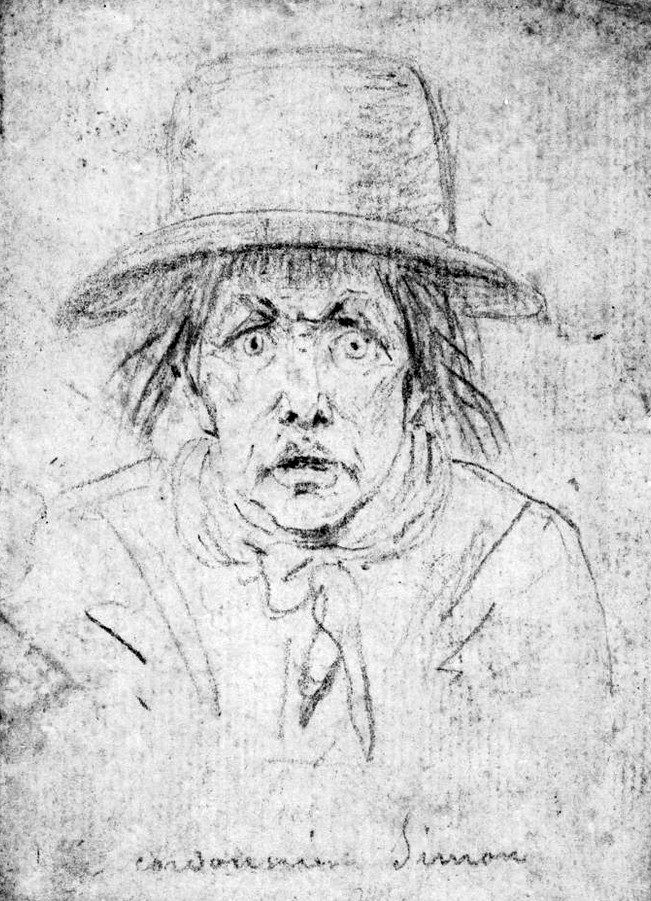

Antoine Simon (1736 – 28 July 1794) was a shoemaker at Rue des Cordeliers in Paris and a member of the Club of the Cordeliers, representative of the Paris Commune. He was born in Troyes, France to François Simon and Marie-Jeanne Adenet. On 3 July 1793, Simon was designated to watch over Louis XVII at the Temple. On 19 January 1794, Simon was removed from his position and left the Temple in company of his wife. On 28 July 1794, Simon was among the 21 to be sent to the guillotine together with Maximilien Robespierre at the Place de la Révolution, today's Place de la Concorde, in Paris, in an execution which marked the end of the Terror. He was buried in the Errancis Cemetery, a common place of interment for those executed during the Revolution.

He married his first wife, Marie-Barbe Hoyau (widow Munster), in November 1766. She died at the Hôtel-Dieu on 11 March 1782. Simon remarried Marie-Jeanne Aladame on 20 May 1788, in the parish of Saint-Côme-Saint-Damien. Marie-Jeanne (born on 25 June 1746, in Saint-Étienne-du-Mont parish, Paris) was a servant and the daughter of Fiacre Aladame (a carpenter) and Reine-Geneviève Aubert. She came to wider attention during the storming of the Tulleries Palace in 1792, for having diligently nursed wounded republicans. Marie-Jeanne outlived her husband and died in Paris in 1819 at the Hospice des Incurables.

Author Georges Bordonove gives the impression of a Simon with limited intelligence, entirely devoted to the ideals of the Revolution, and strongly influenced by political leaders such as Pierre Gaspard Chaumette and Jacques Hébert. Simon seems to have followed Chaumette's idea to "give some education to the prince [...] to make him lose the idea of his rank" (lui donner quelque éducation [...] pour lui faire perdre l'idée de son rang). He requested that his wife Marie-Jeanne help him to care for the boy.

Some authors have portrayed Simon as a violent, vulgar and abusive alcoholic who acted brutally toward the child. Others have claimed that, apart from teaching the boy to sing bawdy songs and to "talk the language of the populace and soldiery", he was otherwise well treated.

== In popular culture ==
In the US television series The Time Tunnel (1966-1967), Simon appears in the episode "Reign of Terror," played by French actor Louis Mercier.

Simon is mentioned in the video game Assassin's Creed Unity as the shoemaker who abused Louis XVII.
