= Errancis Cemetery =

Defunct cemetery in Paris, France

Coordinates: 48°52′51″N 2°19′00″E

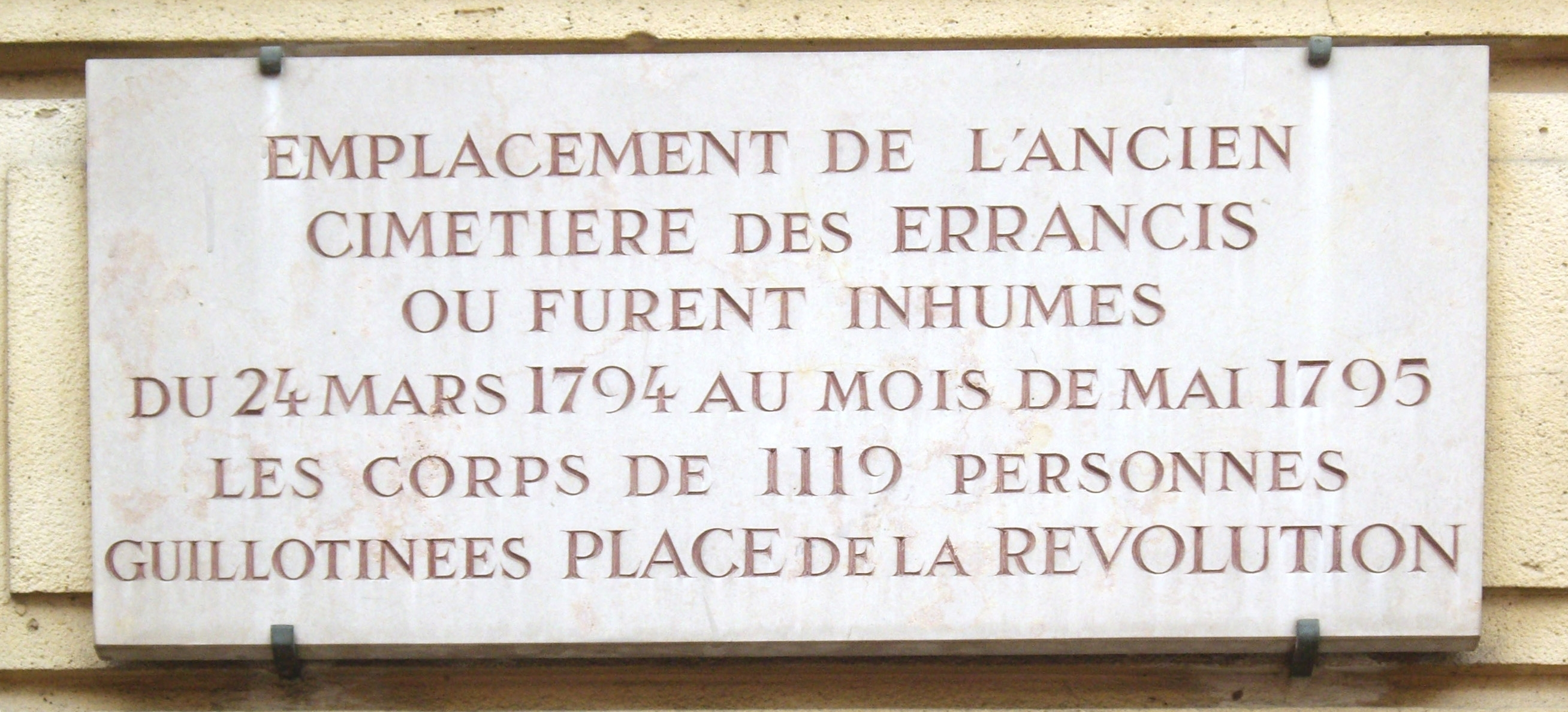
Commemorative plaque for the Errancis Cemetery

Errancis Cemetery or Cimetière des Errancis is a former cemetery in the 8th arrondissement of Paris and was one of the cemeteries (the others being Madeleine Cemetery, Picpus Cemetery, Chapelle expiatoire and the Cemetery of Saint Margaret) used to dispose of the corpses of guillotine victims during the French Revolution.

== History and location ==
Errancis Cemetery opened on March 5, 1793, and was closed on April 23, 1797. On the site there are now apartments. The cemetery was located between the current Boulevard de Courcelles, Rue de Rocher, Rue de Monceau and Rue de Miromesnil, at that time a plot running along le mur des Fermiers-Généraux.

== During the French Revolution ==
The cemetery was used for the bodies of victims of the guillotine after the Madeleine Cemetery was closed. It was used for this purpose between March 25, 1793, until the end of May 1795. The memorial plaque, located on Rue de Monceau between number 97 and the corner with Rue de Rocher, states that 1,119 victims of the guillotine were buried here.

Reputed to have been buried here (amongst the many others), the date is the date of death:

- François Chabot (April 5, 1794)
- Georges Jacques Danton (April 5, 1794)
- Camille Desmoulins (April 5, 1794)
- Philippe Fabre d'Églantine (April 5, 1794)
- Marie-Jean Hérault de Séchelles (April 5, 1794)
- Jean-François Lacroix (April 5, 1794)
- François Joseph Westermann (April 5, 1794)
- Pierre Gaspard Chaumette (April 13, 1794)
- Lucile Duplessis (April 13, 1794), widow of Camille Desmoulins
- Marie Marguerite Françoise Hébert (April 13, 1794), widow of Jacques Hébert
- Antoine-Laurent de Lavoisier (May 8, 1794)
- Madame Élisabeth (May 10, 1794), sister of Louis XVI and Louis XVIII
- François Hanriot (July 28, 1794)
- Maximilien Robespierre (July 28, 1794)
- Louis Antoine de Saint-Just (July 28, 1794)
- Georges Couthon (July 28, 1794)
- Antoine Simon (July 28, 1794)

Famous others:

- Charles-Gilbert Romme (May 20, 1795), after committing suicide, before he could be guillotined. He was a mathematician who is regarded as the father of the Revolutionary calendar.

== After the French Revolution ==
As with the Madeleine Cemetery, the bodies decomposed to a state where they could no longer be identified, this to the dismay of Louis XVIII, who came looking for the remains of his sister, Madame Élisabeth, in 1815. The skeletal remains were moved to the Catacombs of Paris between 1844 and 1859 (probably around 1848) when the Boulevard de Courcelles was constructed. Unlike the other major revolutionary cemetery—the Madeleine Cemetery—there is no plaque in the Catacombs to indicate the location of the transferred bones.

== Notes ==
The literal translation of Cimetière des Errancis is Cemetery of the Wandering.
The cemetery is reputed to have had a sign saying: Dormir. Enfin!, French for: To sleep. At last!.
The cemetery was also known as the resting place of les estropiés, French for the maimed.
The site was originally destined to become a charnier (charnel house).
