= Madeleine Cemetery =

Cemetery in Paris, France

Coordinates: 48°52′25″N 2°19′22″E

Madeleine Cemetery (in French known as Cimetière de la Madeleine) is a former cemetery in the 8th arrondissement of Paris and was one of the four cemeteries (the others being Errancis Cemetery, Picpus Cemetery and the Cemetery of Saint Margaret) used to dispose of the corpses of guillotine victims during the French Revolution. The cemetery was named after Mary Magdalene, known in French as Sainte-Madeleine.

== History ==
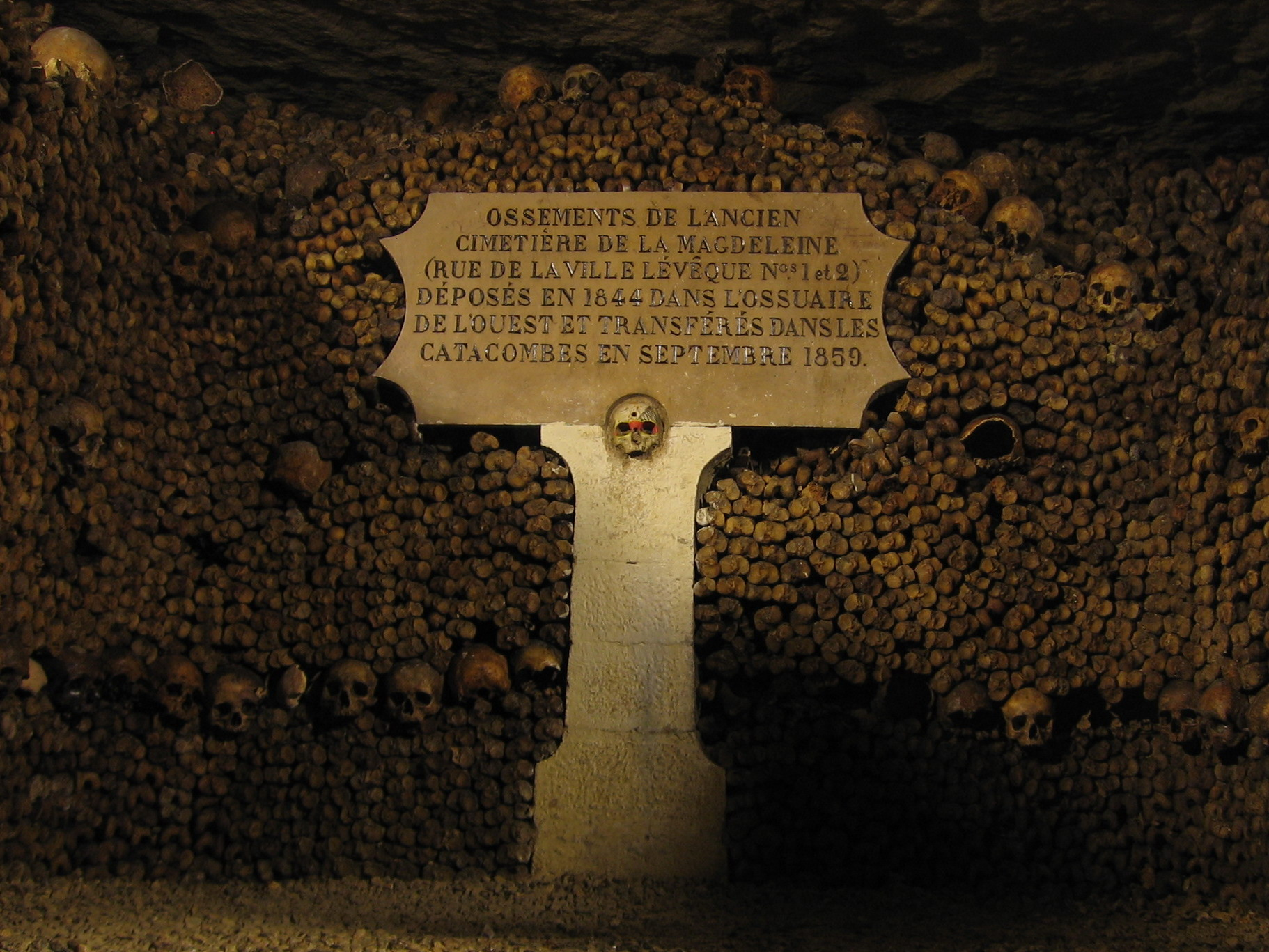
Plaque in the Catacombs of Paris indicating the placement of the bones transferred from the first Madeleine Cemetery located on 1 and 2 rue de la Ville-l'Évêque

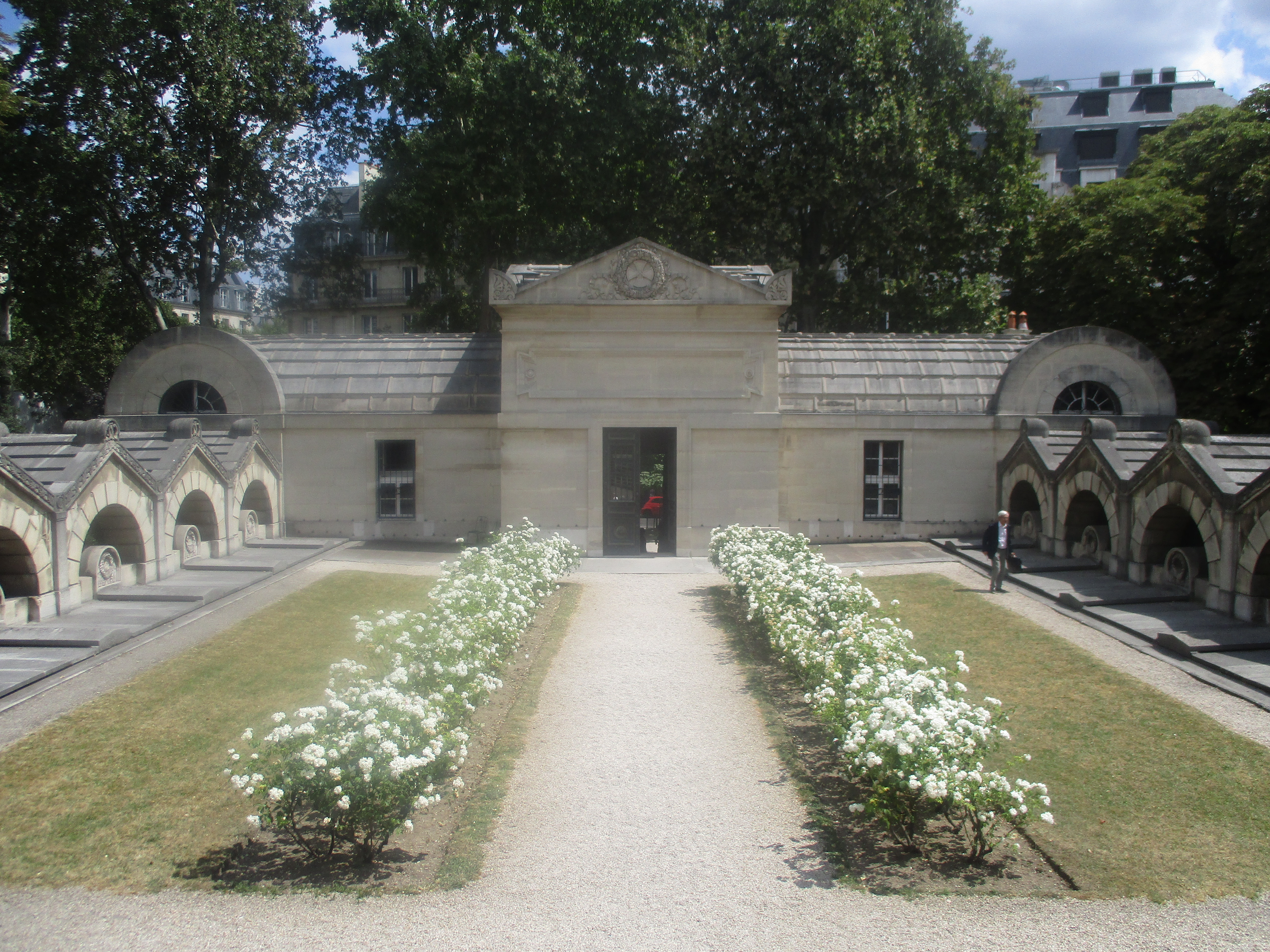
Chapelle expiatoire roses blanches

In 1720, the parish of Sainte-Madeleine de la Ville-l’Évêque bought a piece of land of approximately 45x19m destined to become the third cemetery of the parish. It became known as the Madeleine Cemetery. The cemetery was closed on 25 March 1794, reputedly because it was full, but maybe for sanitary reasons, as it was located in an affluent part of Paris.

Major interments were the 133 victims of the firework celebration of the marriage of the Dauphin (the future Louis XVI) to Marie-Antoinette of Habsburg-Lorraine on 30 May 1770 and those of the Swiss Guards who were massacred in the Tuileries, 10 August 1792.

The day after the execution of the "Hébertists" the cemetery was closed and became private land. The beheaded corpses (victims of the guillotine) were then taken to what was to become the Errancis Cemetery (it remained open for three years but is now also gone).

The land was sold to a stonemason. On 3 June 1802, the land in which the bodies lay, was bought by Pierre-Louis-Olivier Desclozeaux, a royalist magistrate, who had lived adjacent to the cemetery (now Square Louis XVI) since 1789. Desclozeaux had taken note of the sites where the King and Queen were buried and reputedly surrounded them with a hedge, two weeping willows, and cypress trees.

On 11 January 1815, Desclozeaux sold his house and the old cemetery to Louis XVIII. One of the first decisions of Louis XVIII, when he acceded to the throne of France at the time of the Bourbon Restoration, was to move the remains of his brother and sister-in-law, King Louis XVI and Queen Marie Antoinette, to the Basilica of St Denis, the necropolis of the Kings of France. They were exhumed on 18 and 19 January 1815, and moved to Saint-Denis Basilica on 20 January. Marie Antoinette's remains were identified by a garter and a jaw, which an eyewitness identified as being the queen's, based on having seen her smile over thirty years before. Louis XVIII also searched for the remains of his sister Élisabeth in the Errancis Cemetery, but to no avail.

In 1844, the first Madeleine cemetery, located 1 and 2 rue de la Ville-l'Évêque, was cleared and the skeletal remains were transferred to the l'Ossuaire de l'Ouest (West Ossuary). When the ossuary was closed, the contents were transferred to the Paris catacombs, which was also the resting place of remains removed from the Errancis Cemetery.

== During the French Revolution ==
Those killed in the September Massacres of 1792 are alleged to be buried here:

- Marie Thérèse Louise of Savoy, Princesse de Lamballe

The decapitated corpses of the guillotine victims were thrown in specially dug trenches and covered in quicklime to speed up the decomposition process. There were no markers.

Among those reputed to have been buried here:

- Louis XVI (21 January 1793); he and Marie Antoinette were reputedly the only victims buried in a coffin.
- Marie Antoinette (16 October 1793)
- Charlotte Corday (18 July 1793)
- 22 Girondists (31 October 1793); among them Jacques Pierre Brissot and Pierre Victurnien Vergniaud.
- Olympe de Gouges ( 3 November 1793)
- Louis Philippe II, Duke of Orléans (6 November 1793); also known as Philippe-Égalité.
- Madame Roland (8 November 1793)
- Madame du Barry (8 December 1793)
- Jacques Hébert (24 March 1794) and his supporters.

It is unclear how many corpses were buried: the estimates vary from hundreds up to three thousand.

== Location ==
The cemetery was located on the intersection of rue d’Anjou and the Grand Égout (now Boulevard Haussmann) in Paris. It was part of the land on which the Chapelle expiatoire, built in the memory of Louis XVI and Marie Antoinette, now stands.
