= Chapelle expiatoire =

Church in 8th arrondissement of Paris, France

- Chapelle expiatoire
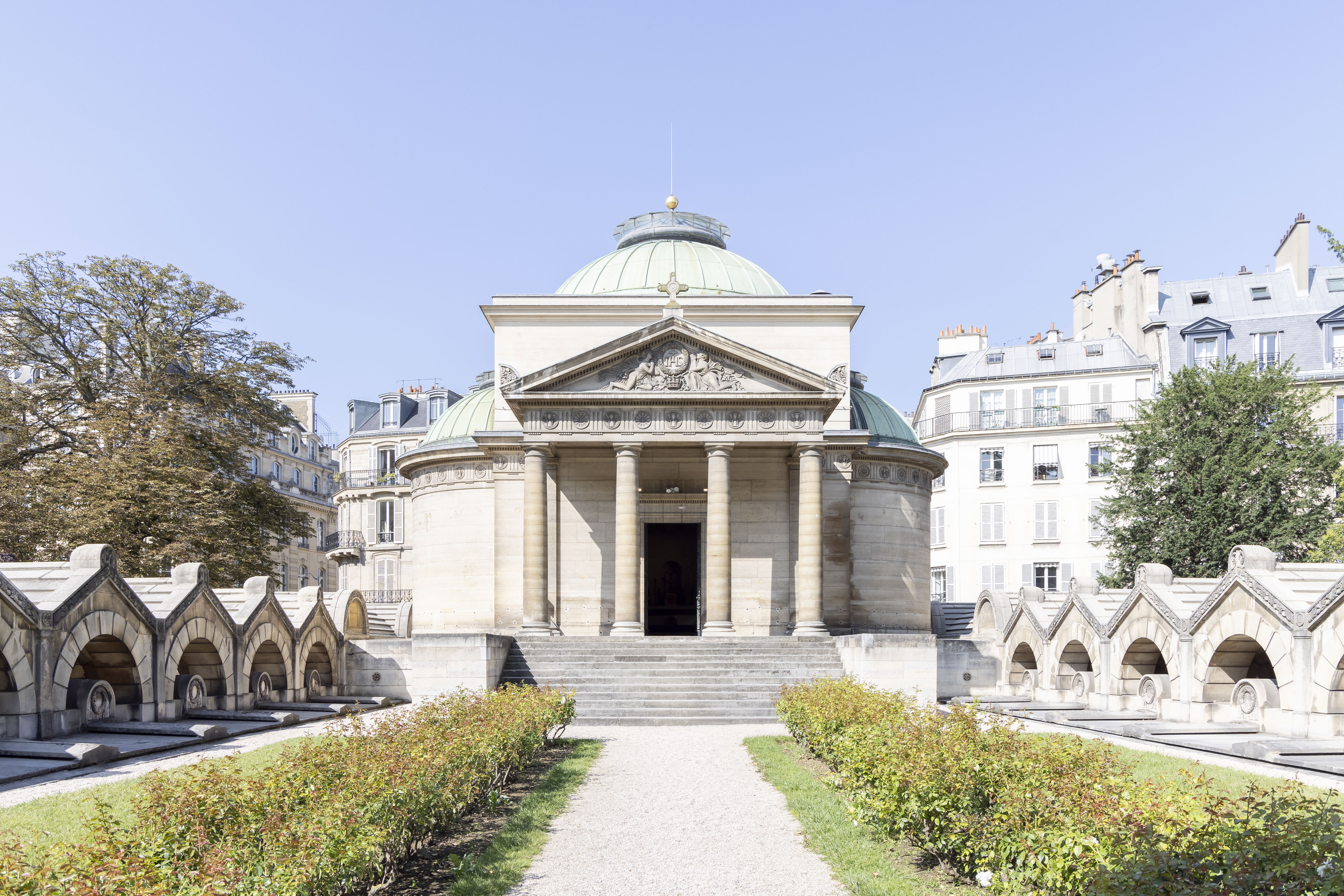
- The Chapelle expiatoire in 2024

- Location in Paris
- 48°52′25.5″N 2°19′22.9″E
- Location: 29 Rue Pasquier, 8th arrondissement of Paris, Paris
- Country: France
- Denomination: Roman Catholic
- Website: Official website

History
- Former name: Chapelle commémorative de Louis XVI et de Marie-Antoinette
- Status: Memorial chapel
- Founded: 1816
- Founder(s): Louis XVIII and Marie Thérèse of France
- Dedication: Louis XVI and Marie Antoinette
- Consecrated: 21 January 1824

Architecture
- Functional status: Museum monument
- Architect: Pierre-François-Léonard Fontaine
- Architectural type: Chapel
- Style: Neoclassical
- Groundbreaking: 1816
- Completed: 1826
- Construction cost: 3,000,000 livres

Specifications
- Length: 168 feet (51 m)
- Width: 93.5 feet (28.5 m)

Administration
- Diocese: Archdiocese of Paris
- Parish: None

Site notes
- Governing body: Centre des monuments nationaux
- Owner: French State

Monument historique
- Designated: 22 July 1914
- Reference no.: PA00088809

The Chapelle expiatoire (French pronunciation: [ʃapɛl ɛkspjatwaʁ]; lit. 'Chapel of Expiation') is a Roman Catholic memorial chapel in the 8th arrondissement of Paris, France. Built between 1816 and 1826 on the initiative of Louis XVIII and Marie Thérèse of France, it stands on the former site of the Madeleine Cemetery, where King Louis XVI and Queen Marie Antoinette were temporarily buried following their executions in the present Place de la Concorde in 1793 during the French Revolution. The chapel was erected as an act of expiation and commemoration for the deaths of the French royal couple.

Designed by the architect Pierre-François-Léonard Fontaine in the Neoclassical style, the monument was commissioned as part of the Bourbon Restoration's effort to honor the memory of the overthrown monarchy. Although the remains of Louis XVI and Marie Antoinette were transferred to the Basilica of Saint-Denis in 1815, the chapel marks the site of their original burial site and remains one of the most important monuments associated with the Restoration.

The chapel has been protected as a Monument historique since 1914 and is today administered by the Centre des monuments nationaux as a historic monument and museum. The closest métro station is Saint-Augustin.

A commemorative mass is celebrated in the chapel every year on the Sunday closest to 21 January, the anniversary of the death of Louis XVI.

== History ==
The site of the memorial chapel was originally occupied by the Madeleine Cemetery. This cemetery was the third cemetery of the parish of La Madeleine. It opened in 1721 was a rectangular enclosure measuring approximately 45 by 19 m, surrounded by a wall about 2.65 m high.

During the French Revolution, its proximity to the Place de la Révolution, where the guillotine stood, made it one of the principal burial ground for those executed during the Reign of Terror. An estimated 500 victims were buried there between 1792 and 1794, including Louis XVI, Marie Antoinette, Charlotte Corday, Olympe de Gouges, Madame du Barry, Madame Roland, and numerous Girondins. The cemetery was closed on 24 March 1794. Following its closure, the site was declared a "bien national" and sold in 1797. In 1802, it was acquired by Olivier Desclozeaux, a royalist magistrate who had witnessed the burials of Louis XVI and Marie Antoinette and carefully preserved their burial site by transforming the former cemetery into a garden, next to his adjoining house.

Design of the garden with the original burial of Louis XVI, arranged by Desclozeaux

Plan of the former Madeleine Cemetery later incorporated into a garden by Olivier Desclozeaux. The plan shows the burial locations of Louis XVI and Marie Antoinette (4)

Following the Bourbon Restoration in 1814, Louis XVIII, brother of Louis XVI, ordered the recovery of the remains of Louis XVI and Marie Antoinette. Their location was known thanks to Desclozeaux, who had marked the graves, maintained records of the interments and prevented disturbance of the area. The remains of the royal couple were identified and exhumed on 18–19 January 1815 before their transfer to the Basilica of Saint-Denis on 21 January 1815, the traditional burial place of French monarchs. The foundation stone laid of the future monument was also laid on 21 January 1815.

In 1816, Louis XVIII commissioned the architect Pierre-François-Léonard Fontaine to construct a memorial monument on the site of the former cemetery. Fontaine, who had previously worked with Charles Percier as one of Napoleon's principal architects, designed a complex commemorative ensemble combining religious, funerary and political symbolism. His assistant Louis-Hippolyte Lebas supervised much of the construction. The chapel was financed jointly by Louis XVIII and Marie-Thérèse, Duchess of Angoulême, the surviving daughter of Louis XVI and Marie Antoinette. The project reportedly cost three million francs and was completed in 1826 during the reign of Charles X.

The expiatory character of the sanctuary reflected the royalist interpretation that the execution of Louis XVI constituted a national crime requiring atonement and formed part of a broader Restoration cult of memory that represented the king as a martyr to the Catholic faith during the Revolution.

More than a simple funerary chapel, it served as a symbolic statement about the memory of the victims of the French Revolution, the execution of the king and queen, and the legitimacy of the restored monarchy. Modern historians have consequently regarded it as one of the most politically charged monuments erected during the Restoration. Other projects included the creation of an expiatory chapel on the site of Marie Antoinette's prison cell in the Conciergerie, where the queen spent her final weeks before her execution.

=== Later history ===
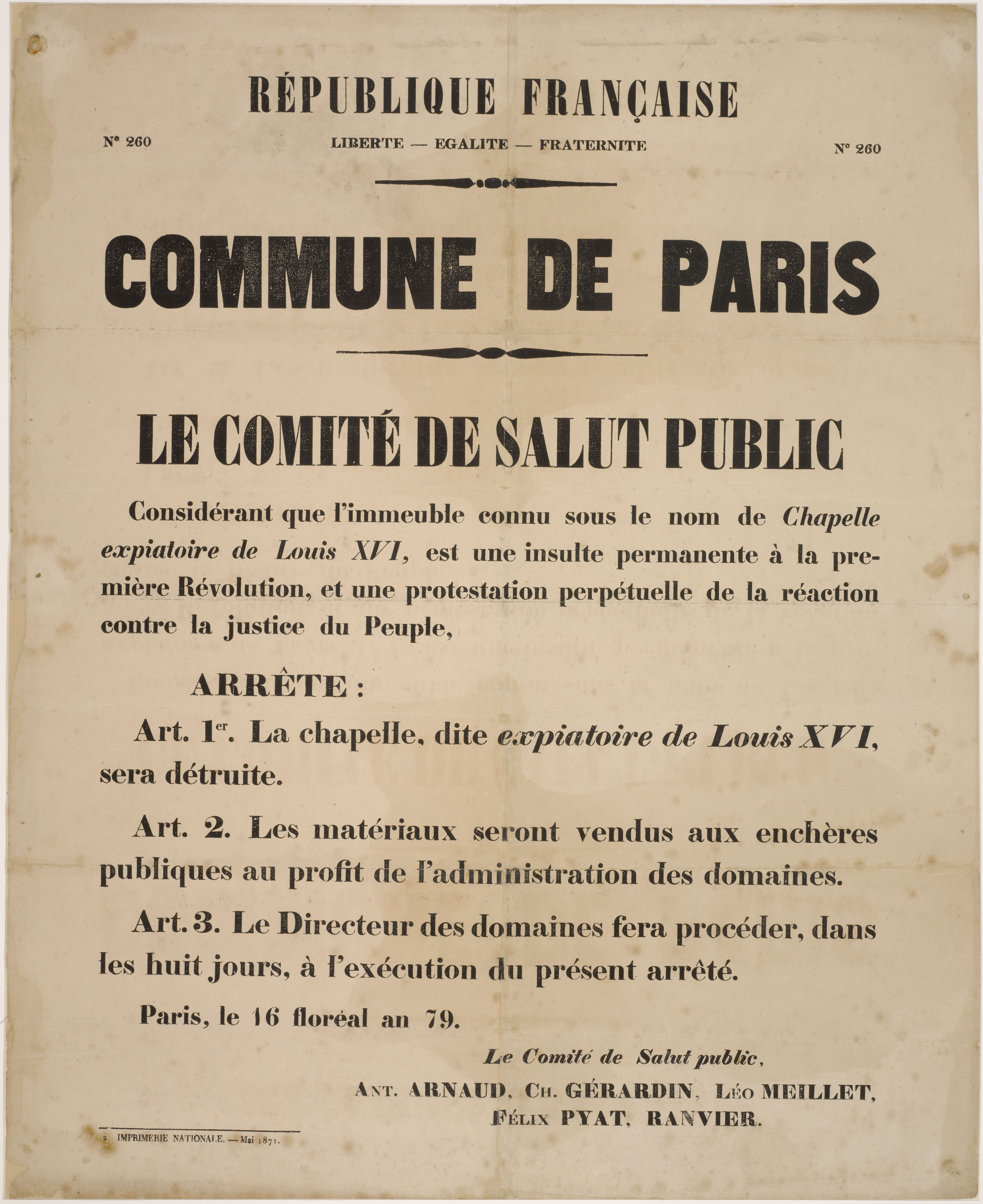
Poster from the Comité de Salut public (Committee of Public Safety) announcing the destruction of the Chapelle Expiatoire in 1871

In 1862, the cypress trees surrounding the monument were removed and the present Square Louis XVI was created around the complex. Throughout the nineteenth century the chapel was frequently criticised because of its close association with the Bourbon monarchy. Its political symbolism made it controversial under a succession of republican governments. In 1871, during the Paris Commune, proposals were advanced for its demolition, but the fall of the Commune prevented their implementation. In 1899, Jacques de Boisjoslin published two studies defending the preservation of the chapel and describing it as a threatened monument.

The chapel was formally classified as a Monument historique on 22 July 1914. During the twentieth century its artistic and architectural significance gradually came to be appreciated independently of its political associations.

In 2009 the monument suffered significant storm damage and subsequently underwent restoration. It is now administered by the Centre des monuments nationaux.

== Exterior ==
The Chapelle expiatoire is a significant example of late Neoclassical religious architecture in France. In his Mémoires d'outre-tombe, Chateaubriand described it as "perhaps the most remarkable monument in Paris". The entrance sequence to the chapel was conceived as part of the commemorative program of the monument. Visitors enter through a pavilion on Rue Pasquier before reaching an elevated enclosure known as the Campo Santo, an open quadrangular courtyard bordered by arcaded galleries, with the Chapelle expiatoire closing the perspective at its eastern end. The raised platform is built over the former Madeleine Cemetery in a composition inspired by the Camposanto Monumentale of Pisa. Fontaine may also have drawn inspiration for the Chapelle expiatoire from a small centrally planned chapel in the Villa Cesi in Rome, published in the Choix des plus célèbres maisons de plaisance de Rome et de ses environs, next to the Villa Barberini al Gianicolo in Rome.

The enclosure contains symbolic tombs commemorating the Swiss Guards who were killed during the Insurrection of 10 August 1792 while defending Louis XVI and the royal family. Their inclusion broadened the memorial purpose of the monument beyond the royal couple to include other victims associated with the fall of the monarchy.

The facade of the chapel has a classical peristyle, with Doric columns, an entablature with triglyphs and a pediment with sculpture of adoring angels.

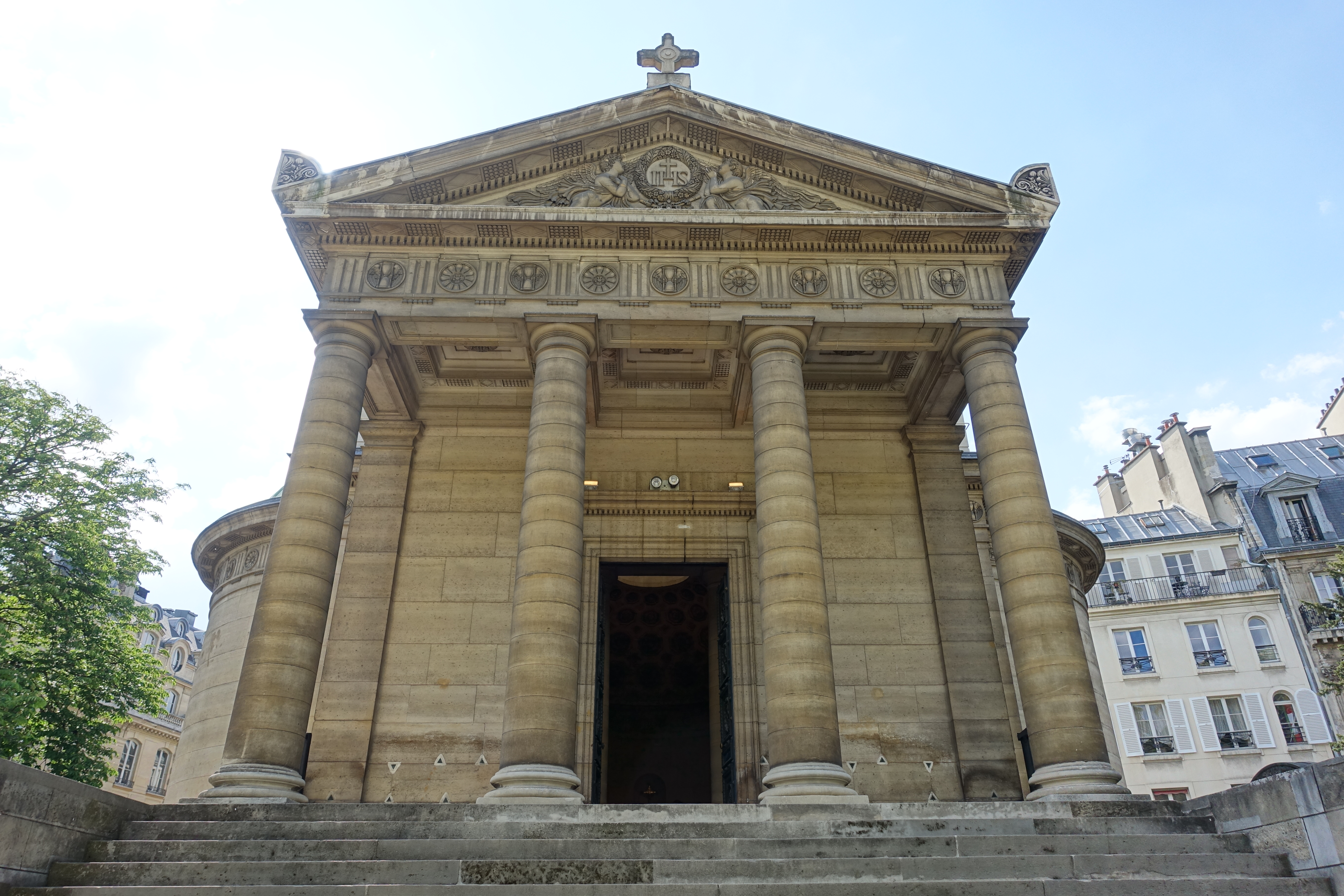
The facade of the chapel

Entrance to the campo santo on the square Louis XVI

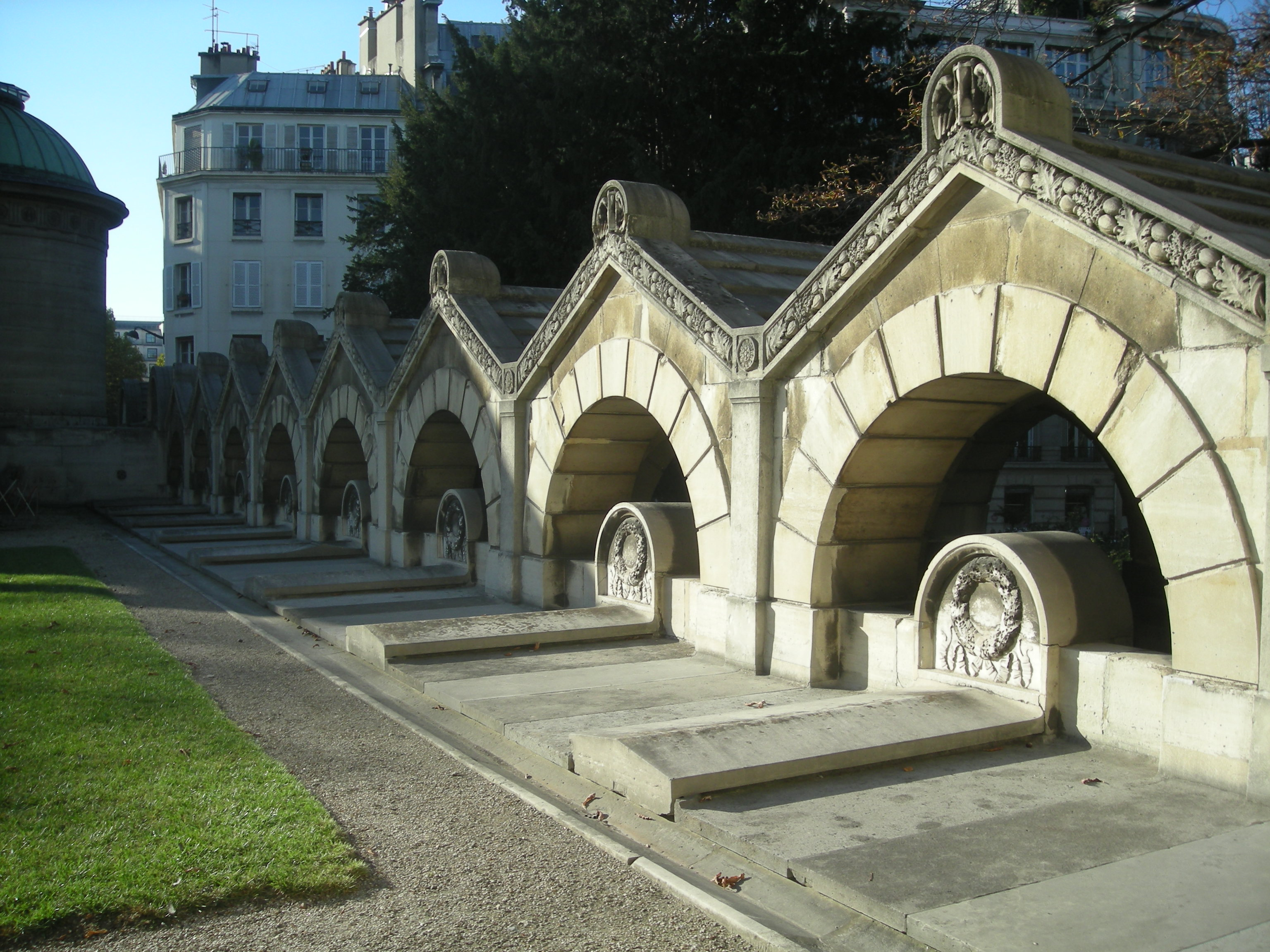
Symbolic tombs of the Swiss guards in the campo santo

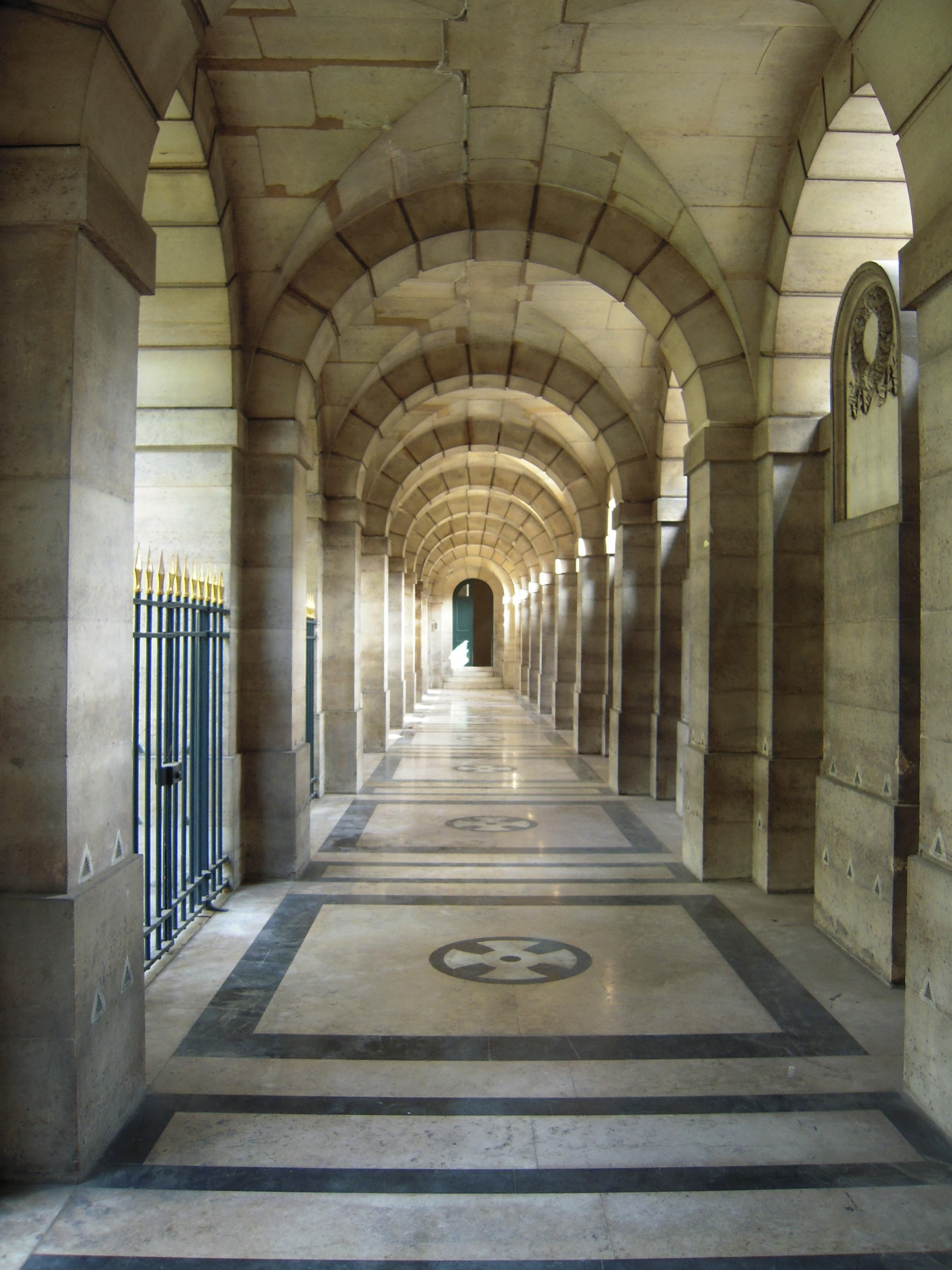
Galleries surrounding the campo santo at street level.

== Interior ==
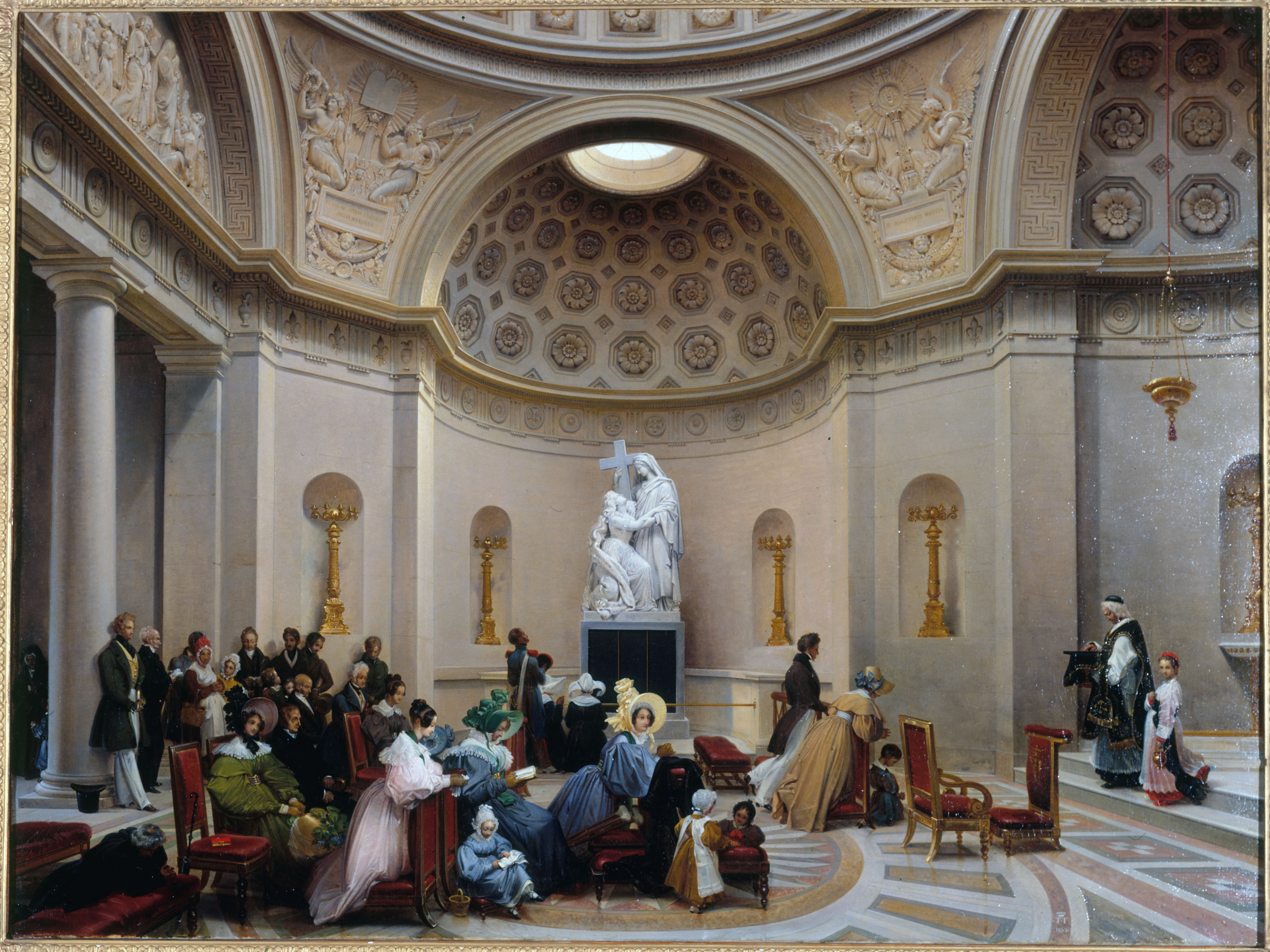
Mass in the chapel (1835), by Lancelot-Théodore Turpin de Crissé

The interior is organized around a Greek-cross plan, with a central dome and three apsidal recesses covered by coffered semi-domes. Natural light enters through openings in the central dome and the three semi-domes.

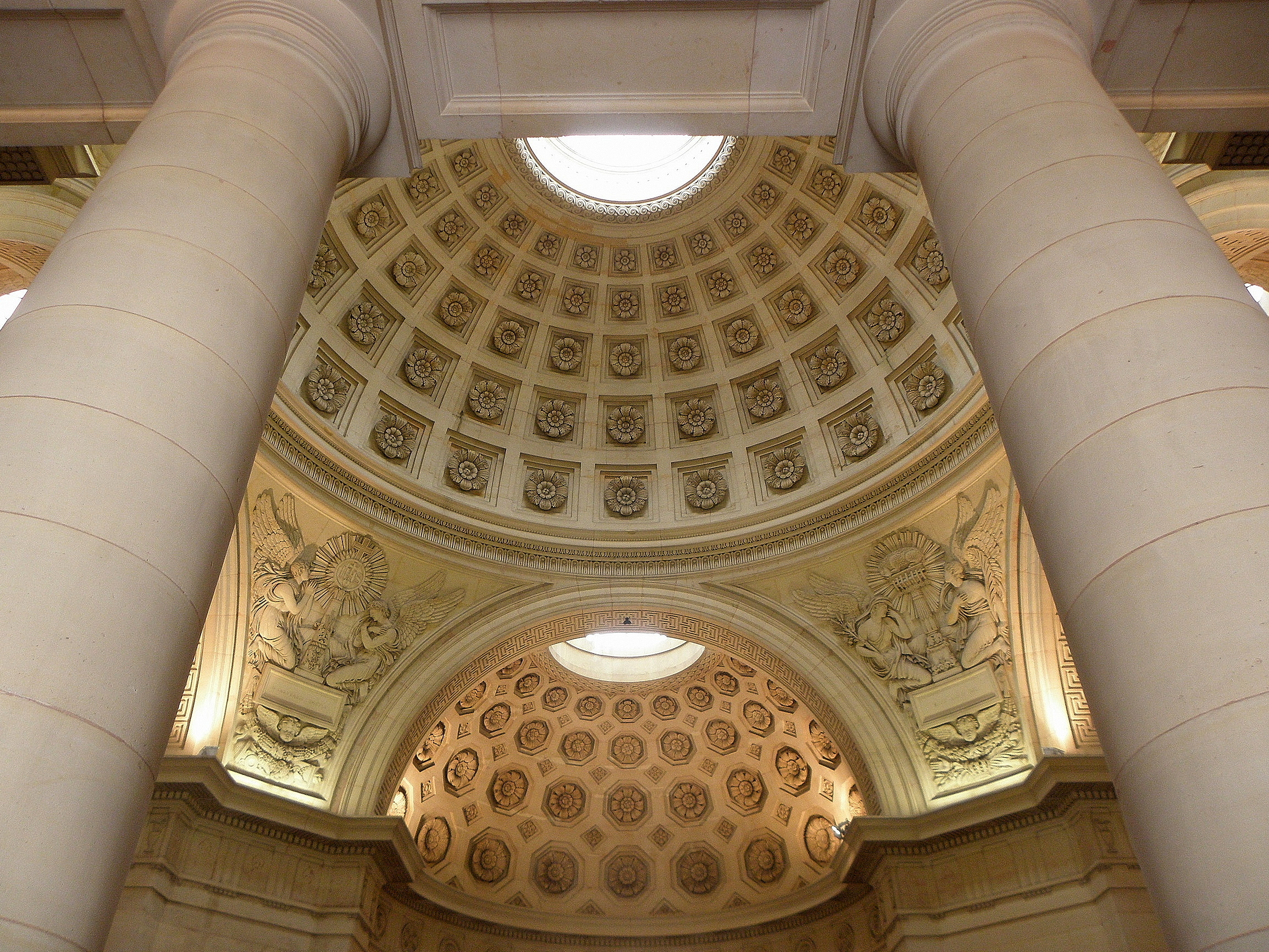
The central dome with its oculus

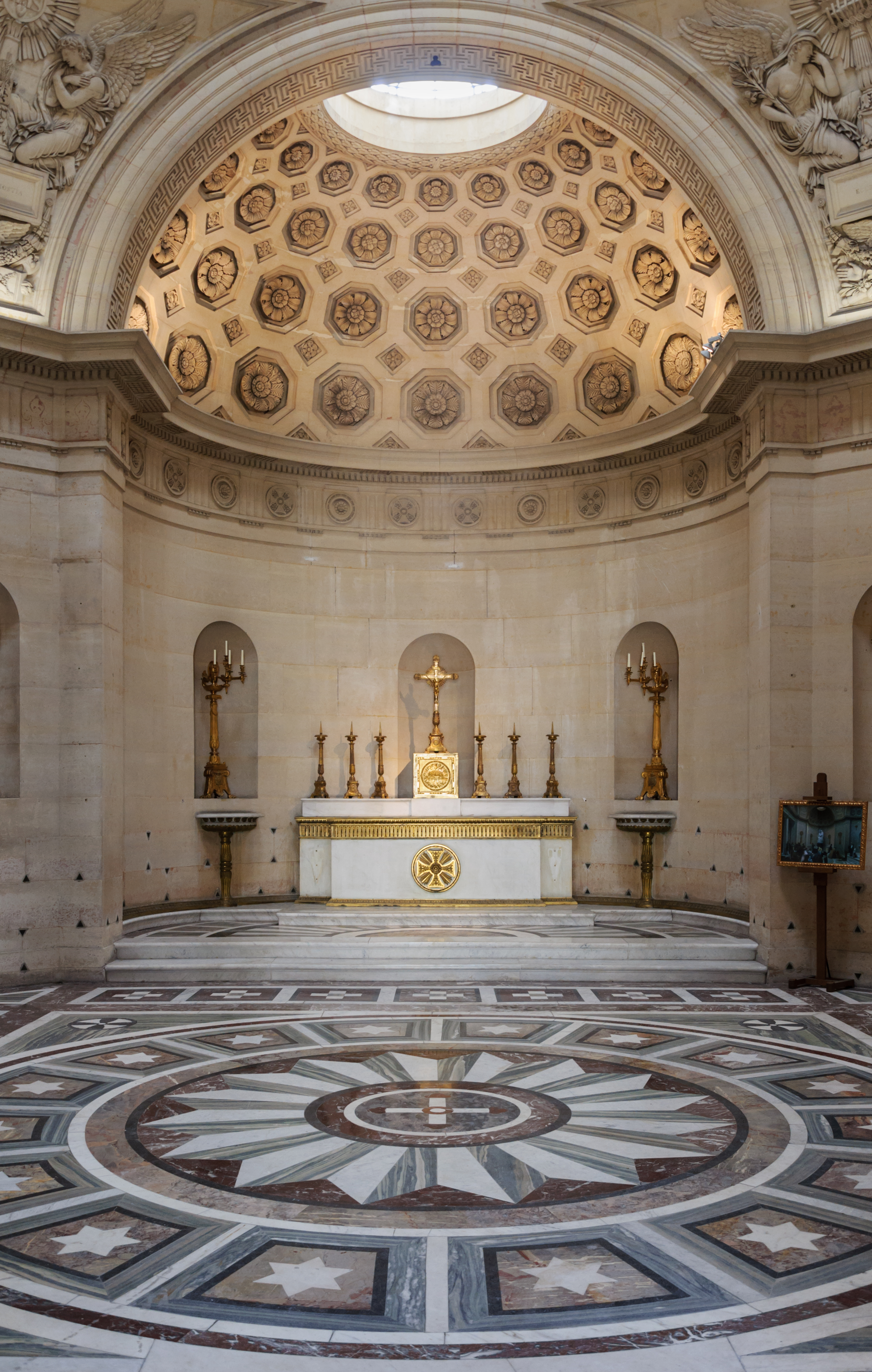
The altar

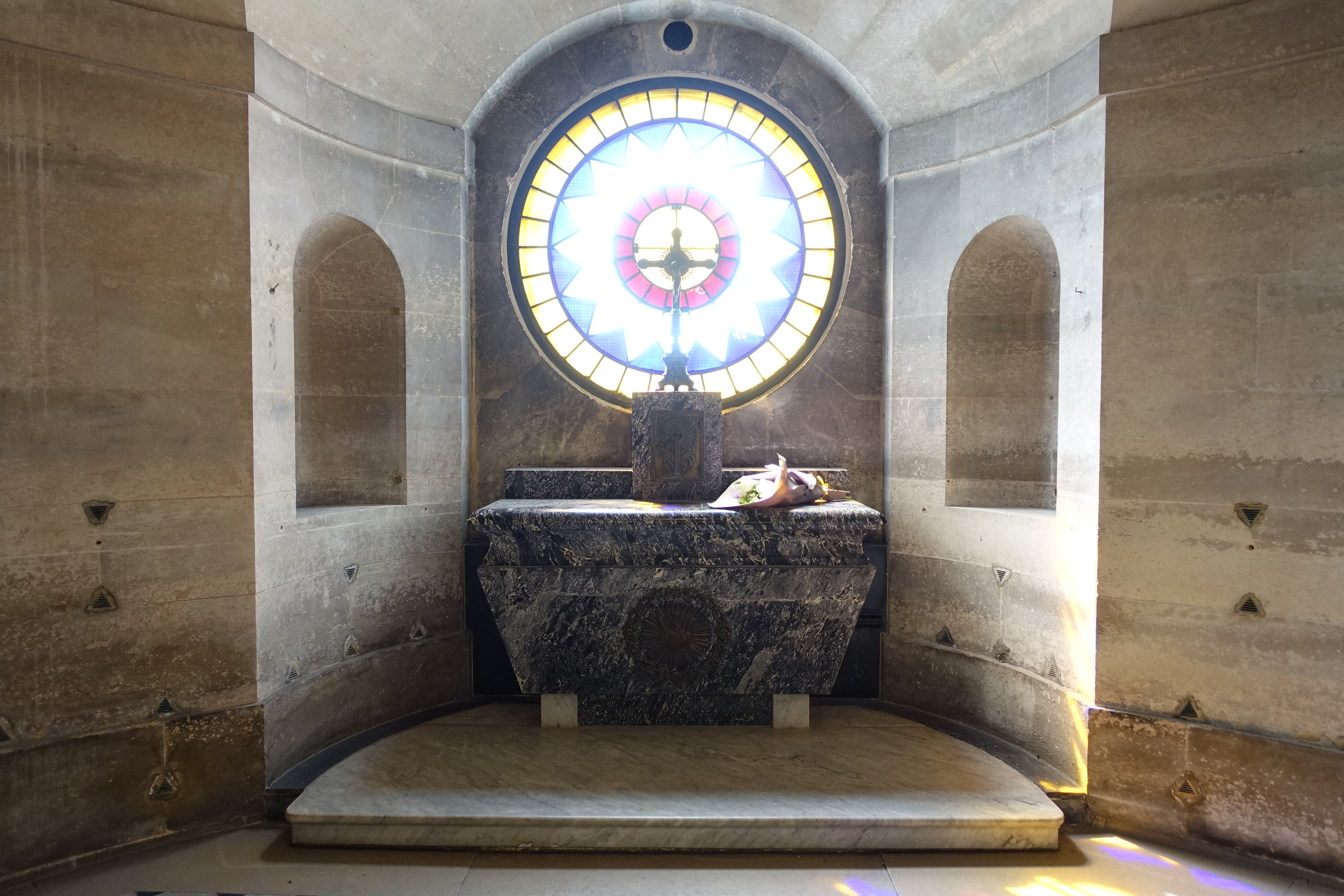
The Crypt

Two staircases at the rear of the lateral chapels lead to the crypt, also known as the lower chapel. It contains a black-and-white marble altar shaped like an ancient tomb, marking the location from which the remains of Louis XVI were exhumed in January 1815.

The crypt also contains ossuaries sealed within its walls, holding human remains recovered from the former cemetery during the chapel's construction. According to Fontaine, the bones were collected and placed in four burial vaults. Their location was subsequently forgotten until September 2018, when archaeological investigations using endoscopic cameras revealed human remains behind all four walls of the crypt.

== Art and decoration ==
The two lateral chapels house marble sculptures of Louis XVI and Marie Antoinette, while the third recess, opposite the entrance, contains the main altar. The white marble sculptures depicting Louis XVI and Marie Antoinette are works by François Joseph Bosio and Jean-Pierre Cortot, respectively. Bosio depicts the king supported by an angel, while Cortot depicts the queen kneeling before a personification of Religion.

"Louis XVI, called to immortality, supported by an angel" by Francois-Joseph Bosio

"Marie Antoinette supported by Religion", by Jean-Pierre Cortot

The central dome rests on four pendentives supporting the main dome are decorated with angels sculpted by François-Antoine Gérard (1760–1843). Each pendentive is decorated with a bas-relief by François-Antoine Gérard (1760–1843), depicting pairs of angels surrounding four religious symbols represeting respectively the Holy Trinity, the Ten Commandments, the Eucharist, and the Passion of Christ. Donated by the Duchess of Angoulême, these sculptures were installed in 1834–1835, after the fall of the Bourbon dynasty in 1830. The commemoration of Louis XVI and Marie Antoinette was no longer considered a national obligation and became a private matter.

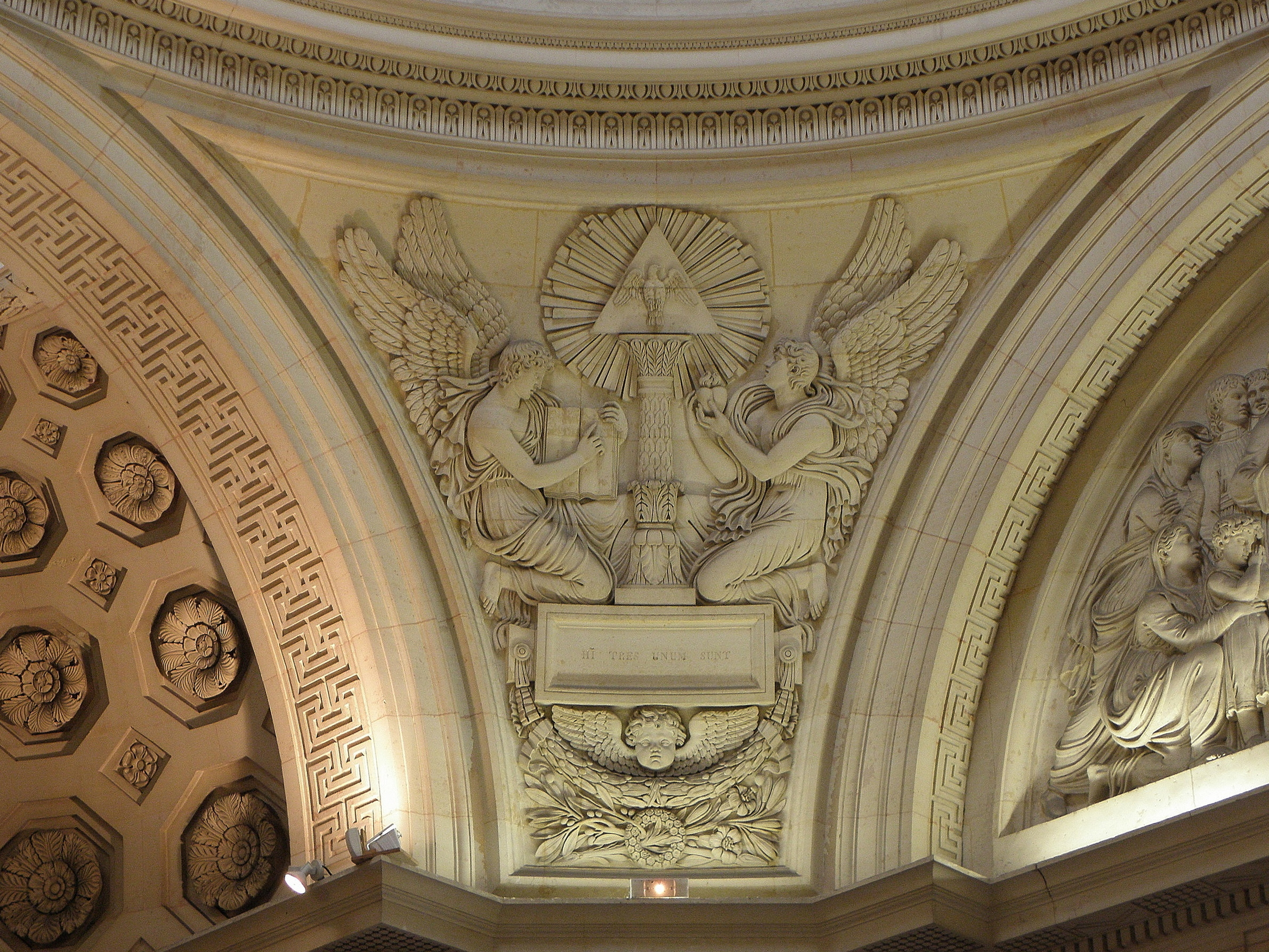
The Holy Trinity
Hi tres unum sunt,
(These Three are One)

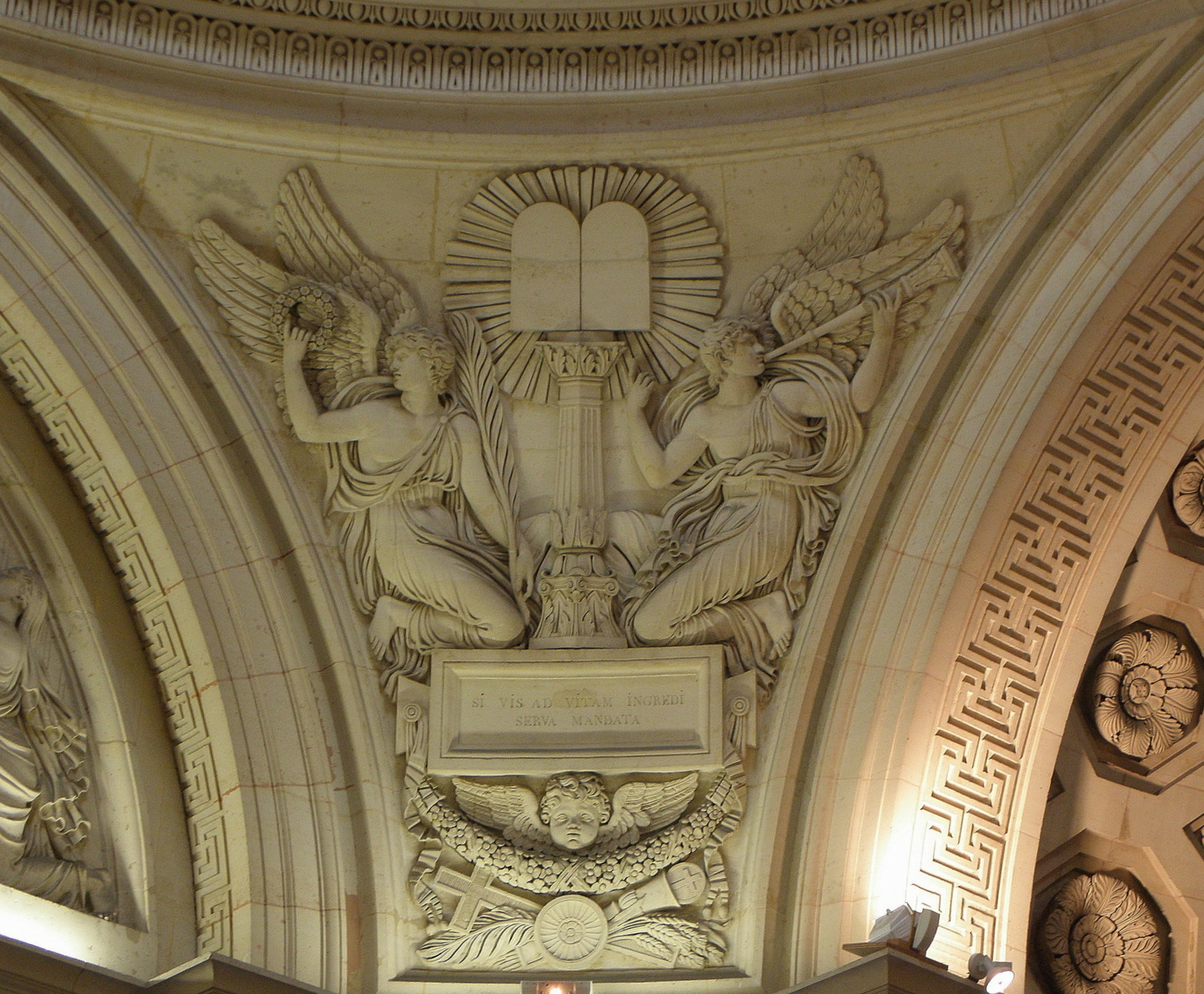
The Ten Commandments
Si vis ad vitam ingredi serva mandata,
(If you want to enter into life keep the commandments)

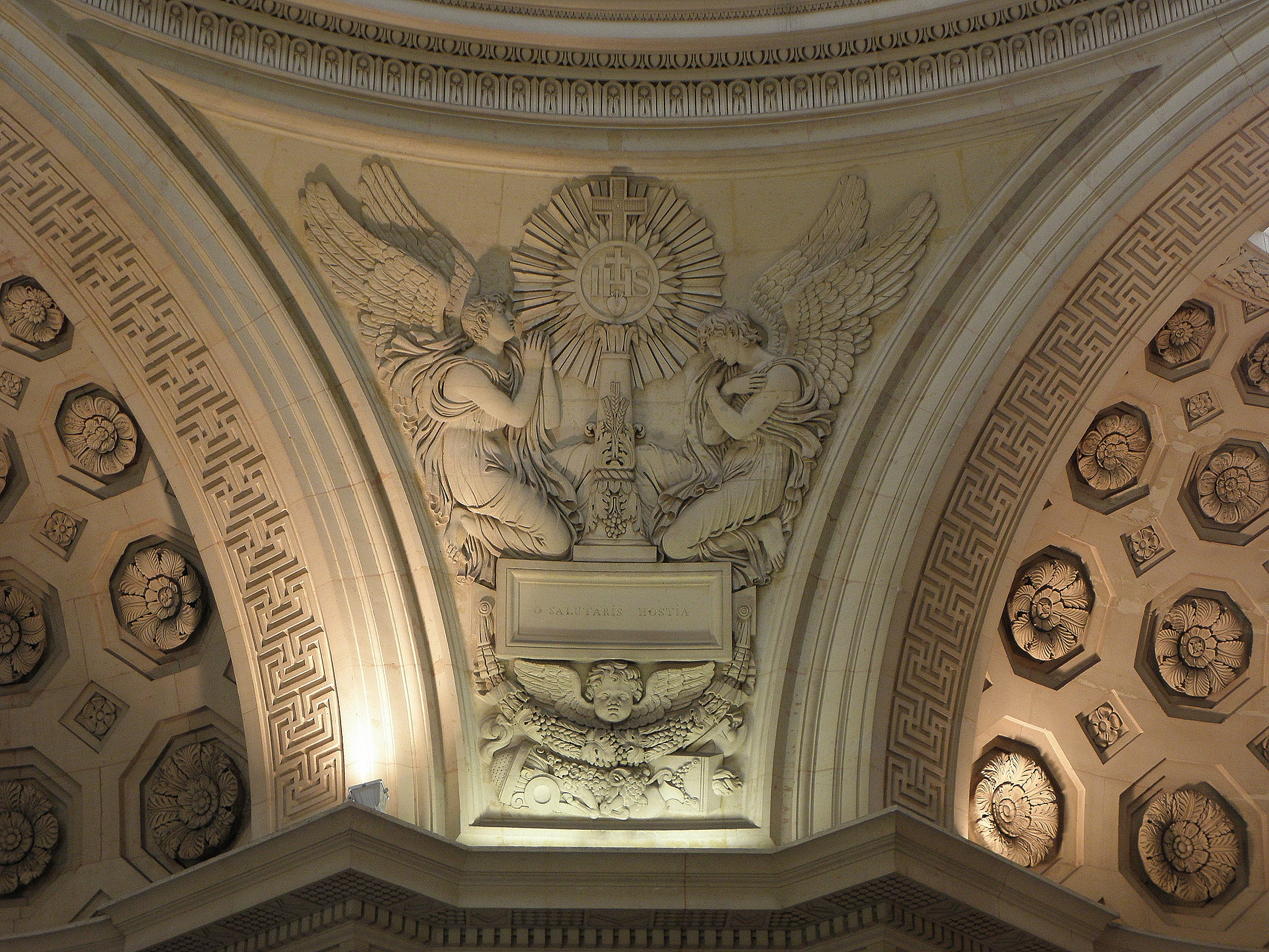
The Eucharist
O salutaris hostia,
(O saving Host)

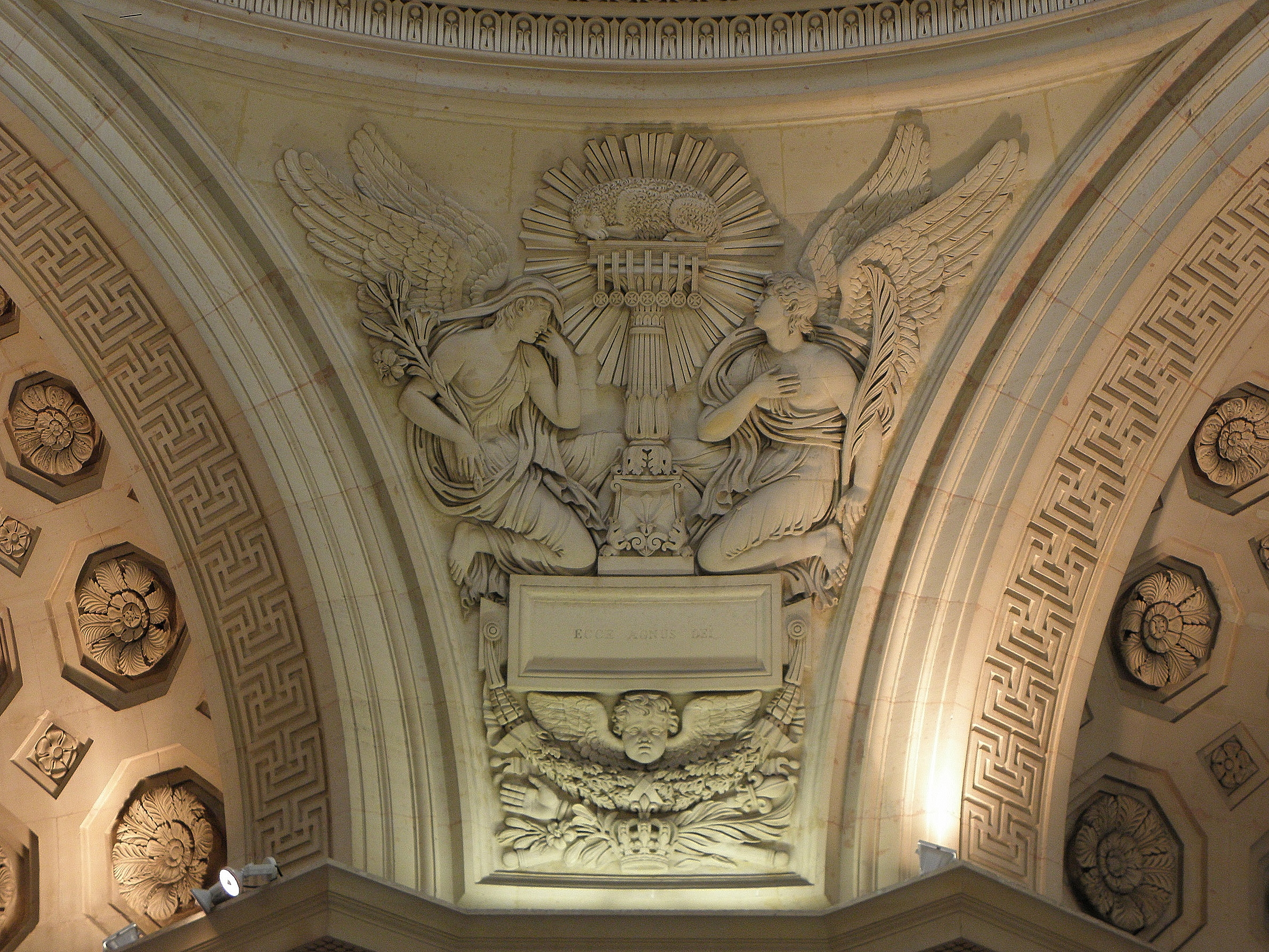
The Sacrificial Lamb
Ecce agnus dei,
(Behold the Lamb of God)

The tympanum of the large arch above the chapel entrance contains a bas-relief by French sculptor François-Antoine Gérard (1760–1843), depicting the ceremonial transfer of the remains of Louis XVI and Marie Antoinette to the Basilica of Saint-Denis.

== Bibliography ==
- Dumoulin, Aline (2012). Chapelles de Paris : de la grâce au patrimoine [Chapels of Paris: From Grace to Heritage] (in French). Paris: Massin.
- Desclozeaux, Olivier (1814). Liste des personnes qui ont péri par jugement du Tribunal révolutionnaire, depuis le 26 août 1792 jusqu'au 13 juin 1794 (25 prairial an II), et dont les corps ont été inhumés dans le terrain de l'ancien cimetière de la Madeleine [List of Persons Who Perished by Judgment of the Revolutionary Tribunal from 26 August 1792 to 13 June 1794 (25 Prairial Year II), and Whose Bodies Were Buried in the Grounds of the Former Madeleine Cemetery] (in French). Paris.
- du Bois de Beauchesne, Alcide-Hyacinthe (1869). La Vie de Madame Élisabeth, sœur de Louis XVI [The Life of Madame Élisabeth, Sister of Louis XVI] (in French). Vol. 2. Paris: Plon.
- The History of Paris: From the Earliest Period to the Present Day; Containing a Description of Its Antiquities, Public Buildings, Civil, Religious, Scientific and Commercial Institutions. Paris: A. and W. Galignani. 1825.
- Petridou, Vassiliki (2000). "P.-F.-L. Fontaine et L.-H. Lebas : une double paternité pour la Chapelle Expiatoire à la mémoire de Louis XVI et de Marie-Antoinette" [P.-F.-L. Fontaine and L.-H. Lebas: A Dual Authorship for the Chapel of Expiation in Memory of Louis XVI and Marie-Antoinette]. In Kleindienst, Thérèse (ed.). Le Livre et l'art : études offertes en hommage à Pierre Lelièvre (in French). Paris.
- Chateaubriand, François-René de (1910). Mémoires d'outre-tombe (in French). Vol. 3. Paris: Garnier.
- Garric, Jean-Philippe (2022). La Chapelle expiatoire [The Chapel of Expiation]. Itinéraires (in French). Paris: Éditions du patrimoine, Centre des monuments nationaux. ISBN 9782757708187.
- Garric, Jean-Philippe (2010). "Comprendre la Renaissance dans un processus de projet : le Choix des plus célèbres maisons de plaisance de Rome et de ses environs de Percier et Fontaine" [Understanding the Renaissance in a Design Process: Percier and Fontaine's Selection of the Most Celebrated Pleasure Houses of Rome and Its Surroundings]. In Lemerle, Frédérique; Pauwels, Yves; Thomine, Alice (eds.). Le XIXe siècle et l'architecture de la Renaissance [The Nineteenth Century and Renaissance Architecture] (in French). Paris: Picard. pp. 81–93.
- Boisjoslin, Jacques de (1899a). "La chapelle expiatoire" [The Chapel of Expiation]. Bulletin de la Société Historique des VIIIe et XVIIe arrondissements de Paris (in French). 1: 103–114.
- Boisjoslin, Jacques de (1899b). "Monuments menacés. La chapelle expiatoire" [Threatened Monuments: The Chapel of Expiation]. Revue de l'Art Ancien et Moderne (in French). 6: 149–162.
- Boisjoslin, Jacques de (1 July 1900). "La chapelle expiatoire". Bulletin de la Société historique et archéologique du VIIIe arrondissement de Paris (in French). 2: 121–131.
- Butenschön, Anja (2011). "Remembering the Past in Restoration France: An Expiatory Chapel for Marie-Antoinette". Nineteenth-Century Art Worldwide. 10 (3).
- Monuments Nationaux. "Histoire de la Chapelle expiatoire" [History of the Chapel of Expiation]. Chapelle expiatoire (in French). Centre des monuments nationaux.
- Monuments Nationaux. "Architecture de la chapelle" [Architecture of the Chapel] (PDF). Chapelle expiatoire (in French). Centre des monuments nationaux.
- Monument Nationaux. "La redécouverte des ossuaires" [The Rediscovery of the Ossuaries]. Chapelle expiatoire (in French). Centre des monuments nationaux.
- Monuments Nationaux. "Le Campo Santo, jardin intérieur de la Chapelle expiatoire" [The Campo Santo, Interior Garden of the Chapel of Expiation]. Chapelle expiatoire (in French). Centre des monuments nationaux.
- Percier, Charles; Fontaine, Pierre-François-Léonard (1809). Choix des plus célèbres maisons de plaisance de Rome et de ses environs [Selection of the Most Celebrated Pleasure Houses of Rome and its Environs] (in French). Paris: Didot l'aîné.
- Hours, Bernard (2006). "Le « martyre » de Louis XVI. Les mythographies royales d'Ancien Régime comme matrices d'une revendication" [The "Martyrdom" of Louis XVI: Royal Mythographies of the Ancien Régime as the Foundations of a Claim]. Le sang des princes [The Blood of Princes] (in French). Rennes: Presses universitaires de Rennes. pp. 105–114.
- Chopelin, Paul (2006). "Un régicide contre Dieu ? Les tentatives de béatification de Louis XVI après le refus romain de 1820" [A Regicide Against God? Attempts to Beatify Louis XVI After the Roman Refusal of 1820]. Le sang des princes [The Blood of Princes] (in French). Rennes: Presses universitaires de Rennes. pp. 281–295.
- Petitfils, Jean-Christian (2015). "Post mortem" [After Death] (PDF). Louis XVI (in French) (Revised and updated ed.). Paris: Perrin. pp. 952–976. ISBN 978-2-262-06404-4. Archived (PDF) from the original on 2026-11-01.
