= Pierre Gaspard Chaumette =

18th-century French politician

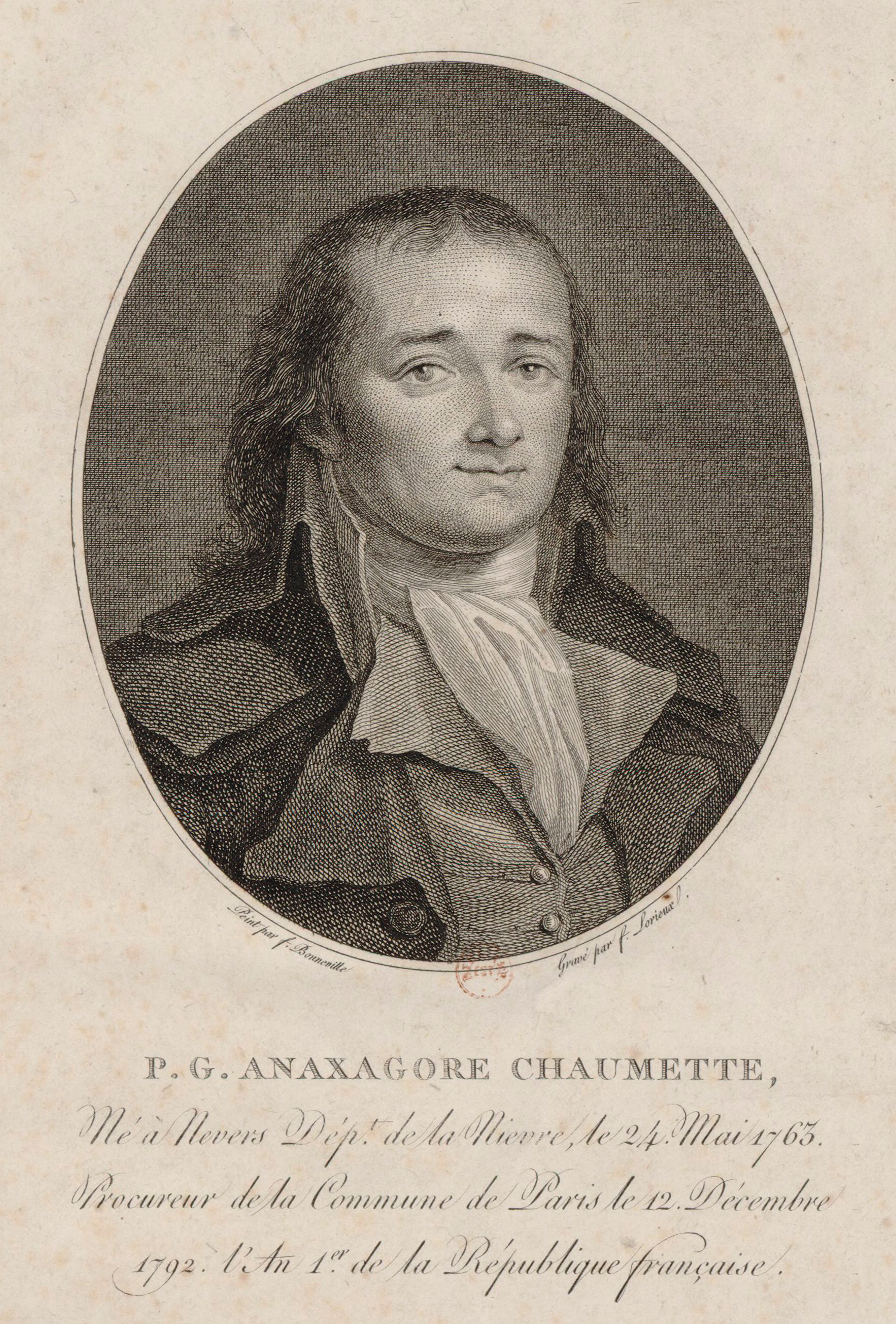
- Pierre Gaspard Anaxagore Chaumette
- Born: 24 May 1763; Nevers
- Died: 13 April 1794 (aged 30); Paris
- Education: University of Paris
- Scientific career
- Fields: Botany; Politics

Pierre Gaspard Anaxagore Chaumette (French: [pjɛʁ ɡaspaʁ anaksaɡɔʁ ʃomɛt]; 24 May 1763 – 13 April 1794) was a French politician of the Revolutionary period who served as the president of the Paris Commune and played a leading role in the establishment of the Reign of Terror. He was a leader of the radical Hébertistes of the revolution, an ardent critic of Christianity who was one of the leaders of the dechristianization of France. His radical positions resulted in his alienation from Maximilien Robespierre, and he was arrested and executed.

== Biography ==
=== Early life and career ===
Chaumette was born in Nevers, France, on 24 May 1763 into a family of shoemakers who wanted him to enter the Church. However, he did not have a vocation and instead sought his fortune as a cabin boy. After only reaching the rank of helmsman, he returned to Nevers to study his main interests, botany and science. He also studied surgery and made a long voyage in the company of an English doctor, serving as his secretary. He then became surgeon at the Frères de la charité in Moulins. Chaumette studied medicine at the University of Paris in 1790, but gave up his career in medicine at the start of the Revolution. Chaumette began his political career as member of the Jacobin Club editing the progressive Revolutions de Paris journal from 1790. His oratory skills proved him a valuable spokesperson of the Cordelier Club, and more importantly, the sans-culotte movement in the Paris sections.

=== Presidency of the Commune ===
In August 1792, Chaumette became the Chief Procurator of the Commune of Paris. As member of the Commune during the insurrection of 10 August 1792, he was delegated to visit the prisons, with full power to arrest suspects. On 31 October 1792, he was elected President of the Commune and was re-elected in the Municipal on 2 December of that same year.

His conduct, oratorical talent, and the fact that his private life was considered beyond reproach, all made him influential, and he was elected president of the Commune, defending the municipality at the bar of the National Convention on 31 October 1792. Re-elected in the municipal elections of 2 December 1792, he was soon given the functions of procureur of the Commune, and contributed with success to the enrollments of volunteers in the army by his appeals to the population of Paris. Chaumette held strong anti-monarchy views. He led a deputation from the Commune and argued before the National Convention that failing to punish Louis XVI for his crimes was causing high prices and the fall of the assignat. Further, Chaumette held a strong opinion about the fate of Louis XVI after his fall. He was greatly outspoken in his demand for the king's blood. Chaumette's thesis was that as long as Louis XVI went unpunished prices would remain high, and shortages and the profiteering that created them, which he assumed to be the work of the royalists, would go unchecked.

Chaumette was also a leading and vocal opponent of the Girondins. He was one of the instigators of their downfall in mid-1793. Chaumette and Jacques Hébert acted as prosecutors on behalf of the Tribunal which tried the Girondists in October 1793.

Chaumette made a leading contribution to establishing the Reign of Terror. In early September 1793 there was fear and unrest in Paris over prices, food shortages, war and fears of a royalist betrayal. On 4 September Hebert appealed to the sections to join the Commune in petitioning the National Convention with radical demands. The next day, led by Chaumette and the mayor of Paris, Pache, crowds of citizens filled the Convention. Chaumette stood up on a table to declare that "we now have open war between the rich and the poor" and urged the immediate mobilisation of the revolutionary army to go into the countryside, seize food supplies from hoarders and exact punishments on them. Robespierre was presiding over the Convention's sessions that day, and Chaumette's demands, together with the shock of the recent betrayal of Toulon to the British, prompted the Convention to decree that 'Terror will be the order of the day'.

Despite his social radicalism in other regards, Chaumette was a virulent opponent of women's participation in the Revolution. He believed women had to remain excluded from all involvement in public life, instead devoting themselves to the household. During a November 1793 meeting of the Commune, he harshly chastized a group of female attendees: "Since when is it permitted to renounce one's sex? (...) Is it for women to make motions? Is it for women to put themselves at the head of our armies?" He further cautioned the women by reminding them of the recently executed Madame Roland and Olympe de Gouges, describing such politically active women as "haughty", "denatured" and "shameless".

=== Role in the dechristianization of France ===
Chaumette is considered one of the ultra-radical enragés of the French Revolution. He demanded the formation of a Revolutionary Army which was to "force avarice and greed to yield up the riches of the earth" in order to redistribute wealth, and feed troops and the urban populations. However, he is much more known today for his role in the dechristianization movement. Chaumette was an ardent critic of Christianity, which he considered "ridiculous ideas" that "have been very helpful to [legitimize] despotism." His views were heavily influenced by atheist and materialist writers Paul d'Holbach, Denis Diderot and Jean Meslier. Chaumette saw religion as a relic of superstitious eras that did not reflect the intellectual achievements of the Age of Enlightenment. Indeed, for Chaumette, "church and counterrevolution were one and the same." Thus, he proceeded to pressure several priests and bishops into abjuring their positions.

Chaumette organized a Festival of Reason on 10 November 1793, which boasted a Goddess of Reason, portrayed by an actress, on an elevated platform in the Notre Dame Cathedral. He was such a passionate opponent of Christianity that in December 1792, he even publicly changed his name from Pierre-Gaspard Chaumette to Anaxagoras Chaumette, explaining: "I was formerly called Pierre-Gaspard Chaumette because my god-father believed in the saints. Since the revolution I have taken the name of a saint who was hanged for his republican principles." It has been suggested by Daniel Guérin that his criticism was also influenced by the Church's stance on homosexual relations.

=== Downfall ===
Chaumette's ultra-radical ideas on the economy, society and religion set him at odds with Maximilien Robespierre, the powerful circle around him and other "moderate" Montagnards. Soon, official opinion began to turn against Chaumette and the like-minded Hébertists. In September 1793, Robespierre, who was a Deist, made a speech denouncing dechristianisation as aristocratic and immoral. Fabre d'Églantine, himself under suspicion, produced a report for the Committee of Public Safety, alleging Chaumette's involvement in an anti-government plot, revealed by Chabot, although Chabot had never named Chaumette himself.

In the early spring of 1794, Chaumette increasingly became target of allegations that he was a counterrevolutionary. Hébert and his associates planned an armed uprising to overthrow Robespierre, but Chaumette, along with fellow sans-culotte leader François Hanriot, refused to take part. When the Hébertists were arrested on 4 March, Chaumette was originally spared, but on 13 March he too was arrested. The other Hébertists were executed with their leader Jacques Hébert on 24 March 1794, but Chaumette was held in prison until found guilty of taking part in the prison plot at Luxembourg Palace. He was sentenced to death on the morning of 13 April and guillotined that same afternoon. Also executed was his unlikely group of co-conspirators including Lucile Desmoulins, wife of the recently executed Camille Desmoulins, Françoise Hebert, wife of the recently executed Hébert, Gobel, former Bishop of Paris, Arthur Dillon and an assortment of other prisoners of various types.

Pierre-Gaspard Chaumette's legacy mainly consists of his ultra-radical philosophies that were regarded as excessive even by his colleagues.

== Religious philosophy ==
In 1790 Chaumette reviewed the work of Louis Claude de Saint-Martin, a French Catholic philosopher wishing for a theocratic society in which the most devout people would guide the rest of the population. The review provides a substantiated outline of Chaumette's philosophies. He criticizes Saint-Martin's ideal due to its similarity to France's feudal order before the Revolution in which the rule of the monarch was legitimized by the divine right of kings. The review soon develops into a much broader attack on religion. Chaumette calls all Christians "enemies of reason", and their ideas "ridiculous." He wonders "over whom to get more embarrassed; him who believes he can deceive humans in the eighteenth century with such farces or him who has the weakness to let himself be deceived."

The review also criticizes the very notion of free will as a construct that authorizes Christianity to proscribe "unmoral" actions. Chaumette emphasizes a greater reliance on our instincts and a greater embracing of the apparent world, instead of Christianity's concern with the afterlife. In his philosophy, he is rather critical of human beings stating that "everyone knows that humans are nothing more than what education makes of them; [...and thus] if one wants them just, one must furnish them with notions of fairness, not ideas from seventh heaven [...] because the sources of all of human's grief are ignorance and superstition."
