= Marie Marguerite Françoise Hébert =

French wife of revolutionary leader

- Born: Marie Goupil; 1756; Paris, France
- Died: 13 April 1794 (aged 37–38); Paris, France
- Burial place: Errancis Cemetery
- Occupation: Wife of revolutionary leader
- Known for: Execution by guillotine during the French Revolution
- Spouse: Jacques René Hébert
- Children: Scipion-Virginie Hébert

Marie Marguerite Françoise Hébert, née Marie Goupil (1756, Paris – 13 April 1794, Paris), was a figure in the French Revolution who died by guillotine during the Reign of Terror.

== Biography ==
Marie Goupil was born in Paris to Jacques Goupil, a lingerie merchant who died prematurely, and Louise Morel (who died in 1781).

She became a nun in the Convent of the Conception (on rue Saint-Honoré) in Paris as a "Sister of Providence." but she left the convent after the suppression of monastic vows. Choosing to pursue new ideas, she became a member of the Fraternal Society of Both Sexes, which was an early example of women actively participating in politics. At one of the group's meetings, she met the prominent revolutionary Jacques René Hébert and they married on 7 February 1792.

The couple had a daughter Scipion-Virginie Hébert (7 February 1793 – 13 July 1830), but the infant was orphaned when her father was guillotined on 24 March 1794, and her mother Marie was guillotined on 13 April 1794, only twenty days later along with Lucile Desmoulins, Chaumette and Gobel, and others. The bodies of Marie Hébert, as well as the others guillotined that day, were disposed of in Errancis Cemetery.

Scipion-Virginie Hébert was raised by a printer, Jacques Christophe Marquet. She became undermistress of a boarding school and married a Reformed pastor and had six children. She died at 37 years of age.
