= Paris Commune (1789–1795) =

Parisian government during the French Revolution

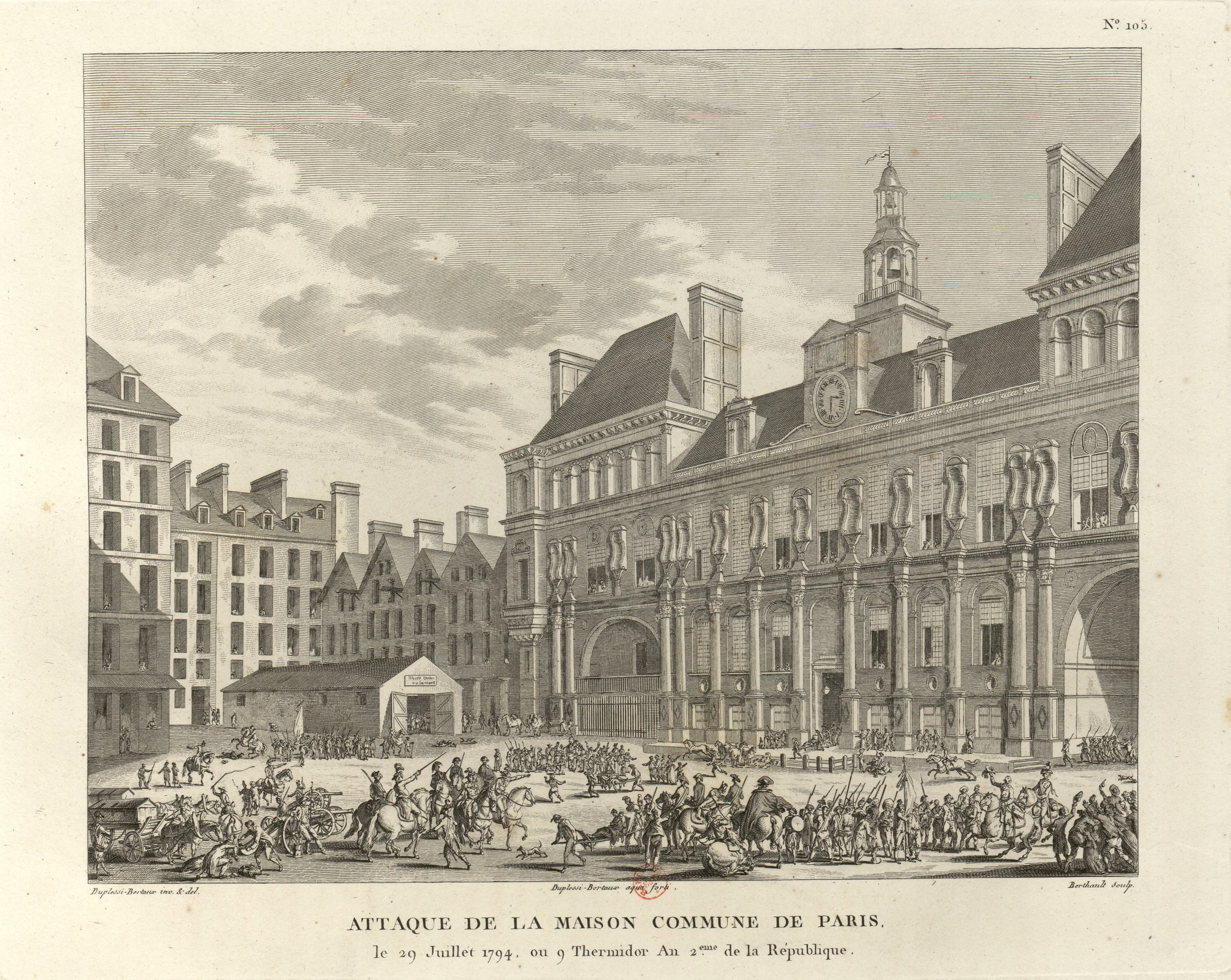
Hôtel de Ville, Paris, on 9 Thermidor

The Paris Commune (French: Commune de Paris) during the French Revolution was the government of Paris from 1789 until 1795. Established in the Hôtel de Ville just after the storming of the Bastille, it consisted of 144 delegates elected by the 60 divisions of the city. Before its formal establishment, there had been much popular discontent on the streets of Paris over who represented the true Commune, and who had the right to rule the Parisian people. The first mayor was Jean Sylvain Bailly, a relatively moderate Feuillant who supported constitutional monarchy. He was succeeded in November 1791 by Pétion de Villeneuve after Bailly's unpopular use of the National Guard to disperse a riotous assembly in the Champ de Mars (17 July 1791).

By 1792, the Commune was dominated by the Jacobins who were not in the Legislative Assembly due to the Self-Denying Ordinance. The new Commune meant that there was a revolutionary challenge to the Legislative Assembly, though its practical victories were limited and temporary. The violence provoked by the Jacobins and their excesses meant that the power of the Commune would end up being limited by increasing support for more moderate revolutionary forces until the Thermidorian Reaction and the execution of its leaders including Robespierre after his overthrow in July 1794 had led to its disestablishment in 1795.

== Legislative origins and early history ==
When Louis XVI ascended to the throne, he initially sought to establish better relations with a Paris that had felt subordinated by Versailles, and in 1774 he restored the Parliament of Paris – a court of nobles that had previously been abolished. However its powers were limited, and economic pressures meant that Versailles imposed austerity measures on the military and policing structures of Paris, incentivising disloyalty to the crown amongst soldiers and the police. This coupled with the perceived frivolity of royal spending encouraged popular anger, and radical pamphleteering and meetings started to become a key part of the Parisian bourgeois intellectual culture. Amidst this anger and the wider contemporary social upheavals in France, on 25 June 1789, 12 representatives from three different parts of the city voted in favour of creating a united Parisian municipality. Further reforms proposed by Nicolas de Bonneville aimed to create a Parisian Bourgeois Guard that would later become a National Guard (and was composed of 48,000 citizens) and a Commune that would have its own assembly which named itself L'Assemblée Générale des Électeurs de la Commune de Paris and was established on 11 July, just days before the Bastille was stormed on 14 July. On 20 July, each district of Paris elected 2 representatives, creating an assembly of 120 representatives who primarily came from the Third Estate. In Spring 1790 the departments of France were reorganized; the Paris Commune was divided up in 48 revolutionary sections of Paris and allowed to discuss the election of a new mayor. Louis XVI himself gave permission for this on 21 May 1790. Each section was granted its own popular militia, civil committee, and revolutionary committee. These sections acted as intermediaries between local populations (largely sans-culottes) and the legislative Paris Commune, and initially tended to deal with legal and civil concerns, but the sections were becoming increasingly radicalised and focused on political issues and struggles. On 24 February 1792 the Conseil Général de la Commune was installed: it consisted of 24 members, under whom were Etienne Clavière, Pierre-Joseph Cambon, Sergent-Marceau, René Levasseur and the King. Manuel was appointed as procureur of the commune, representing the King, gave a speech warning against anarchy. Early March the Paris Department was placed above the Commune in all matters of general order and security. According to Jan ten Brink it had the right to suspend the Commune's decisions and to dispose of the army against her in case of emergency.

The distinctions between an active and passive citizen were abolished by the Commune on 25 July 1792 as the Commune became increasingly Jacobin in its orientation, and ideas of full citizenship were beginning to take root. The theoretical basis for the establishment of the Commune meant that administrative power could be brought closer to the people in a revolutionary manner, and Paris could achieve localisation of revolutionaries to modernise the city and country, alongside creating a rational framework or administration that could function efficiently without agents of the state.

== Insurrection on 10 August ==
In the earlier days of the Commune, Feuillants and then Girondin bourgeois Republican forces had dominated, but an ascendant Jacobin presence amongst the Parisian political class became increasingly militant in its desire to establish control of the Commune, and it succeeded in doing so formally as part of an organised seizure of power in August 1792. As a result of this, the Paris Commune became insurrectionary in the summer of 1792, essentially refusing to take orders from the Constitutional Cabinet of Louis XVI. On the night of 9 August 1792 (spurred by the issue of the Brunswick Manifesto on 25 July) a new revolutionary Commune, led by Georges Danton, Camille Desmoulins and Jacques Hébert took possession of the Hôtel de Ville. Antoine Galiot Mandat de Grancey, the commander of the Paris National Guard and in charge of defending the Tuileries where the royal family resided, was assassinated and replaced by Antoine Joseph Santerre. The next day insurgents assailed the Tuileries. During the ensuing constitutional crisis, the collapsing Legislative Assembly of France was heavily dependent on the Commune for the effective power that allowed it to continue to function as a legislature. The insurrectionary commune had elected Sulpice Huguenin during the night as its first president.

On 10 August and the following days, all 48 districts of Paris decided to elect representatives with unlimited powers (28 districts jointly made this decision on the eve of the assault on the Tuileries, whilst the remaining 20 joined them over the days that followed). The 11th district, covering an area which included Place Vendôme, elected Maximilien de Robespierre as its representative. At this time, 52 representatives formed the Departmental Council of the Commune. On 16 August, Robespierre presented a petition to the Legislative Assembly from the Paris Commune to demand the establishment of a provisional Revolutionary Tribunal that had to deal with the "traitors" and "enemies of the people". On 21 August, it succeeded in dissolving the separate department of Paris; the Commune took its place, combining local and regional power under one body. The all-powerful Commune demanded custody of the royal family, imprisoning them in the Temple fortress. A list of "opponents of the Revolution" was drawn up, the gates to the city were sealed, and on 28 August the citizens were subjected to domiciliary visits, ostensibly in a search for muskets. A sharp conflict developed between the Legislative and the Commune and its sections. On 30 August the interim minister of Interior Roland and Guadet tried to suppress the influence of the Commune because the sections had exhausted the searches. The Assembly, tired of the pressures, declared the Commune illegal and suggested the organization of communal elections. On Sunday morning 2 September the members of the Commune, gathering in the town hall to proceed the election of deputies to the National Convention, decided to maintain their seats and have Rolland and Brissot arrested.

== September Massacres ==
One of the bloodiest consequences of the Paris Commune was the September Massacres, and their exact origins continue to be a source of historical debate around the internal politics of the Paris Commune. Between 2 and 6 September, an estimated 1,100–1,600 people were killed by around 235 forces loyal to the Commune who had been responsible for guarding the prisons of Paris, and it is estimated that half of the prison population of Paris was massacred by the evening of 6 September. A culture of fear had emerged amidst the ongoing wars with Austria and Prussia, and the Jacobins had propagated a culture of conspiracy and revenge which singled out a potentially disloyal prison population; fearing that political prisoners and the many Swiss prisoners in Parisian jails would side with either an advancing foreign or counter-revolutionary army. Furthermore, the culture of revolutionary terror also prompted an opportunistic desire for revenge, and all of this coupled with the instability of the state and location of power, and the precarity of ordinary Parisian life fuelled a culture of extreme fear and paranoia that would eventually fuel the mass violence which was rationalised as a pre-emptive act. On 2 September, Danton gave a speech in the Legislative Assembly specifically singling out internal enemies, and called for volunteers to take arms against them and assemble together in Paris immediately. He insisted "any one refusing to give personal service or to furnish arms shall be punished with death", and claimed that the salvation of France rested upon ordinary citizens taking up arms against potential traitors. The very next day the massacres began, and within 24 hours, 1,000 people had been killed. Jean-Paul Marat, heading the surveillance committee of the Commune, immediately started the mass dissemination of a notice imploring all patriots to eliminate counter-revolutionaries themselves as soon as possible, and Jean-Lambert Tallien, the secretary of the commune, called for an expansion of the mass action beyond Paris as a patriotic duty. A huge wave of violence followed, often organised through revolutionary sections, and the prison population was halved through the massacres. However, for all the rhetoric of dangerous political prisoners posing a threat to Paris, only a minority were political prisoners, and the vast majority were not political prisoners (72%), in fact some of them were children. The after-effects of the massacres were severe, and the assassination of Marat by Charlotte Corday (a Girondin sympathiser) on 13 July 1793, who blamed him for the violence, triggered an even further wave of radicalisation amongst Jacobins, as a cult of martyrdom emerged around him. Blame for the massacres remains controversial, but Danton and his inflammatory rhetoric is the most frequent figure emphasised by historians. However, Gwynne Lewis emphasises the "sanguinary outbursts in the press" promoted by Marat and notes that the massacres marked a watershed in a troubled history between the people and the political elite in a new combination of forces unleashed by revolution, counter-revolution, and the support of both amongst conflicting popular and elite forces. William Doyle further argues that Danton's irresponsibility in provoking the violence served to devalue the popularity of the revolution on a local, domestic, and international level.

== Insurrection of 31 May – 2 June 1793 ==
It called for the reinstatement of the Revolutionary Tribunal to try political opponents, and on 10 March 1793, the tribunal was restored. On 18 April the Commune announced an insurrection against the convention after the arrest of Jean-Paul Marat. Mid May Marat and the Commune supported Robespierre publicly and secretly. On 25 May, the Commune demanded that Hébert be released. The president of the Convention Maximin Isnard, who had enough of the tyranny of the Commune, threatened with the total destruction of Paris. "If the Commune does not unite closely with the people, it violates its most sacred duty", Robespierre said. In the afternoon the Commune demanded the creation of a Revolutionary army of sansculottes in every town of France, including 20,000 men to defend Paris. The next day the Commune decided to create a revolutionary army of 20,000 men to protect and defend Paris. On Saturday 1 June the Commune gathered almost all day. Unsatisfied with the result the commune demanded and prepared a "Supplement" to the revolution for the next day. Hanriot was ordered to march his National Guard from the town hall to the National Palace. "The armed force", Hanriot said, "will retire only when the Convention has delivered to the people the deputies denounced by the Commune." The insurrection was organized by the Paris Commune and supported by Montagnards.

The tribunal presided over the arrest, trial, and execution of the Girondins (see Insurrection of 31 May – 2 June 1793), and the enactment of the law of General Maximum on 29 September 1793. It played an essential role in the revolutionary wars following 1793, forming militias and providing weaponry to many of the revolutionary armies during the Reign of Terror.

== Defeat of the Girondins ==
The Commune took charge of routine civic functions but is best known for mobilizing the people towards direct democracy and insurrection when it deemed the Revolution to be in danger, as well as for its campaign to dechristianize the country. This campaign of dechristianization was spearheaded by many prominent figures within the Commune, such as the minister of war Jean-Nicolas Pache who sought to disseminate the profoundly anti-clerical work of Jacques Hébert by purchasing thousands of copies of his books and his radical newspaper Le Père Duchesne for free distribution to the public. The Hébertists amongst the Communards managed to successfully transform Notre-Dame and numerous other churches into Temples of Reason, further entrenching the Commune's political commitment to the Cult of Reason. As the Commune became increasingly radical and Jacobin-dominated it aligned itself with radical left Montagnard ideas and policies, and was headed by Pierre Gaspard Chaumette and Hébert himself from November 1792 – some of the most extreme voices within the Commune – until their overthrow and eventual execution, along with 91 other members of the Commune, as part of the Thermidorian coup in July 1794.

The internal politics of the Commune and its political culture had a huge impact on the Insurrection of 31 May - 2 June 1793 and the fall of the Girondins. The Jacobin dominance of the Commune existed in strong tension with the much more moderate Girondins who dominated the Legislative Assembly. When the National Convention effectively replaced it in September 1792, the Girondins remained more powerful than the radical left Montagnards, and most of the Convention's power and control over most of France remained in their hands. But by 1793, massive challenges to the legitimacy and reputation of the Girondins, such as the wars with Austria and Prussia, and the insurrectionary War in the Vendée began to destroy their popular support. The massacres of tens of thousands of people in the royalist Vendée uprising exposed just how deep the divides between urban and rural France were, how little practical control the Girondins had over a unified French republic, and how ineffective they were at holding true to democratic principles. France was effectively moving into the Civil War, and republicans were increasingly switching loyalty to the Montagnards. Amidst this crisis, in the Paris Commune, Marat sent a letter to throughout the provincial societies encouraging them to demand the recall of the appellants, which resulted in the Convention demanding he be put before a Revolutionary Tribunal. Outraged by this, most of the Parisian sections sent an outraged petition threatening the Girondins with an effective insurrection. In response to this, the Girondins launched a political assault on the Paris Commune as an institution, arresting Hébert for an inflammatory article he had published in his paper, and two other Jacobin Communards. This then triggered the declaration of an open Jacobin uprising, and Robespierre called upon the people to join in the revolt. A popular revolutionary army of around 20,000 men inside the Commune was formed, and the sections formed an insurrectionary committee. On 31 May, an uprising attempt began unsuccessfully, and the smaller than expected forces who gathered were unable to take the Convention in any meaningful way, and Jean-Francois Varlet accused Hébert and Dobson of weakness at the evening meeting of the Commune for the poorly planned attempt at ousting the Girondins. In response to this, the Commune gathered all day on 1 June, with the understanding that a Sunday uprising would mean a much better attendance of sans-culottes. After a full day of Communard planning, in the evening 40,000 troops surrounded the Convention, trapping the Girondins inside. They spent much of 2 June fiercely denouncing the Jacobins and the Paris Commune itself through speeches, arguing for its suppression, but as the Vendée fell to rebels, inspiring revolutionary outrage, Francois Hanriot ordered the National Guard to march on the convention and join those Communard forces to oust the Girondins who had lost the faith of republicans. The Convention, now having the National Guard around it, demanded that the ousting of the Girondins be blamed for France's disintegration. Girondin deputies attempting to leave were arrested as the Convention was stormed, and the president of the Convention came out to plead with Hanriot to remove the troops, but he refused to do so, and under this pressure, the Convention itself ended upvoted for the arrest of those 22 leading Girondins – effectively destroying them as a political force. Marat and Couthon hailed Hanriot as a hero of the revolution, and he became seen as a hero of the Commune itself. This insurrection sparked by the Jacobins led to a new Montagnard governing force, the defeat of their Girondin enemies, and a completely new revolutionary government for France.

From 4 December 1793, the Commune of Paris and the revolutionary committees in the sections had to obey the law, the two Committees, and the convention. Within three weeks majority of the Committee of Public Safety decided that the ultra-left Hébertists would have to perish or their opposition within the committee would overshadow the other factions due to its influence in the Commune of Paris.

In Summer 1794 the commune had to solve serious problems in the cemeteries because of the smell. On 23 July the Commune published a new maximum, limiting the wages of employees (in some cases by half) and provoking a sharp protest in the sections. On 27 July the Paris Commune gave orders to close the gates (and to ring the tocsin), and summoned an immediate meeting of the sections to consider the dangers threatening the fatherland. The Paris Commune was in league with the Jacobins to bring off an insurrection, asking them to send over reinforcements from the galleries, ‘even the women who are regulars there’. At around 10 p.m., the mayor Jean-Baptiste Fleuriot-Lescot appointed a delegation to go and convince Robespierre to join the Commune movement. After a whole evening spent waiting in vain for action by the Commune, losing time in fruitless deliberation, without supplies or instructions, the armed sections began to disperse.

== Thermidorian reaction and decline of the commune ==
It was not until 1792 that the government had a formal cabinet in place, with the appointment of the Ministers of the French National Convention and the decision of the Commissioners of the Committee of Public Safety in 1794 to take charge of administrative departments, but the increased and consolidated power of the National Convention by 1794 now meant that they could challenge the insurrectionary and often hostile power of the Paris Commune. The ousting of Robespierre on 27 July 1794 (or 9 Thermidor year II in the revolutionary calendar), marked a huge organised counter-revolution against the radical left and Robespierre himself from the National Convention, and this naturally spelled trouble for the Paris Commune. When he was detained, the troops of the Paris Commune under Hanriot who were largely loyal to him organised an attempt to liberate him, which was in turn met by a counter-attack from Convention forces. They barricaded themselves into the Hotel de Ville, and on 28 July, the Convention forces succeeded in capturing Robespierre and the supporters who remained with him and executed them on the same day. Almost half of the Paris Commune (70 members) were executed on 29 July, as were many members of Jacobin club who had supported Robespierre - marking the beginning of the White Terror. With the execution of most of its members, the Commune was effectively a proxy of the National Convention, and subject to its direct rule. In response to this, Francois-Noel Babeuf and democratic militants associated with him - organised through a newly created Electoral Club - demanded the restoration of the Commune, but were unsuccessful in achieving their aims. The government of the republic was then succeeded by the French Directory in November 1795, formally ending the Commune, but its after-effects remained strong in the Parisian imagination, and the memory of the 18th Century Commune provided inspiration for the later Communards of the Paris Commune of 1871. However, with that later Commune of 1871, and his traumatic experiences of it, Hippolyte Taine writing in L'Origine de la France Contemporaine critically expressed the idea that there were strong reverberations of the 18th Century Commune, given how the 19th Century one restored institutions such as the Committee of Public Safety of 1793–1794.

== Women's rights ==
In 1791, the French Revolutionary Constitution attributed women to the category of "passive" citizens. Later, in 1793, the Jacobin Constitution did not allow women to vote. In 1795 some men lost their right to vote and the notion of "passive" citizenship was no longer in use, meaning that women lost their rights to be called citizens at all. The lack of rights was not unusual at the time for most working-class and middle-class women, however, it significantly influenced those more wealthy who liked to be involved and could exercise some influence through their salons or their husbands.

The 1791 Constitution acknowledged that marriage was a civil contract, and with time divorce became a possibility. In the early 1790s women also gained an opportunity to legally inherit property.

In general, there was an upheaval in women’s political involvement which started with the Parisian Women's March on Versailles in 1789. Women were also involved in political discussions. For example, the Jacobin Club was for men only, however, their public meetings were open to everyone. Even though women did not speak on the stage, attending and voicing their support of or disagreement with certain speakers was a way to be politically proactive.

Maximilien Robespierre, a member of the Jacobin Club, rose to power in 1792, and his popularity is largely attributed to his female supporters. Robespierre, however, was not an advocate for women’s rights, and a lot of contemporary female activists opposed his policies. Among those activists was Madame Roland who held salons for the Girondins, bourgeois republicans, around 1791. Her party’s political disagreements with Robespierre had led to their falling out.

Olympe de Gouges, another prominent activist on the French political arena at the time, had published the Declaration of the Rights of Woman and of the Female Citizen (1791) addressing the 1789 Declaration of the Rights of Man and of the Citizen. In her work, she criticised the revolution for not addressing gender inequality. Similar to Mme Roland, Olympe de Gouges was associated with the bourgeois republicans and has favoured the idea of the constitutional monarchy, causing her to criticise Robespierre and the Montagnards after the execution of Louis XVI. De Gouges’ criticism of the revolutionary movement in her writing and her affiliation to the Girondins led to her being convicted of treason and she was executed along with other party members (including Madame Roland) in November 1793.

During the Reign of Terror activism began to decline. Most clubs and salons were closed in 1794 and women were prohibited from going into the Convention’s galleries.

== See also ==
- Paris Commune of 1871

== Notes ==
=== Sources ===
- Hampson, Norman (1974). The Life and Opinions of Maximilien Robespierre. Duckworth. ISBN 978-0-7156-0741-1.
- Israel, Jonathan (2014). Revolutionary Ideas: An Intellectual History of the French Revolution from The Rights of Man to Robespierre. Princeton University Press. ISBN 978-1-4008-4999-4.
- Schama, Simon (1989). Citizens : a Chronicle of the French Revolution. New York: Alfred A. Knopf. ISBN 978-0-394-55948-3.
