= Jacques Hébert =

French journalist and politician (1757–1794)

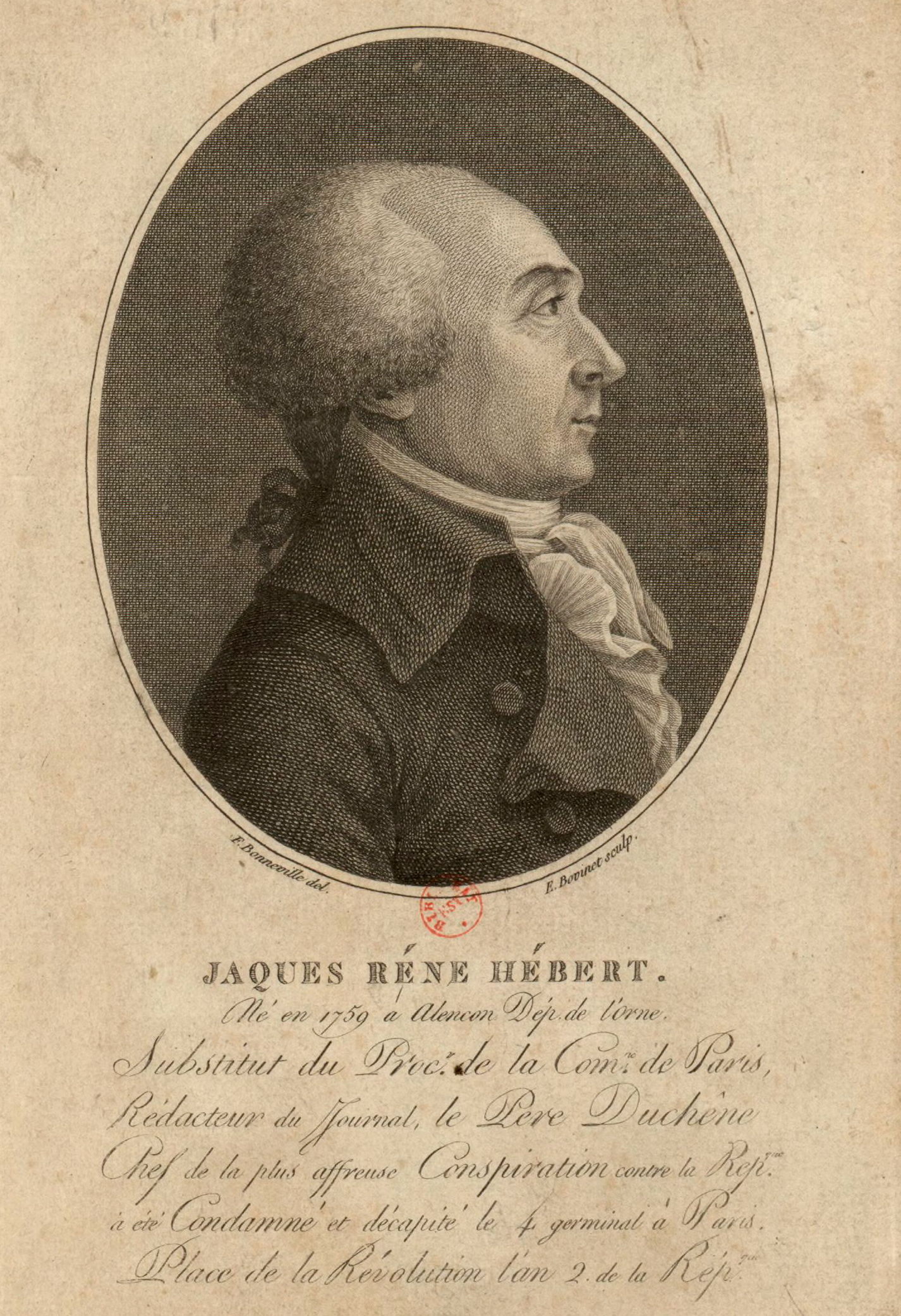

Personal details
- Born: Jacques René Hébert; 15 November 1757 Alençon, Kingdom of France
- Died: 24 March 1794 (aged 36) Paris, French First Republic
- Cause of death: Beheaded
- Resting place: Errancis Cemetery
- Party: The Mountain (1792–1794)
- Other political affiliations: Jacobin Club (1789–1792); Cordeliers Club (1792–1794)
- Spouse: Marie Marguerite Françoise Hébert (m. 1792)
- Children: Virginie-Scipion Hébert (1793–1830)
- Parent(s): Jacques Hébert (?–1766) and Marguerite La Beunaiche de Houdré (1727–1787)
- Occupation: Journalist, writer, publisher, politician
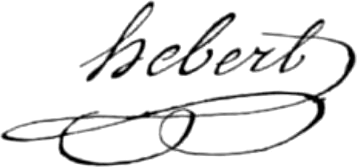
- Signature

Jacques René Hébert (French: [ʒak ʁəne ebɛʁ]; 15 November 1757 – 24 March 1794) was a French journalist and a prominent figure of the French Revolution. The founder and editor of the radical newspaper Le Père Duchesne, he was the chief spokesman for the Parisian sans-culottes. He and his followers, known as the Hébertists, played a major role in ushering in some of the most radical measures of the revolutionary period that culminated in the Reign of Terror.

Born in Alençon into a bourgeois family, Hébert was brought to ruin by a lawsuit and fled to Paris in 1780, where he lived in destitution for nearly a decade. At the outbreak of the revolution he found success as a pamphleteer, and in 1790 he founded Le Père Duchesne, a newspaper noted for its provocative tone and ribald language that enjoyed immense popularity and widespread circulation among the Parisian working class. Hébert initially advocated in favour of a constitutional monarchy, focusing his attacks on the aristocracy and clergy. Following Louis XVI's failed flight to Varennes, he became violently critical of the monarchy as well. A member of the Cordeliers club, Hébert supported the Insurrection of 10 August 1792 and the September Massacres, and through his vitriolic rhetoric he played an active role in the fall of the Girondins in mid-1793.

Hébert advocated for a programme of radical dechristianization, which brought him into conflict with Maximilien Robespierre, whom he denounced as too moderate. The Committee of Public Safety, long concerned by the ultra-revolutionary excesses of the Hébertists, ultimately decided to take action. Following a failed call for an insurrection, Hébert was arrested in 13 March 1794 and denounced. He was guillotined ten days later.

== Early life ==
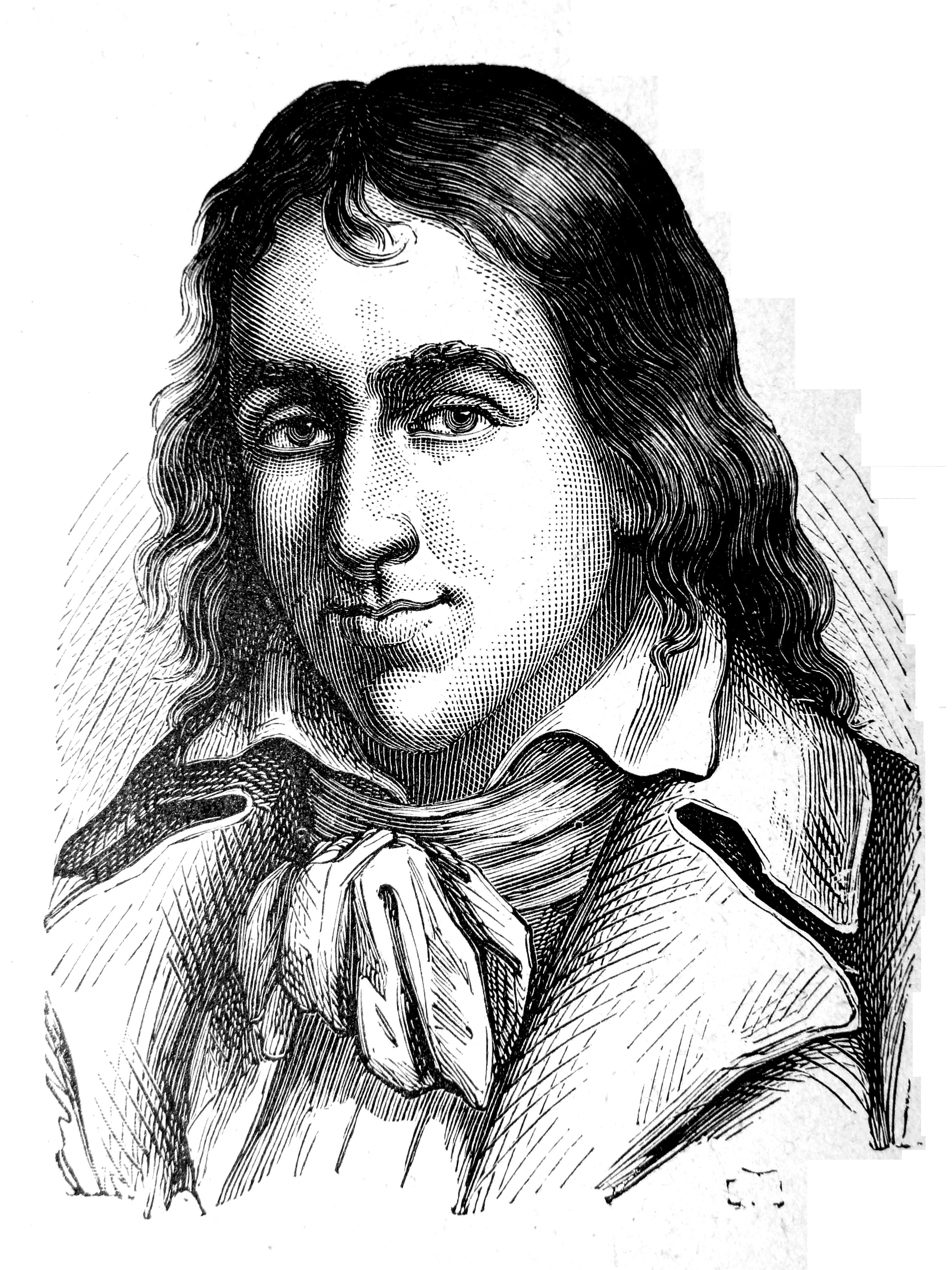
Hébert arrived in Paris in 1780, at the age of 23.

Jacques René Hébert was born on 15 November 1757 in Alençon into a Protestant Huguenot family, to goldsmith, former trial judge, and deputy consul Jacques Hébert (died 1766) and Marguerite Beunaiche de Houdrie (1727–1787).

Hébert studied law at the College of Alençon and went into practice as a clerk to a solicitor in Alençon, where he was ruined by a lawsuit against Dr. Clouet. Hébert fled first to Rouen and then to Paris in 1780 to evade a substantial 1000 livre fine imposed for charges of slander. For a while, he passed through a difficult financial time and was supported by a hairdresser in Rue des Noyers. There he found work in a theater, La République, where he wrote plays in his spare time; but these were never produced. Hébert was eventually fired for theft and entered the service of a doctor. It is said he lived through expediency and fraud.

In 1789, he began his writing with a pamphlet La Lanterne magique ou le Fléau des Aristocrates ("The Magic Lantern, or Scourge of Aristocrats"). He published a few booklets. In 1790, he attracted attention with a pamphlet he published and became a prominent member of the Cordeliers political club in 1791.

== Père Duchesne ==
Many writers and journalists were greatly influenced by the proclamation of martial law on 21 October 1789. It raised various questions and patterns of Revolutionary thinking and inspired various forms of writing, including those based on the character of Père Duchesne (Father Duchesne). The law prompted multiple interpretations, all of which led to what became essential Revolutionary ideals.

From 1790 until his death in 1794, Hébert served as a voice for the working class of Paris through his highly successful and influential journal, Le Père Duchesne. In his journal, Hébert assumed the voice of a patriotic sans-culotte named Père Duchesne and would write first-person narratives in which Père Duchesne would often relay fictitious conversations that he had with the French monarchs or government officials. Hébert did not use himself as the prime example of the revolution. He used the mythical character Père Duchesne to relay his message anonymously. Père Duchesne was already well known to the people of Paris, and Hébert wanted only his message to be received directly and clearly by his followers. Père Duchesne was a strong, outspoken, highly emotional character. He felt great anger but also could experience great happiness. He was never afraid to show exactly how he was feeling. He would constantly use foul language and other harsh words to express himself, while also being witty and reflective. The stories resonated deeply in the poorer Parisian quarters. This could encourage violent behavior. Street hawkers would yell, Il est bougrement en colère aujourd’hui le père Duchesne! ("Father Duchesne is very angry today!"). Although Hébert did not create the image of the Père Duchesne, his use of the character helped to transform the symbolic image of Père Duchesne from that of a comical stove-merchant into a patriotic role model for the sans-culottes. In part, Hébert's use of Père Duchesne as a revolutionary symbol can be seen by the character's appearance as a bristly old man who was portrayed as smoking a pipe and wearing a Phrygian cap.

Hébert and the Hébertists often argued that many more aristocrats should be examined, denounced, and executed, as they believed France could only be fully reborn through the elimination of its ancient and supposedly malignant nobility. In Le Père Duchesne number 65, where he writes of his reawakening in 1790, he defines aristocrats as "enemies of the constitution" who "conspire against the nation". Much of Hébert's celebrity came from his denunciations of King Louis XVI in his newspaper, as opposed to any office he may have held or his roles in any of the Parisian clubs with which he was involved.

Because Père Duchesne reflected both his audience's speech and dress, his readers listened to and acted on his message. The French linguist and historian Ferdinand Brunot called Hébert "the Homer of filth" because of his ability to use common language to appeal to a general audience. In addition, Père Duchesne's appearance played into the tensions of the revolution through the sharp contrast between his laborer's clothing and the elegant attire of the aristocracy. Hébert was not the only writer during the French Revolution to use the image of Père Duchesne nor was he the only author in the period to adopt foul language as a way of appealing to the working class. Another writer at the time, Antoine-François Lemaire, also wrote a newspaper entitled Père Duchêne (although he spelt it differently than Hébert) from September 1790 until May 1792 in which he assumed the voice of a "moderate patriot" who wanted to conserve the relationship between the King and the nation. Lemaire's character also used a slew of profanities and would address France's military. However, Le Père Duchesne became far more popular because it cost less than Jean-Paul Marat's paper, L'Ami du peuple. This made it easier for people like the sans-culottes to access. Its popularity was also partly due to the Paris Commune deciding to buy his papers and distribute them to the French soldiers in training. For example, starting in 1792, the Paris Commune and the ministers of war Jean-Nicolas Pache and, later, Jean Baptiste Noël Bouchotte bought several thousand copies of Le Père Duchesne which were distributed free to the public and troops. This happened again in May and June 1793, when the Minister of War bought copies of newspapers to "enlighten and animate their patriotism". It is estimated that Hébert received 205,000 livres from this purchase. The assassination of Jean-Paul Marat, on July 13, 1793, led to Le Père Duchesne becoming the incontestable best-selling paper in Paris.

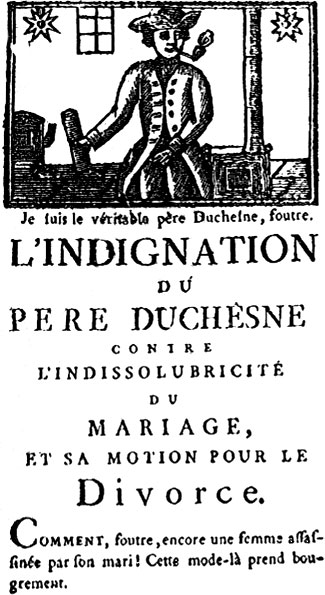
"The Indignation of Père Duchesne" (1790)

Hébert's political commentary between 1790 and 1793 focused on the monarchy's lavish excesses. Initially, from 1790 and into 1792, Le Père Duchesne supported a constitutional monarchy and was even favorable towards King Louis XVI and the opinions of the Marquis de Lafayette. His violent attacks of the period were aimed at Jean-Sifrein Maury, a great defender of papal authority and the main opponent of the Civil Constitution of the Clergy. Although the character of Père Duchesne supported a constitutional monarchy, he was always highly critical of Marie Antoinette. Knowing that the queen was an easy target for ridicule after the Diamond Necklace Affair, she became a consistent target in the paper as a scapegoat for many of France's political problems. By identifying Marie Antoinette's lavish excesses and alleged sexuality as the core of the monarchy's problems, Hébert's articles suggested that if Marie Antoinette changed her ways and renounced aristocratic excesses, the monarchy could be saved and the queen could regain the people's goodwill. Despite his view that the monarchy could be restored, Hébert was skeptical of the queen's willingness to comply and often characterized her as an evil enemy of the people by referring to the queen as "Madame Veto" and even addressing King Louis XVI as, "drunken and lazy; a cuckolded pig". Initially, Hébert was trying to not only educate his readers about the queen, but also awaken her to how she was viewed by the French public. This gave Marie Antoinette a pivotal role in Hébert's political rhetoric; as the Revolution unfolded, she appears in 14% of his newspaper articles between January 1791 and March 1794. Many of the fictitious conversations that Père Duchesne has with her in the newspaper are attempts at either showcasing her supposed nymphomania or attempting to beg her to repent and renounce her wicked ways. With the king's failed flight to Varennes, Hébert's tone significantly hardened.

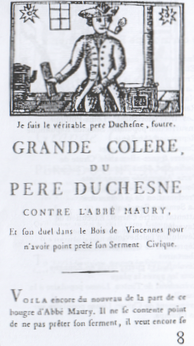
"The Great Anger of Père Duchesne" (1792).

== Revolutionary role ==
Following Louis's failed flight to Varennes in June 1791, Hébert began to attack both Louis and Pope Pius VI. On 17 July, Hébert was at the Champ de Mars to sign a petition to demand the removal of King Louis XVI and was caught up in the subsequent Champ de Mars massacre by troops under the Marquis de Lafayette. This put him in the revolutionary mindset, and Le Père Duchesne adopted a populist style, deliberately opposed to the high-minded seriousness and appeal to reason expressed by other revolutionaries, to better appeal to the Parisian sans-culottes. His journalistic voice expressed separation from, and violent opposition to, cultured elites, in favor of a popular political allegiance to radical patriotic solutions for controlling the economy and winning the war. Le Père Duchesne began to attack prominent political figures like Lafayette, head of the National Guard; the deceased Comte de Mirabeau, a prominent orator and statesman; and Jean Sylvain Bailly, mayor of Paris. In a 1793 speech to the public, Hébert stated his beliefs regarding Lafayette. He noted that there were two Père Duchesnes, who opposed each other deeply. The Père Duchesne that he said he identified with was the "honest and loyal Père Duchesne who has pursued traitors", while the Père Duchesne he had nothing to do with "praised Lafayette to the heavens".

As a member of Cordeliers club, he had a seat in the revolutionary Paris Commune, and during the Insurrection of 10 August 1792 he was sent to the Bonne-Nouvelle section of Paris. As a public journalist, he supported the September Massacres the next month. He agreed with most of the ideals of the radical Montagnard faction, even though he was not a member. On 22 December 1792, he was appointed the second substitute of the procureur of the commune, and through to August 1793 supported the attacks against the Girondin faction.

In April–May 1793 he, along with Marat and others, violently attacked the Girondins. On 20 May 1793, the moderate majority of the National Convention formed the Special Commission of Twelve, a Girondin commission which was designed to investigate and prosecute conspirators. At the urging of the Twelve, he was arrested on 24 May 1793. However, Hébert had been warned in time, and, with the support of the sans-culottes, the National Convention was forced to order his release three days later. Just four days after that, his anti-Girondin rhetoric would help lead to their ousting in the Insurrection of 31 May – 2 June. On 28 August 1793, he proposed to the Jacobins to write an address taking up the demands of the Enragés, and to have it taken to the Convention by the Jacobins, the 48 sections, and the popular societies, a suggestion greatly applauded by Billaud-Varenne and others, ignoring Maximilien Robespierre's warning against a riot "which would fill the aristocrats with joy".

During all this, Hébert met his wife Marie Goupil (born 1756), a 37-year-old former nun who had left convent life at the Sisters of Providence convent at Rue Saint-Honoré. Marie's passport from this time shows regular use. They married on 7 February 1792, and had a daughter, Virginie-Scipion Hébert (7 February 1793 – 13 July 1830). During this time, Hébert led a luxurious, bourgeois life. He entertained Jean-Nicolas Pache, the mayor of Paris and Minister of War, for weeks, as well as other influential men, and liked to dress elegantly and surround himself with beautiful objects such as pretty tapestries—an attitude that can be contrasted to that of Paris Commune president Pierre Gaspard Chaumette. Where he got the financial resources to support his lifestyle is unclear; however, there are Jean-Nicolas Pache's commissions to print thousands of issues of Le Père Duchesne and his relationship to Delaunay d'Angers, mistress and wife of Andres Maria de Guzman. In February 1793, he voted with fellow bourgeois Hébertists against a Maximum Price Act, a price ceiling on grain, on the grounds that it would cause hoarding and stir resentment.

== Dechristianization ==
Dechristianization was a movement that took hold during the French Revolution. Advocates believed that to pursue a secular society, they had to reject the superstitions of the Old Regime and, by extension, Catholicism altogether. The trend toward secularization had already begun to take hold throughout France during the 18th century, but between September 1793 and August 1794, mostly during the Reign of Terror, French politicians began discussing and embracing notions of "radical dechristianization". While Robespierre advocated for the right to religion and believed that aggressively pursuing dechristianization would spur widespread revolts throughout rural France, Hébert and his followers, the Hébertists, wanted to spontaneously and violently overhaul religion. The writer and philosopher Voltaire was an inspiration to Hébert on this front. Like Voltaire, Hébert believed that the toleration of different religious beliefs was necessary for humanity to pass from an age of superstitions, and that traditional religion was an obstacle to this goal. Eventually, Hébert would argue that Jesus was not God but rather a good sans-culotte. Voltaire had also provided him with the basic tenets of a civic religion that could replace traditional religion, which led Hébert to become heavily involved in the movement. The program of dechristianization waged against Catholicism, and eventually against all forms of Christianity, included the deportation of clergy and the condemnation of many of them to death, the closing of churches, the institution of revolutionary and civic cults, the large scale destruction of religious monuments, the outlawing of public and private worship and religious education, forced marriages of the clergy, and forced abjurement of their priesthood. On 21 October 1793, a law was passed which made all suspected priests and all persons who harbored them liable to death on sight.

On 10 November 1793, dechristianization reached what many historians consider the climax of the movement when the Hébertists moved the first Festival of Reason (Fête de la Raison), a civic festival celebrating the Goddess of Reason, from the Circus of the Palais Royale to the Cathedral of Notre Dame and reclaimed the cathedral as a "Temple of Reason". On 7 June, Robespierre, who had previously condemned the Cult of Reason, advocated a new state religion and recommended that the Convention acknowledge the existence of a singular God. On the next day, the worship of the deistic Supreme Being was inaugurated as an official aspect of the Revolution. Compared with Hébert's somewhat popular festivals, this austere new religion of Virtue was met with hostility by the Parisian public.

== Clash with Robespierre, arrest, conviction, and execution ==
After successfully attacking the Girondins, Hébert, in the fall of 1793, continued to attack those whom he viewed as too moderate, including Georges Danton, Pierre Philippeaux, and Maximilien Robespierre, among others. When Hébert accused Marie Antoinette during her trial of incest with her son, Robespierre called him a fool (imbécile) for his outrageous and unsubstantiated innuendos and lies.

The government was exasperated and, with support from the Jacobins, finally decided to strike against the Hébertists on the night of 13 March 1794, despite the reluctance of Barère de Vieuzac, Collot d'Herbois, and Billaud-Varenne. The order was to arrest the leaders of the Hébertists, including individuals in the War Ministry and others.

In the Revolutionary Tribunal, Hébert was treated very differently from Danton, more like a thief than a conspirator; his earlier frauds were brought to light and criticized. He was sentenced to death with his co-defendants on the third day of deliberations. Their execution by guillotine took place on 24 March 1794. Hébert fainted several times on the way to the guillotine and screamed hysterically when he was placed under the blade. Hébert's executioners reportedly amused the crowd by adjusting the guillotine so that its blade stopped inches above his neck, and it was only after the fourth time the lever (déclic) was pulled that he was actually beheaded. His corpse was disposed of in the Madeleine Cemetery. His widow was executed 20 days later on 13 April 1794, and her corpse was disposed of in the Errancis Cemetery.

The importance of Hébert's execution was known by everyone involved in the revolution, including the Jacobins. Louis Antoine de Saint-Just, a prominent Jacobin leader, noted that following his execution, "the revolution is frozen", demonstrating how central Hébert and his followers, a large portion of sans-culottes, were to the longevity and success of the revolution.

== Influence ==
It is difficult to ascertain the extent to which Hébert's publication Le Père Duchesne impacted the outcomes of political events between 1790 and 1794. Historians such as Jean-Paul Bertaud, Jeremy D. Popkin, and William J. Murray each investigated the history of the French Revolutionary press and concluded that while the newspapers and magazines people read during the revolution may have influenced political leanings, the periodicals did not necessarily create those political leanings. One's class, for example, could be a significant determinant of one's political decisions. Therefore, Hébert's writings certainly influenced his audience to an often dramatic extent, but the sans-culottes were but one element in a complex political mix, meaning that it is difficult to determine in what ways his writing changed the political outcomes of the French Revolution. That being said, his wide readership and voice throughout the Revolution means that he was a significant public figure, and Le Père Duchesne's ability to influence the general population of France was indeed notable.

== Gallery ==
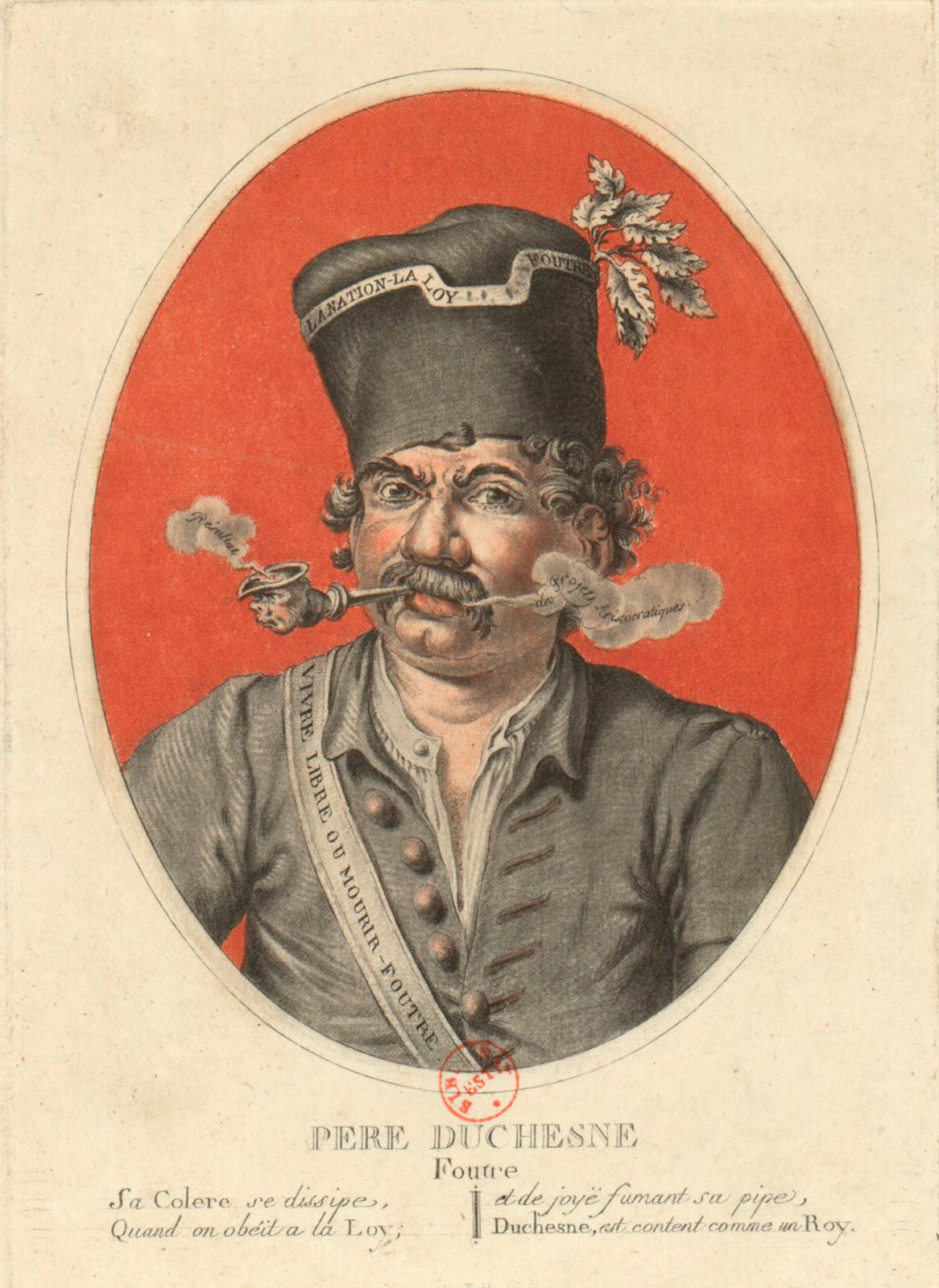
Illustration from Le Père Duchesne broadsides

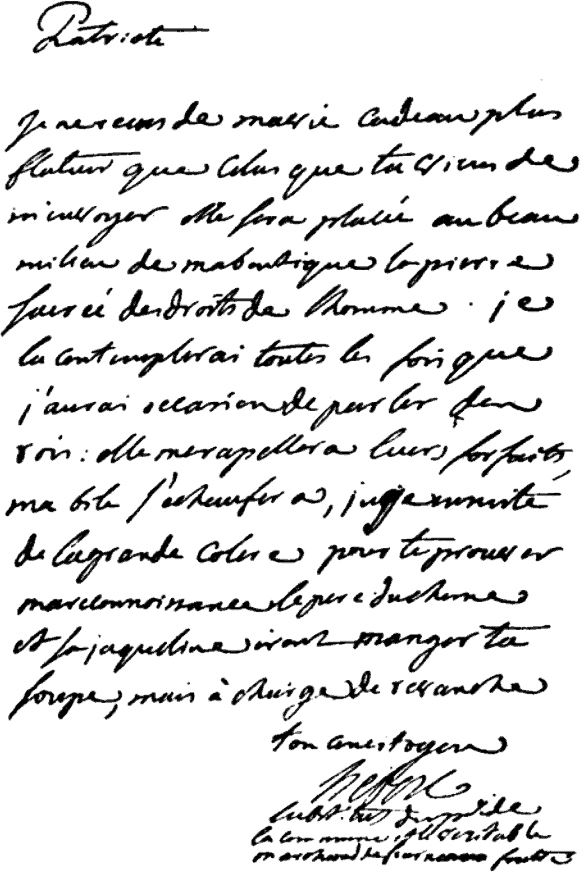
Letter by Jacques Hébert to citizen Pierre-François Palloy
