= Commissioners of the Committee of Public Safety =

French government from 1794–95

- France; Cabinet of France
- Date formed: 1 April 1794
- Date dissolved: 1 November 1795

People and organisations
- Head of state: Committee of Public Safety

History
- Predecessor: Ministers of the French National Convention
- Successor: French Directory

The Commissioners of the Committee of Public Safety (French: Commissions exécutives) were appointed by the French Committee of Public Safety to oversee the various administrative departments between 1 April 1794 and 1 November 1795.

== History ==
On 12 Germinal year II (1 April 1794) Lazare Carnot proposed suppressing the Executive Council and the six ministers, replacing the ministers with twelve committees reporting to the Committee of Public Safety. The proposal was unanimously adopted by the National Convention.

The commissioners were dismissed when a new set of ministers was named by the French Directory on 3 November 1795.

== Committees ==
Twelve committees were appointed, each composed of two members and one assistant, reporting to the Committee of Public Safety. The commissions were:

1. Civil administration, police and tribunals
2. Public education
3. Agriculture and the arts
4. Commerce and supplies
5. Public works
6. Public assistance
7. Transport, posts and couriers
8. Finance
9. Movement of land armies
10. Navy and colonies
11. Armaments, powder and mining
12. Foreign affairs

== Committee members ==
The committee members, or commissioners, were:

Commissioner	Committee	Start	End
Jean-Pierre Chazal	Armament	7 February 1795	5 March 1795
Jacques Antoine Rabaut-Pommier	Armament	5 May 1795	1 September 1795
François-Joseph Gamon	Armament	3 June 1795	7 October 1795
Louis-Félix Roux de la Haute-Marne	Commerce and Supplies	4 April 1795	3 July 1795
Jean-Lambert Tallien	Commerce and Supplies	5 April 1795	2 August 1795
Théodore Vernier	Commerce and Supplies	5 May 1795	1 September 1795
Pierre Marec	Commerce and Supplies	3 June 1795	7 October 1795
Théophile Berlier	Commerce and Supplies	1 September 1795	7 October 1795
Charles Gourdan	Commerce and Supplies	7 October 1795	27 October 1795
Joseph Eschassériaux	Commerce and Supplies	7 October 1795	27 October 1795
Dominique Ramel de Nogaret	Constitution	30 May 1793	10 July 1793
Marie-Jean Hérault de Séchelles	Constitution	5 June 1793	29 December 1793
Jean-François Reubell	Diplomacy	5 March 1795	3 July 1795
Emmanuel Joseph Sieyès	Diplomacy	2 August 1795	27 October 1795
Emmanuel Joseph Sieyès	Foreign Affairs	5 March 1795	3 July 1795
Philippe-Antoine Merlin de Douai	Foreign Affairs	5 April 1795	3 June 1795
Jean-Baptiste Louvet de Couvray	Foreign Affairs	3 July 1795	27 October 1795
Jean-Antoine Debry	Foreign Affairs	3 July 1795	27 October 1795
François-Antoine de Boissy d'Anglas	Foreign Affairs	3 July 1795	27 October 1795
Bertrand Barère	Foreign Affairs, Navy, Military affairs	6 April 1793	31 July 1794
Bertrand Barère	Foreign Affairs, Navy, Military Affairs	31 July 1794	1 September 1794
Louis Antoine de Saint-Just	General correspondence, Military affairs	30 May 1793	28 July 1794
Pierre-Joseph Cambon	Interior & Supplies	6 April 1793	10 July 1793
Louis-Bernard Guyton de Morveau	Interior and Supplies	6 April 1793	10 July 1793
Jean-Jacques Bréard	Justice	6 April 1793	5 June 1793
Jean Baptiste Treilhard	Justice	6 April 1793	13 June 1793
Théophile Berlier	Justice	5 June 1793	10 July 1793
Jean-Antoine Debry	Member	6 April 1793	7 April 1793
Georges Danton	Member	6 April 1793	10 July 1793
Jean-Baptiste Mathieu-Mirampal	Member	30 May 1793	22 June 1793
Georges Couthon	Member	30 May 1793	28 July 1794
Jean Bon Saint-André	Member	13 June 1793	31 July 1794
Jacques-Alexis Thuriot de la Rosière	Member	10 July 1793	20 September 1793
Pierre-Louis Prieur (de la Marne)	Member	10 July 1793	31 July 1794
Maximilien de Robespierre	Member	27 July 1793	28 July 1794
Claude-Antoine Prieur de la Côte d'or	Member	14 August 1793	31 July 1794
Lazare Carnot	Member	14 August 1793	31 July 1794
Jean-Marie Collot d'Herbois	Member	6 September 1793	31 July 1794
Jacques Nicolas Billaud-Varenne	Member	6 September 1793	31 July 1794
Jean-Lambert Tallien	Member	31 July 1794	1 September 1794
Jean-Marie Collot d'Herbois	Member	31 July 1794	1 September 1794
Claude-Antoine Prieur de la Côte d'or	Member	31 July 1794	7 October 1794
Lazare Carnot	Member	31 July 1794	7 October 1794
Jean Baptiste Treilhard	Member	31 July 1794	7 November 1794
Pierre-Antoine Laloy	Member	31 July 1794	7 November 1794
Joseph Eschassériaux	Member	31 July 1794	7 November 1794
Jacques-Alexis Thuriot de la Rosière	Member	31 July 1794	7 December 1794
Jean-Jacques Bréard	Member	31 July 1794	7 December 1794
Charles Cochon de Lapparent	Member	1 September 1794	7 December 1794
Philippe-Antoine Merlin de Douai	Member	1 September 1794	7 January 1795
Jean-Baptiste Mathieu-Mirampal	Member	1 September 1794	7 January 1795
Antoine François, comte de Fourcroy	Member	1 September 1794	7 January 1795
Jean-François-Bertrand Delmas	Member	1 September 1794	7 January 1795
Joseph Richard	Member	7 October 1794	7 February 1795
Pierre-Louis Prieur (de la Marne)	Member	7 October 1794	7 February 1795
Louis-Bernard Guyton de Morveau	Member	7 October 1794	7 February 1795
Jean Pelet de la Lozère	Member	7 November 1794	5 March 1795
Lazare Carnot	Member	7 November 1794	5 March 1795
Jean-Jacques Cambacérès	Member	7 November 1794	5 March 1795
André Dumont	Member	7 December 1794	5 April 1795
Jean-Jacques Bréard	Member	7 January 1795	5 May 1795
Philippe-Antoine Merlin de Douai	Member	7 February 1795	5 March 1795
Jean-Baptiste Mathieu-Mirampal	Member	7 February 1795	3 June 1795
Antoine François, comte de Fourcroy	Member	7 February 1795	5 June 1795
Denis Lesage d'Eure and Loir	Member	5 April 1795	5 May 1795
Jacques Antoine Creuzé-Latouche	Member	5 April 1795	5 May 1795
Pierre Henry-Larivière	Member	3 June 1795	7 October 1795
Denis Lesage d'Eure and Loir	Member	2 August 1795	27 October 1795
Louis-Marie de La Révellière-Lépeaux	Member	1 September 1795	1 September 1795
Jean-François Reubell	Military hospitals	2 August 1795	27 October 1795
Pierre Gillet	Military Supplies	5 April 1795	3 July 1795
Gustave Doulcet de Pontécoulant	Navy	5 May 1795	3 July 1795
Jean-Baptiste Robert Lindet	Navy (adjoint)	7 April 1793	13 June 1793
Jean Dalbarade	Navy and colonies	1 April 1793	1 July 1795
Pierre Marec	Navy and colonies	7 January 1795	5 May 1795
Jacques Defermon des Chapelières	Navy and colonies	5 May 1795	1 September 1795
Pierre-Claude Daunou	Navy and colonies	1 September 1795	27 October 1795
Marie-Joseph Chénier	Navy and colonies	7 October 1795	27 October 1795
Jacques Nicolas Billaud-Varenne	Official correspondence	31 July 1794	1 September 1794
Philippe-Antoine Merlin de Douai	President	5 March 1795	5 April 1795
Jean-Jacques Cambacérès	President	5 April 1795	2 August 1795
Philippe-Antoine Merlin de Douai	President	2 August 1795	1 September 1795
Jean-Jacques Cambacérès	President	1 September 1795	27 October 1795
François-Antoine de Boissy d'Anglas	Supplies	7 December 1794	5 April 1795
François Sébastien Christophe Laporte	Supplies	5 March 1795	5 May 1795
Jean-Baptiste Robert Lindet	Supplies, Finance	22 June 1793	31 July 1794
Jean-Baptiste Robert Lindet	Supplies, Finance	31 July 1794	7 October 1794
Jean-François-Bertrand Delmas	War	6 April 1793	10 July 1793
Jean-François Delacroix	War	6 April 1793	10 July 1793
Thomas-Augustin de Gasparin	War	13 June 1793	24 July 1793
Edmond Dubois-Crancé	War	7 December 1794	5 April 1795
Jean-Pierre Lacombe-Saint-Michel	War	7 February 1795	3 June 1795
François Sébastien Christophe Laporte	War	5 May 1795	3 June 1795
Claude-Antoine Blad	War	3 June 1795	3 July 1795
Gustave Doulcet de Pontécoulant	War	3 July 1795	1 September 1795
Charles-Louis Letourneur de la Manche	War	2 August 1795	27 October 1795
Antoine Claire Thibaudeau	War	1 September 1795	27 October 1795
Philippe-Antoine Merlin de Douai	War	1 September 1795	27 October 1795
Théophile Berlier	War	7 October 1795	27 October 1795
Jean Baptiste Treilhard	War and Foreign Affairs	5 May 1795	2 August 1795
François Aubry	War, Member	5 April 1795	2 August 1795

== Sources ==
- Muel, Léon (1891). Gouvernements, ministères et constitutions de la France depuis cent ans: Précis historique des révolutions, des crises ministérielles et gouvernementales, et des changements de constitutions de la France depuis 1789 jusqu'en 1890 ... Marchal et Billard.
- Zanco, Jean-Philippe (2011-11-01). Dictionnaire des ministres de la Marine (1689–1958): Kronos N° 58. SPM. ISBN 978-2-296-47238-9.
