= Ministers of the French National Convention =

French government ministry 1792–94

Ministers of the National Convention
- France; Cabinet of France
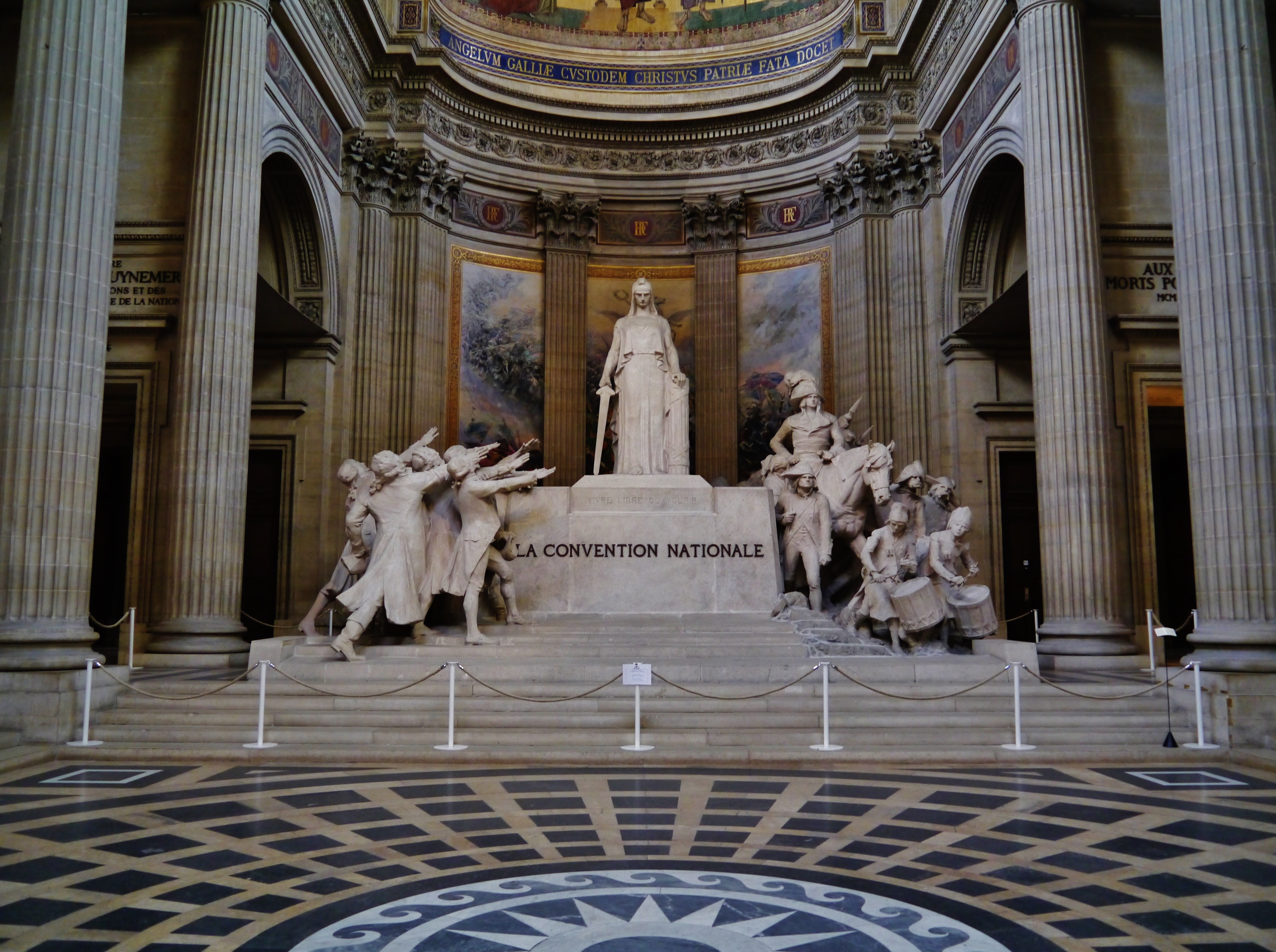
- Autel de la Convention nationale by François-Léon Sicard (1913)
- Date formed: 10 August 1792
- Date dissolved: 1 April 1794

People and organisations
- Head of state: President of the National Convention
- Head of government: National Convention (collective)
- No. of ministers: 6
- Ministers removed: 11
- Total no. of members: 17
- Member party: Maraisard; Montagnard; Girondin (1792–93)
- Status in legislature: National Convention
- Opposition party: Unopposed
- Opposition leader: N/A

History
- Election: 1792
- Legislature term: 7 September 1792 – 12 October 1795
- Predecessor: Constitutional Cabinet of Louis XVI
- Successor: Commissioners of the Committee of Public Safety

The Ministers of the French National Convention were appointed on 10 August 1792 after the French Legislative Assembly suspended King Louis XVI and revoked the ministers that he had named.

On 12 Germinal year II (1 April 1794) Lazare Carnot proposed to suppress the executive council and the six ministers, replacing the ministers with twelve Committees reporting to the Committee of Public Safety. The proposal was unanimously adopted by the National Convention.

== Ministers ==
| Portfolio | Minister | Took office | Left office | Party |
|---|---|---|---|---|
| Head of Government | National Convention | 10 August 1792 | 1 April 1794 | Independent |
| Minister of Finances | Étienne Clavière | 10 August 1792 | 13 June 1793 | Girondins |
| Minister of Finances | Louis Destournelles | 13 June 1793 | 1 April 1794 | Montagnard |
| Minister of Foreign Affairs | Pierre Lebrun-Tondu | 10 August 1792 | 21 June 1793 | Girondins |
| Minister of Foreign Affairs | François Chemin Deforgues | 21 June 1793 | 1 April 1794 | Montagnard |
| Minister of War | Joseph Servan de Gerbey | 10 August 1792 | 3 October 1792 | Girondins |
| Minister of War | Jean-Nicolas Pache | 3 October 1792 | 4 February 1793 | Montagnard |
| Minister of War | Pierre Riel de Beurnonville | 4 February 1793 | 4 April 1793 | Independent |
| Minister of War | Jean Baptiste Bouchotte | 4 April 1793 | 1 April 1794 | Montagnard |
| Minister of the Interior | Jean-Marie Roland, vicomte de la Platière | 10 August 1792 | 14 March 1793 | Girondins |
| Minister of the Interior | Dominique Joseph Garat | 14 March 1793 | 20 August 1793 | Girondins |
| Minister of the Interior | Jules-François Paré | 20 August 1793 | 1 April 1794 | Marais |
| Minister of Justice | Georges Danton | 10 August 1792 | 10 October 1792 | Montagnard |
| Minister of Justice | Dominique Joseph Garat | 10 October 1792 | 20 March 1793 | Girondins |
| Minister of Justice | Louis-Jérôme Gohier | 20 March 1793 | 1 April 1794 | Marais |
| Minister of the Navy and Colonies | Gaspard Monge | 10 August 1792 | 10 April 1793 | Montagnard |
| Minister of the Navy and Colonies | Jean Dalbarade | 10 April 1793 | 1 April 1794 | Independent |
