= Denis Toussaint Lesage =

Deputy to the National Convention for Eure-et-Loir
- In office 1792–1795

Member of the Council of Five Hundred for Seine
- In office 1795–1796

Personal details
- Born: 15 August 1758 Chartres, France
- Died: 9 June 1796 (aged 37) Paris, France
- Occupation: lawyer

Denis Toussaint Lesage (Chartres 15 August 1758 – Paris 9 June 1796) was a deputy who represented Eure-et-Loir in the French National Convention and Seine in the Council of Five Hundred.

== Convention ==
A lawyer at the time of the French Revolution, he became president of the district court of Chartres. He was elected to the Convention by the departement of Eure-et-Loir on 5 September 1792, the fifth of nine deputies returned, and joined the Girondin faction. On 27 September 1792, he was named a member of the Commission of Six, charged with reporting on the state of the city of Paris and of bringing forward means of maintaining a watch on secret agitators and punishing incitement to murder. On 13 October he was appointed to the Committee of Division, which was working on the drafting of new administrative boundaries in France, and on 10 January 1793 he became secretary of the Convention.

At the trial of Louis XVI, he voted to find the king guilty, as well as for this judgement to be ratified by the people, and for his death but also for the 'Mailhe amendment' – i.e.for a delay, and for a reprieve. On 6 February, when the Convention was considering a proposal to distribute three million francs to the departements for the relief of hardship and poverty, he successfully moved that the amount be doubled to six million. On 17 February 1793 he spoke in defence of General Georges Félix de Wimpffen, who was accused by two Jewish citizens of the departement of Moselle of having communicated with the Austrian commander during the siege of Thionville in 1792. On 10 March he brought forward proposals for establishing a special tribunal, which were not adopted, and on 13 March he opposed the establishment of new Revolutionary Tribunal. On 11 April, he was sent as a representant en mission to Orne and on 2 June an arrest warrant was issued for him he and he was recalled to Paris. He fled, and on 28 July he was proclaimed a traitor. Together with other Girondin deputies, he took refuge in Caen, where they attempted to regroup under the leadership of Jérôme Pétion de Villeneuve. Together with Charles Jean Marie Barbaroux, Lesage served as secretary to this group.

== After Thermidor ==
After the 9 Thermidor, he was recalled to the Convention (19 Ventôse Year III), where he denounced both 'crazed royalism and the fury of terrorism'. In April 1795 he was appointed to the 'Commission of Seven', (subsequently expanded to eleven), charged by the Convention with devising means of bringing the Constitution of 1793 into effect. Instead, the commission drafted the entirely new Constitution of the Year III, which was laid before the Convention in June, adopted in August and confirmed by referendum in September. He became a member of the Committee of Public Safety and took an interest in military affairs during the War in the Vendée, placing Lazare Hoche and Jean-Baptiste Annibal Aubert du Bayet at the head of the armies of the Republic in the region. In the Convention, Lesage also advocated bringing Charles-Gilbert Romme and his associates to justice before the criminal court of the Seine departement, and opposed proposals for a union of France and Belgium.

On 15 October 1795 (23 Vendémiaire Year IV) he was elected to the Council of Five Hundred where he made his mark principally in defending General Francisco de Miranda, who was suspected of conspiring with royalists against the Directory, and of plotting a military coup. He died during a session of the Council.
