= Joseph Eschassériaux =

French politician

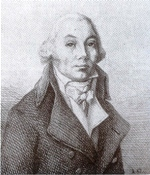
Joseph Eschassériaux (1753-1824)

Joseph Eschassériaux known as 'Eschassériaux the elder', (born 29 July 1753 at Corme-Royal, died 24 February 1824 at Thénac (Charente-Maritime)), was a French politician of the revolutionary period. He was the older brother of René Eschassériaux and father of Camille Eschassériaux, both of whom also had political careers.

== Before 1792 ==
Joseph Eschassériaux studied law in the town of Saintes where his family were long-established aldermen. In 1775, at the age of 22, he began practising as a lawyer at the parlement of Bordeaux. In 1785 he became President of the Maronne tribunal, a post he held until the French Revolution. He became commander of the National Guard in his home town of Corme-Royal. In 1790 he was elected to the post of administrator of the district of Saintes and then joined the administration of the département of Charente-Inférieure. In 1791 he was elected as a député for Charente-Inférieure to the Legislative Assembly. He was elected fourth out of six seats, with 243 out of 424 votes. He took his seat with the centrist majority of the Assembly.

== 1793-1799 ==
On 5 September 1792 he was re-elected to the National Convention taking the third of eleven seats with 379 votes out of 575. He took his seats with the Mountain and, as a member of the Agriculture and Commerce Committee, was noted for his assiduous work producing reports on a range of subjects such as union with Belgium, the provision of basic goods and the work of the police. At the trial of Louis XVI he voted for the king's death. In August 1973 his brother René, who had less radical views, also became a member of the Convention.

During the Thermidorian Reaction Eschassériaux declared himself against Robespierre. Four days later, on 13 Thermidor (31 July 1794), he was elected to the Committee of Public Safety as Robespierre's supporters were removed, with the support of his friend Barère. He remained in the Committee for two months, taking charge of commerce and the supply of goods. As a left Thermidorian, he was opposed to the growing reaction and defending the continued existence of the political clubs. He left his post on 16 Vendémiaire Year III (7 October 1794) and remained aligned with moderate republicans. On 15 Vendémiaire Year IV (7 October 1795) he came back onto the Committee of Public Safety, just after the crushing of the Royalist insurrection. He took charge of the same portfolio he had managed during his previous term of office.

That same month, October 1795, he was elected to the Council of Five Hundred by Charente-Inférieure, as well as by fifteen other départements. He was re-elected throughout the period of the Directory and became secretary of the Council in May 1796. As he had done under the Convention, he prepared reports on a number of topics, principally to do with administrative and colonial questions, including Saint-Domingue. He supported the constitutional clubs, which had succeeded the revolutionary political clubs, and remained hostile to the Catholic Church. In 1797 he married Louise, the daughter of Gaspard Monge and Marie-Catherine Huart, with whom he had children. Their son Camille Eschassériaux was a député under the July Monarchy.

== Later career and retirement ==
Eschassériaux enthusiastically supported the Coup of 18 Brumaire and became a member of the Tribunat, where he served for seven years. In 1806 Napoléon named him chargé d'affaires for the Republic of Valais, and then Minister Plenipotentiary to the Principality of Lucca and Piombino until 1809. He was awarded the Légion d'honneur and was later made a Baron of the Empire in 1810.

On his return from Lucca, he devoted himself to writing about history. He retired to Saintes in 1814 but signed the Acte additionnel supporting Napoleon's return during the Hundred Days. In 1816, with the Bourbon Restoration he went into exile as a regicide. He fled first to Courtrai and then to Huy, but after just three years of exile he was given permission by Louis XVIII to return to France. He retired to his property at Thénac where he died in 1824 at the age of seventy.
