= Claude-Antoine-Auguste Blad =

Claude-Antoine-Auguste Blad (born Brest 20 August 1764, died Toulon 8 December 1802), was a politician of the French revolutionary era.

== Early life ==
The son of a pharmacist in the port of Brest, Blad was employed in the naval administration in the city before the revolution. He was secretary of the local patriotic club and became public prosecutor of the commune in 1791. Blad was elected sixth on the list of deputies from Finistère to the National Convention on 6 September 1792, with 264 votes out of 417.

== Committee of Public Safety ==
During the Trial of Louis XVI he voted for the people to decide the king's fate, and for the death penalty to be suspended until all of the royal family had been expelled from France. On 6 June 1793 he was one of the deputies who signed a protest against the Insurrection of 31 May – 2 June 1793 and was therefore one of the seventy-three for whom arrest warrants were issued. On 3 October he was arrested and spent several months in prison.

Freed from prison after the Thermidorean reaction, he resumed his seat in the Convention on 18 Frimaire Year III (8 December 1794). He was named secretary of the Convention on 5 March 1795 and appointed to the Committee of public safety on 3 June 1795. He opposed the Jacobins, speaking against the defence of Laurent Lecointre on 30 March, and on 19 May joined the deputies denouncing the actions of the Committee of public safety before Thermidor. Turning to Louis-Gustave Doulcet de Pontécoulant who was defending Robert Lindet, he cried out 'Do the eighteen months of their tyranny count for nothing with you?' He also rebuked Jeanbon Saint André for having ruined the navy. He also joined the other deputies from Brest in denouncing Joseph Donzé de Verteuil, the public prosecutor of the city's revolutionary tribunal. He was sent as a représentant en mission to the armée de l'Ouest with Tallien. At the time of the Quiberon expedition, after the Republican victory, he demanded that the lives of émigrés aged less than sixteen be spared, but the Convention nevertheless passed a decree condemning them.

== The Council of Five Hundred ==
He stood down from the Committee of Public Safety on 13 Vendemiaire Year IV (5 October 1795). The Convention had decided that two thirds of the seats in the Council of Five Hundred, constituted under the 1795 constitution, were to be reserved for former members of the Convention itself, and on 4 Brumaire Year IV (26 October 1795)he was chosen as one of the deputies to serve in the new body. In the Council he sat on the benches of the right, suspected of royalism.

On 19 January 1796 he protested against the reorganisation of the navy by the Directory. On 18 March 1797 he presented a report on deportees from Saint Domingue who were being detained in France. In his report he opposed a decree by the Directory which placed their fate in the hands of a commission, arguing instead that they should be brought before the tribunal of Charente-Inférieure.

When his term as a Council came to an end in May 1798, he left political life. He was appointed deputy commissioner of the navy at Toulon in 1800 and died in that city in December 1802.
