= Louis Grégoire Deschamps Destournelles =

French politician

- Born: 31 May 1744; Rouen, Haute-Normandie, France
- Died: 27 July 1795 (aged 51); Paris, France
- Occupations: Administrator, politician
- Known for: Minister of Finance

Louis Grégoire Deschamps Destournelles (31 May 1744 – 27 July 1795) was a French politician who was Minister of Finance during the French Revolution. He was imprisoned during the Reign of Terror, and died soon after being released.

== Early years ==
Louis Grégoire Deschamps was born in the parish of Saint-Eloi in Rouen, Haute-Normandie, on 31 May 1744. His ancestors were notable Huguenots who probably originated in Normandy and settled first in La Rochelle and then in Bergerac, Dordogne. His grandfather Jean Deschamps (1667–1730) had emigrated from Bergerac after the revocation of the Edict of Nantes, and after studying in Geneva had become a pastor in Mecklenburg and then Brandenburg. His parents were Gabriel Deschamps (1703–1778) and Marie Eyma.

Deschamps added "Destournelles" to his family name to distinguish himself from his brothers. He completed his education at the age of fifteen. From classical authors, he had gained a passion for liberty and admiration of republican principles.

== Military service and early career ==
He incurred debts that he could not pay from his allowance, and engaged in the army for the duration of the war with Hanover to earn the money, despite an offer from his parents to pay the debts. He returned after peace was made. He then joined the administration with a lucrative position as a tax collector. Before the age of thirty he had settled in Paris with a position in the central tax administration.

== Revolution ==
At the start of the French Revolution Destournelles played an active role in the political events. He became a member of the battalion of Filles-Saint-Thomas. When he found that the leaders were supporting the ancien regime on the pretext of patriotism he broke with them, and as a result lost his official positions. He became one of the first members of the Jacobins. After the events of 10 August 1792, Destournelles was named commander of the national guard, elector and then municipal officer. On 1 May 1793 he gave the funeral oration of Lazowski to the commune of Paris.

== Minister of Finance ==
Destournelles was appointed Minister of Finance (Contributions et Revenus publics) on 13 June 1793. He replaced Étienne Clavière, the last Minister of Finance named by Louis XVI. A true republican, he took possession of a magnificent house with many servants. He was paid a handsome salary, but did not increase his normal expenditures and gave the excess to good causes. He retained all the employees of his office apart from those who were totally hostile to the revolution. Due to this he was denounced as being an instrument of the moderate faction. At this time the Committee of Public Safety was becoming increasingly powerful, and the ministers were becoming secondary agents.

== Dismissal and death ==
On 12 Germinal year II (1 April 1794) Lazare Carnot proposed to suppress the executive council and the six ministers, replacing the ministers with twelve Committees reporting to the Committee of Public Safety. The proposal was unanimously adopted by the National Convention. During the Terror (5 September 1793 – 28 July 1794) Destournelles tried in vain to defend one of his brothers, but was arrested himself. He was kept in prison until 9 Thermidor (27 July 1794). Convinced that he would not escape execution by the revolutionaries, he took poison during his captivity. The dose did not kill him immediately, but hastened his death. Destournelles died in Passy, today the 17th arrondissement of Paris, on 27 July 1795.
