= Jean Dalbarade =

French naval officer

- Born: 31 August 1743; Biarritz, Pyrénées-Atlantiques, France
- Died: 31 December 1819 (aged 76); Saint-Jean-de-Luz, Pyrénées-Atlantiques,
- Occupations: Naval officer, politician
- Known for: Minister of the Navy and Colonies

Jean Dalbarade (or d'Albarade; 31 August 1743 – 31 December 1819) was a French naval officer who became an extremely successful corsair. In his career at sea he captured many enemy vessels, and was often wounded. He was decorated by King Louis XVI. Dalbarade became Minister of the Navy and Colonies (1793–95) during the French Revolution, at the height of the Reign of Terror. He was ineffective and indecisive in this position. He commanded the port of Lorient for two years, then was dismissed and soon after retired from the navy.

== Early years ==
Jean Dalbarade was born in Biarritz, Pyrénées-Atlantiques, on 31 August 1743. Of Basque origin, growing up beside the sea, he naturally became a sailor, as did his younger brothers. He sailed as a corsair during the Seven Years' War (1754–1763). At the age of sixteen, on 14 March 1759 he joined the royal ship Outarde as an apprentice seaman in a voyage to Quebec. On 2 October 1760 he joined the corsair Labourt from Saint-Jean-de-Luz as a lieutenant. The ship had 18 guns and a crew of 207. In the campaign that followed thirteen prizes were taken. Dalbarade was badly wounded in the head. He then joined Minerve, armed with four cannon and 14 swivels, and then was made first lieutenant on Triomphante, a frigate with a crew of 160.

After the war, Dalbarade joined the merchant marine service. He served again in the royal navy during the American Revolutionary War (1775–1783). As commander of the corsair frigate Duchesse de Chartres he captured the British ship General Dalling. He was wounded by a bullet while boarding the Swallow, and was taken prisoner by the British. Dalbarade was freed in 1780 and took command of the privateer Aigle from Saint-Malo, with which he seized several ships. In 1781 he was condemned to prison for having debauched some naval crews. Apart from minor misdeeds like this, and from often acting more like a pirate than a corsair, Dalbarde proved himself an intrepid sailor. He was made a Knight of Saint Louis in 1787 by King Louis XVI. Dalbarade was promoted to Captain (capitaine de vaisseau) in January 1792. In April 1792 he was given the command of a royal frigate.

== Minister ==
Dalbarade was assistant minister of the Navy and Colonies from 1 March 1793 to 10 April 1793. He was appointed Minister of the Navy and Colonies on 10 April 1793. At the time to refuse the position would have meant imprisonment or death. As a minister he was close to the Montagnards but achieved nothing, and was suspicious and jealous of other talented people. Léon Guérin wrote that they needed an administrator and appointed a pirate. Dalbarade was in charge of the department of Navy and Colonies for about 27 months during the Reign of Terror. He was ordered to deport disobedient priests to Guiana, but delayed their departure indefinitely.

Throughout 1793 the French Republic was involved in total war with the rest of Europe. The priority was to defend land threats, ether internal or external. Naval forces were used to suppress land rebellions, and naval arsenals to supply the army. In May 1793 the combined naval forces of Spain and Britain arrived off Toulon. The commander, Trogoff, asked for instructions from Dalbarade and the executive council, with no success. Eventually Dalbarade wrote telling him to avoid conflict unless he was completely sure that he was equal in force to the enemy. From 29 August to 17 December 1793 the port of Toulon was occupied by an Anglo-Spanish force. The port was recovered by forces under General Jacques François Dugommier, but the British burned much of the French navy before retiring.

The Quibéron mutinies took place in September 1793. Vice-admiral Morard de Galles, based on Brest with a fleet of twenty ships of the line and four frigates, received orders to cruise the dangerous waters between the islands of Groix and Belle-Isle to prevent the British from assisting the royalists in Brittany and the Vendée. He and Kerguelen, commander of one of the divisions of the fleet, proposed to Dalbarade that a better way to prevent the enemy from considering a descent on the coasts of France would be to go out and cruise. The season of bad weather had arrived, and the ships were forced to take refuge in the bay of Quiberon. The crews wanted to return to Brest because they had no chance of taking prizes, had been eating almost nothing but salt meat for four months and were poorly clothed. The fall of Toulon provided a pretext for returning to Brest, which was equally vulnerable to the British. Unable to maintain discipline, Morard de Galles ordered the fleet back to Brest. Jean Bon Saint-André was sent to Brest, where he initiated a purge of the officers involved.

The British took advantage of the revolution to take most of the French overseas possessions other than Senegal. In 1793 the French lost 15 ships of the line and 18 frigates, and these losses continued into 1794. Dalbarade had to recall the colonial commissioners and governors who had been sent by the National Assembly, most of whom were arrested. He managed to maintain the commissioners sent to Santo Domingo at the end of 1792 by Gaspard Monge. On 27 September 1793 Sonthonnax proclaimed the abolition of slavery on the whole of Santo Domingo, including the Spanish portion. This led to the abolition of slavery by the Convention of 4 February 1794 and the revolt of Toussaint Louverture on 6 May 1794.

On 12 Germinal year II (1 April 1794) Lazare Carnot proposed to suppress the executive council and the six ministers, replacing the ministers with twelve Committees reporting to the Committee of Public Safety. The proposal was unanimously adopted by the National Convention. Dalbarade remained at his post with the new title of Commissaire en charge de la Marine et des Colonies. Guadeloupe fell in April 1794. In July 1794 the island was recaptured thanks to the bold initiative of Victor Hugues, a former merchant captain. Dalbarade managed to obtain funding to start a program to build replacement vessels. He continued as Commissaire of the Navy and Colonies until 1 July 1795.

== Later career ==
Dalbarade left the ministry on 1 July 1795, and the next day was named military commander of the port of Lorient, a post he held for twenty five months. On the night of 10–11 Florèal year VI (May 1798) a large fire caused turmoil in the town of Lorient. The fire, which raged on board the naval vessel Quatorze Juillet, threatened to spread to the town. Through prompt action the town was saved, but the ship was completely destroyed. Dalbarade was found unfit to command by a court-martial, but was allowed to appeal. On 19 Brumaire year VIII the council of maritime law, sitting in Paris, acquitted Jean d'Albarade from the charges of negligence.

Despite this vindication, d'Albarade did not dare ask for work. He was prematurely aged, and the wounds he had received during his active service often gave him great pain. He finally left the navy on 1 Vendémiaire year IX (22 September 1800) and retired to Saint Jean-de-Luz. Later he wrote two letters to Citizen Bonaparte, First Consul, asking for employment suitable to his experience and knowledge, but these went unanswered. After the first Bourbon Restoration, King Louis XVIII granted him an annual pension of four thousand francs on 8 October 1814. This was confirmed during the Hundred Days of 1815 when Napoleon returned from exile. He was also made a knight of the Legion of Honor.

Dalbarade died in Saint-Jean-de-Luz, Pyrénées-Atlantiques, on 31 December 1819.
