= François Sébastien Christophe Laporte =

French politician (1760–1823)

François Sébastien Christophe Delaporte, (known as Laporte after 1792), (b. Belfort 15 September 1760, d. Belfort 25 March 1823), was a politician at the time of the French Revolution.

== During the Revolution ==
A solicitor in Belfort, François Christophe Sébastien Delaporte was elected from the département of Haut-Rhin first to the National Legislative Assembly in 1791 and then to the Convention in 1792. After returning from work as a représentant en mission to the départements of Meurthe, Moselle and Bas-Rhin, he was in Paris for the trial of Louis XVI, voting for his execution.

In April 1793, he was sent as représentant en mission to the Army of the Ardennes, but he was not able to get along with his three colleagues Deville, Hentz and Milhaud. He was then sent on a new mission with Jacques Reverchon to put down the Revolt of Lyon against the National Convention. After the city surrendered, he reported the judgements of the Revolutionary Tribunal to the Convention, but left the task of repression to Jean-Marie Collot d'Herbois and Joseph Fouché. He was then sent to the Army of the Alps in Nice.

After the Thermidorean Reaction (27 July 1794), he was in charge of applying the policies of the Thermidorian Convention in Lyon. He disarmed the Jacobin Club, and arrested the leaders of the Terror, with whom he had recently worked to arrest and condemn the Federalists of the city.

On his return to the Convention, he criticised those who “denounced as aristocrats all those who are not terrorists.” He was elected to the Committee of General Security and then to the Committee of Public Safety. He was a strong defender of the law on religious freedom, to calm religious quarrels. During the Revolt of 1 Prairial Year III (20 May 1795) and the royalist uprising of 13 Vendémiaire Year IV (5 October 1795), he was one of the députés leading the armed forces of the Convention.

Under the Directory, the département of Haut-Rhin returned him to the Council of Five Hundred. In 1796, he resigned to work in military supplies. Some sources report that he was involved in some kind of misappropriation of funds with the army, though he managed to clear his name. According to the “Dictionnaire de la Révolution française”, this was another individual who happened to have the same name.

== After the revolution ==
Under the Consulate and the Empire, he had no public function, but worked as a lawyer in Lure. After the Bourbon restoration he was not subject to any sanctions and was allowed to live in peace, despite being a regicide.
