= Théophile Berlier =

French jurist and politician

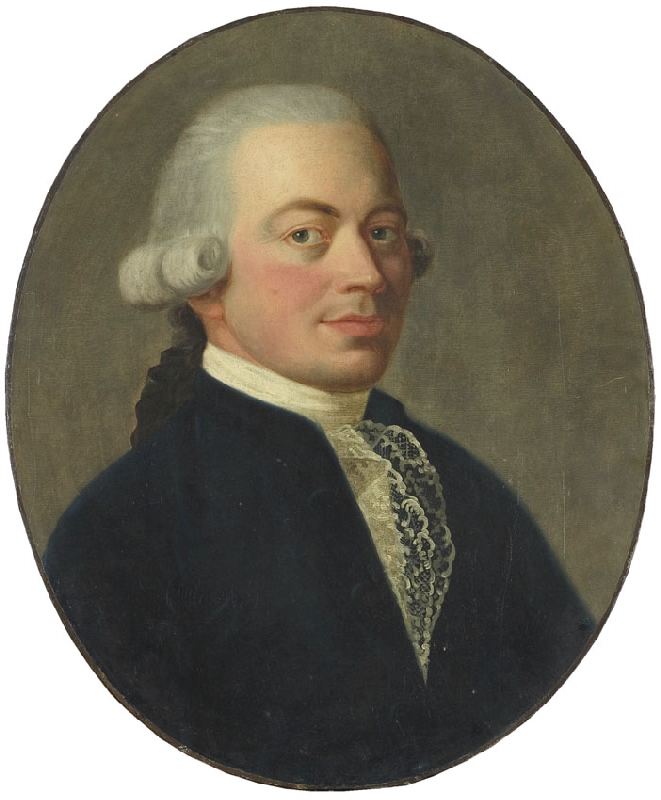
- Portrait of Berlier at the musée des Beaux-Arts de Dijon

President of the National Convention
- In office 23 September – 8 October 1795
- Preceded by: Marie-Joseph Chénier
- Succeeded by: Pierre-Charles-Louis Baudin

Personal details
- Born: 1 February 1761 Dijon, Kingdom of France
- Died: 12 September 1844 (aged 83) Dijon, France

Théophile Berlier (1 February 1761 in Dijon – 12 September 1844 in Dijon) was a French jurist and politician, who was a member of the National Convention from 1792 until 1795.

== Bibliography ==
- Thomas, Joseph (1892), Universal pronouncing dictionary of biography and mythology (Aa, van der – Hyperius), vol. 1, Philadelphia: J.B. Lippincott, p. 335
