= Corme-Royal =

- Commune
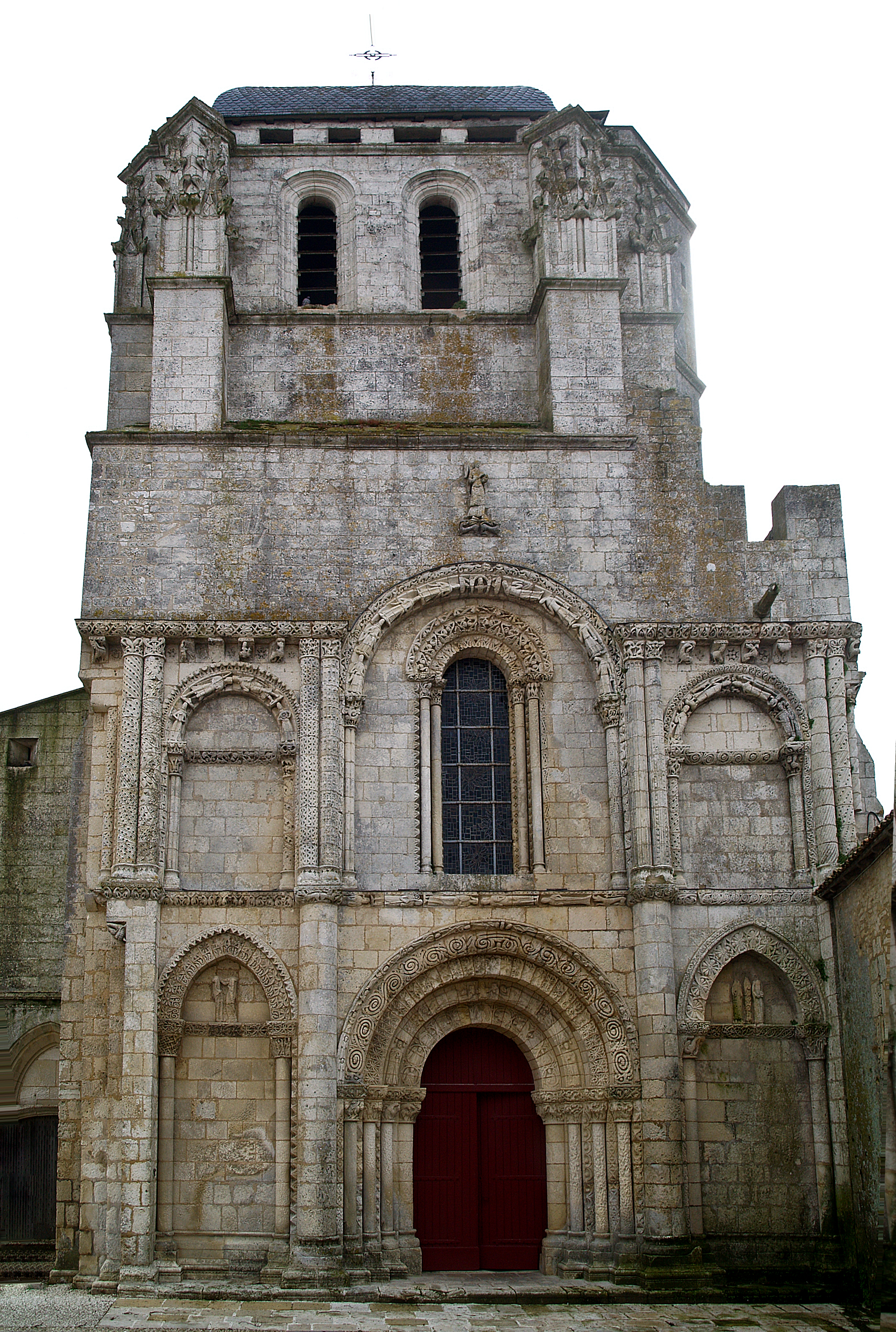
- Church of St. Nazaire

- Coat of arms
- Location of Corme-Royal
- Location within France Location within Nouvelle-Aquitaine
- Coordinates: 45°44′48″N 0°48′40″W
- Country: France
- Region: Nouvelle-Aquitaine
- Department: Charente-Maritime
- Arrondissement: Saintes
- Canton: Thénac
- Intercommunality: CA Saintes

Government
  - Mayor (2020–2026): Alain Margat
- Area^{1}: 27.18 km^{2} (10.49 sq mi)
- Highest elevation: 44 m (144 ft)
- Lowest elevation: 15 m (49 ft)
- Population (2023): 1,997
  - Density: 73.47/km^{2} (190.3/sq mi)
- Time zone: UTC+01:00 (CET)
  - Summer (DST): UTC+02:00 (CEST)
- INSEE/Postal code: 17120 /17600
- ^{1} French Land Register data, which excludes lakes, ponds, glaciers > 1 km^{2} (0.386 sq mi or 247 acres) and river estuaries.

Corme-Royal (French pronunciation: [kɔʁm ʁwajal]) is a commune in the Charente-Maritime department in southwestern France.

== Population ==
Historical population
Year	Pop.	±% p.a.
1968	863	—
1975	833	−0.50%
1982	965	+2.12%
1990	1,204	+2.80%
1999	1,344	+1.23%
2007	1,538	+1.70%
2012	1,657	+1.50%
2017	1,839	+2.11%
2023	1,997	+1.38%
Source: INSEE

== See also ==
- Communes of the Charente-Maritime department
