= Pierre Marec =

- Born: 31 March 1759; Brest, Finistère, France
- Died: 23 January 1828 (aged 68); Paris, France
- Occupations: Lawyer, politician
- Known for: National Convention member

Pierre Marec (31 March 1759 – 23 January 1828) was a French lawyer who became a member of the National Convention and a member of the Council of Five Hundred during the French Revolution.

== Early years ==
Pierre Marec was born in Brest, Finistère, on 31 March 1759. When the revolution began in 1789 he was a control clerk in the navy at Brest. In 1790 he became deputy attorney of the commune, then general secretary of the department of Finistère. On 14 September 1791 he was elected deputy for Finistère in the Legislative Assembly, but was not called upon to serve there.

== Deputy ==
Marec was reelected on 7 September 1792 to represent Finistère in the National Convention. Marec sat among the moderates. He wrote a decree for the expenses of the Navy department, and handled several technical issues competently. At the trial of King Louis XVI he supported the appeal and opposed the death penalty. On the third nominal appeal he voted for imprisonment of Louis during the war and perpetual exile afterwards. Marec was a member of the Finance committee and the committee of the Navy and Colonies. He addressed the Convention several times, mostly on commercial issues.

At the Thermidorian Reaction (27 July 1794) Marec spoke against Robespierre. He joined the Committee of Public Safety, and moved to release the Duchess of Orleans, Prince de Conti and other suspects. He distinguished himself among the opponents of the revolt of 1 Prairial Year III. He denounced Joseph François Laignelot and opposed the establishment of a new maximum.

== Later career ==
Marec was elected to the Council of Five Hundred on 22 Vendémiaire year IV for three departments. He continued to press for reforms in naval recruitment. Under the First French Empire he was appointed inspector of the port of Genoa, which he held until the convention of 23 April 1814. During the Hundred Days, in April 1815 he was named inspector of the port of Bordeaux, but did not take up the position. After the second Bourbon Restoration he retired in 1818. In 1820 he was given the Cross of Saint-Louis.

Pierre Marec died in Paris on 23 January 1828. His son, ThéophiIe-Marie-Finistère Marec (1792-1851), was director of naval personnel in 1848.
