= François Aubry =

- Born: 12 December 1747; Paris, France
- Died: 17 July 1798 (aged 50); Demerara, Dutch Guiana
- Occupations: Soldier, politician
- Known for: Member of the National Convention

François Aubry (French pronunciation: [fʁɑ̃swa obʁi]; 12 December 1747 – 17 July 1798) was a French soldier who became a member of the National Convention of France and the Council of Five Hundred during the French Revolution. At first a moderate supporter of the revolution, he moved towards a monarchical position and worked to overthrow the Directory. When the Directory seized power, he was arrested and deported to Cayenne. He escaped, but died in Dutch Guiana soon after.

== Early years ==
François Aubry was born in Paris on 12 December 1747. He joined the army, and in 1789 was a captain of artillery. He declared his support for the ideas of the revolution. He was appointed mayor of Nîmes in 1790.

== Girondin member ==
On 6 September 1792 he was elected a member of the National Convention for the department of Gard. Aubry was dispatched on a mission to the south of France. At the siege of Toulon he fell out with Napoleone Buonaparte, since he disagreed with his plan of attack. On returning to the convention, he attended the trial of King Louis XVI. He declared that Louis was guilty of conspiracy against freedom and attacks against the general security of the State, and voted in favor of the death penalty. On 3 August 1793 Aubry decreed that in all towns all the bells except one would be available to the Minister of War. Aubry signed a protest against the Insurrection of 31 May – 2 June 1793, and was arrested and detained until 9 Thermidor (27 July 1794).

== Later career ==
After 9 Thermidor (27 July 1794), Aubry returned to the Convention and succeeded Carnot in the Committee of Public Safety for military affairs. In this position he dismissed many officers accused of terrorism, including Massena and Bonaparte. He took a very active part in suppressing the revolt of 1 Prairial Year III (20 May 1795). Accused on that basis at the meeting of 14 Thermidor Year III (1 August 1795), he left the Committee and allied himself closely with the Clichy monarchical club, where he dominated the counter-revolutionary movement and became the most influential member.

Aubry was among the members of the Convention who entered the Council of Five Hundred on 23 Vendémiaire year IV (15 October 1795). An arrest warrant was issued against him for his unconstitutional attitude on 13 Vendémiaire (5 October 1795), but was not executed. He supported Armand-Gaston Camus's proposed general amnesty. He opposed the law which declared nobles and relatives of emigrants ineligible for public office, and actively worked to overthrow the Directory.

After the coup of 18 Fructidor (4 September 1797) he was arrested and transported to Rochefort, from where he was shipped to Cayenne. He escaped from Cayenne in a small boat with Jean-Charles Pichegru and others, and landed in Demerara, Dutch Guiana. He died there soon after on 17 July 1798.

== Sources ==
- Robert, Adolphe; Cougny, Gaston (1891). "AUBRY, François". Dictionnaire des parlementaires français de 1789 à 1889.
