= Vendémiaire =

First month of the French Republican calendar

Vendémiaire (French pronunciation: [vɑ̃demjɛʁ]) was the first month in the French Republican calendar. The month was named after the Occitan word vendemiaire 'grape harvester'.

Vendémiaire was the first month of the autumn quarter (mois d'automne). It started on the day of the autumnal equinox, which fell between 22 September and 24 September, inclusive. It thus ended between 21 October and 23 October, and was the season of the vintage in the wine districts of northern France. It follows the Sansculottides of the past year and precedes Brumaire.

Year: 3
Month: Vendémiaire
Year: III

Day of the 10-day
week (décade)
Primidi
Duodi
Tridi
Quartidi
Quintidi
Sextidi
Septidi
Octidi
Nonidi
Décadi

décade 1
1	Monday; 22 September 1794
2	Tuesday; 23 September 1794
3	Wednesday; 24 September 1794
4	Thursday; 25 September 1794
5	Friday; 26 September 1794
6	Saturday; 27 September 1794
7	Sunday; 28 September 1794
8	Monday; 29 September 1794
9	Tuesday; 30 September 1794
10	Wednesday; 1 October 1794

décade 2
11	Thursday; 2 October 1794
12	Friday; 3 October 1794
13	Saturday; 4 October 1794
14	Sunday; 5 October 1794
15	Monday; 6 October 1794
16	Tuesday; 7 October 1794
17	Wednesday; 8 October 1794
18	Thursday; 9 October 1794
19	Friday; 10 October 1794
20	Saturday; 11 October 1794

décade 3
21	Sunday; 12 October 1794
22	Monday; 13 October 1794
23	Tuesday; 14 October 1794
24	Wednesday; 15 October 1794
25	Thursday; 16 October 1794
26	Friday; 17 October 1794
27	Saturday; 18 October 1794
28	Sunday; 19 October 1794
29	Monday; 20 October 1794
30	Tuesday; 21 October 1794

Decimal time – 10 h/day
Paris
9h34m34s

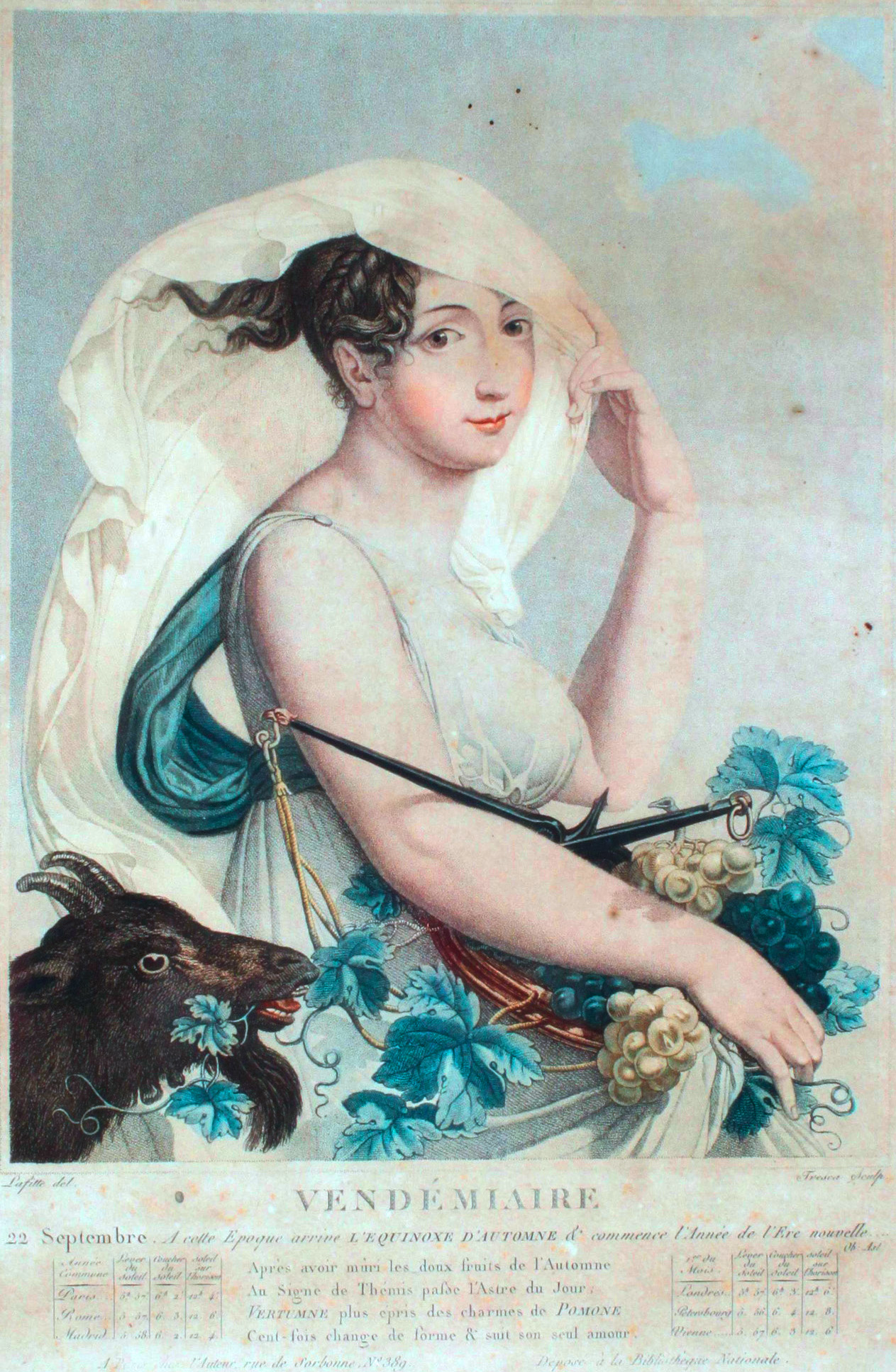
Vendémiaire

22:16:06
Time of day - 24 h/day
Greenwich

Conversion between Republican and Gregorian calendar for the years I - XIV

Year: 1
Month: Vendémiaire
Year: I

Day of the 10-day
week (décade)
Primidi
Duodi
Tridi
Quartidi
Quintidi
Sextidi
Septidi
Octidi
Nonidi
Décadi

décade 1
1	Saturday; 22 September 1792
2	Sunday; 23 September 1792
3	Monday; 24 September 1792
4	Tuesday; 25 September 1792
5	Wednesday; 26 September 1792
6	Thursday; 27 September 1792
7	Friday; 28 September 1792
8	Saturday; 29 September 1792
9	Sunday; 30 September 1792
10	Monday; 1 October 1792

décade 2
11	Tuesday; 2 October 1792
12	Wednesday; 3 October 1792
13	Thursday; 4 October 1792
14	Friday; 5 October 1792
15	Saturday; 6 October 1792
16	Sunday; 7 October 1792
17	Monday; 8 October 1792
18	Tuesday; 9 October 1792
19	Wednesday; 10 October 1792
20	Thursday; 11 October 1792

décade 3
21	Friday; 12 October 1792
22	Saturday; 13 October 1792
23	Sunday; 14 October 1792
24	Monday; 15 October 1792
25	Tuesday; 16 October 1792
26	Wednesday; 17 October 1792
27	Thursday; 18 October 1792
28	Friday; 19 October 1792
29	Saturday; 20 October 1792
30	Sunday; 21 October 1792

Decimal time – 10 h/day
Paris
9:27:84

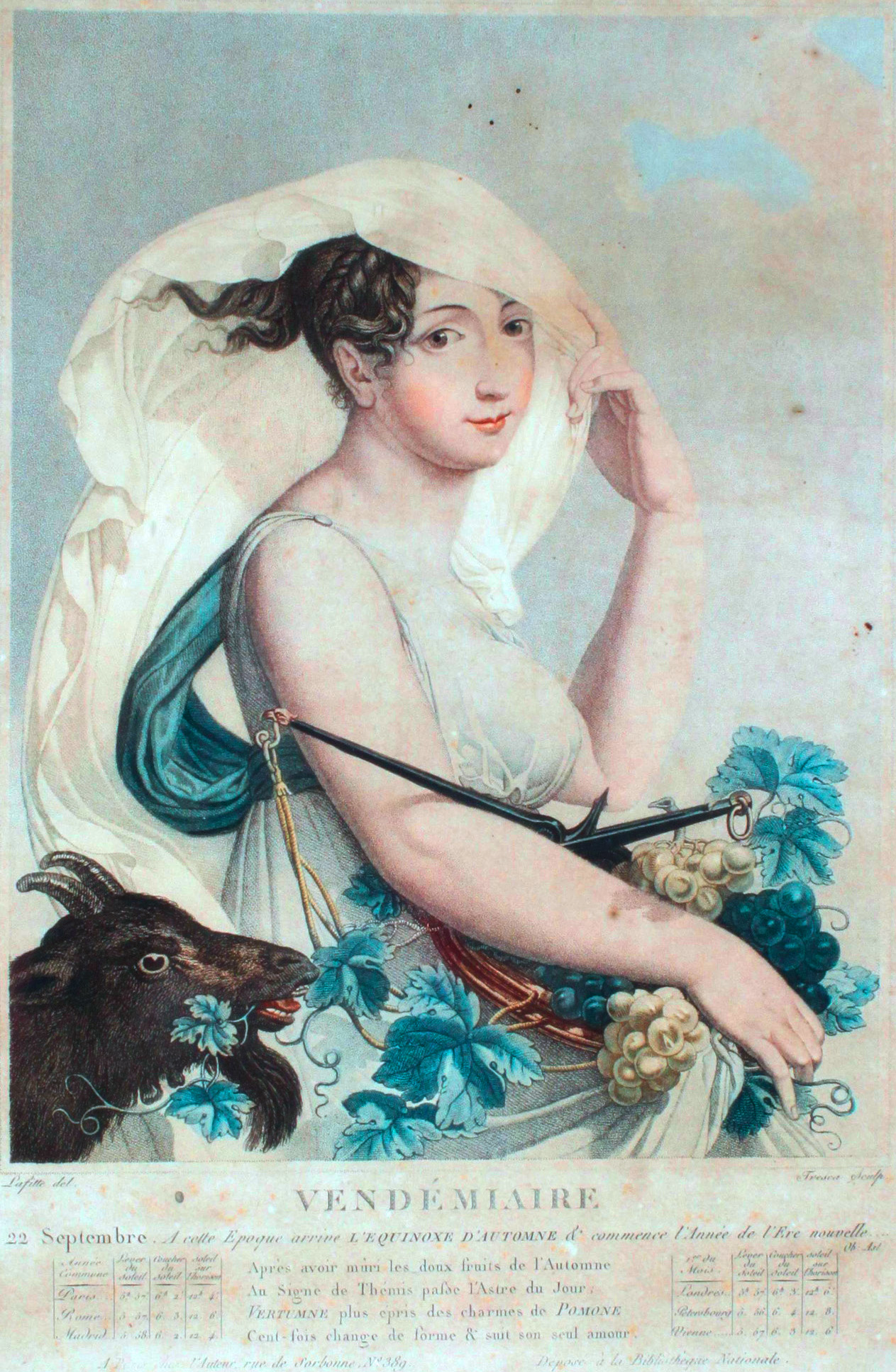
Vendémiaire

22:16:06
Time of day - 24 h/day
Greenwich

Year: 2
Month: Vendémiaire
Year: II

Day of the 10-day
week (décade)
Primidi
Duodi
Tridi
Quartidi
Quintidi
Sextidi
Septidi
Octidi
Nonidi
Décadi

décade 1
1	Sunday; 22 September 1793
2	Monday; 23 September 1793
3	Tuesday; 24 September 1793
4	Wednesday; 25 September 1793
5	Thursday; 26 September 1793
6	Friday; 27 September 1793
7	Saturday; 28 September 1793
8	Sunday; 29 September 1793
9	Monday; 30 September 1793
10	Tuesday; 1 October 1793

décade 2
11	Wednesday; 2 October 1793
12	Thursday; 3 October 1793
13	Friday; 4 October 1793
14	Saturday; 5 October 1793
15	Sunday; 6 October 1793
16	Monday; 7 October 1793
17	Tuesday; 8 October 1793
18	Wednesday; 9 October 1793
19	Thursday; 10 October 1793
20	Friday; 11 October 1793

décade 3
21	Saturday; 12 October 1793
22	Sunday; 13 October 1793
23	Monday; 14 October 1793
24	Tuesday; 15 October 1793
25	Wednesday; 16 October 1793
26	Thursday; 17 October 1793
27	Friday; 18 October 1793
28	Saturday; 19 October 1793
29	Sunday; 20 October 1793
30	Monday; 21 October 1793

Decimal time – 10 h/day
Paris
9:27:84

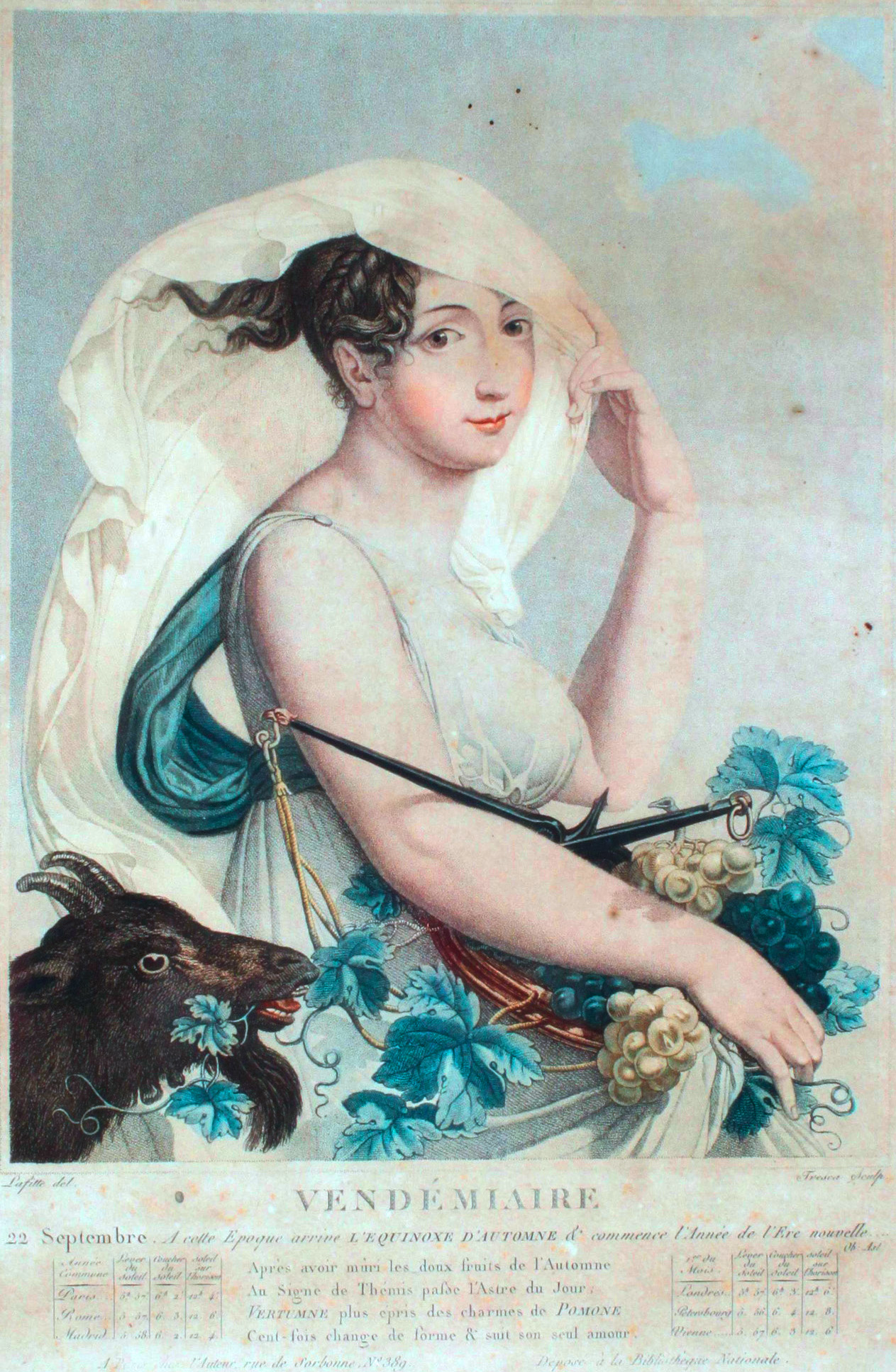
Vendémiaire

22:16:06
Time of day - 24 h/day
Greenwich

Year: 3
Month: Vendémiaire
Year: III

Day of the 10-day
week (décade)
Primidi
Duodi
Tridi
Quartidi
Quintidi
Sextidi
Septidi
Octidi
Nonidi
Décadi

décade 1
1	Monday; 22 September 1794
2	Tuesday; 23 September 1794
3	Wednesday; 24 September 1794
4	Thursday; 25 September 1794
5	Friday; 26 September 1794
6	Saturday; 27 September 1794
7	Sunday; 28 September 1794
8	Monday; 29 September 1794
9	Tuesday; 30 September 1794
10	Wednesday; 1 October 1794

décade 2
11	Thursday; 2 October 1794
12	Friday; 3 October 1794
13	Saturday; 4 October 1794
14	Sunday; 5 October 1794
15	Monday; 6 October 1794
16	Tuesday; 7 October 1794
17	Wednesday; 8 October 1794
18	Thursday; 9 October 1794
19	Friday; 10 October 1794
20	Saturday; 11 October 1794

décade 3
21	Sunday; 12 October 1794
22	Monday; 13 October 1794
23	Tuesday; 14 October 1794
24	Wednesday; 15 October 1794
25	Thursday; 16 October 1794
26	Friday; 17 October 1794
27	Saturday; 18 October 1794
28	Sunday; 19 October 1794
29	Monday; 20 October 1794
30	Tuesday; 21 October 1794

Decimal time – 10 h/day
Paris
9:27:84

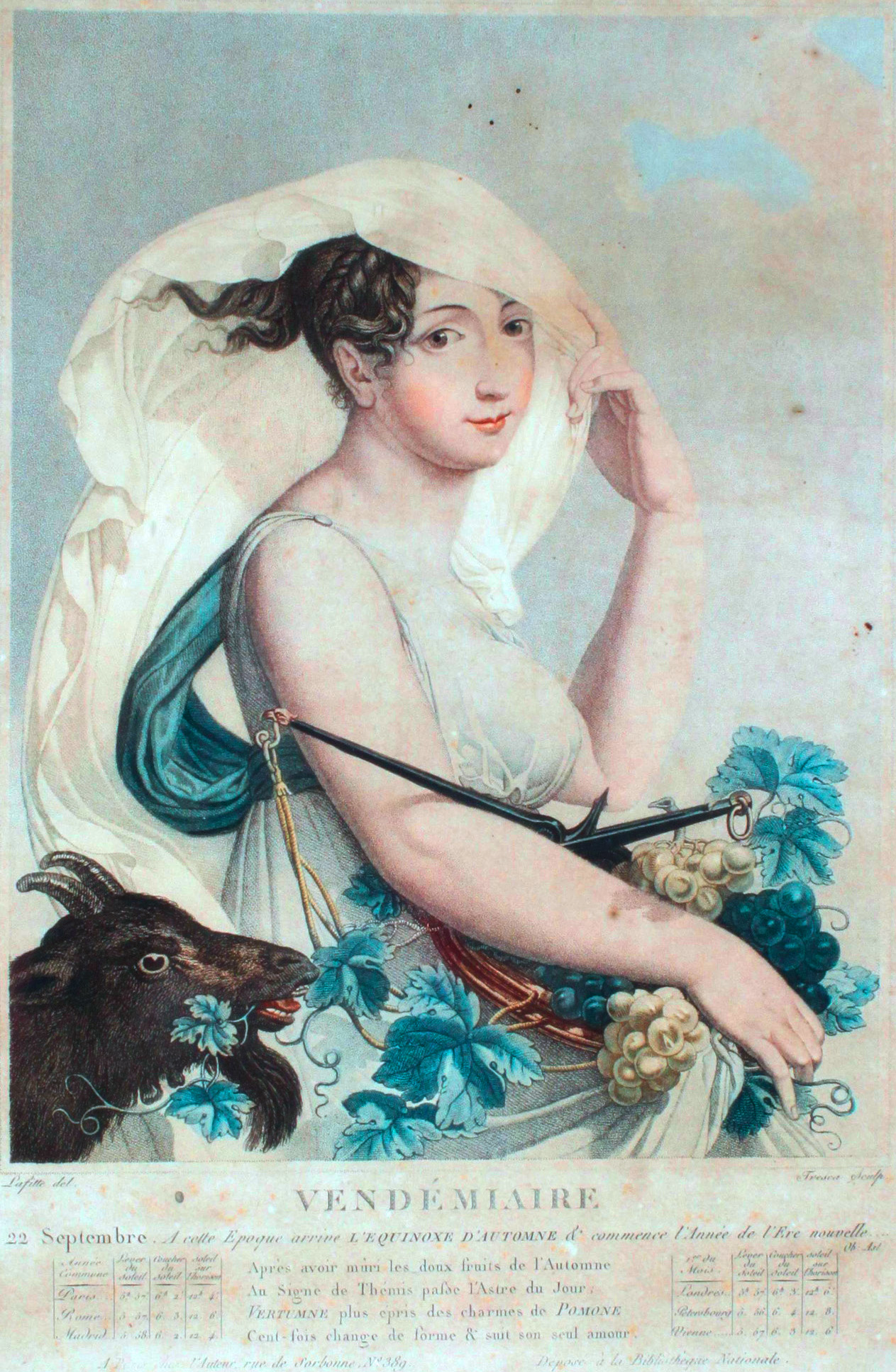
Vendémiaire

22:16:06
Time of day - 24 h/day
Greenwich

Year: 4
Month: Vendémiaire
Year: IV

Day of the 10-day
week (décade)
Primidi
Duodi
Tridi
Quartidi
Quintidi
Sextidi
Septidi
Octidi
Nonidi
Décadi

décade 1
1	Wednesday; 23 September 1795
2	Thursday; 24 September 1795
3	Friday; 25 September 1795
4	Saturday; 26 September 1795
5	Sunday; 27 September 1795
6	Monday; 28 September 1795
7	Tuesday; 29 September 1795
8	Wednesday; 30 September 1795
9	Thursday; 1 October 1795
10	Friday; 2 October 1795

décade 2
11	Saturday; 3 October 1795
12	Sunday; 4 October 1795
13	Monday; 5 October 1795
14	Tuesday; 6 October 1795
15	Wednesday; 7 October 1795
16	Thursday; 8 October 1795
17	Friday; 9 October 1795
18	Saturday; 10 October 1795
19	Sunday; 11 October 1795
20	Monday; 12 October 1795

décade 3
21	Tuesday; 13 October 1795
22	Wednesday; 14 October 1795
23	Thursday; 15 October 1795
24	Friday; 16 October 1795
25	Saturday; 17 October 1795
26	Sunday; 18 October 1795
27	Monday; 19 October 1795
28	Tuesday; 20 October 1795
29	Wednesday; 21 October 1795
30	Thursday; 22 October 1795

Decimal time – 10 h/day
Paris
9:27:84

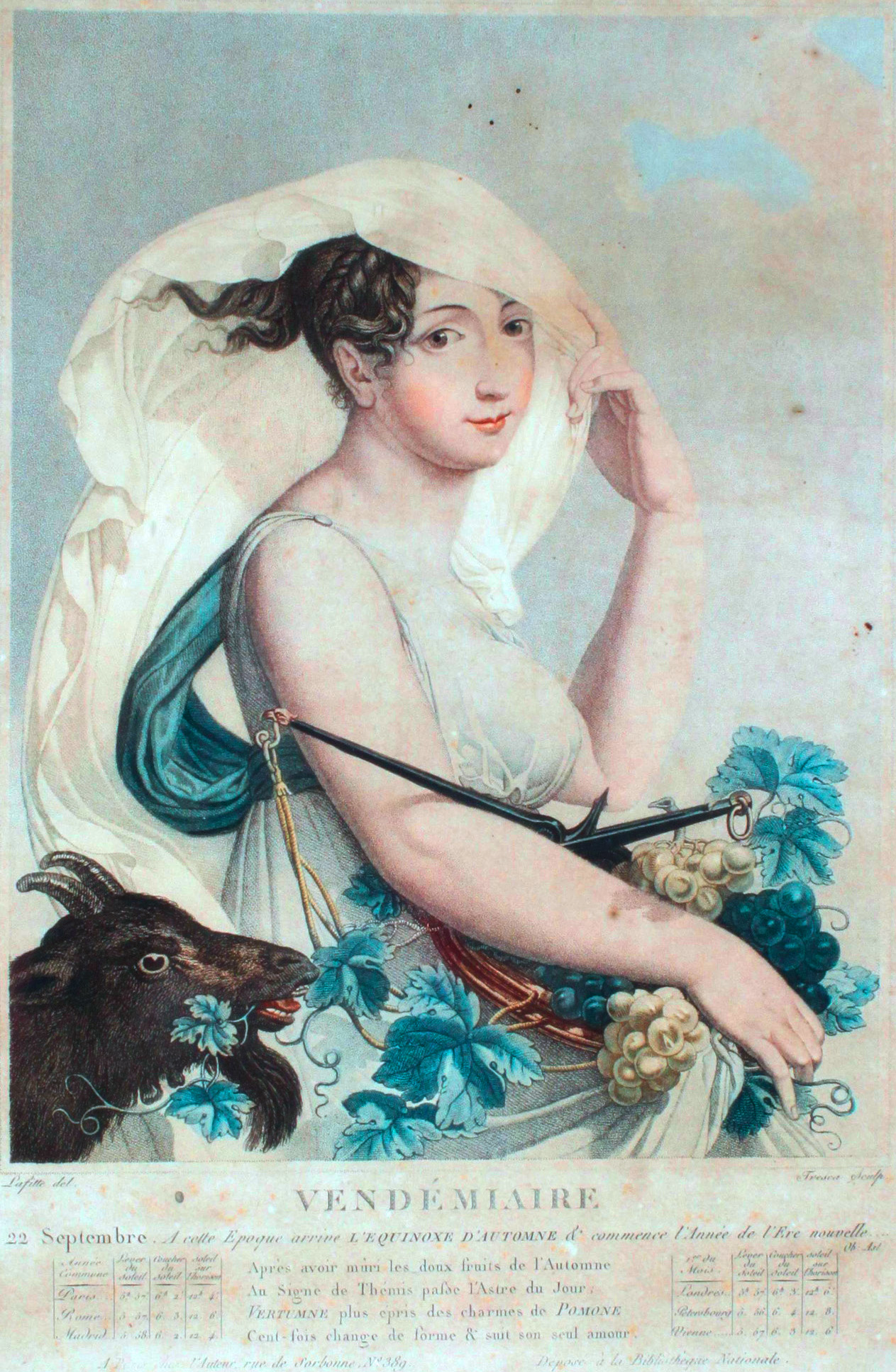
Vendémiaire

22:16:06
Time of day - 24 h/day
Greenwich

Year: 5
Month: Vendémiaire
Year: V

Day of the 10-day
week (décade)
Primidi
Duodi
Tridi
Quartidi
Quintidi
Sextidi
Septidi
Octidi
Nonidi
Décadi

décade 1
1	Thursday; 22 September 1796
2	Friday; 23 September 1796
3	Saturday; 24 September 1796
4	Sunday; 25 September 1796
5	Monday; 26 September 1796
6	Tuesday; 27 September 1796
7	Wednesday; 28 September 1796
8	Thursday; 29 September 1796
9	Friday; 30 September 1796
10	Saturday; 1 October 1796

décade 2
11	Sunday; 2 October 1796
12	Monday; 3 October 1796
13	Tuesday; 4 October 1796
14	Wednesday; 5 October 1796
15	Thursday; 6 October 1796
16	Friday; 7 October 1796
17	Saturday; 8 October 1796
18	Sunday; 9 October 1796
19	Monday; 10 October 1796
20	Tuesday; 11 October 1796

décade 3
21	Wednesday; 12 October 1796
22	Thursday; 13 October 1796
23	Friday; 14 October 1796
24	Saturday; 15 October 1796
25	Sunday; 16 October 1796
26	Monday; 17 October 1796
27	Tuesday; 18 October 1796
28	Wednesday; 19 October 1796
29	Thursday; 20 October 1796
30	Friday; 21 October 1796

Decimal time – 10 h/day
Paris
9:27:84

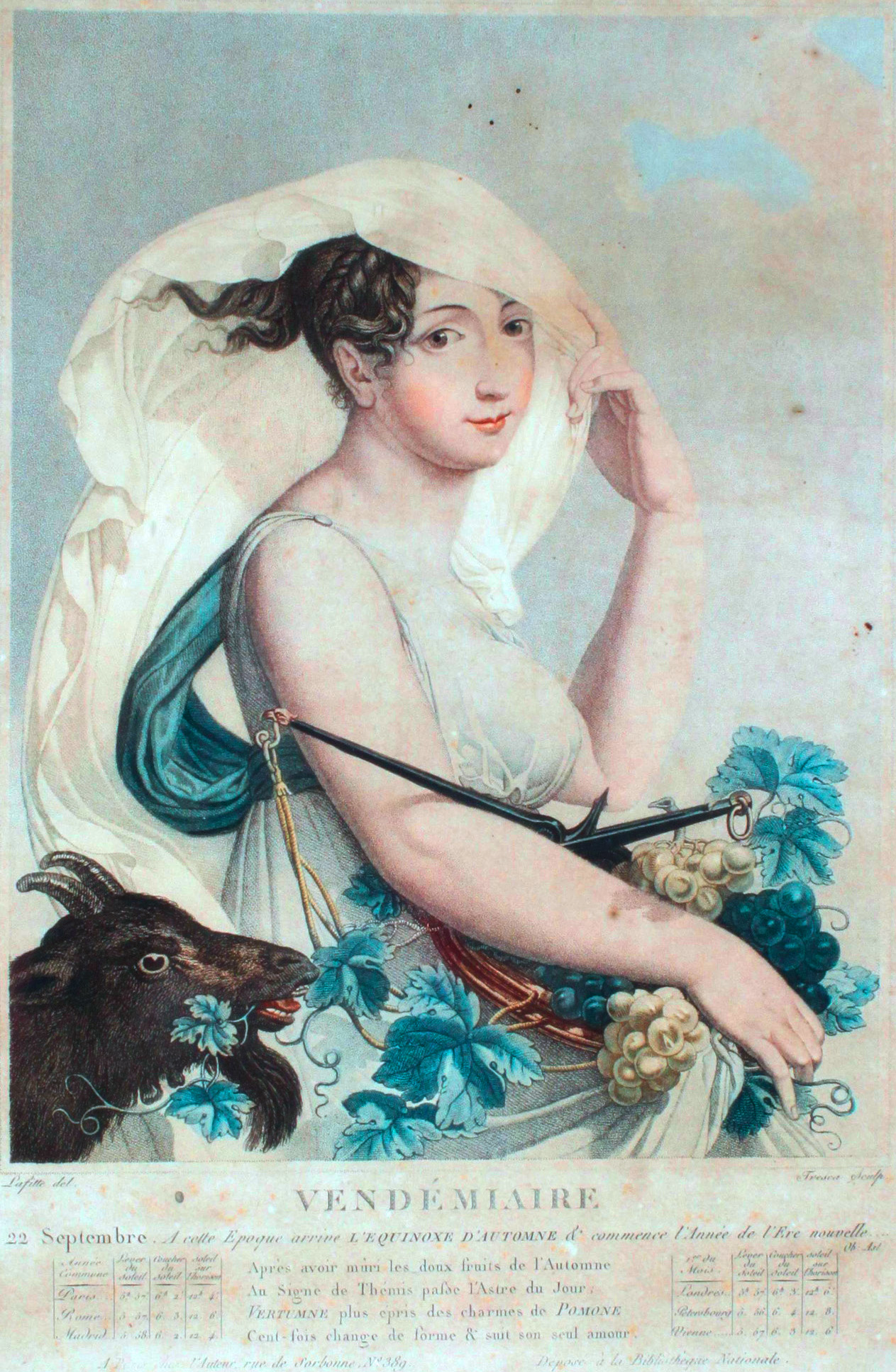
Vendémiaire

22:16:06
Time of day - 24 h/day
Greenwich

Year: 6
Month: Vendémiaire
Year: VI

Day of the 10-day
week (décade)
Primidi
Duodi
Tridi
Quartidi
Quintidi
Sextidi
Septidi
Octidi
Nonidi
Décadi

décade 1
1	Friday; 22 September 1797
2	Saturday; 23 September 1797
3	Sunday; 24 September 1797
4	Monday; 25 September 1797
5	Tuesday; 26 September 1797
6	Wednesday; 27 September 1797
7	Thursday; 28 September 1797
8	Friday; 29 September 1797
9	Saturday; 30 September 1797
10	Sunday; 1 October 1797

décade 2
11	Monday; 2 October 1797
12	Tuesday; 3 October 1797
13	Wednesday; 4 October 1797
14	Thursday; 5 October 1797
15	Friday; 6 October 1797
16	Saturday; 7 October 1797
17	Sunday; 8 October 1797
18	Monday; 9 October 1797
19	Tuesday; 10 October 1797
20	Wednesday; 11 October 1797

décade 3
21	Thursday; 12 October 1797
22	Friday; 13 October 1797
23	Saturday; 14 October 1797
24	Sunday; 15 October 1797
25	Monday; 16 October 1797
26	Tuesday; 17 October 1797
27	Wednesday; 18 October 1797
28	Thursday; 19 October 1797
29	Friday; 20 October 1797
30	Saturday; 21 October 1797

Decimal time – 10 h/day
Paris
9:27:84

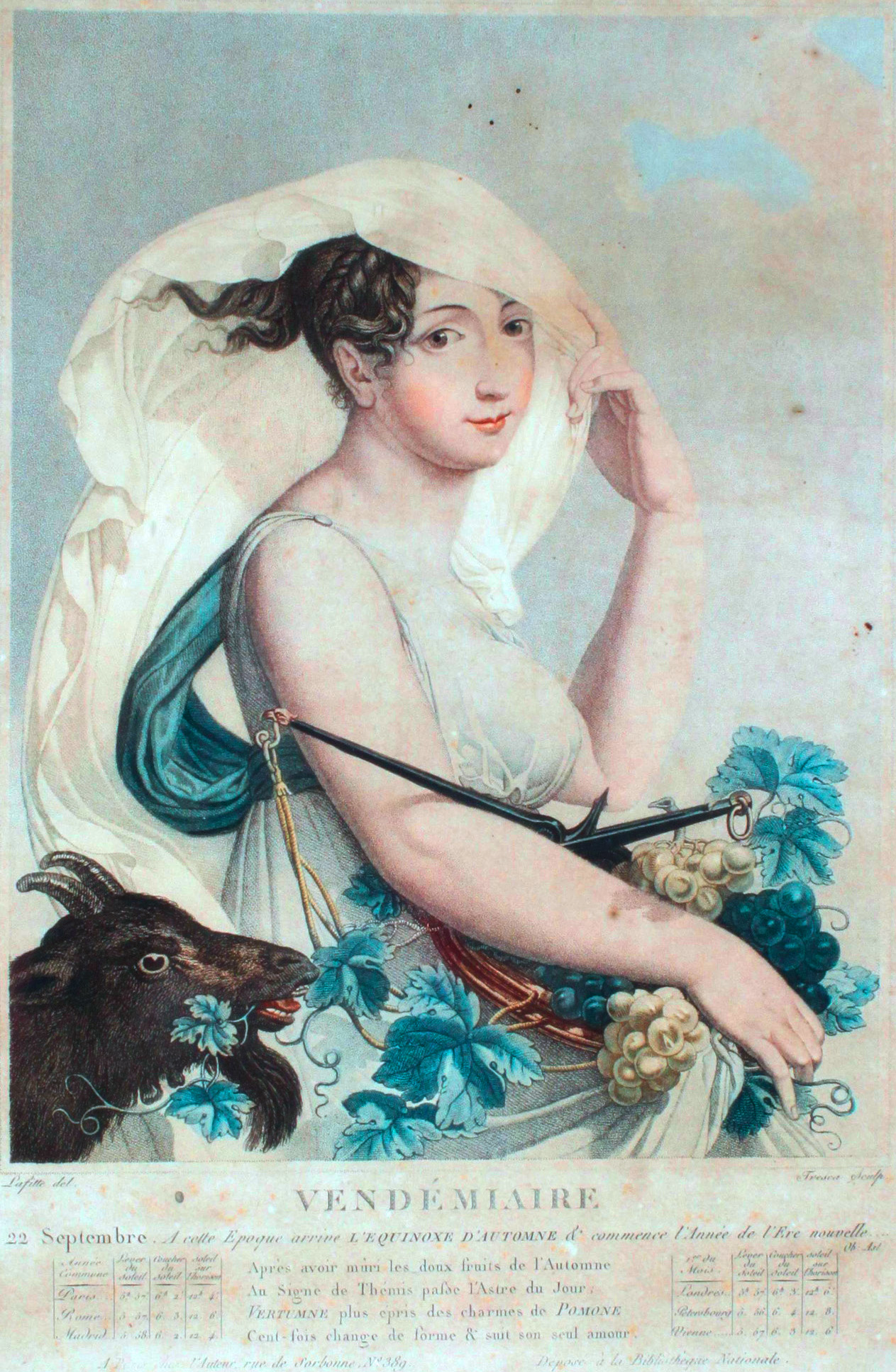
Vendémiaire

22:16:06
Time of day - 24 h/day
Greenwich

Year: 7
Month: Vendémiaire
Year: VII

Day of the 10-day
week (décade)
Primidi
Duodi
Tridi
Quartidi
Quintidi
Sextidi
Septidi
Octidi
Nonidi
Décadi

décade 1
1	Saturday; 22 September 1798
2	Sunday; 23 September 1798
3	Monday; 24 September 1798
4	Tuesday; 25 September 1798
5	Wednesday; 26 September 1798
6	Thursday; 27 September 1798
7	Friday; 28 September 1798
8	Saturday; 29 September 1798
9	Sunday; 30 September 1798
10	Monday; 1 October 1798

décade 2
11	Tuesday; 2 October 1798
12	Wednesday; 3 October 1798
13	Thursday; 4 October 1798
14	Friday; 5 October 1798
15	Saturday; 6 October 1798
16	Sunday; 7 October 1798
17	Monday; 8 October 1798
18	Tuesday; 9 October 1798
19	Wednesday; 10 October 1798
20	Thursday; 11 October 1798

décade 3
21	Friday; 12 October 1798
22	Saturday; 13 October 1798
23	Sunday; 14 October 1798
24	Monday; 15 October 1798
25	Tuesday; 16 October 1798
26	Wednesday; 17 October 1798
27	Thursday; 18 October 1798
28	Friday; 19 October 1798
29	Saturday; 20 October 1798
30	Sunday; 21 October 1798

Decimal time – 10 h/day
Paris
9:27:84

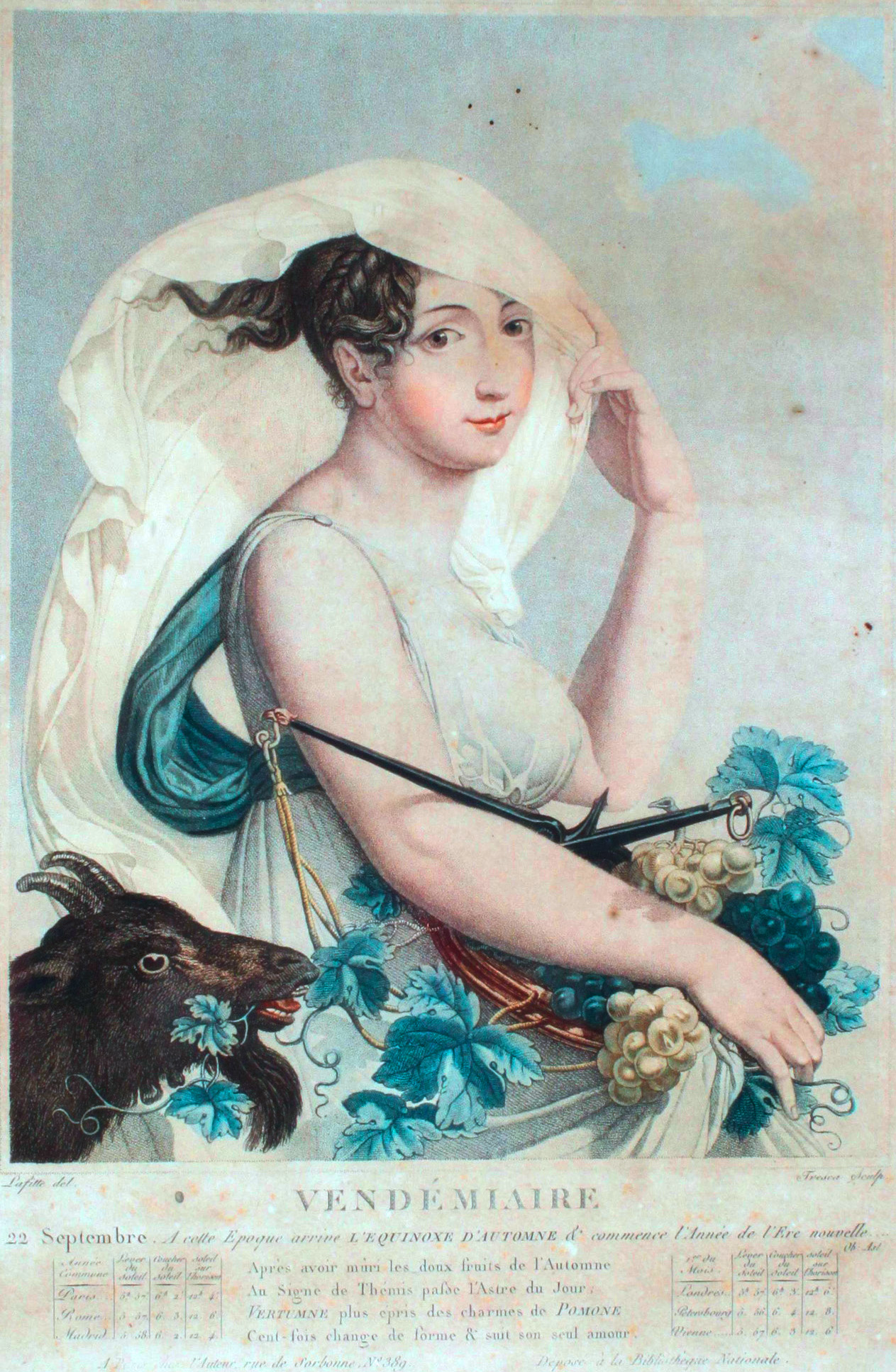
Vendémiaire

22:16:06
Time of day - 24 h/day
Greenwich

Year: 8
Month: Vendémiaire
Year: VIII

Day of the 10-day
week (décade)
Primidi
Duodi
Tridi
Quartidi
Quintidi
Sextidi
Septidi
Octidi
Nonidi
Décadi

décade 1
1	Monday; 23 September 1799
2	Tuesday; 24 September 1799
3	Wednesday; 25 September 1799
4	Thursday; 26 September 1799
5	Friday; 27 September 1799
6	Saturday; 28 September 1799
7	Sunday; 29 September 1799
8	Monday; 30 September 1799
9	Tuesday; 1 October 1799
10	Wednesday; 2 October 1799

décade 2
11	Thursday; 3 October 1799
12	Friday; 4 October 1799
13	Saturday; 5 October 1799
14	Sunday; 6 October 1799
15	Monday; 7 October 1799
16	Tuesday; 8 October 1799
17	Wednesday; 9 October 1799
18	Thursday; 10 October 1799
19	Friday; 11 October 1799
20	Saturday; 12 October 1799

décade 3
21	Sunday; 13 October 1799
22	Monday; 14 October 1799
23	Tuesday; 15 October 1799
24	Wednesday; 16 October 1799
25	Thursday; 17 October 1799
26	Friday; 18 October 1799
27	Saturday; 19 October 1799
28	Sunday; 20 October 1799
29	Monday; 21 October 1799
30	Tuesday; 22 October 1799

Decimal time – 10 h/day
Paris
9:27:84

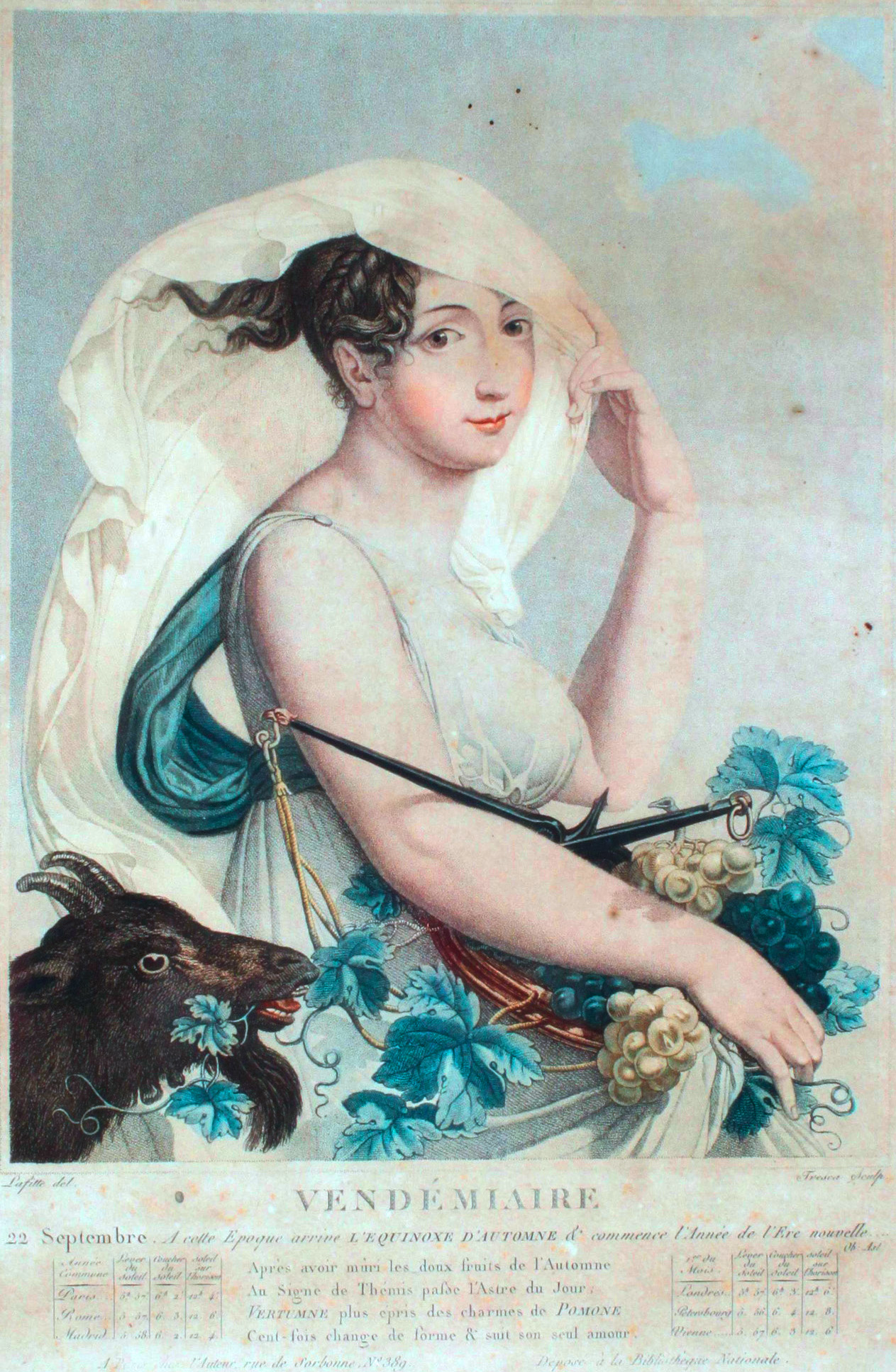
Vendémiaire

22:16:06
Time of day - 24 h/day
Greenwich

Year: 9
Month: Vendémiaire
Year: IX

Day of the 10-day
week (décade)
Primidi
Duodi
Tridi
Quartidi
Quintidi
Sextidi
Septidi
Octidi
Nonidi
Décadi

décade 1
1	Tuesday; 23 September 1800
2	Wednesday; 24 September 1800
3	Thursday; 25 September 1800
4	Friday; 26 September 1800
5	Saturday; 27 September 1800
6	Sunday; 28 September 1800
7	Monday; 29 September 1800
8	Tuesday; 30 September 1800
9	Wednesday; 1 October 1800
10	Thursday; 2 October 1800

décade 2
11	Friday; 3 October 1800
12	Saturday; 4 October 1800
13	Sunday; 5 October 1800
14	Monday; 6 October 1800
15	Tuesday; 7 October 1800
16	Wednesday; 8 October 1800
17	Thursday; 9 October 1800
18	Friday; 10 October 1800
19	Saturday; 11 October 1800
20	Sunday; 12 October 1800

décade 3
21	Monday; 13 October 1800
22	Tuesday; 14 October 1800
23	Wednesday; 15 October 1800
24	Thursday; 16 October 1800
25	Friday; 17 October 1800
26	Saturday; 18 October 1800
27	Sunday; 19 October 1800
28	Monday; 20 October 1800
29	Tuesday; 21 October 1800
30	Wednesday; 22 October 1800

Decimal time – 10 h/day
Paris
9:27:84

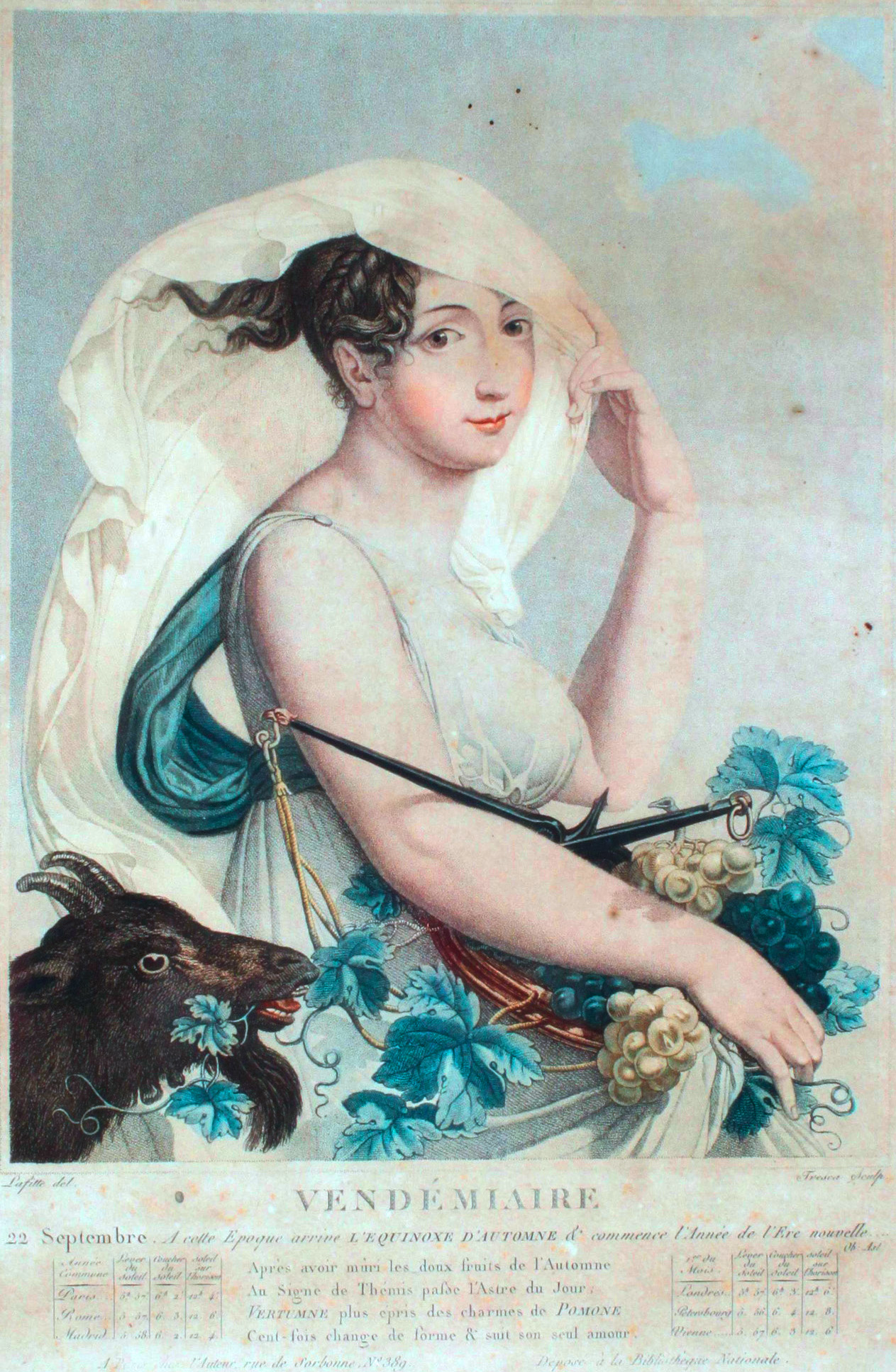
Vendémiaire

22:16:06
Time of day - 24 h/day
Greenwich

Year: 10
Month: Vendémiaire
Year: X

Day of the 10-day
week (décade)
Primidi
Duodi
Tridi
Quartidi
Quintidi
Sextidi
Septidi
Octidi
Nonidi
Décadi

décade 1
1	Wednesday; 23 September 1801
2	Thursday; 24 September 1801
3	Friday; 25 September 1801
4	Saturday; 26 September 1801
5	Sunday; 27 September 1801
6	Monday; 28 September 1801
7	Tuesday; 29 September 1801
8	Wednesday; 30 September 1801
9	Thursday; 1 October 1801
10	Friday; 2 October 1801

décade 2
11	Saturday; 3 October 1801
12	Sunday; 4 October 1801
13	Monday; 5 October 1801
14	Tuesday; 6 October 1801
15	Wednesday; 7 October 1801
16	Thursday; 8 October 1801
17	Friday; 9 October 1801
18	Saturday; 10 October 1801
19	Sunday; 11 October 1801
20	Monday; 12 October 1801

décade 3
21	Tuesday; 13 October 1801
22	Wednesday; 14 October 1801
23	Thursday; 15 October 1801
24	Friday; 16 October 1801
25	Saturday; 17 October 1801
26	Sunday; 18 October 1801
27	Monday; 19 October 1801
28	Tuesday; 20 October 1801
29	Wednesday; 21 October 1801
30	Thursday; 22 October 1801

Decimal time – 10 h/day
Paris
9:27:84

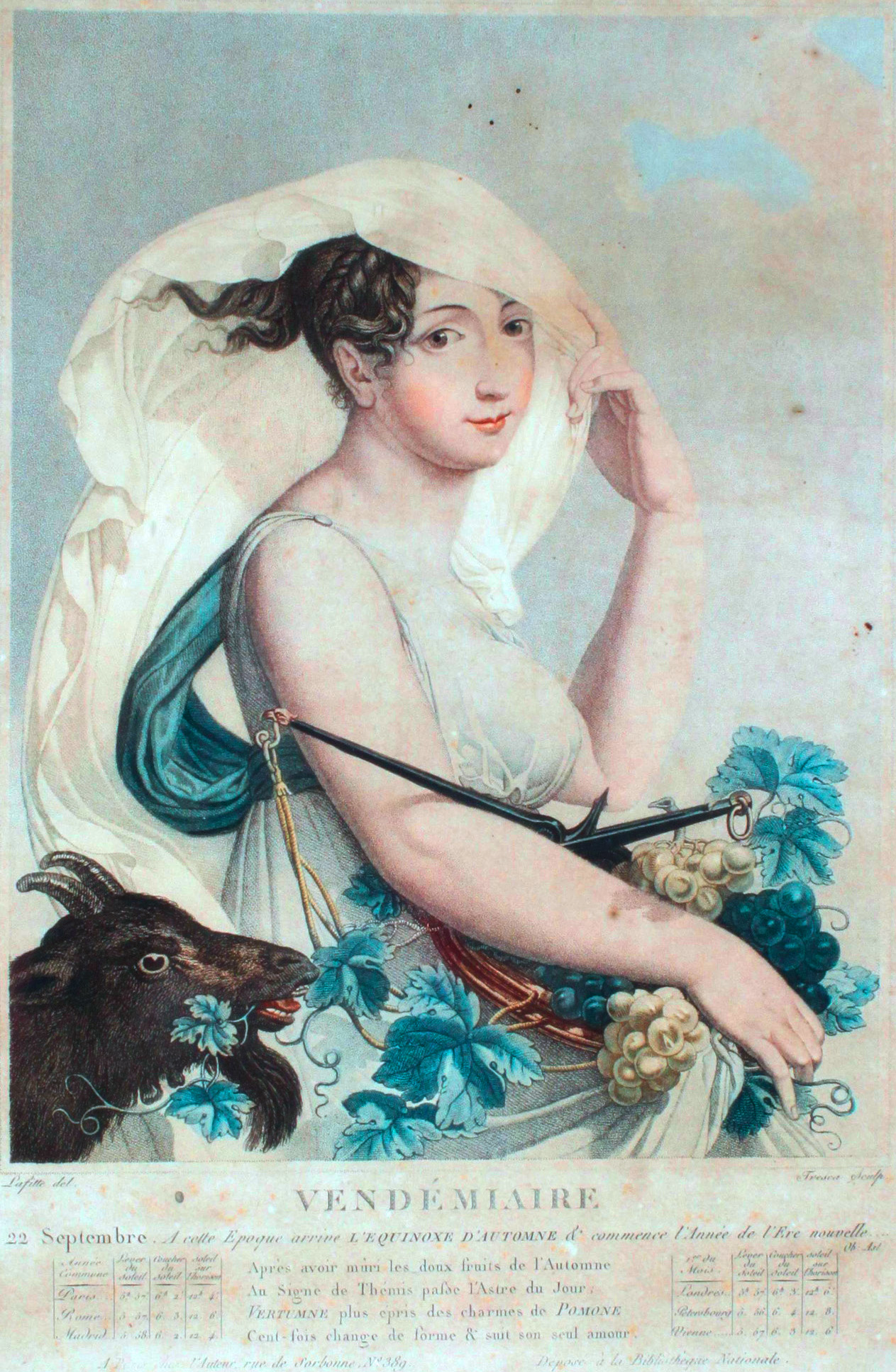
Vendémiaire

22:16:06
Time of day - 24 h/day
Greenwich

Year: 11
Month: Vendémiaire
Year: XI

Day of the 10-day
week (décade)
Primidi
Duodi
Tridi
Quartidi
Quintidi
Sextidi
Septidi
Octidi
Nonidi
Décadi

décade 1
1	Thursday; 23 September 1802
2	Friday; 24 September 1802
3	Saturday; 25 September 1802
4	Sunday; 26 September 1802
5	Monday; 27 September 1802
6	Tuesday; 28 September 1802
7	Wednesday; 29 September 1802
8	Thursday; 30 September 1802
9	Friday; 1 October 1802
10	Saturday; 2 October 1802

décade 2
11	Sunday; 3 October 1802
12	Monday; 4 October 1802
13	Tuesday; 5 October 1802
14	Wednesday; 6 October 1802
15	Thursday; 7 October 1802
16	Friday; 8 October 1802
17	Saturday; 9 October 1802
18	Sunday; 10 October 1802
19	Monday; 11 October 1802
20	Tuesday; 12 October 1802

décade 3
21	Wednesday; 13 October 1802
22	Thursday; 14 October 1802
23	Friday; 15 October 1802
24	Saturday; 16 October 1802
25	Sunday; 17 October 1802
26	Monday; 18 October 1802
27	Tuesday; 19 October 1802
28	Wednesday; 20 October 1802
29	Thursday; 21 October 1802
30	Friday; 22 October 1802

Decimal time – 10 h/day
Paris
9:27:84

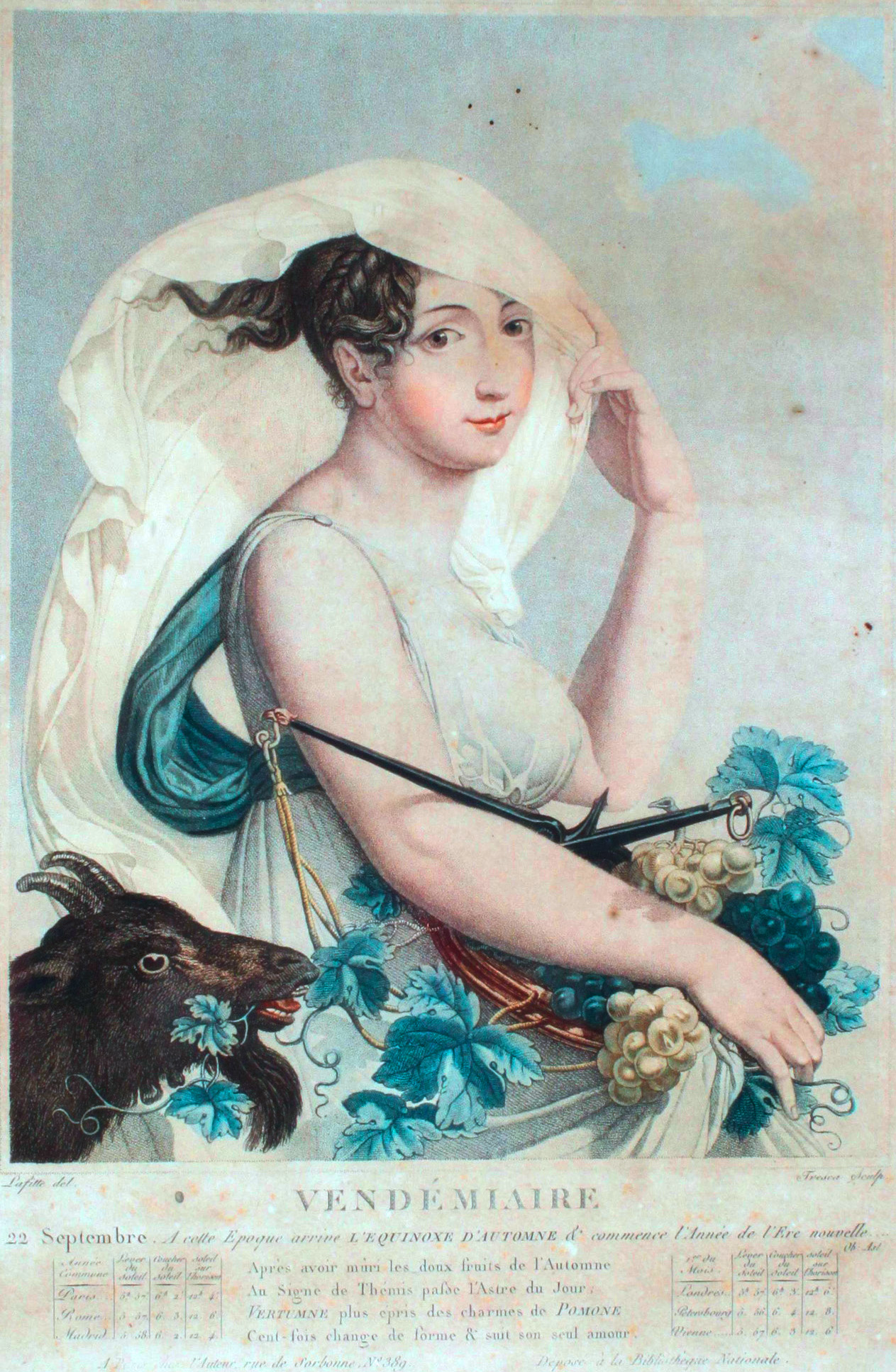
Vendémiaire

22:16:06
Time of day - 24 h/day
Greenwich

Year: 12
Month: Vendémiaire
Year: XII

Day of the 10-day
week (décade)
Primidi
Duodi
Tridi
Quartidi
Quintidi
Sextidi
Septidi
Octidi
Nonidi
Décadi

décade 1
1	Saturday; 24 September 1803
2	Sunday; 25 September 1803
3	Monday; 26 September 1803
4	Tuesday; 27 September 1803
5	Wednesday; 28 September 1803
6	Thursday; 29 September 1803
7	Friday; 30 September 1803
8	Saturday; 1 October 1803
9	Sunday; 2 October 1803
10	Monday; 3 October 1803

décade 2
11	Tuesday; 4 October 1803
12	Wednesday; 5 October 1803
13	Thursday; 6 October 1803
14	Friday; 7 October 1803
15	Saturday; 8 October 1803
16	Sunday; 9 October 1803
17	Monday; 10 October 1803
18	Tuesday; 11 October 1803
19	Wednesday; 12 October 1803
20	Thursday; 13 October 1803

décade 3
21	Friday; 14 October 1803
22	Saturday; 15 October 1803
23	Sunday; 16 October 1803
24	Monday; 17 October 1803
25	Tuesday; 18 October 1803
26	Wednesday; 19 October 1803
27	Thursday; 20 October 1803
28	Friday; 21 October 1803
29	Saturday; 22 October 1803
30	Sunday; 23 October 1803

Decimal time – 10 h/day
Paris
9:27:84

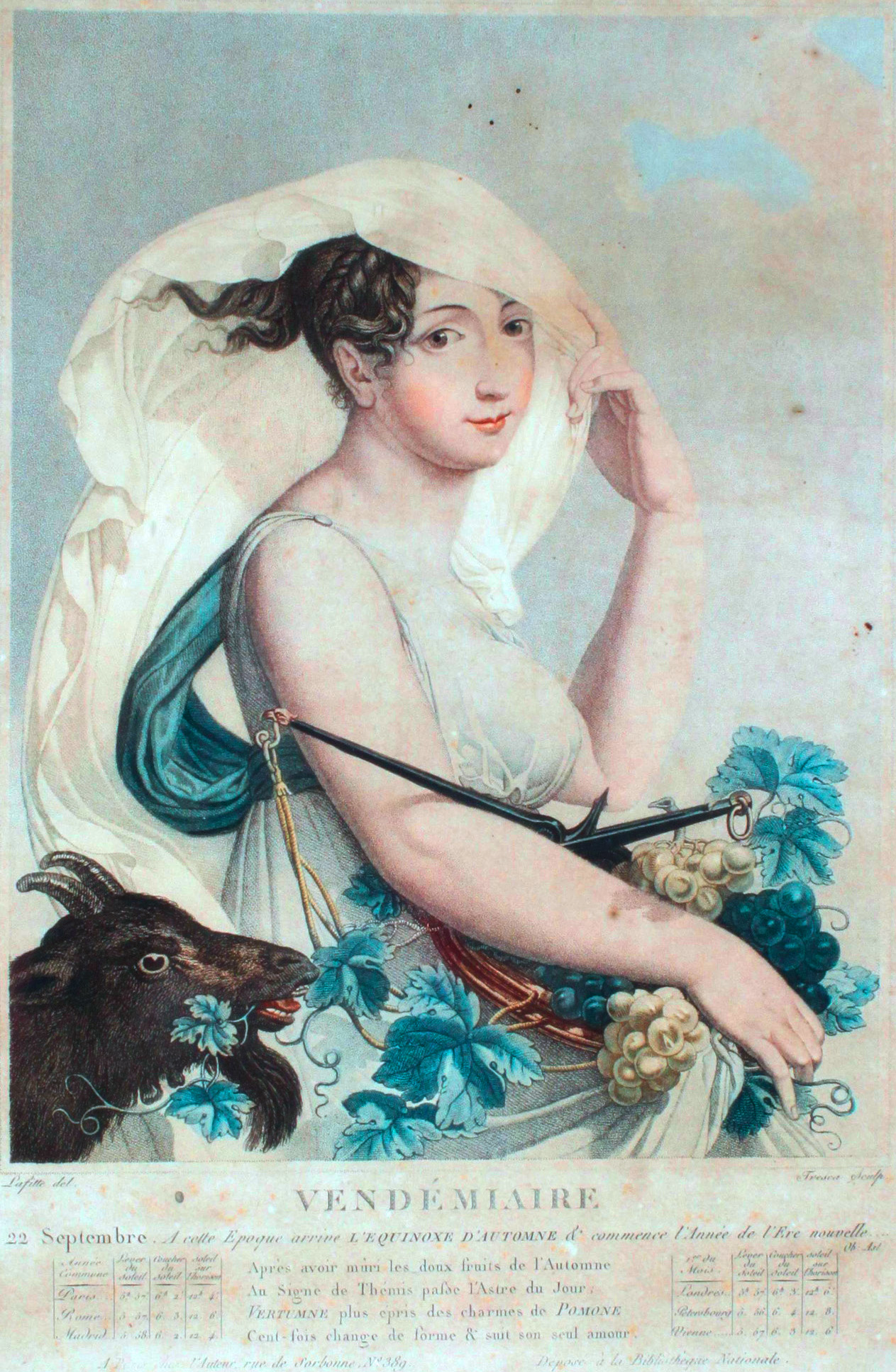
Vendémiaire

22:16:06
Time of day - 24 h/day
Greenwich

Year: 13
Month: Vendémiaire
Year: XIII

Day of the 10-day
week (décade)
Primidi
Duodi
Tridi
Quartidi
Quintidi
Sextidi
Septidi
Octidi
Nonidi
Décadi

décade 1
1	Sunday; 23 September 1804
2	Monday; 24 September 1804
3	Tuesday; 25 September 1804
4	Wednesday; 26 September 1804
5	Thursday; 27 September 1804
6	Friday; 28 September 1804
7	Saturday; 29 September 1804
8	Sunday; 30 September 1804
9	Monday; 1 October 1804
10	Tuesday; 2 October 1804

décade 2
11	Wednesday; 3 October 1804
12	Thursday; 4 October 1804
13	Friday; 5 October 1804
14	Saturday; 6 October 1804
15	Sunday; 7 October 1804
16	Monday; 8 October 1804
17	Tuesday; 9 October 1804
18	Wednesday; 10 October 1804
19	Thursday; 11 October 1804
20	Friday; 12 October 1804

décade 3
21	Saturday; 13 October 1804
22	Sunday; 14 October 1804
23	Monday; 15 October 1804
24	Tuesday; 16 October 1804
25	Wednesday; 17 October 1804
26	Thursday; 18 October 1804
27	Friday; 19 October 1804
28	Saturday; 20 October 1804
29	Sunday; 21 October 1804
30	Monday; 22 October 1804

Decimal time – 10 h/day
Paris
9:27:84

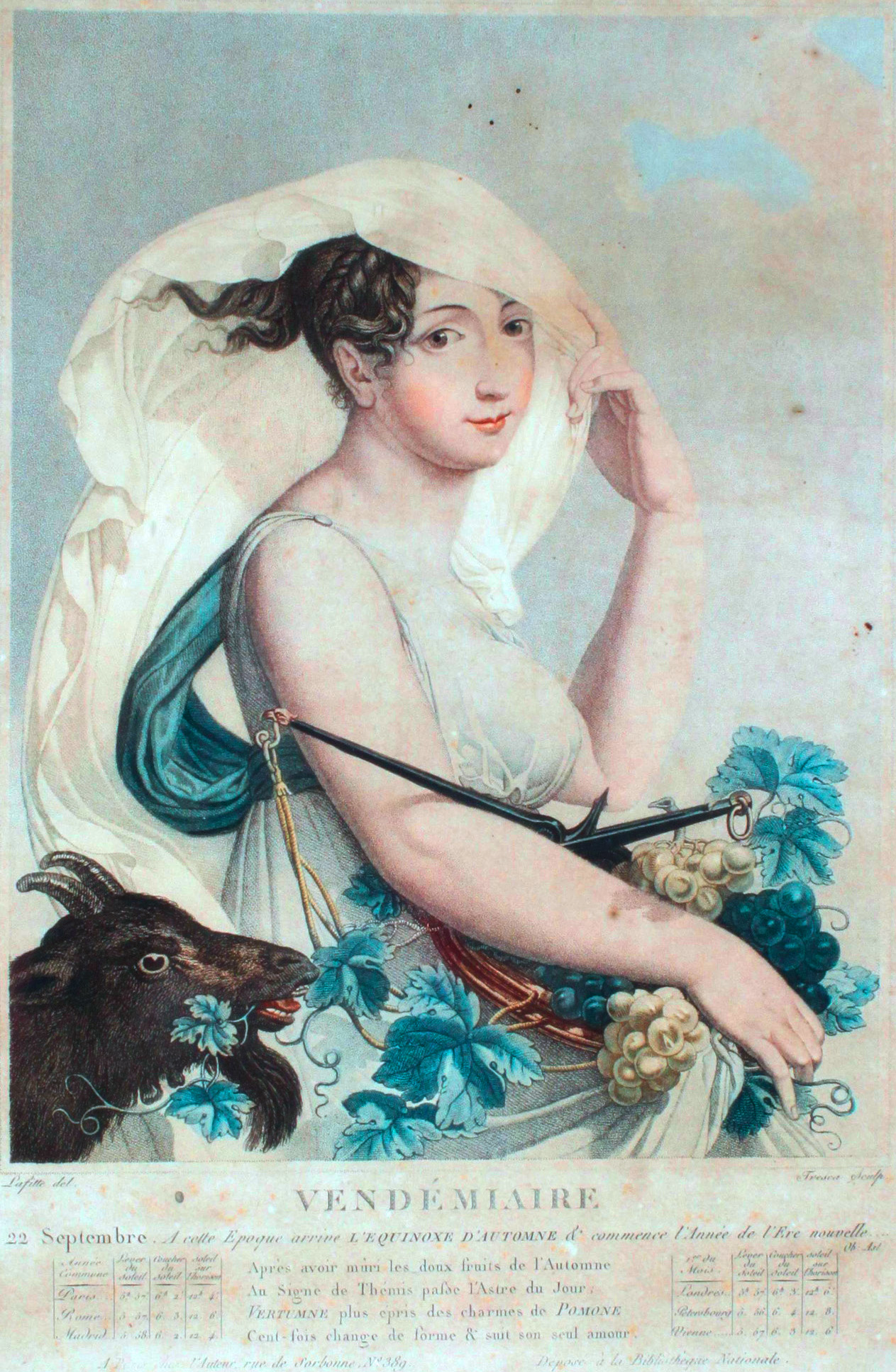
Vendémiaire

22:16:06
Time of day - 24 h/day
Greenwich

Year: 14
Month: Vendémiaire
Year: XIV

Day of the 10-day
week (décade)
Primidi
Duodi
Tridi
Quartidi
Quintidi
Sextidi
Septidi
Octidi
Nonidi
Décadi

décade 1
1	Monday; 23 September 1805
2	Tuesday; 24 September 1805
3	Wednesday; 25 September 1805
4	Thursday; 26 September 1805
5	Friday; 27 September 1805
6	Saturday; 28 September 1805
7	Sunday; 29 September 1805
8	Monday; 30 September 1805
9	Tuesday; 1 October 1805
10	Wednesday; 2 October 1805

décade 2
11	Thursday; 3 October 1805
12	Friday; 4 October 1805
13	Saturday; 5 October 1805
14	Sunday; 6 October 1805
15	Monday; 7 October 1805
16	Tuesday; 8 October 1805
17	Wednesday; 9 October 1805
18	Thursday; 10 October 1805
19	Friday; 11 October 1805
20	Saturday; 12 October 1805

décade 3
21	Sunday; 13 October 1805
22	Monday; 14 October 1805
23	Tuesday; 15 October 1805
24	Wednesday; 16 October 1805
25	Thursday; 17 October 1805
26	Friday; 18 October 1805
27	Saturday; 19 October 1805
28	Sunday; 20 October 1805
29	Monday; 21 October 1805
30	Tuesday; 22 October 1805

Decimal time – 10 h/day
Paris
9:27:84

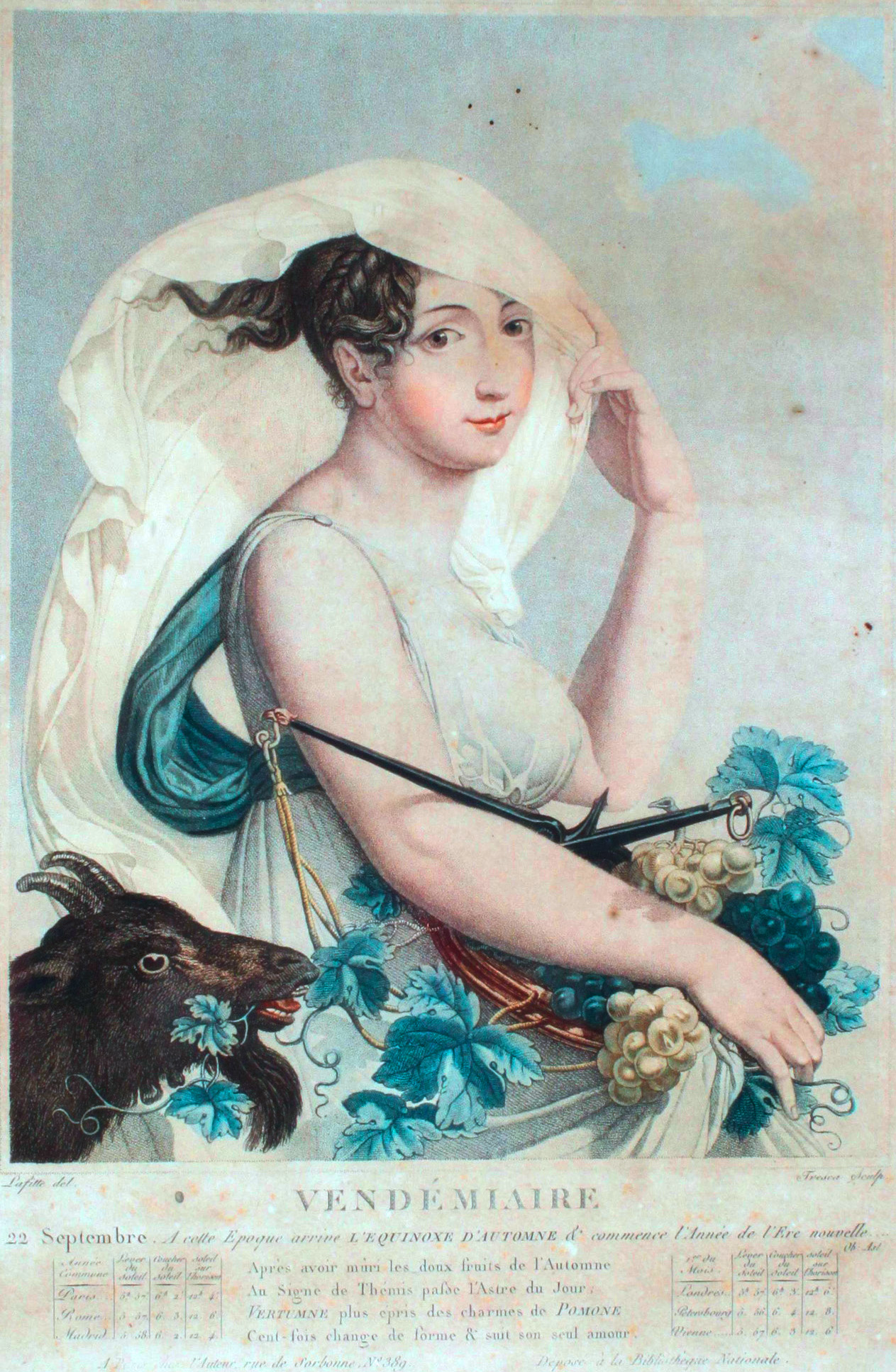
Vendémiaire

22:16:06
Time of day - 24 h/day
Greenwich

== Day name table ==
Like all FRC months Vendémiaire lasted 30 days and was divided into three 10-day weeks, called décades (decades). In accordance with the suggestion of Fabre d'Églantine, each of the days of the republican year was consecrated to some useful object. Thus every day in Vendémiaire had the name of an agricultural or ornamental plant, except the 5th (Quintidi) and 10th day (Decadi) of every decade, which had the name of a domestic animal (Quintidi) or an agricultural tool (Decadi).

	1^{re} Décade		2^{e} Décade		3^{e} Décade
Primidi	1.	Raisin (Grape)	11.	Pomme de terre (Potato)	21.	Chanvre (Hemp)
Duodi	2.	Safran (Saffron)	12.	Immortelle (Strawflower)	22.	Pêche (Peach)
Tridi	3.	Châtaigne (Chestnut)	13.	Potiron (Winter Squash)	23.	Navet (Turnip)
Quartidi	4.	Colchique (Crocus)	14.	Réséda (Reseda (plant))	24.	Amaryllis (Amaryllis)
Quintidi	5.	Cheval (horse)	15.	Âne (donkey)	25.	Bœuf (cow)
Sextidi	6.	Balsamine (Impatiens)	16.	Belle-de-nuit (Marvel of Peru)	26.	Aubergine (Eggplant)
Septidi	7.	Carotte (Carrot)	17.	Citrouille (Summer Squash)	27.	Piment (Chili pepper)
Octidi	8.	Amarante (Amaranth)	18.	Sarrasin (Oat)	28.	Tomate (Tomato)
Nonidi	9.	Panais (Parsnip)	19.	Tournesol (Sunflower)	29.	Orge (Barley)
Decadi	10.	Cuve (Vat)	20.	Pressoir (Winepress)	30.	Tonneau (Barrel)

== Conversion table ==
Table for conversion between Republican and Gregorian Calendar
for the month "Vendémiaire"

I. / II. / III. / V. / VI. / VII.
1	2	3	4	5	6	7	8	9	10	11	12	13	14	15	16	17	18	19	20	21	22	23	24	25	26	27	28	29	30
22	23	24	25	26	27	28	29	30	1	2	3	4	5	6	7	8	9	10	11	12	13	14	15	16	17	18	19	20	21
September / 1792 / 1793 / 1794 / 1796 / 1797 / 1798 / October

IV. / VIII. / IX. / X. / XI. / XIII. / XIV.
1	2	3	4	5	6	7	8	9	10	11	12	13	14	15	16	17	18	19	20	21	22	23	24	25	26	27	28	29	30
23	24	25	26	27	28	29	30	1	2	3	4	5	6	7	8	9	10	11	12	13	14	15	16	17	18	19	20	21	22
September / 1795 / 1799 / 1800 / 1801 / 1802 / 1804 / 1805 / October

XII.
1	2	3	4	5	6	7	8	9	10	11	12	13	14	15	16	17	18	19	20	21	22	23	24	25	26	27	28	29	30
24	25	26	27	28	29	30	1	2	3	4	5	6	7	8	9	10	11	12	13	14	15	16	17	18	19	20	21	22	23
September / 1803 / October
