= Jacques Roux =

French Catholic priest and revolutionary (1752–1794)

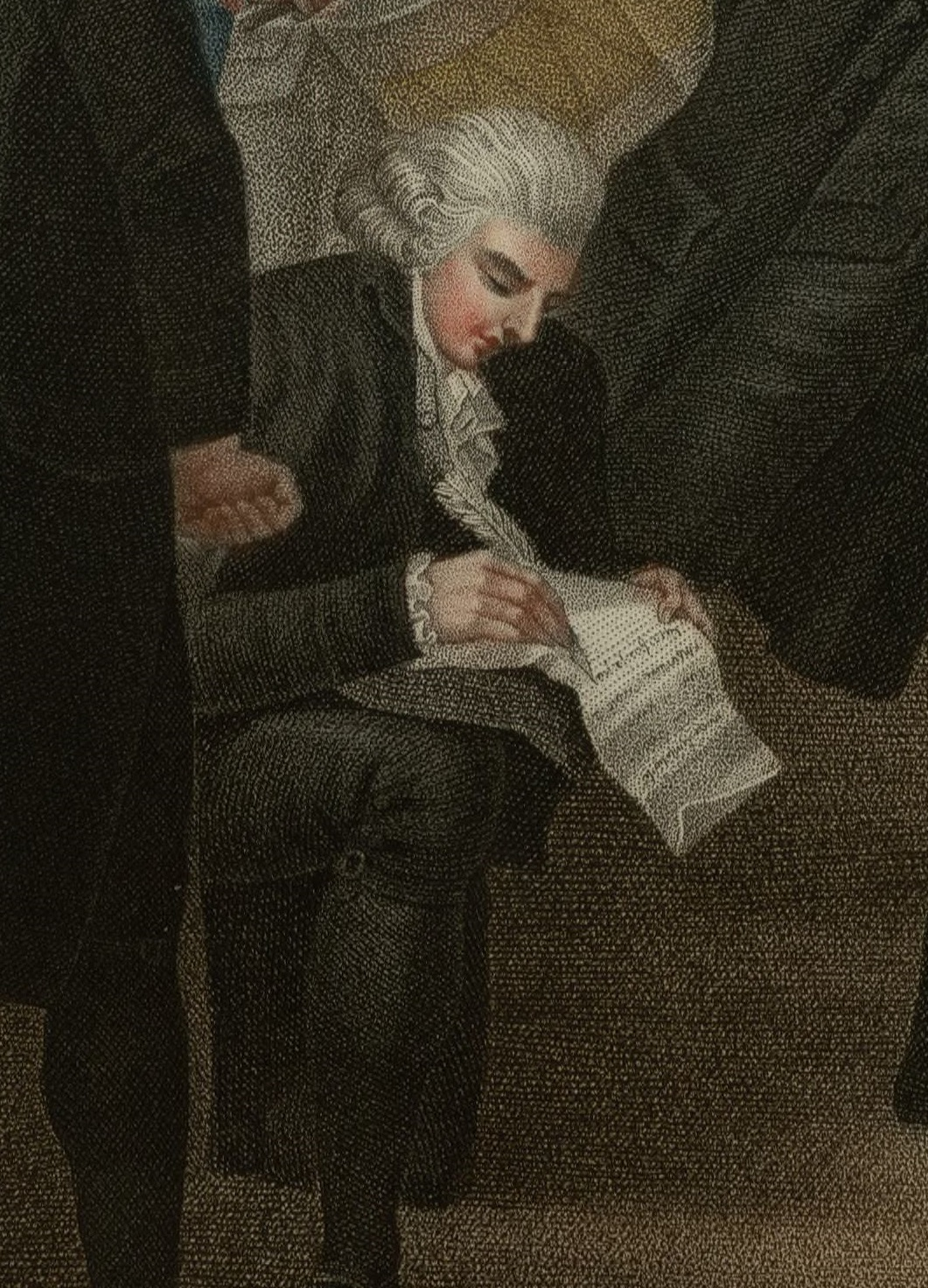
- Depiction of Roux (detail)
- Born: 21 August 1752; Pranzac, Kingdom of France
- Died: 10 February 1794 (aged 41); Bicêtre, French First Republic
- Cause of death: Suicide by stabbing
- Occupations: Catholic priest, revolutionary
- Movement: Enragés

Jacques Roux (French: [ʒak ʁu]) was a French Catholic red priest and revolutionary who became active during the French Revolution. He became a prominent spokesman for the Parisian sans-culottes and advocated price controls and measures against food hoarding and speculation. Associated with the radical current known as the Enragés, he was one of the most outspoken figures on the revolutionary left.

Roux, Jean-François Varlet and Théophile Leclerc, commonly associated with the Enragés, did not form an organized political group or share a common programme. Although they pursued different priorities, they shared a commitment to greater social and political equality. By mid-November 1793, the Enragés disappeared as an organised political movement.

== Early life and priesthood ==
Roux was born in southwest of France (Charente) and came from a bourgeois family of thirteen children. His father, Gratien Roux, was a former army officer who served as lieutenant and judicial assessor, while his mother, Marguerite Montsalard, was the daughter of a physician from the Périgord. With the patronage of the local lord, comte de Pérusse des Cars, Roux became a canon at the age of fifteen. He then attended the Jesuit college Saint-Louis in Angoulême and subsequently studied at the University of Poitiers, where he obtained the degree of maître ès arts in 1769. By the age of twenty, he was teaching philosophy and physics in Angoulême.

In July 1779, Roux was arrested following the fatal shooting of a young canon during disturbances outside the seminary. He was imprisoned for approximately three months before receiving a royal pardon. He subsequently resumed teaching, remaining at the institution until 1784. In 1785 he became chaplain to the comte de Crussol d'Uzès at the Château de Montausier, before holding successive posts as vicar at Jonzac and Cozes. On 14 September 1788, he arrived at Saint-Thomas-de-Conac, where he was serving at the outbreak of the French Revolution. In April 1790, during disturbances over feudal dues at Saint-Thomas-de-Conac, Roux was accused of having encouraged the peasants through his sermons. Although he had been serving as a substitute priest in Ambleville since 20 April and was absent when the unrest began on 25 April, he was subsequently prohibited by ecclesiastical authorities from exercising his priestly duties for six months. He left the region for Paris in May 1790.

Saint-Sulpice, nave, Paris

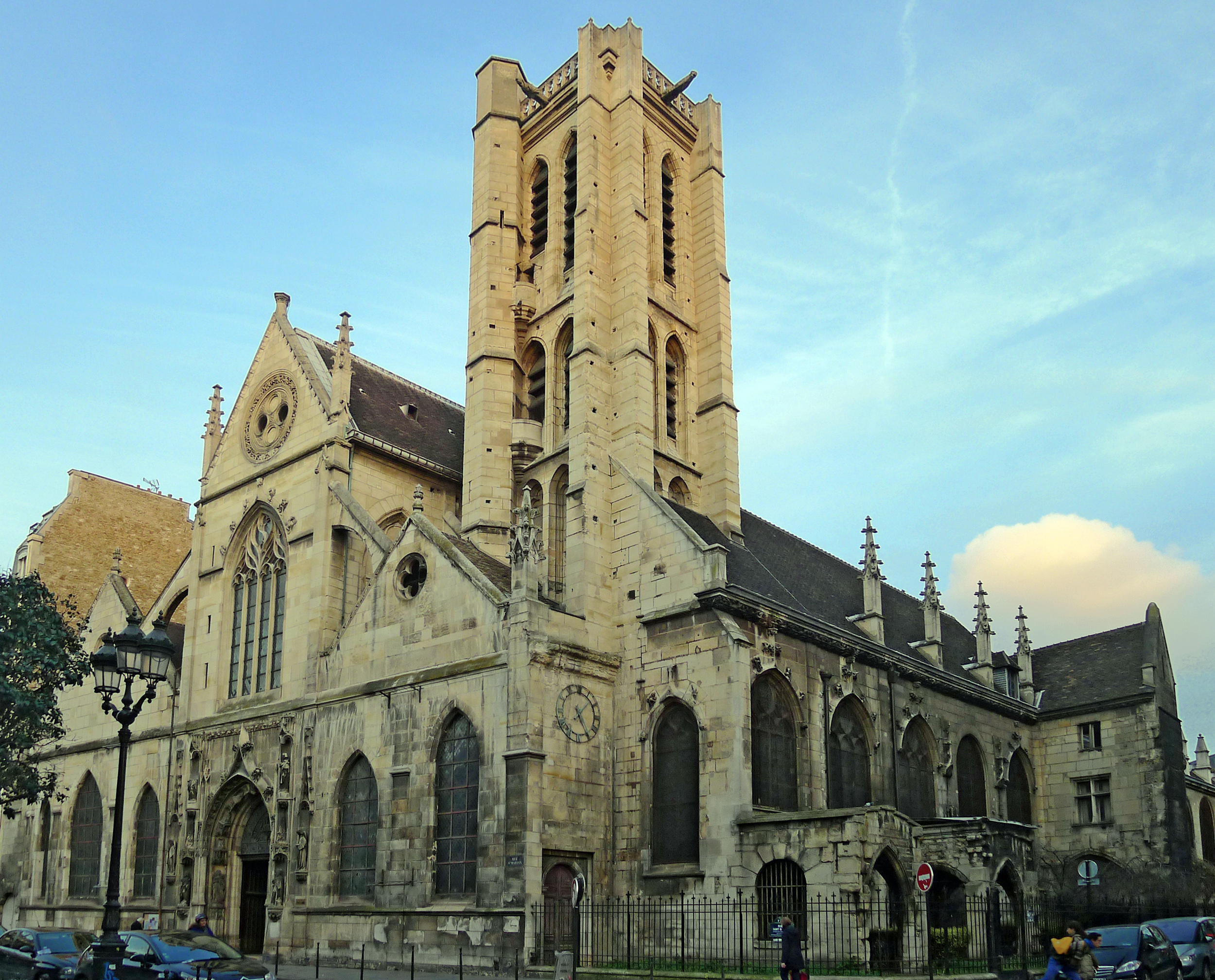
Église Saint-Nicolas-des-Champs (3rd arrondissement of Paris)

On 16 January 1791, Roux publicly took the oath required under the Civil Constitution of the Clergy at the church of Saint-Sulpice. Later that year, he became a constitutional vicar at Saint-Nicolas-des-Champs, in the Section des Gravilliers, a densely populated quarter of Paris inhabited by artisans, small shopkeepers, and wage earners. He lived on the second floor of a building on Rue au Maire (Le Marais), together with a housekeeper, and her son. In May 1792, he preached in several Parisian churches, including Notre-Dame de Paris. According to his own account, Roux sheltered Jean-Paul Marat for six days, when Marat was hiding from the authorities. On 18 August, he was elected to the extraordinary tribunal, followed in September by elections to the departmental electoral assembly and the General Council of the Paris Commune.

== Political activity in Paris ==
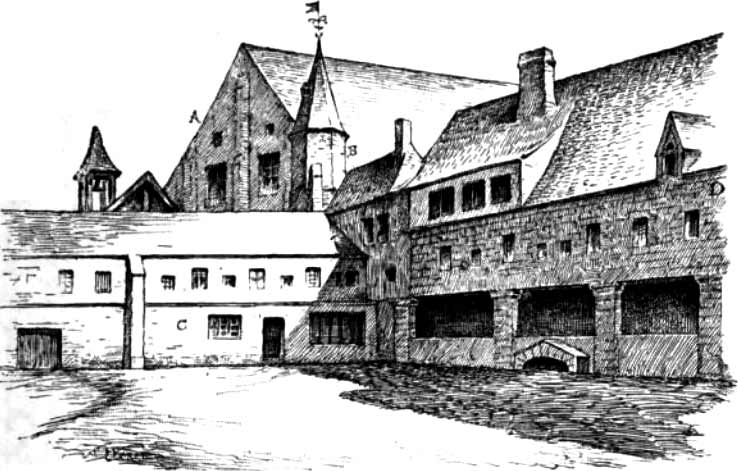
The Cordeliers Convent in 1793

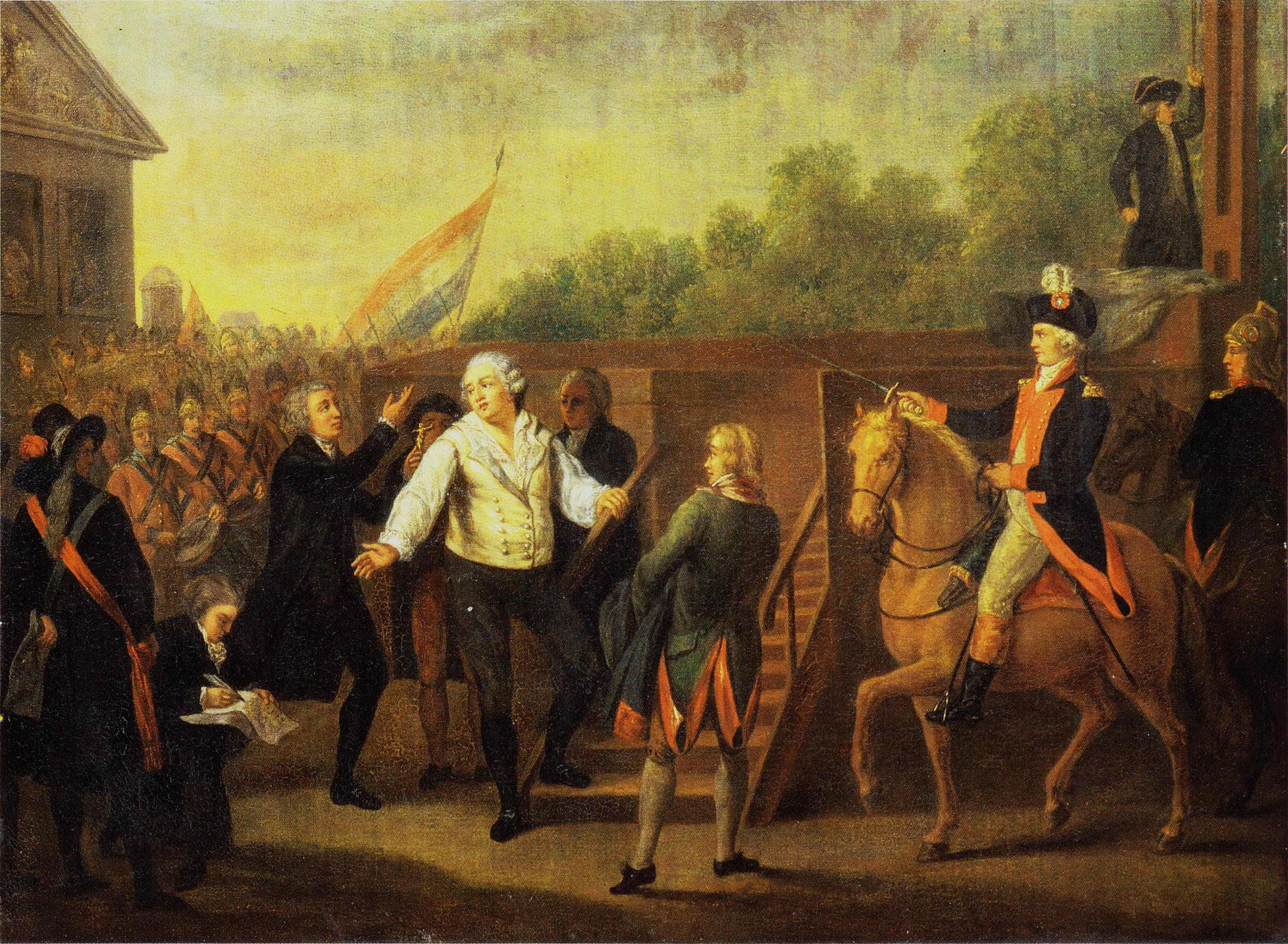
At the lower left Jacques Roux writing the account of the execution of Louis XVI.

By 1792, Roux had become an influential figure in the Section des Gravilliers and was active in the Cordeliers Club and the Paris Commune. In September 1792, he was among the 33 electors chosen by his section to sit in the electoral assembly of Paris.

On 1 December 1792, Roux delivered a speech before the Section de l'Observatoire, calling for action against speculators and hoarders. The section ordered the speech to be printed and circulated to the other 47 Parisian sections, the electoral assembly, patriotic societies, and municipalities of the department.

On 21 January 1793, Roux was one of the municipal officers accompanying Louis XVI to his execution. When Louis asked him to deliver a package to his family, possibly containing his will according to Simon Schama, Roux replied that his mission was limited to escorting him to the scaffold. Louis subsequently handed the package to another officer. Roux later reported on the execution to the General Council of the Paris Commune.

Roux called for severe punishment of hoarders and speculators, and was particularly concerned with keeping bread affordable. According to Robert Barrie Rose, his demands arose primarily from the immediate hardship of the population rather than from a developed economic theory, while his advocacy of fixed prices has been overstated. The Mercure français of 21 February 1793 reported that Roux had called for the publication of lists of suspected profiteers and warned that the people might take matters into their own hands if the legislators failed them. His remarks provoked accusations of inciting insurrection and a heated debate within the Commune. On 23 February, as an officer of the Commune, he presented a proclamation intended to reassure citizens about food supplies. During the disturbances of 25–26 February, when crowds forced shopkeepers to lower their prices, Roux expressed sympathy for popular grievances but subsequently distanced himself from the forcible fixing of prices. On 27 February, the General Council of the Commune recorded a resolution from the Section des Piques calling on the Section des Gravilliers to censure Roux for allegedly justifying the disturbances of 25 February. The Section des Piques also declared that he had lost its confidence.

By the spring of 1793, rising prices, the depreciation of the assignat, unemployment, and food shortages had intensified popular discontent in Paris. By May 1793, the assignat had fallen to 52 per cent of its face value, declining to 36 per cent in June.

== Manifesto of the Enragés ==
On 25 June 1793, a day after the adoption of the French Constitution of 1793, Roux presented an address to the National Convention that became known as the Manifesto of the Enragés. He criticized the new constitution for failing to address food speculation and hoarding, and demanded government intervention to protect the poor from rising prices.

Roux's address provoked growing political opposition. On 26 June, the General Council of the Paris Commune discussed his remarks but took no action against him. On 28 June, Pierre-Gaspard Chaumette accused Roux of encouraging attacks on private property. That evening, Maximilien Robespierre denounced him at the Jacobin Club for undermining the new constitution and dividing the revolutionary movement. On 29 June, Roux was temporarily relieved of his duties as editor of the Commune's public notices, pending an explanation of his conduct. On 30 June, twelve delegates appointed by the Jacobin Club attended a meeting of the Cordeliers Club, where Roux and Leclerc were expelled, while Varlet was temporarily barred from attending meetings pending a membership review. On 1 July, the Commune's General Council formally condemned Roux's conduct. On 7 July, he faced further accusations concerning the misuse of charitable funds.

Marat's residence in the Rue des Cordeliers, Paris, where Jacques Roux confronted him on 9 July 1793, four days before his assassination. Nineteenth-century painting attributed to Karl Fichot.

Following Marat's assassination on 13 July 1793, Roux was questioned by the Committee of General Security the next day. A police report had drawn attention to his recent confrontation with Marat, whom he had visited to demand a retraction of accusations published in his newspaper. Roux denied any knowledge of a plot to assassinate Marat and was released. On 16 July, Roux began publishing a continuation of Marat's newspaper, Le Publiciste de la République française, presenting himself as the deceased journalist's successor. Théophile Leclerc began publishing L'Ami du peuple four days later. On 8 August, Marat's companion, Simonne Évrard, appeared before the National Convention and denounced Roux and Leclerc for claiming to continue Marat's journalism while misrepresenting his political principles. Maximilien Robespierre supported her petition, and the Convention referred the accusations to the Committee of General Security. On 22 August, Roux responded in issue no. 259 of Le Publiciste, under the heading Réponse de l'Ami du Peuple à la soi-disant veuve Marat, challenging Évrard's accusations and her claim to be Marat's widow. He was arrested that same day.

Even while imprisoned, Roux continued publishing Le Publiciste de la République française. In issue no. 268, he denounced arbitrary arrests, restrictions on the meetings of the Parisian sections, and violations of constitutional rights. He also defended the revolutionary women's society against calls for its dissolution and accused political leaders of exploiting radicals such as Leclerc, Varlet, and himself before turning against them.

During the dechristianization campaign in late 1793, his criticism of the traditional clergy became increasingly severe, although he continued to profess his belief in God. His remaining supporters in the Gravilliers section were arrested and imprisoned at La Force Prison in late November.

On 14 January 1794, Roux was brought before the correctional court at the Grand Châtelet to face charges of inciting municipal unrest and undermining constituted authorities. When the magistrates declared themselves incompetent to judge him and referred his case directly to the lethal Revolutionary Tribunal, Roux—knowing the inevitability of the guillotine—drew a blade and stabbed himself several times in the chest. He survived the desperate attempt and was returned to the infirmary at Bicêtre. However, determined to deny the state his public execution, Roux stabbed himself a second time on 10 February, inflicting fatal wounds. He died later that day at the age of 41, and was buried in the cemetery of Gentilly.

== Historiography ==
The historical legacy of the Enragés has long been a subject of intense debate, particularly regarding their place in the genealogy of socialism. In The Holy Family (1845), Karl Marx and Friedrich Engels identified Roux and Jean-Théophile Leclerc as representatives of a revolutionary current that contributed to the emergence of communist ideas and culminated in Gracchus Babeuf's conspiracy. This influential interpretation was later challenged by the Australian historian R. B. Rose, who argued that the Enragés neither advocated the abolition of private property nor developed a coherent communist programme. Rose maintained that their economic demands were primarily reactive measures directed against speculation, profiteering, and the abuse of wealth, while emphasizing the responsibility of government to guarantee subsistence rather than communal ownership. Furthermore, Rose found little evidence of a direct connection between Babeuf and Roux or Leclerc, although he did identify closer political ties between Babeuf and Jean Varlet.

Jacques Roux attracted renewed scholarly attention in the twentieth century, particularly within Marxist historiography. The East German historian Walter Markov devoted extensive research to Roux and the Enragés, publishing both interpretive studies and documentary editions, including Die Freiheiten des Priesters Roux (1967) and Jacques Roux: Scripta et Acta (1969). The American historian Morris Slavin also contributed significantly to this modern reassessment of Roux, notably in his 1964 article "Jacques Roux: A Victim of Vilification", which sought to rescue the priest's reputation from contemporary propaganda.

Later twentieth-century scholars shifted the focus toward popular mentality and cultural conflict. Simon Schama interpreted Roux's fierce attack on economic liberalism as reflecting a broader popular hostility to market mechanisms and a demand for greater state intervention in prices and subsistence. Although he regarded the Enragés as neither profound political thinkers nor particularly successful revolutionary tacticians, he acknowledged that their demands closely reflected popular attitudes towards economic regulation and the punishment of profiteers. By March 1793, they had successfully gained influence among the more militant Parisian sections.

In the twenty-first century, Jonathan Israel portrayed Roux as a radical and largely independent opponent of both the Brissotins and the Montagnards. Israel excelled at emphasizing the plebeian character of the Enragés and their heavy reliance on mass meetings and street agitation, arguing that Roux represented a genuinely left-wing challenge to Robespierre in his defense of the poor against bankers, large merchants, food speculators, and economic exploitation. At the same time, Israel criticized Roux and Varlet for failing to distinguish adequately between large-scale speculators and small shopkeepers and for misdiagnosing the root causes of high prices. Ultimately, Israel did not regard Roux as part of the libertarian current of the Radical Enlightenment, but rather strictly as a socially radical critic of the Revolution's economic inequalities.

Expanding on Roux's personal trajectory, Dominic Rousseau portrayed Roux as a priest whose deep involvement in Parisian revolutionary politics led to his increasing radicalization. He emphasized Roux's opposition to profiteering and high food prices, his demands for economic intervention, and his increasingly outspoken anticlericalism during his final imprisonment, while noting that Roux never abandoned his fundamental belief in God. Rousseau also re-examined the later interpretation of Roux and the Enragés as precursors of socialism, particularly by Karl Marx, but questioned how far this retrospective comparison was historically justified.

== In popular culture ==
In Peter Weiss's 1964 play Marat/Sade, Roux appears as an outspoken former priest who denounces social inequality and the failure of the Revolution to improve the lives of the poor. His speeches call for the opening of grain stores, public ownership of workshops and factories, and an end to war. In Weiss's stage directions, Roux wears a monk-like robe over a hospital shirt whose sleeves are tied together like a straitjacket, restricting his movements. His confinement also serves as a symbol of political repression, as he is repeatedly restrained when attempting to address the audience. In a note accompanying the play, Weiss acknowledged that he had deliberately omitted Marat's break with Roux shortly before the assassination, instead presenting Roux as a radical counterpart against whom Marat's political ideas could be measured.

Roux's radical conviction was later dramatized by Alan Rickman in the BBC television production Revolutionary Witness (1989), performing a specialized monologue written by Peter Barnes. Set on the eve of his fateful appearance before the Revolutionary Tribunal, the performance captures a reflective Roux contemplating his trajectory, the unfolding path of the Revolution, and the enduring plight of the lower classes.

In digital media, Roux surfaces as a non-playable historical character in the action-adventure video game Assassin's Creed Unity (2014), where his character is voiced by the actor Elias Toufexis.

== Bibliography ==
- Berland, André (1990). "Jacques Roux en Saintonge: Les débuts d'un grand révolutionnaire (1752–1790)". Bulletin de la Société d'histoire et d'archéologie en Saintonge maritime (11).
- Guillon, Claude (2009). Notre patience est à bout: Les écrits des Enragés (1792–1793). Paris: IMHO.
- Markov, Walter (1967). Die Freiheiten des Priesters Roux. Berlin: Akademie-Verlag.
- Roux, Jacques (1969). Markov, Walter (ed.). Scripta et acta. Berlin: Akademie-Verlag.
- Rose, R. B. (1965). The Enragés: Socialists of the French Revolution?. Melbourne: Melbourne University Press.
- Rousseau, Dominic (2013). Le curé rouge: Vie et mort de Jacques Roux. Paris: Spartacus. ISBN 978-2-902963-66-9.
- Slavin, Morris (1964). "Jacques Roux: A Victim of Vilification". French Historical Studies. 3 (4): 525–537. doi:10.2307/286155.
