= Red Priests (France) =

Catholic priests who supported the French Revolution

The term "Red Priests" (French: curés rouges) is a modern historiographical term that refers to Catholic priests who, to varying degrees, supported the French Revolution (1789-1799). The term "Red Priests" was coined in 1901 by Gilbert Brégail and later adopted by Edmond Campagnac. However, it is anachronistic because the color red, associated with socialist movements since 1848, did not signify supporters of the French Revolution, who were referred to as "Blues" during the civil wars of 1793–1799, in contrast to the royalist "Whites". Hence, a recent historian suggested using the term "Philosopher Priests" to describe this group, a term used at the time to refer to these priests.

Among the prominent members of this group were Abbé Sieyès, Abbé Grégoire, and Jacques Roux (1752-1794), who committed suicide in prison after being incarcerated on the orders of the Committee of Public Safety led by Robespierre. However, the group included many more members, especially all the priests who took the constitutional oath from 1791 onward, known as "sworn priests" in contrast to "refractory priests". The priests who were deputies to the National Convention and who voted in favour of the death of Louis XVI are also considered as part of this group. A number of priests from this group were extremists during the Reign of Terror.

Often from the lower clergy (parish priests and vicars), they constituted a significant faction within the Catholic Church in France at the beginning of the Revolution. They supported Gallicanism, advocating for the autonomy or even independence of the Catholic Church in France from the Pope. They opposed the privileges of the higher clergy and the nobility, clerical celibacy, and religious intolerance. While some of them left the clergy, often in connection with the criticism of clerical celibacy, a small minority engaged in actions of dechristianization.

== Terminology ==
The term "Red Priests" was first coined by Gilbert Brégail in 1901 and later adopted by Edmond Campagnac in 1913. It has been utilized by academic historians such as Albert Mathiez, Albert Soboul (Marxist historian), and Father Bernard Plongeron from the Catholic Institute of Paris, specialist about the Constitutional Church.

Acknowledging that the term "Red Priests" is an anachronism, some historians, including Annie Geffroy, James C. Scott, and Serge Bianchi, have criticized it. However, these critics do not dispute the existence of this group of clergy in question. Serge Bianchi suggested using the term "Philosopher Priests," which is contemporary and avoids the historical issue associated with the term "Red Priests."

== History ==
=== The Catholic Church in France prior to the crisis of 1788 ===
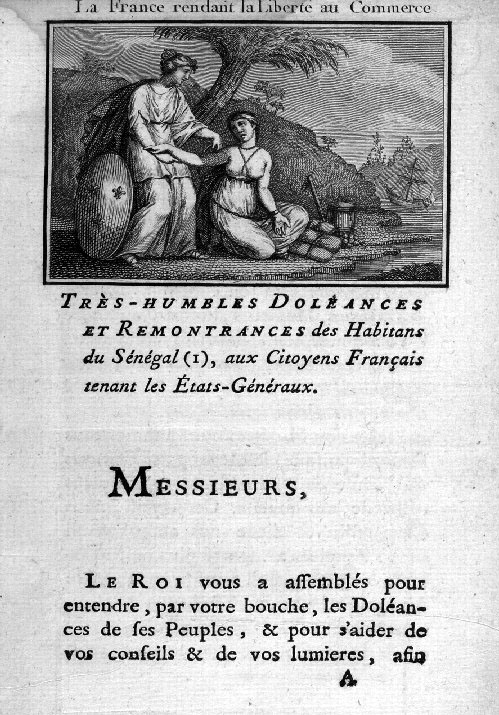
Cahier de doléances of Saint-Louis du Sénégal

Catholicism was the state religion. The Catholic Church in France was deeply divided into various factions on the eve of the French Revolution. In general, bishops and abbots constituted a significant social group, wealthy and closely connected to the ruling elites, enjoying fiscal, economic, judicial, and property privileges. On the other hand, priests, especially those in rural areas or small to medium-sized towns, were generally much more integrated into the living conditions of their parishioners, the Third Estate. They formed a large group within the Catholic Church in France, and a substantial number of these priests were intellectually educated, having access to Enlightenment writings, the Encyclopédie, and, for the most part, the works of Jean-Jacques Rousseau. Many of these priests, monks, and religious leaders were highly critical of various aspects, such as clerical celibacy, leading some to leave the priesthood by getting married. They were also critical of the fact that the Catholic Church was subject to the Pope, perceived as an ally of the counter-revolutionaries. Consequently, they generally supported Gallicanism. Jean-Jacques Rousseau played a particularly significant role in shaping the views of these priests. He advocated for a Christian church free from the "soldiers of the Pontiff," a return to the apostolic prohibition of holy war, expressing it as follows:

Properly understood, this falls under paganism; as the Gospel does not establish a national religion, any sacred war is impossible among Christians. [...] Thus remains the religion of man or Christianity, not the one of today, but that of the Gospel, which is entirely different. Through this holy, sublime, true religion, men, children of the same God, recognized each other as brothers, and the society that united them did not dissolve even in death.

=== From the Estates-General to the Early Days of the Constituent National Assembly (January–July 1789) ===
==== Convocation of the Estates-General ====
In 1788, after several attempts to address the financial crisis of the kingdom, Louis XVI decided to convene the Estates-General, a gathering that had not taken place since 1614. The convocation was announced in December 1788.

The Estates-General was an exceptional assembly bringing together representatives from the three orders of the kingdom: the clergy, the nobility, and the Third Estate. Members of the clergy and nobility were to assemble at the bailiwick capital to elect one deputy each. For the Third Estate, each parish was to elect a delegate, and these delegates, gathered at the bailiwick capital, were to elect two deputies (the principle of the "doubling of the Third Estate", an innovation of 1789). Elections were to be accompanied, in each parish and at the bailiwick capital, by the drafting of lists of grievances (cahiers de doléances) that the deputies were to bring to Versailles".

The Tennis Court Oath by Jacques-Louis David (1791), depicting in the center, in the foreground, the priest Henri Grégoire, the Carthusian monk Dom Gerle, and the Protestant pastor Rabaut-Saint-Étienne embracing.

=== Drafting of Grievance Lists (Cahiers de doléances) ===
Priests played a central role in drafting cahiers de doléances in their parishes because they were often the only ones who could read and write well, and they managed parish registers (baptisms, marriages, burials).

They also contributed to the drafting of cahiers de doléances for the clergy, their own order, where they were in the majority. Thus, one can find demands similar to those of the Third Estate in their cahiers de doléances, as in the case of Forcalquier:

Consideration should be given in the distribution of benefits and other ecclesiastical graces, based on service and merit rather than birth. [...] We will seek the easing of taxes weighing on the poor people, such as those on leather, unheard-of and ruinous domain rights, and controls. [...] One of the most pressing needs of the Kingdom is the reform of justice, both civil and criminal. [...] Priests, pastors, are the fathers of the poor. Their sad condition deserves a place in the grievance list. The hardworking day laborer, for whom work is not sufficient, and the poor widow burdened with children have no resources other than the charity of their pastors. Our deputies will be our spokespeople and will obtain, for the unfortunate, relief from all burdens. [...] To abolish the use of lettres de cachet and to lift those that have been issued in the past.

=== Election of Clergy Deputies ===
Priests and vicars (the lower clergy) were favored by the election process. The clergy was given to elect 296 deputies.

At the end of the electoral process, 47 bishops out of 130 were elected, but priests and vicars were much more numerous, with 208 elected (70% of the 296). Most of them were priests critical of the privileges of the clergy.

There were also priests elected as deputies of the Third Estate, notably Abbé Sieyès, the author of "What is the Third Estate?" and "Essay on Privileges," one of the central figures in the early stages of the French Revolution, directly elected by the Third Estate.

=== The Conflict between the Estates-General and the King (May 5 - July 9, 1789) ===
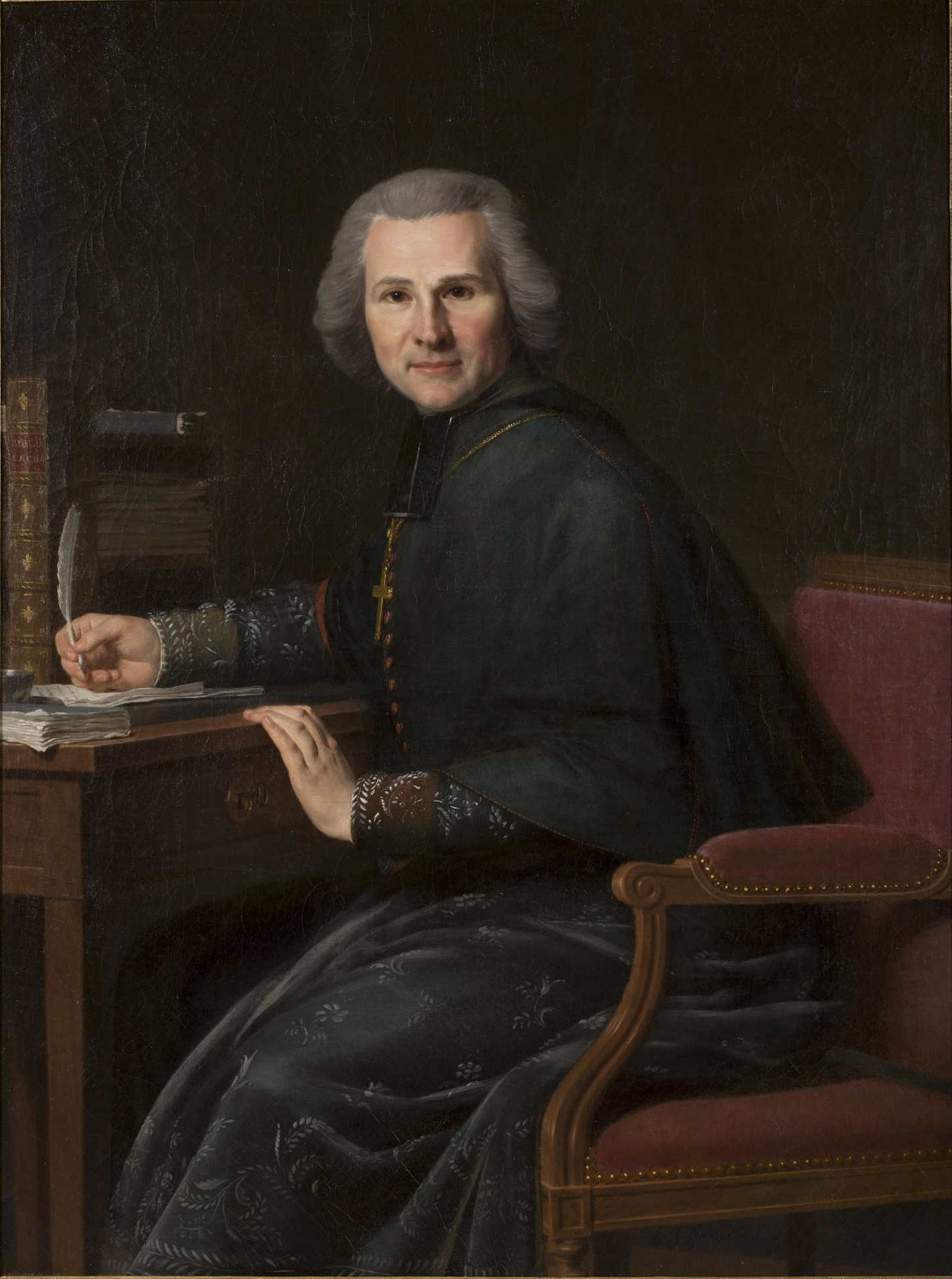
Portrait of Abbé Grégoire by Pierre Joseph Célestin François (1800), Museum of Lorraine, Nancy.

The clergy deputies convened at the Estates-General, with 114 out of 133 advocating for voting by head and the clergy's alignment with the Third Estate, as proposed by Abbé Sieyès, representing slightly less than half. Since the motion was initially rejected, 19 of them joined the Third Estate starting from June 13.

Father René Lecesve of Saint Triaire, Father David Pierre Ballard de Poiré, and Father Jacques Jallet de Chérigné, three priests from Poitou, were the first to align themselves with the Third Estate, declaring that they came "preceded by the torch of reason, guided by the love of the public good, and the cry of our consciences, placing ourselves with our fellow citizens and brothers." Abbé Grégoire quickly followed suit. On June 19, the clergy reintroduced the motion, which was accepted by 149 votes out of 296, giving the majority to the dissenting deputies and allowing them to proclaim themselves the National Assembly. On June 20, many priests participated in the Oath of the Tennis Court.

=== Beginnings of the Constituent National Assembly (July 1789) ===
On July 9, Louis XVI acknowledged the National Assembly proclaimed by the deputies of the Third Estate as the Constituent National Assembly, tasked with drafting a constitution for France.

On July 14, 1789, the storming of the Bastille took place by the Parisian people, partly inspired by Claude Fauchet, an openly revolutionary clergyman.

The same day, Abbé Grégoire presided over the Constituent National Assembly for a session lasting sixty-two hours. He delivered a speech against the enemies of the Nation.

In the days that followed, he proposed the abolition of primogeniture, then suggested the abolition of all privileges and the abandonment of the censitary suffrage in favor of universal manhood suffrage; on this last point, he was supported only by Maximilien de Robespierre, and his motion was rejected.

=== Constitutional Monarchy ===
In Paris itself, the revolutionary clergy wielded influence, particularly within religious orders such as the Augustinians, Carthusians, Dominicans, or Carmelites. For example, Father François-Valentin Mulot, an Augustinian, served in the Paris Commune (1789). The Carthusians and Carmelites blessed tricolor flags, and the Dominicans participated in the establishment of revolutionary clubs like the Jacobin Club and the Breton Club. In the vicinity of Paris, as in Melun, other priests acted in support of the French Revolution, like Father Romain Pichonnier d'Andrezel, who founded a branch of the Society of Friends of the Constitution (the official name of the Jacobin Club) there. In a speech in Caen in 1791, he expressed himself as follows:

Receive the homage of a heart that shares with you the glory of having seen the scepter of tyrants broken and the happiness of now living under laws dictated by reason and enshrined in evangelical morality.

Percentage of priests agreeing with the Civil Constitution of the Clergy by department, 1791

Father Romain Pichonnier is a striking example of a red priest; from the early days of 1789, he advocated for the election of priests by the faithful and bishops by the priests. He remained loyal to the Jacobins until his death from illness in 1792, expressing frustration with the slow progress of both the trial of Louis XVI and the production of pikes. Despite the involvement of the Parisian region, many dissenting priests from rural or small to medium-sized towns came from all over France. Among them was Deputy Dom Gerle, prior of the Chartreuse de Port-Sainte-Marie, who later renounced his vows and monastic life due to his extreme mystical opinions, or Eulogius Schneider, a German Franciscan priest and translator of John Chrysostom, who supported the French Revolution, ran a radical journal called 'Argos', and served as public prosecutor of the Criminal Tribunal of Strasbourg. He also renounced his vows to marry, reflecting the opposition frequently shared by red priests to clerical celibacy.

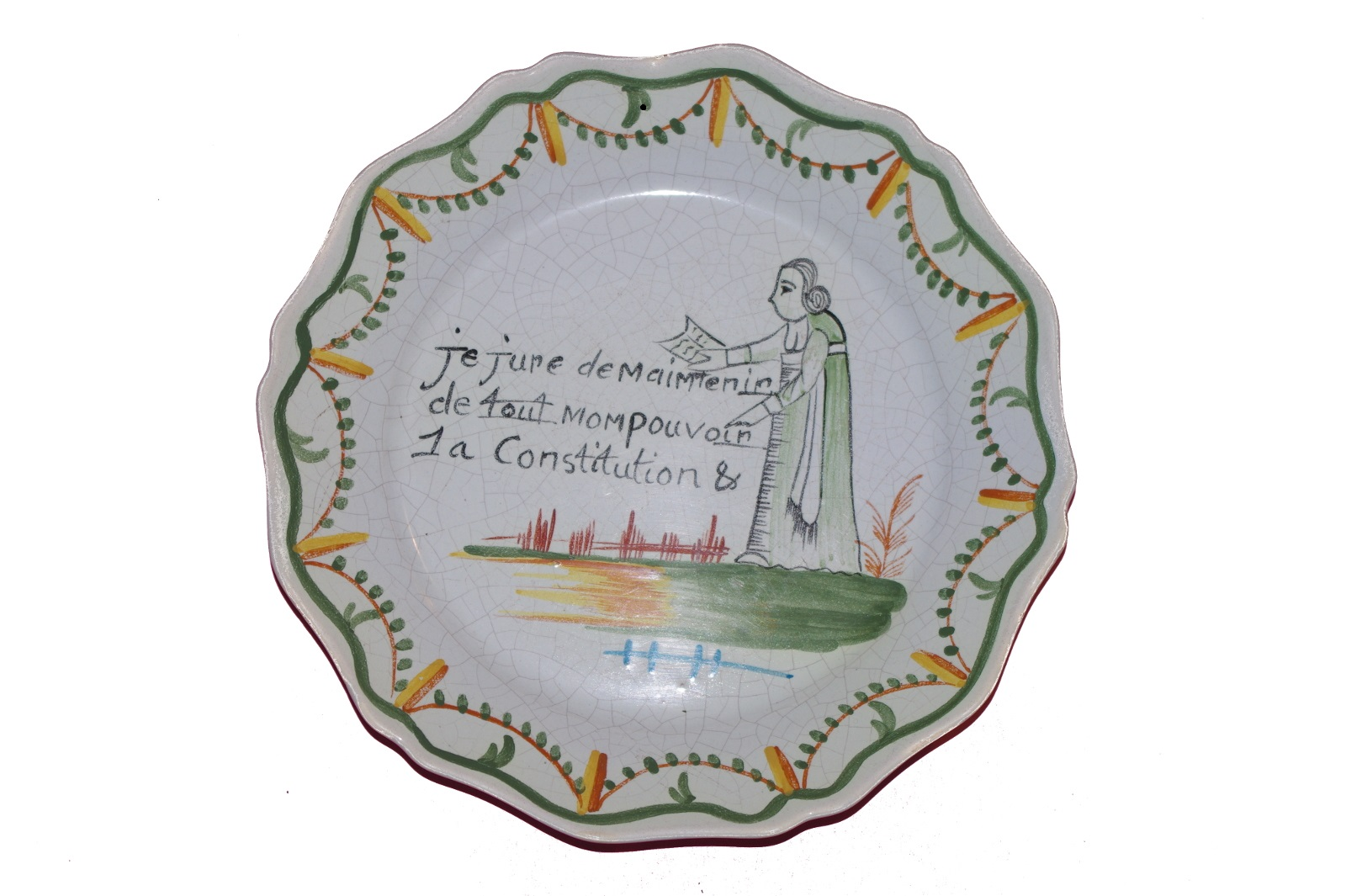
A 'jureur' (meaning supporting the Civil Constitution of the Clergy) priest on a plate from the French Revolution/beginning of the 19th century

Generally, the red priests were fervent supporters of the Civil Constitution of the Clergy, of which they were partial drafters. About 50% of the priests of the Catholic Church in France rallied to the Constitutional Church, exceeding 80% in 27 departments. In the list of clergy deputies who adhered to the Civil Constitution of the Clergy, we find, among others, Father Lancelot de Retiers in Ille-et-Vilaine, who firmly attached his region to the French Revolution. His epitaph dating back to 1806 reads: "Here lies Sir Jos. Lancelot, member of the Constituent Assembly, vicar general of the diocese, father of several councils, president of this canton."

In this same list, we also find Father Jean-Baptiste Pierre Saurine, deputy from the Landes; Father Jean-Joseph Rigouard, deputy from Toulon; Father Jean Louis Gouttes, deputy from Béziers; Father Jean-Baptiste Dumouchel, rector of the University of Paris and deputy from Paris; Father Jean Paul Marie Anne Latyl, deputy from Paris; Father Dominique Dillon, priest of Pouzauges and deputy from the Vendée; Father Jean-Baptiste Aubry, priest of Véel and deputy from the Meuse; Father de Marsai, deputy from Loudun; Father Alexandre Thibaut, deputy from Seine-et-Marne; Father Thomas Lindet, deputy from the Eure; Father Aimé Favre, priest of Hotonnes and deputy from the Bugey; Father Chouvet, priest of Chaulniélac and deputy from the Ardèche; Dom Claude-François Verguet, a Cistercian monk and deputy from Saint Pol de Léon, future administrator of Haute-Saône during the Reign of Terror; Father Guy Bouillote, priest of Arnay-le-Duc and deputy from Auxois; Father François Bucaille, priest of Fréthun and deputy from Pas de Calais; or finally, Father Rousselot, deputy from the Haute-Saône.

=== Trial of Louis XVI and First Republic ===
Many red priests voted for the death of Louis XVI during his trial, just like Father Jean Bassal, the parish priest of Versailles and deputy from Seine-et-Oise, who voted for the death of the king, against reprieve and against appealing to the people. However, he protected a refractory priest and Marat at his home. While sent as a representative on a mission during the Reign of Terror to suppress disturbances, Jean Bassal was noted for his humanity. Father Pierre Jacques Michel Chasles, deputy from Eure-et-Loir, similarly voted after saying, "I do not hesitate to say, in front of the homeland, in the presence of the image of Brutus, before my own conscience, that the moment when the Assembly rejected the proposal for an appeal to the primary assemblies seemed to me a day of triumph for freedom and equality, for the salvation of the Republic." By his side was Father Capuchin François Chabot, deputy from Loir-et-Cher, who voted for the king's death, expressing himself in this way:

If I wanted to modify my opinion, cloud it in some way, I could also ask that Louis be required to declare his accomplices, and that they be led to the same guillotine. But I do not place any restrictions on my judgment, and I pronounce death because Louis has been a tyrant, because he still is, because he could become one again. The blood of the tyrant must cement the Republic. I vote for death.

With them also voted Father Jacques Louis Dupont, a member of the congregation of the Christian Doctrine and deputy from Indre-et-Loire. However, he was absent due to illness during the nominal vote, as was Father André Foussedoire, deputy from Loir-et-Cher, a Montagnard, and later a Cretois, who voted for death, saying: "I have always abhorred the shedding of blood, but reason and justice must guide me. Louis was guilty of high treason; I recognized it yesterday. Today, to be consistent, I must pronounce death." The Montagnard Father Léonard Honoré Gay de Vernon, parish priest of Compreignac and deputy from Haute-Vienne, voted for the death of the king, against reprieve and against the appeal to the people. After becoming the bishop of Haute-Vienne, he sold his pectoral cross to support revolutionary armies and replaced it with a wooden cross. During the nominal call, he remained laconic, contenting himself with "Louis deserved death; I vote for death." Father Pierre Gibergues, deputy from Puy-de-Dôme, supported death, although he was a member of the Plain.

Other clergymen also voted for death, such as the Oratorian priest Pierre Ichon, deputy from Gers, or the Benedictine monk Jacques Léonard Laplanche, deputy from Nièvre, who declared, "I vote for death, and, as a measure of general safety, I vote for the short delay."

Among the clergymen who voted for the death of Louis XVI, there was also the Doctrinaire Father Joseph Lakanal, deputy from Ariège, who voted for death after declaring, "A true republican speaks little. The reasons for my decision are here (pointing to his heart); I vote for death." Father Louis-Félix Roux, deputy from Haute-Marne, expressed himself as follows:

A tyrant once said he wanted the Roman people to have only one head so that it could be struck off in a single blow; Louis Capet, as much as it was in his power, executed this atrocious desire. I voted for death. Avenger of two free peoples, I had only one regret, that the same blow could not strike the head of all tyrants.

Finally, there were Father François-Toussaint Villers, deputy from Loire-Inférieure, and Father Claude-Alexandre Ysabeau, deputy from Indre-et-Loire. Ysabeau declared, "A tyrant does not resemble a man; I vote for death," while Villers said, "I vote for a terrible punishment, but one indicated by the law, death." The bishop and deputy of Oise, Jean-Baptiste Massieu, also voted for death, affirming:

I would believe I failed in justice, in the present and future safety of the homeland, if, by my vote, I contributed to prolonging the existence of the cruelest enemy of justice, laws, and humanity; accordingly, I voted for death.

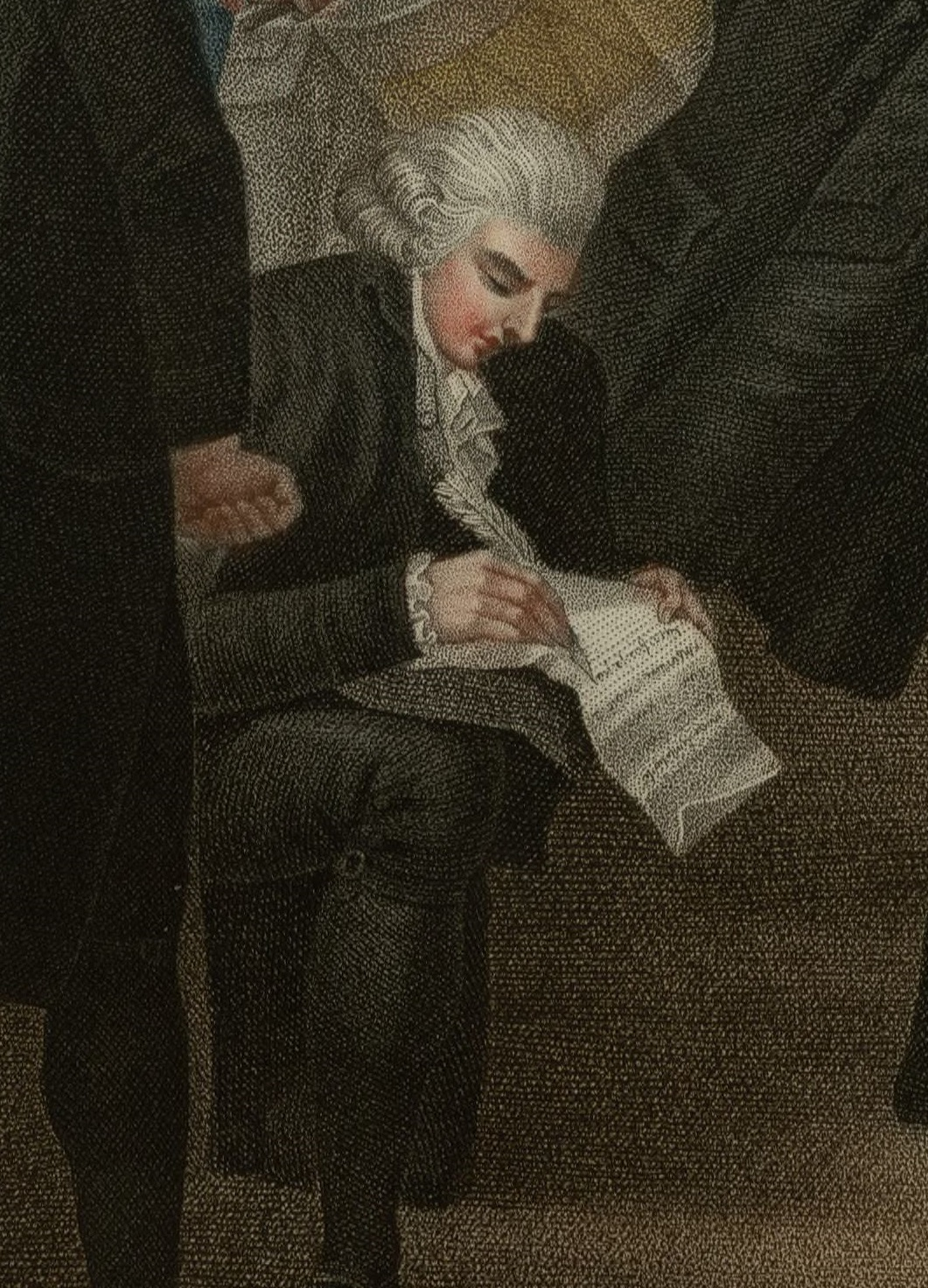
Artist's depiction of Jacques Roux drafting the report on the execution of Louis XVI, on January 21, 1793. Detail from an engraving by J.-Frédéric Cazenave after Charles Benazech, BnF, 1795.

Alongside the trial of Louis XVI, in which many red priests participated, they were crucial in the radicalization of the Parisian people. One of them, Father Jacques Roux, the parish priest of the church of Saint-Nicolas-des-Champs, engaged from 1791 and increasingly until his execution in impassioned speeches directed at the sans-culottes. He participated in the Insurrection of August 10, 1792. A member of the Enragés faction, he was generally considered one of the most radical politicians of the First Republic, attacking the Jacobins for their 'moderation'. On February 25, 1793, he excited the Parisian people to loot Parisian shops. Jacques Roux called for the abolition of private property and the confiscation of the property of aristocrats, a rare and extreme position even within the Mountain, and reportedly declared, "Liberty is but an empty phantom when one class of men can starve another with impunity." For his extremism, he was targeted by the Committee of Public Safety during the Terror, appeared before the Criminal Court, which declared itself incompetent, and referred him to the Revolutionary Tribunal. He committed suicide before his execution. He was one of the most well-known figures among the red priests.

Some of the red priests adopted revolutionary names under the First Republic and the Terror; Father Dauphin-Français, Father Payelle Jean-Jacques, Father Saint-Didier-Sans-Culotte, Father Chalon-Gracchus, Father Gilard-Brutus Mucius Scaevola were good examples of these renamed priests. While some of them renounced priesthood and left the clergy by renouncing Christianity, a substantial number of them followed the position of Abbé Grégoire and remained clergy and Christians or adopted a sort of syncretism between republican values and religious values. It seemed that the red priests were strongly opposed to religious intolerance, particularly directed towards Jews or Protestants.

== Legacy ==
The expression could be used in other situations, such as during the Russian Revolution of 1905, supported by a portion of the clergy of the Russian Orthodox Church. Jean Jaurès took an interest in Jacques Roux and designated February 25, 1793, as Jacques Roux Day. Marcel Pagnol and Charles Péguy cite them as the "saints without hope" of the French Republic. Victor Hugo mentions them when he described the National Convention, in his last novel, "Quatrevingt-treize" (English : Ninety-Three) which explores the period of the Reign of Terror:

The imprecations exchanged retorts. — Conspirator! — Assassin! — Scoundrel! — Factious! — Moderate! — Accusations hurled at the bust of Brutus standing there. Apostrophes, insults, challenges. Furious glares from one side to the other, fists raised, glimpses of pistols, daggers half-drawn. Massive blaze from the platform. Some spoke as if they were leaning against the guillotine. Heads swayed, terrified and terrible. Montagnards, Girondins, Feuillants, moderates, terrorists, Jacobins, Cordeliers; eighteen regicide priests.

All these men! A heap of smoke driven in all directions. Spirits at the mercy of the wind.

But this wind was a wind of wonder.

To be a member of the Convention was to be a wave of the ocean.
