= Insurrection of 31 May – 2 June 1793 =

Anti-Girondin coup in France

Insurrection of 31 May – 2 June
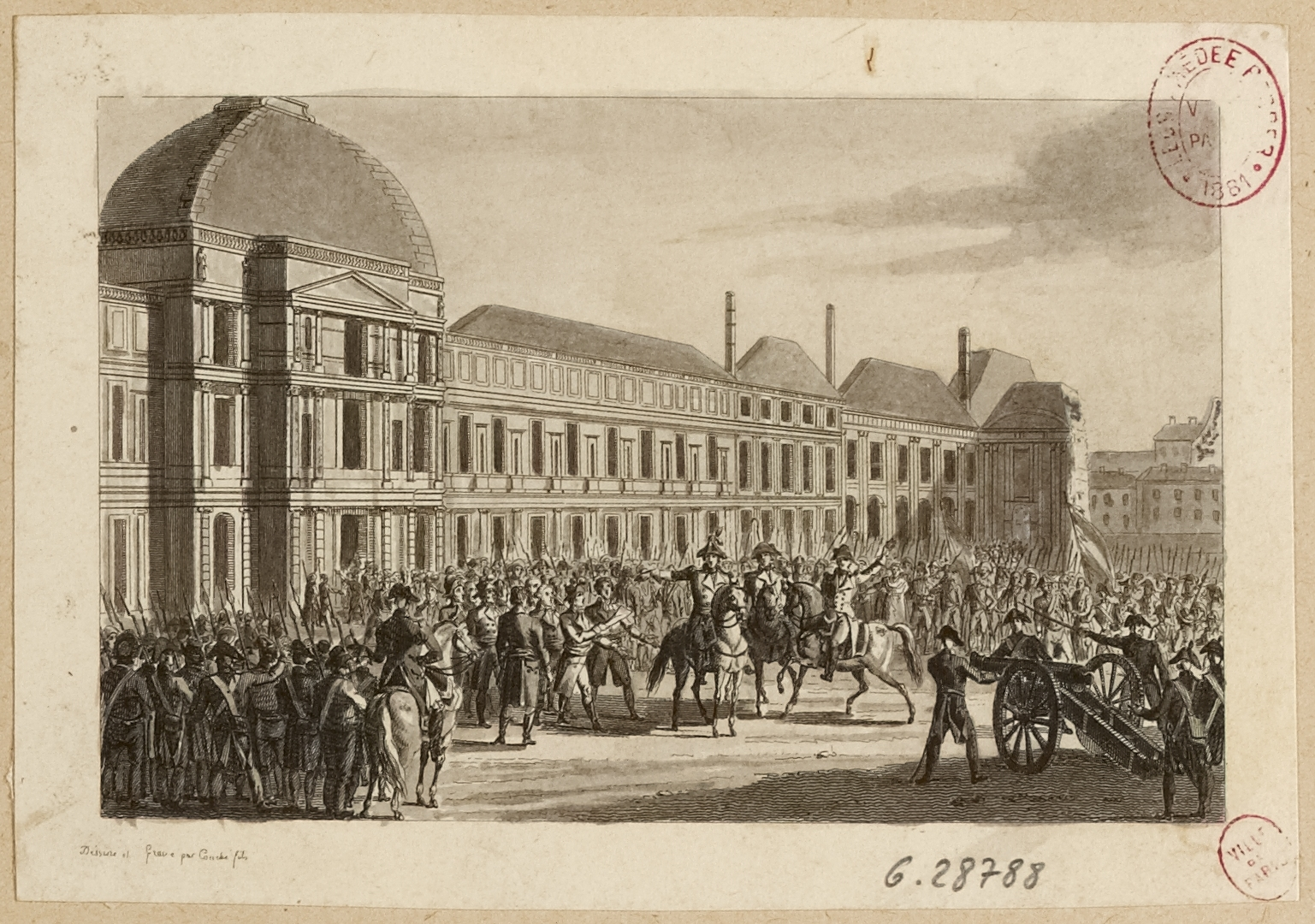
- Hanriot confronts deputies of the Convention.
Date	31 May – 2 June 1793
Location	Paris, France
Result	Girondins purged from the National Convention; Centralization of power under the Committee of Public Safety; Beginning of the Reign of Terror; Outbreak of the Federalist revolts

Belligerents
Paris Commune: Sans-culottes; Jacobins; Montagnards; Hébertists; Enragés; National Guard	National Convention: Girondins

Commanders and leaders
François Hanriot; Jean-Paul Marat; Maximilien Robespierre; Jacques Hébert; Jean-François Varlet; Jacques-Nicolas Billaud-Varenne; Jacques Roux; Bertrand Barère	Jacques Pierre Brissot (executed); P. V. Vergniaud (executed); Armand Gensonné (executed); C. J. M. Barbaroux (executed); Marguerite-Élie Guadet (executed); Claude Fauchet (executed); Maximin Isnard; François Buzot

The insurrection of 31 May – 2 June 1793 (French: Journées du 31 mai et du 2 juin 1793, lit. 'Days of 31 May and 2 June 1793') during the French Revolution started after the Paris Commune demanded that 22 Girondin deputies and members of the Commission of Twelve be brought before the Revolutionary Tribunal. Jean-Paul Marat led the attack on the representatives in the National Convention, who in January had voted against the execution of King Louis XVI and since then had paralyzed the convention. It ended after thousands of armed citizens surrounded the convention to force it to deliver the deputies denounced by the Commune. The insurrection resulted in the fall of 29 Girondins and two ministers under pressure of the sans-culottes, Jacobins, and Montagnards.

Because of its impact and importance, the insurrection stands as one of the three great popular insurrections of the French Revolution, following the storming of the Bastille and the insurrection of 10 August 1792. The principal conspirators were the Enragés: Claude-Emmanuel Dobsen and Jean-François Varlet. Jean-Nicolas Pache and Pierre Gaspard Chaumette led the march on the convention.

== Background ==
During the government of the Legislative Assembly (October 1791–September 1792), the Girondins had dominated French politics. After the insurrection of 10 August 1792 and the start of the National Convention in September 1792, the Girondin faction (c. 150) was larger than the Montagnards (c. 120), the other main faction of the convention. Most ministries were in the hands of friends or allies of the Girondins, and the state bureaucracy and the provinces remained under their control.

The convention was expected to deliver a new constitution, as the 10 August insurrection had rejected the Constitution of 1791. However, by the spring of 1793, the convention was instead dealing with civil war, imminent invasion, difficulties, and dangers.

== Toward the crisis ==
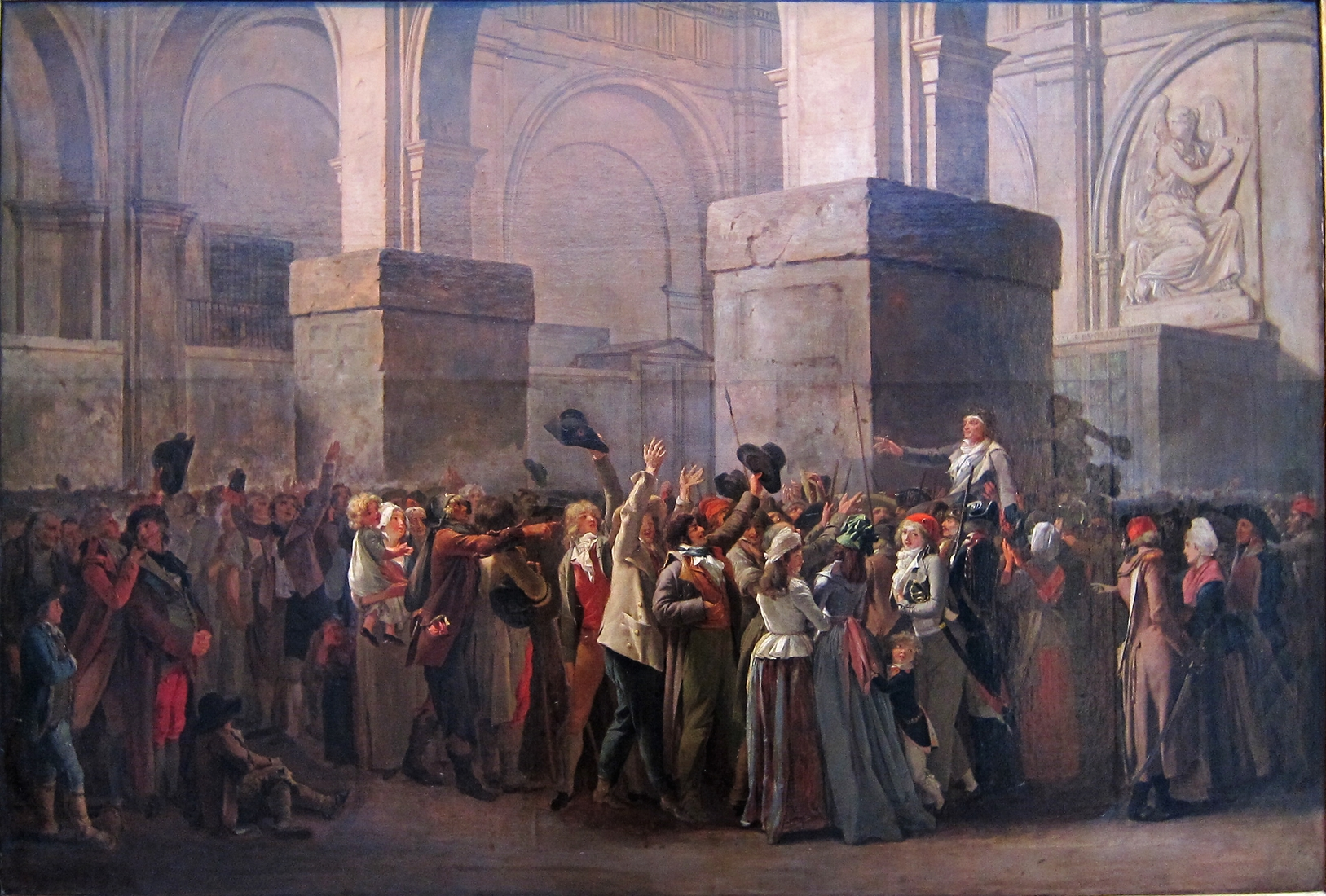
The Triumph of Marat, Louis-Léopold Boilly, 1794

On 26 May, after a week of silence, Maximilien Robespierre delivered one of the most decisive speeches of his career. He openly called at the Jacobin Club "to place themselves in insurrection against corrupt deputies". Maximin Isnard declared that the convention would not be influenced by any violence and that Paris had to respect the representatives from elsewhere in France. The Convention decided Robespierre would not be heard. (During the whole debate Robespierre sat on the gallery.) The atmosphere became extremely agitated. Some deputies were willing to kill if Isnard dared to declare civil war in Paris; the president was asked to give up his seat.

The Convention caved to pressure and released Claude-Emmanuel Dobsen and Jean-François Varlet on 27 May, three days after their arrest. On 28 May a weak Robespierre excused himself twice for his physical condition but attacked in particular Jacques Pierre Brissot of royalism. He referred to 25 July 1792 where their points of view split. Robespierre left the convention after applause from the left side and went to the town hall. There he called for an armed insurrection against the majority of the convention. "If the Commune does not unite closely with the people, it violates its most sacred duty", he said. In the afternoon the Commune demanded the creation of a Revolutionary army of sansculottes in every town of France, including 20,000 men to defend Paris. 29 May was occupied in preparing the public mind, according to historian François Mignet.

== Thursday, 30 May ==
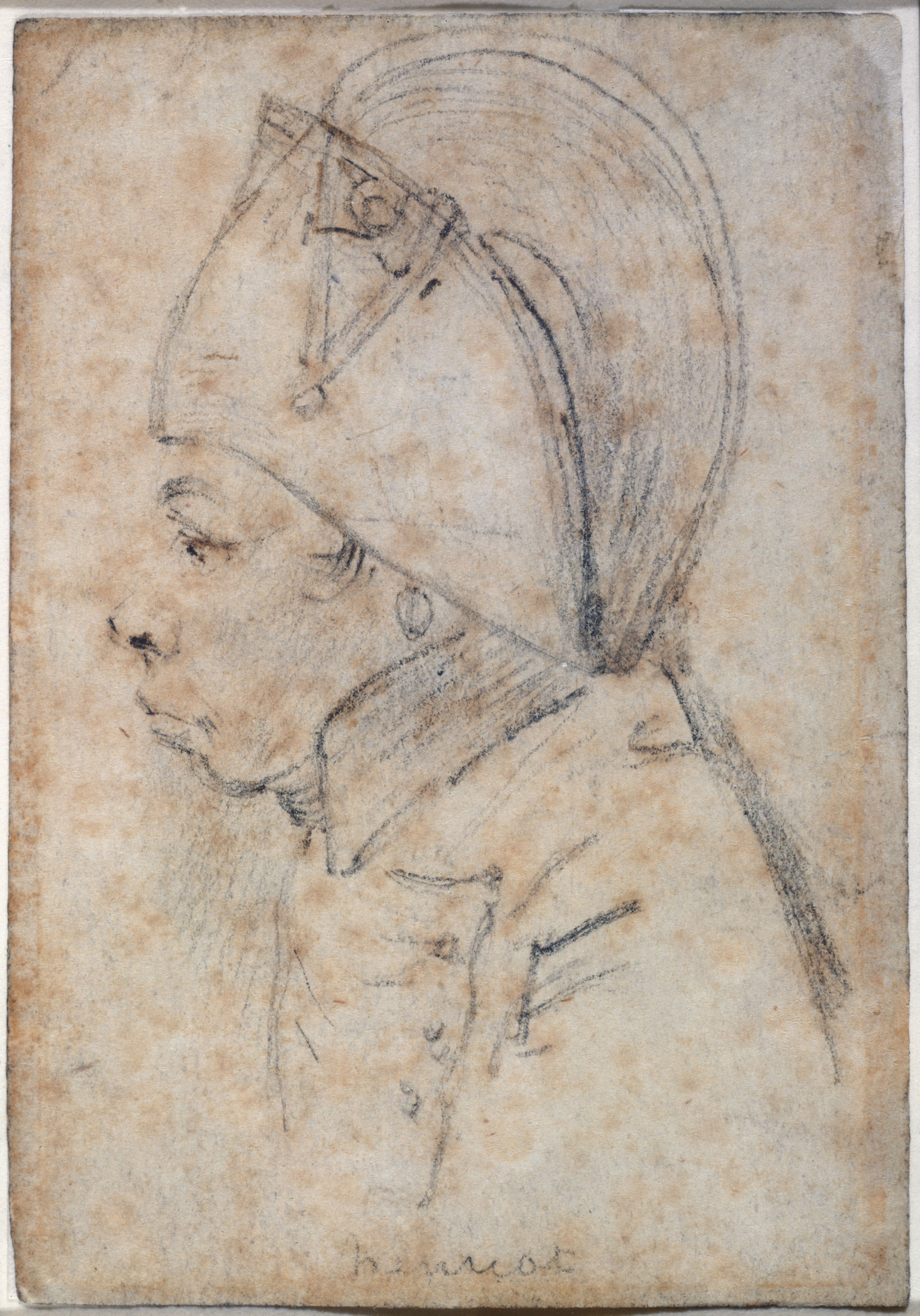
François Hanriot chef de la section des Sans-Culottes (Rue Mouffetard); drawing by Gabriel in the Carnavalet Museum

Delegates representing 33 of the sections met at the Évêché (the Bishop's Palace behind the Notre-Dame de Paris) declared themselves in a state of insurrection against the aristocratic factions and the oppression of liberty. A committee of nine, including Varlet and Dobsen, was appointed to lead the revolt.

On the same day, several new members were added to the Committee of Public Safety: Louis Antoine de Saint-Just, Georges Couthon, and Hérault de Seychelles. The Department of Paris gave its support to the movement, and in name of the sections François Hanriot was appointed "Commandant-General" of the Parisian National Guard by the vice-president of the convention. At 3 p.m., the tocsin in the Notre-Dame was rung, in the streets barriers were erected and the city gates were closed. The insurrection was directed by the committee at the Évêché (the Bishop's Palace Committee).

== Friday, 31 May ==
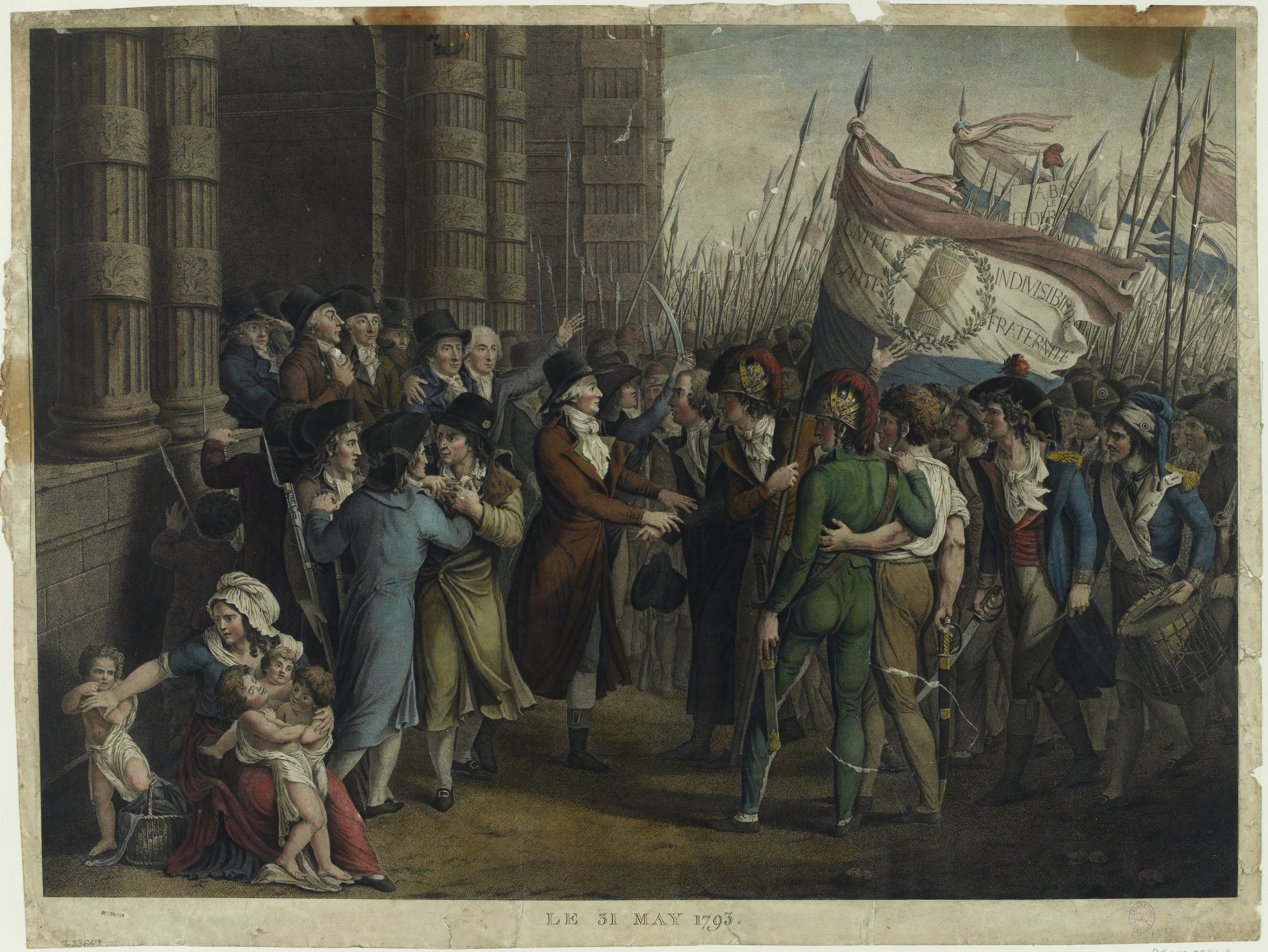
The uprising of the Parisian sans-culottes from 31 May to 2 June 1793. The scene takes place in front of the Deputies Chamber in the Tuileries. The depiction shows Marie-Jean Hérault de Séchelles and Pierre Victurnien Vergniaud.

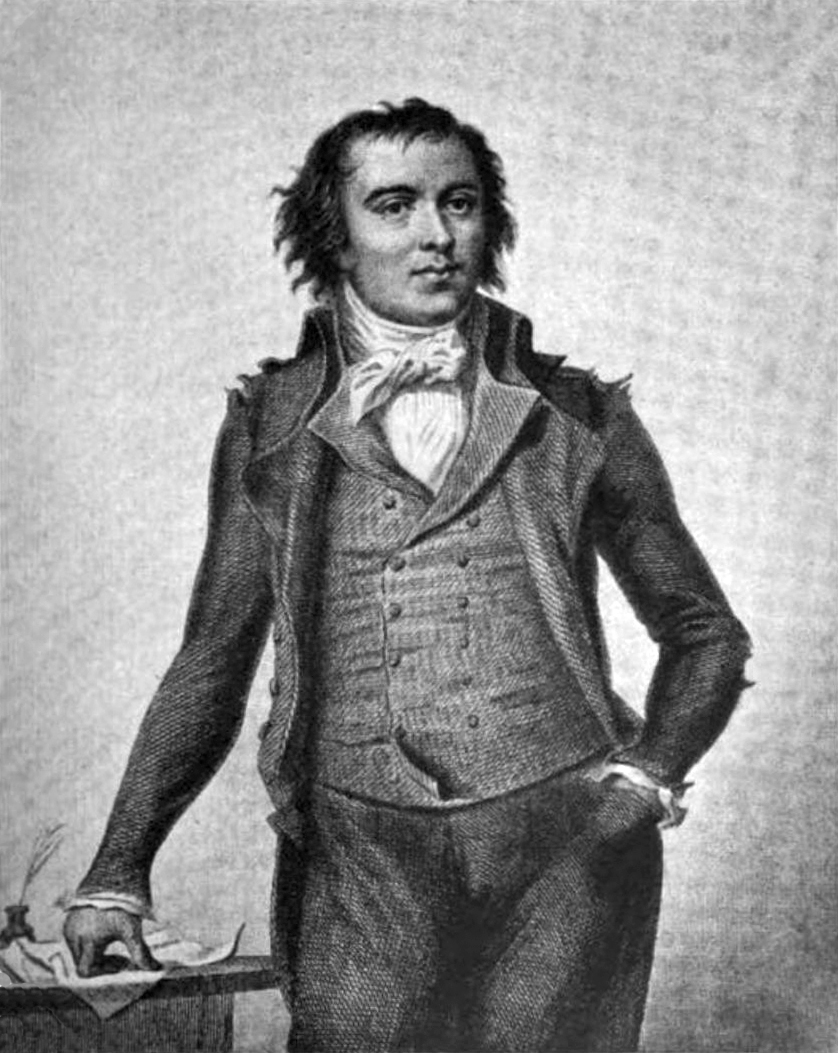
Pierre Vergniaud

At 6 a.m., the delegates of the 33 sections, led by Dobsen, fired the alarm-gun, presented themselves at the Hôtel de Ville, showed the full powers with which the members had invested them, and suppressed the Commune, whose members had retired to the adjourning room. The revolutionary delegates provisionally reinstated the Commune in its functions, dissolved the general council of the Commune, and immediately reconstituted it, requiring members to take a new oath. Mayor Jean-Nicolas Pache was dismissed or refused. They ordered the arrest of Pierre Henri Hélène Marie Lebrun-Tondu, Etienne Clavière and Jean-Marie Roland.

The insurgent committee, which was sitting at the Hôtel de Ville, dictated to the Commune what measures it was to take. It secured the nomination of Hanriot as sole commander-in-chief of the National Guard of Paris. It was decided that the poorer National Guards who were under arms should receive pay at the rate of 40 sous a day. The assembly of the Parisian authorities, summoned by the departmental assembly, resolved to cooperate with the Commune and the insurrectionary committee, whose numbers were raised to 21 by the addition of delegates from the meeting at the Jacobins.

The Conseil-General ordered that the tocsin in the Notre-Dame should stop ringing. The sections were very slow in getting under way, as the workers were at their jobs. Hanriot ordered a cannon fired on the Pont-Neuf as a sign of alarm. When the Convention assembled, Georges Danton rushed to the tribune, allegedly saying,

Break up the Commission of Twelve! You have heard the thunder of the cannon. Girondins protested against the closing of the city gates, against the tocsin and alarm-gun without the approval of the convention; Vergniaud suggested arresting Henriot. In his turn, Robespierre urged the arrest of the Girondins, who had supported the installation of the Commission of Twelve.

Around 10 a.m., 12,000 armed citizens appeared to protect the Convention against the arrest of Girondin deputies. At about 5 p.m., petitioners from the sections and the Commune appeared at the bar of the convention. They demanded that 22 Girondin deputies and members of the Commission of Twelve be brought before the Revolutionary Tribunal, a central revolutionary army be raised, the price of bread be fixed at three sous a pound, nobles holding senior rank in the army be dismissed, armories be created for arming the sans-culottes, the departments of France be purged, suspects be arrested, the right to vote provisionally be reserved to sans-culottes only, and a fund be set apart for the relatives of those defending their country and for the relief of the aged and infirm.

The petitioners made their way into the hall and sat down beside the Montagnards. Robespierre ascended the Tribune and supported the suppression of the commissions. When Pierre Victurnien Vergniaud called upon him to conclude, Robespierre turned towards him and allegedly said,

Yes, I will conclude, but it will be against you! Against you, who, after the revolution of 10 August, wanted to send those responsible for it to the scaffold; against you, who have never ceased to incite to the destruction of Paris; against you, who wanted to save the tyrant; against you, who conspired with Dumouriez ... Well, my conclusion is the prosecution of all Dumouriez's accomplices and all those whose names have been mentioned by the petitioners ...

To this Vergniaud did not reply. The Convention suppressed the Commission of Twelve and approved the ordinance of the Commune, granting two livres a day to workmen under arms. Yet, the rising of 31 May ended unsatisfactorily. That evening at the Commune, Chaumette and Dobsen were accused by Varlet of weakness. Robespierre had declared from the Tribune that the journée of 31 May was not enough. At the Jacobins club, Jacques-Nicolas Billaud-Varenne echoed the sentiment, supposedly saying, "Our country is not saved; there were important measures of public safety that had to be taken; it was today that we had to strike the final blows against factionalism". The Commune, declaring itself duped, demanded and prepared a "supplement" to the revolution.

== Saturday, 1 June ==
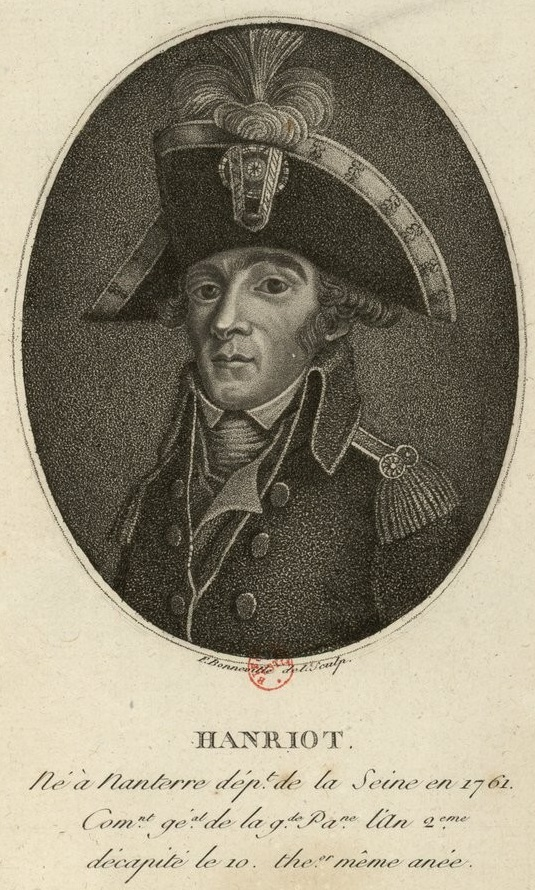
François Hanriot

On Saturday, the Commune gathered almost all day, devoted to the preparation of a great movement to the Vendée, according to historian François Mignet. The National Guard remained under arms. Jean-Paul Marat repaired to the Hôtel de Ville, Paris and gave, with emphatic solemnity, a "counsel" to the people—namely, to remain at the ready and not to quit until victory was theirs. He climbed to the belfry of the town hall and rang the tocsin. The Convention broke the session at 6 p.m., at the time when the Commune was to present a new petition against the 22 Girondins. At the tocsin sound, it assembled again, and the petition demanding the arrest of the Girondins was referred to the Committee of Public Safety for examination and report within three days. It ordered Hanriot to surround the Convention "with a respectable armed force".

In the evening, 40,000 men surrounded the National Palace to force the arrest of the deputies. At 9 p.m., the convention, presided over by Henri Grégoire, opened the session. Marat led the attack on the Girondin representatives, who in January had voted against immediate execution of the king and since then had paralyzed the convention. Several were accused of corresponding with General Dumouriez, who since his defection in early April was seen as a traitor to the Revolution. The Committee of Public Safety postponed decisions on the accused deputies for three days, even though Marat demanded a decision within a day. Unsatisfied with the result, the Commune demanded and prepared a "Supplement" to the revolution.

During the night of 1–2 June, the insurrectionary committee by agreement with the Commune ordered Hanriot to "surround the Convention with an armed force sufficient to command respect, in order that the chiefs of the faction may be arrested during the day, in case the Convention refused to accede to the request of the citizens of Paris". Orders were given to suppress the Girondin newspapers and arrest their editors. The Comité insurrectionnel ordered the arrest of ministers Jean-Marie Roland and Étienne Clavière. That night, Paris changed into a military camp, according to author Otto Flake.

== Sunday, 2 June ==
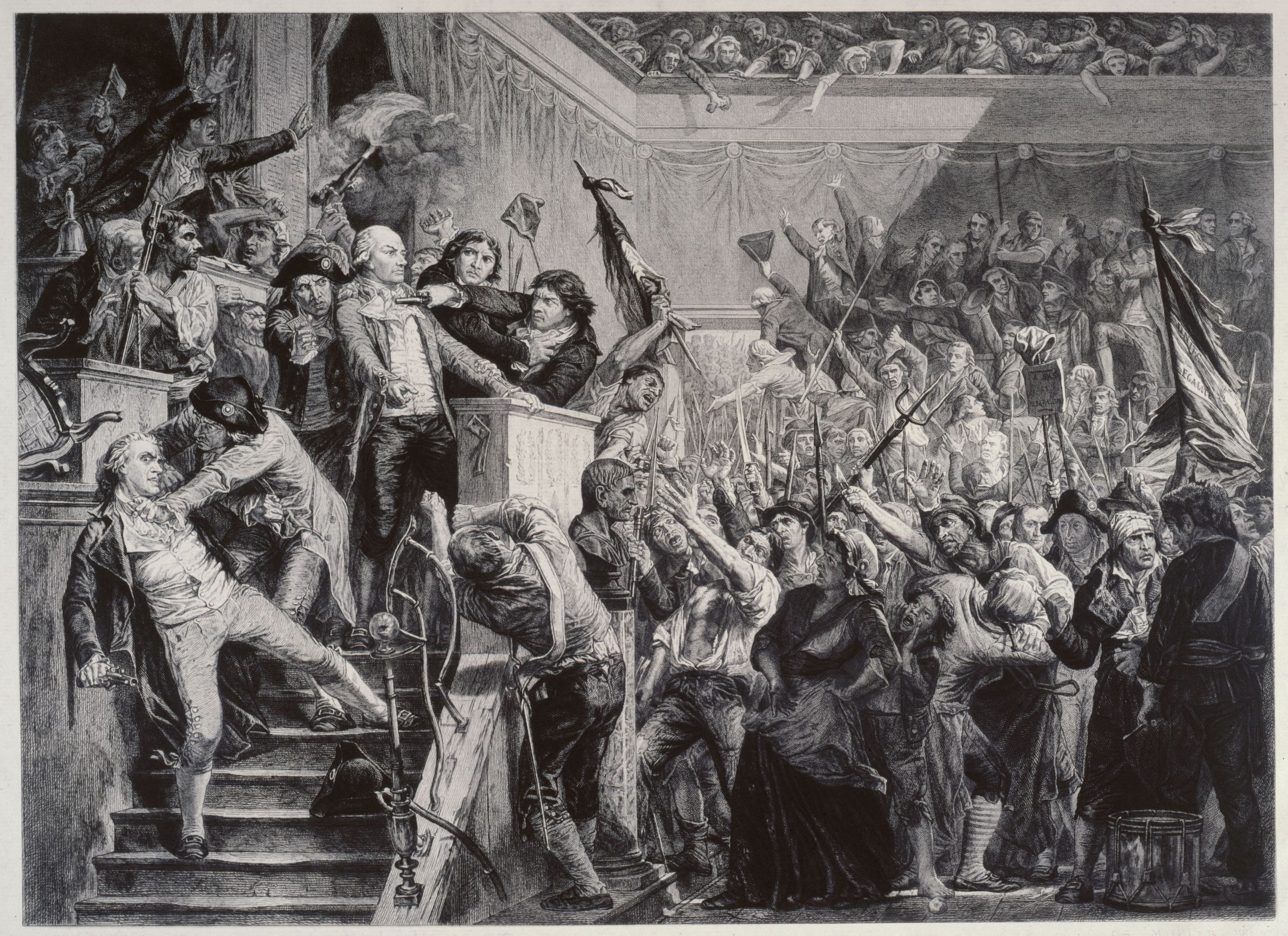
Lanjuinais à la tribune au 2 juin 1793

On Sunday, Hanriot was ordered to march his National Guard from the town hall to the National Palace. The Convention invited Hanriot, who told them all his men were prepared. In the morning, according to historians Mignet and Louis Madelin, a large force of armed citizens (estimated by some as 80–100,000, but by Danton as only 30,000) surrounded the convention with 48 pieces of artillery. "The armed force", Hanriot supposedly said, "will retire only when the Convention has delivered to the people the deputies denounced by the Commune". The Committee of Public Safety did not know how to react. The Girondins believed they were protected by the law, but the people on the galleries called for their arrest. The 300 deputies, confronted on all sides by bayonets and pikes, returned to the meeting hall and submitted to the inevitable. 22 Girondins were seized one by one after some juggling with names. They finally decided that 31 deputies were not to be imprisoned (Note: 19 Girondins, ten members of the Commission of Twelve and two ministers, Lebrun-Tondu and Clavière.) but subjected to house arrest.

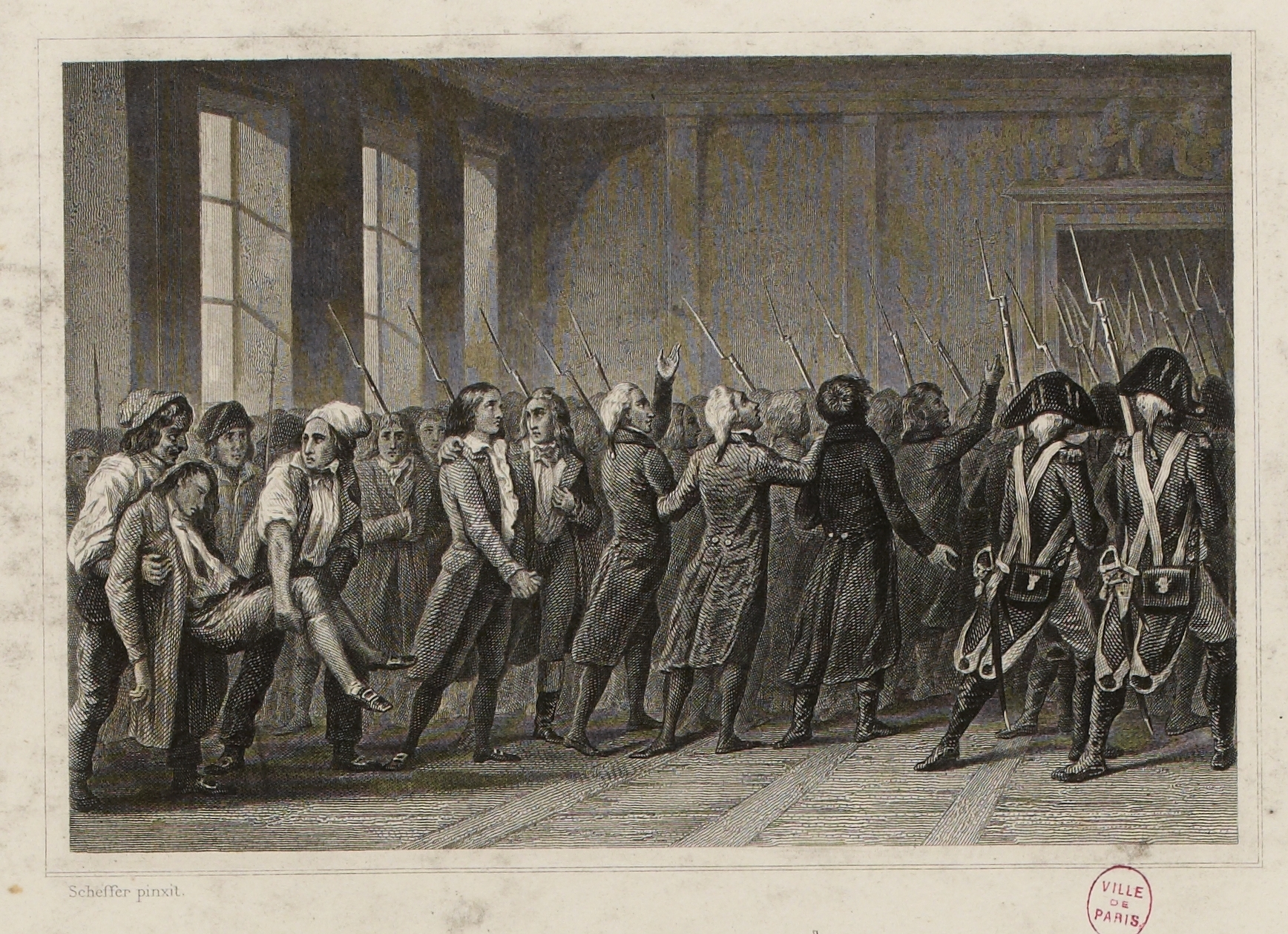
Arrest of the Girondins at the National Convention on 2 June 1793

Jean-Denis Lanjuinais scarcely concluded when the insurgent petitioners came to demand his arrest and that of his colleagues. "Citizens", one supposedly said, "the people are weary of seeing their happiness still postponed; they leave it once more in your hands; save them, or we declare that they will save themselves". The demand again was referred to the Committee of Public Safety.

The petitioners went out shaking their fists at the Convention and shouting, "To arms!" Strict orders were given by Hanriot forbidding the National Guard to let any deputy go in or out. In the name of the Committee of Public Safety, Plains member Bertrand Barère proposed a compromise: the 22 and the 12 would not be arrested but instead be called upon to voluntarily suspend the exercise of their functions. Arrested Girondins Isnard and Claude Fauchet obeyed on the spot. Others refused. While this was going on, Charles-François Delacroix, a deputy of the Mountain, rushed into the convention, hurried to the Tribune, and declared that he had been insulted at the door, that he had been refused egress, and that the convention was no longer free. Many of the Mountain expressed their indignation at Hanriot and his troops. Danton said it was necessary to vigorously avenge this insult to the national honour. Barère proposed that the members of the Convention present themselves to the people. "Representatives", he supposedly said, "vindicate your liberty; suspend your sitting; cause the bayonets that surround you to be lowered".

At the prompting of Barère, the whole Convention, minus the left of the Montagne, started out, led by the president, Hérault de Séchelles, and attempted to exit through the wall of steel with which they were surrounded. On arriving at a door on the Place du Carrousel, they found Hanriot on horseback, saber in hand. "What do the people require?", Hérault de Séchelles supposedly asked, adding, "The convention is wholly engaged in promoting their happiness". "Hérault", Hanriot supposedly replied, "the people have not risen to hear phrases; they require twenty-four traitors to be given up to them". (Note: Mignet quote is a mild version of Hanriot's reply. Historian David Bell in his review "When Terror Was Young" of David Andress' book "The Terror: The Merciless War for Freedom in Revolutionary France" gives a harsher version of the same reply: "Tell your fucking president that he and his Assembly are fucked, and that if within one hour he doesn't deliver to me the Twenty-two I'm going to blast it to the ground". In his view (David Bell's) " such were the words, uttered by the sans-culotte commander Hanriot, cannon literally in hand, by which France's fledgling democracy died" and even the very language underlines it. For François Furet it was "the confrontation between national representation and direct democracy personified in brute force of the poorer classes and their guns".) "Give us all up!", those who surrounded the president supposedly cried. Hanriot then turned to his people and gave the order, "Canonniers, a vos pieces!" ("Cannoneers, to your guns!"). Two pieces were directed upon the convention, who, retiring to the gardens, sought an outlet at various points, but found all the issues guarded.

The deputies walked round the palace, repulsed by bayonets on all sides, only to return and submit. A screaming Marat forced the deputies to go back to the hall. The next day, the interior minister Dominique Joseph Garat forced Danton to disavow the events from the evening before. On the motion of Couthon, the Convention voted for the suspension and house arrest (arrestation chex eux), under the guard of a gendarme, of 29 Girondin members, together with ministers Clavière and Lebrun-Tondu. (Note: 29 Girondins who voted against the execution of Louis XVI were arrested (half of them have articles): Barbaroux, Brissot, Buzot, Gensonné, Gorsas, Guadet, Lanjuinais, Lasource, Lesage, Louvet, Pétion, Vergniaud, Henry-Larivière, Rabaut.)

== Aftermath ==
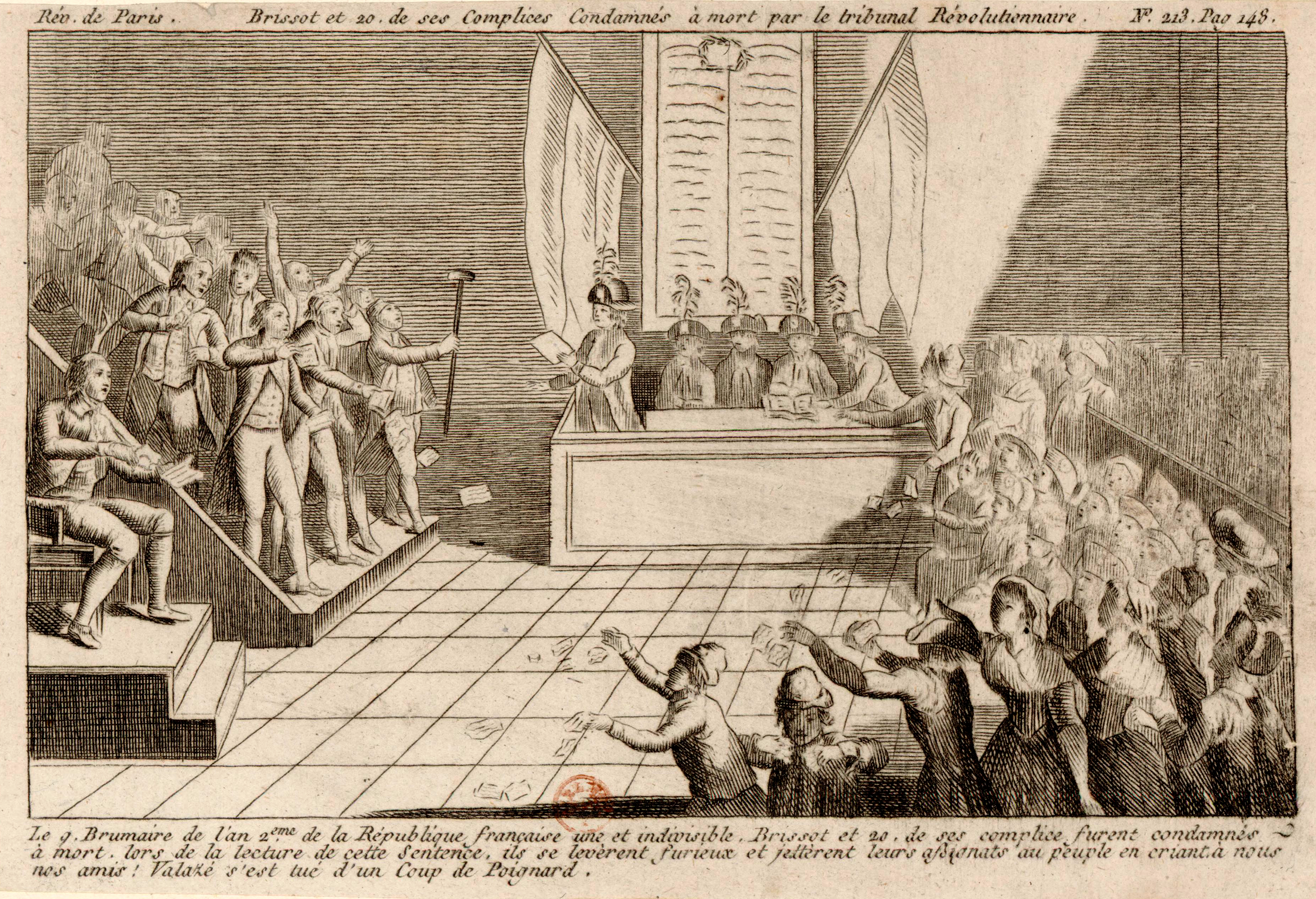
Brissot et 20 de ses complices condamnés à mort par le tribunal révolutionnaire

On 3 June the convention decided to split up the land belonging to Émigrés and sell it to farmers, a maximum on grain prices was introduced, a revolutionary army would be organized, and every citizen would be armed. Robespierre attended a meeting of the Jacobin club to support a decree ending slavery. In the course of summer 1793, governmental power moved into the provisional Committee of Public Safety, and the Jacobin First Republic began its offensive against the enemies of the Revolution.

The trial of the 22 began before the Revolutionary Tribunal on 24 October 1793. The verdict was a foregone conclusion. On 31 October, they were borne to the guillotine. It took 36 minutes to decapitate all of them, including Charles Éléonor Dufriche de Valazé, who had committed suicide the previous day upon hearing the sentence he was given. Most of the 73 deputies who voted against the insurrection were reinstalled on 8 December 1794 and 8 March 1795.

== Sources ==
- Aulard, François-Alphonse (1910). The French Revolution, a Political History, 1789–1804, in 4 vols. Vol. III. New York: Charles Scribner's Sons This article incorporates text from this source, which is in the public domain..
- Bouloiseau, Marc (1983). The Jacobin Republic: 1792–1794. Cambridge: Cambridge University Press. ISBN 0-521-28918-1.
- Furet, François (1996). The French Revolution: 1770–1814. Oxford: Blackwell Publishers Ltd. ISBN 0-631-20299-4.
- Hampson, Norman (1988). A Social History of the French Revolution. Routledge: University of Toronto Press. ISBN 0-710-06525-6.
- Israel, Jonathan (2014). Revolutionary Ideas: An Intellectual History of the French Revolution from The Rights of Man to Robespierre. Princeton University Press. ISBN 978-1-4008-4999-4.
- Mathiez, Albert (1929). The French Revolution. New York: Alfred a Knopf This article incorporates text from this source, which is in the public domain..
- Mignet, François (1824). History of the French Revolution from 1789 to 1814. Project Gutenberg EBook This article incorporates text from this source, which is in the public domain..
- Robespierre, Maximilien de (1958). Bouloiseau, Marc; Lefebvre, Georges; Soboul, Albert; Dautry, Jean (eds.). Oeuvres de Maximilien Robespierre (in French). PUF. OCLC 370022395.
- Schama, Simon (1989). Citizens: A Chronicle of the French Revolution. New York: Alfred A. Knopf. ISBN 978-0-394-55948-3.
- Slavin, Morris (1999). "Robespierre and the Insurrection of 31 May–2 June 1793". In Colin Haydon; William Doyle (eds.). Robespierre. Cambridge: Cambridge University Press.
- Soboul, Albert (1974). The French Revolution:: 1787–1799. New York: Random House. ISBN 0-394-47392-2.
- Thompson, J. M. (1959). The French Revolution. Oxford: Basil Blackwell.
