= Jean-François Varlet =

French revolutionary (1764–1837)

Personal details
- Born: Jean-François Varlet; 14 July 1764 Paris, France
- Died: 4 October 1837 (aged 73) Corbeil-Essonnes, France
- Cause of death: Drowning
- Party: Enragés
- Occupation: Writer, publisher, politician

Jean-François Varlet (French pronunciation: [ʒɑ̃ fʁɑ̃swa vaʁlɛ]; 14 July 1764 – 4 October 1837) was a leader of the Enragés faction during the French Revolution. He was important in the fall of the monarchy and the Insurrection of 31 May – 2 June 1793.

== Life ==
Born in Paris on 14 July 1764 into a family of the petty bourgeoisie, Jean-François Varlet studied at the Collège d'Harcourt. He welcomed the Revolution with enthusiasm and wrote patriotic songs. However, at 21 Varlet was too young to be eligible for an elected position, so he turned to popular agitation instead. He was an early supporter of the radical Jacques Hébert.

Varlet first rose to prominence through his opposition to the monarchy. When Louis XVI attempted to flee Paris, Varlet circulated petitions in the National Assembly and spoke against the king. He helped organize the popular protests that ended in the Champ de Mars massacre.

On 10 August 1792, the Legislative Assembly suspended the king and called for the election of a National Convention to write a new constitution. Varlet was elected, and argued for direct universal suffrage and recall elections. He sought to prevent the wealthy from expanding their profits at the expense of the poor and called for the nationalization of all profits obtained through monopoly and hoarding. Because of these proto-socialist stances, Varlet is considered a member of the Enragés. However, this was not a coherent political party, and another Enragés leader, Jacques Roux, even called for Varlet's arrest. Varlet recognized the importance of women in the revolution, and helped organize poor working women into a semi-cohesive unit.

On 22 February 1793, Jacques Roux and Jean-Francois Varlet emboldened the Parisian working poor to approach the Jacobin Club and persuade them to place price controls on necessary goods. However, the National Convention refused to grant them an audience. Further attempts for the Enragés to communicate their position were denied by the National Convention. Determined to be heard, they responded with revolt. They plundered the homes and businesses of the elite, employing direct action to meet their needs. The Enragés were noted for using legal and extralegal means to achieve their ends. On 24 May 1793 Varlet and other popular leaders were arrested, but this only exacerbated popular discontent. Giving in to the demands of the Commune, the Convention released Varlet and the other radicals three days later. The following day, 28 May, the Cite section called the other sections to a meeting at the Évêché (the Bishop's Palace) in order to organize an insurrection. On the 29th the delegates representing thirty-three of the sections formed an insurrectionary committee of nine, including Varlet. This committee would go on to lead the Insurrection of 31 May – 2 June 1793.

At the beginning of the Reign of Terror, Varlet was again arrested. He was released on 29 October 1793, but after the fall of Robespierre he was arrested yet again and spent almost a year in prison. After his release, Varlet settled at Pailly, Yonne, marrying and having three children. He became a Bonapartist after 1800 and lived some time in Nantes. He returned to Paris for several months in 1830 to participate in the July Revolution. In 1836 he left Nantes to live at Corbeil-Essonnes, where he drowned on 4 October 1837.

== Publications ==
- Aux Mânes de Marat, 1790 - 1830
- Déclaration solennelle des droits de l’homme dans l’état social
- The Explosion, 1794
- Magnanimité de l’Empereur des Français envers ses ennemis, à l’occasion de la nouvelle déclaration des Puissances, 1814
- Le panthéon français, 1795
- Projet d’une caisse patriotique et parisienne, 1789
- Vœux formés par des Français libres, 1785 - 1795
- Vœux formés par des Français libres, 1785 - 1795
- Vœux formés par des Français libres, ou Pétition manifeste d’une partie du souverain à ses délégués pour être signée sur l’autel de la patrie et présenté [sic] le jour où le peuple se lèvera en masse pour résister à l’oppression avec les seules armes de la raison

== Sources ==
- Rose, R. B. (1965). "Jean-François Varlet". Enragés: Socialists of the French Revolution?. Melbourne University Press. pp. 10–35. LCCN 65-24717.
- Soboul, Albert (1974). The French Revolution:: 1787-1799. New York: Random House. ISBN 0-394-47392-2.
- Thompson, J. M. (1959). The French Revolution. Oxford: Basil Blackwell.
