= Red Priest (disambiguation) =

Red Priest is a British baroque instrumental group.

Red Priest may also refer to:

- Red Priests (France), a modern historiographical term for Catholic priests who supported the French Revolution
- The Red Priest, a nickname for the Italian composer Antonio Vivaldi
  - Vivaldi, the Red Priest, a television biography of Vivaldi
- Red priests and priestesses, see List of Game of Thrones characters
