= Louis Félix Roux =

French politician

Louis Félix Roux, (known as ‘Roux de la Haute-Marne’) (25 October 1753, Vichy - 22 September 1817, Huy) was a French politician.

Roux was son of Robert Roux, a schoolmaster, and Marie Petit. Roux learned Latin with the parish priest and then obtained a scholarship to study in a Parisian college. He later took holy orders and in 1786 became parish priest of Vignory. He supported the French Revolution and took the oath for the Civil Constitution of the Clergy, following which in 1791 he was named Episcopal Vicar of the Haute-Marne.

== Early political career ==
In September 1792 Roux was elected from the Haute-Marne to the National Convention, the third out of seven deputies elected, with 188 out of 405 votes. A fervent Montagnard, he was one of the drafters of the Constitution of 1793. At the trial of Louis XVI, he voted against the appeal to the people, for death and against reprieve. During the Insurrection of 31 May – 2 June 1793, he strongly supported the fall of the Girondins.

Roux was Représentant en mission to Oise, Marne and Ardennes, where he zealously applied revolutionary policies. He renounced his clerical orders while on mission and married the daughter of a merchant from Laon in January 1794. In this same city and in Sedan, he then opened temples to Reason. He fell out with his colleague Jean-Baptiste Massieu; despite efforts by Collot d’Herbois to reconcile them, Massieu accused him of arbitrary measures. The Jacobin club considered this accusation and dismissed it.

== Later political career ==
In 1794 Roux supported the Thermidorian reaction against Robespierre. In 1795 during the insurrections of Germinal and Prairial he supported state repression and took his revenge on Massieu by bringing accusations against him. On April 4, 1795 he was elected to the Committee of Public Safety and remained there for three months, in charge of trade and subsistence.

After the royalist insurrection of 13 Vendémiaire, he was elected to the short-lived Commission of Five, charged with bringing forward measures of public safety against the royalists. On October 15, 1795 Roux was elected to the Council of Five Hundred by the Ardennes and Nord. He sat for the duration of the Directory and was a loyal supporter of the regime. Apart from his elected positions, in 1799 he worked at the Ministry of the Interior under Nicolas Marie Quinette and after 18th Brumaire he joined the Commission on Émigrés. From 1800 to 1802 Joseph Fouché employed him as director of the archives of the Ministry of Police. Unemployed after Fouché's resignation, in 1804 he became a tax collector in Dinant in the department of Sambre-et-Meuse.

His political career was briefly revived in 1815, during the Hundred Days, when he was appointed subprefect of Laon, but the Bourbon restoration saw him banished from France as a regicide in January 1816. In March he left France and settled in Huy, in present day Belgium. He died a year later at the age of 64.
