= Enragés =

Political faction during the French revolution

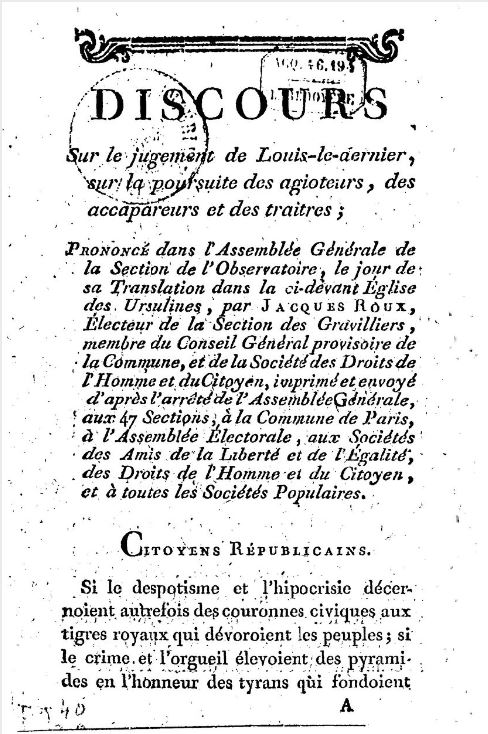
Roux-programme 1792

The Enragés (French: [ɑ̃ʁɑʒe]; transl. "enraged ones") were radical revolutionaries associated with the Parisian sans-culottes during the French Revolution. They advocated greater social and political equality, measures against rising food prices, and severe punishment of hoarders and speculators. Among the figures commonly associated with the Enragés were Jacques Roux, Jean-François Varlet, Théophile Leclerc, Claire Lacombe and Pauline Léon.

The Enragés were not a unified political party and had no common leadership or jointly agreed programme. Although they shared certain political and economic demands, they pursued different objectives and rarely acted together. The Jacobins contributed to the perception of the Enragés as a cohesive group by treating their radical opponents as a single faction. Although the term enragé was already used during the Revolution, nineteenth-century historians—including Adolphe Thiers, as well as Philippe Buchez and Pierre Roux — further reinforced the portrayal of Roux, Varlet and Leclerc as a distinct political group acting collectively.

== Primary demands ==
On 25 June 1793, Jacques Roux delivered an address to the National Convention that later became known as the Manifesto of the Enragés. Although associated with the Enragés, it did not represent a jointly agreed programme. Roux argued that freedom and equality were meaningless as long as the wealthy profited from shortages while the poor struggled to afford basic necessities. To combat this, he demanded the death penalty for hoarders and speculators, the requisition of essential commodities, and strict price controls on everyday goods. His economic program also featured heavily punitive measures against wealth, advocating for heavy taxation and forced loans levied directly on the rich to fund the war effort. Furthermore, his demands extended to radical political and military measures, such as expelling nobles from military commands and taking the families of émigrés hostage. Additionally, he accused bankers of undermining the value of the assignat and warned that the government's failure to act threatened the Republic's finances.

== Emergence ==
The radical faction emerged in Paris between 1792 and 1793, driven by worsening economic hardship and political unrest. Rather than operating as an organized party, individual agitators like Jacques Roux, Jean-François Varlet, and Théophile Leclerc independently mobilized the sans-culottes around shared demands for price controls and severe penalties for hoarding and speculation. They primarily found their political home and audience within the Cordeliers Club, using it as a central base to coordinate popular agitation and build an influential following among the Parisian working class.

On 1 December 1792, Jacques Roux delivered a speech before the Section de l'Observatoire, calling for the punishment of Louis XVI, hoarders, speculators and traitors. The section voted to print and distribute his speech to the other 47 Parisian sections, the electoral assembly and patriotic societies, and ordered it to be read aloud twice weekly for a month.

The economic crisis of early 1793 intensified popular discontent. On 22 February, women seeking a venue to discuss food shortages were turned away by the Jacobin Club. On 23 February, Roux, acting as an officer of the Paris Commune, presented a proclamation intended to reassure the population about food supplies. The following day, two delegations—including one of Parisian laundresses —appeared before the National Convention to protest rising prices, particularly of sugar, candles, and soap. When the Assembly postponed the issue until Tuesday, the women reportedly declared that they would "adjourn themselves until Monday."

Consequently, on 25–26 February, crowds dominated by women systematically targeted grocery stores, forcing shopkeepers to sell commodities like soap and sugar at drastically reduced, popular price caps. While the Paris Commune moved cautiously to restore order, Roux openly defended the crowds before the municipal council, arguing that shopkeepers were merely restitutioning wealth stolen through usurious prices. Although these disturbances were heavily associated with Roux, historians have disputed his responsibility for organizing them.

== Associated figures ==
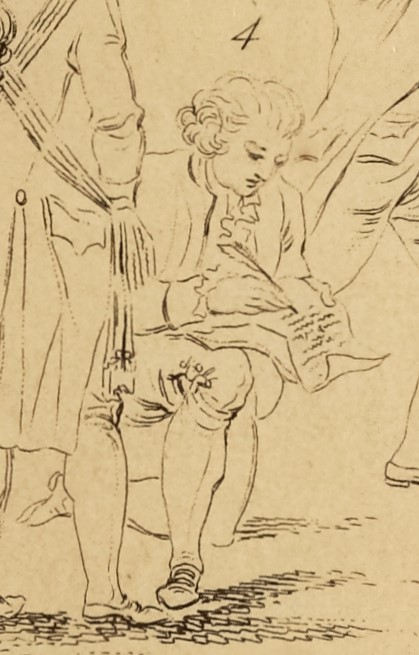
Jacques Roux depicted recording the proceedings at the execution of Louis XVI. Detail of an illustration after Charles Benazech, engraved by Jean-Frédéric Cazenave and published in London in 1796. Musée Carnavalet, Paris.

=== Jacques Roux ===
Jacques Roux, a constitutional priest, was one of the leading figures associated with the Enragés. On 16 January 1791, he took the oath required under the Civil Constitution of the Clergy, declaring his willingness to shed his blood for a revolution that recognized equality before God. He became deeply influential among the sans-culottes of the Section des Gravilliers, where he championed affordable bread and strict penalties for speculators. On 21 January 1793, as a commissioner of the Paris Commune, Roux accompanied Louis XVI to his execution; he notoriously refused to accept the condemned king's last testament, sharply stating that his only mission was to lead him to the scaffold.

Following the political fallout of his June manifesto, Roux's populist standing was severely damaged by Jean-Paul Marat himself. Shortly before his assassination in July 1793, Marat published a fierce denunciation in his journal, branding Roux a "false prophet" who was actively misleading the people. This attack broke Roux's populist legitimacy and paved the way for Robespierre and the Jacobins to escalate their political pressure, resulting in Roux's subsequent arrest. He managed to continue editing his newspaper from his cell until January 1794, when his case was referred to the Revolutionary Tribunal. To escape the inevitability of the guillotine, Roux committed suicide in prison shortly after. The figures associated with the Enragés were never tried or executed as a group.

=== Jean Varlet ===
Jean Varlet emerged as a passionate advocate for direct democracy, making it the cornerstone of his revolutionary activism following Louis XVI's attempted flight in June 1791. Active in the popular agitation leading to the Insurrection of 10 August 1792, he was elected to the Paris electoral assembly but failed to secure a seat in the National Convention. Operating outside the legislature, Varlet formulated his theory of the imperative mandate, arguing that elected officials were not sovereign representatives but mere proxies bound by strict instructions from primary assemblies and subject to immediate recall. He also fiercely attacked speculation, hoarding, and monopolies, proposing that wealth amassed through such abuses be confiscated by the nation. While later historians grouped Varlet with Roux and Leclerc, the three pursued their activities independently, leaving little evidence of sustained cooperation.

=== Théophile Leclerc ===
Théophile Leclerc began his revolutionary career in the military, joining the first battalion of volunteers from Morbihan after returning from Martinique in 1791. Following his discharge in early 1792, he moved to Paris, where his fiery speeches at the Jacobin Club quickly gained him notoriety. He spent part of 1793 organizing with the Central Club in Lyon, but returned to the capital in May to support the Insurrection of 31 May – 2 June 1793, aggressively demanding harsher measures against the Girondins. Following the assassination of Marat, Leclerc sought to inherit the martyr's mantle by publishing his own radical newspaper, L'Ami du peuple, from July to September 1793. However, his attempt to continue the publication faced fierce resistance from Marat's companion, Simonne Évrard, who denounced Leclerc before the National Convention for exploiting Marat's name to deceive the public, which ultimately contributed to the journal's suppression. His personal and political life converged in November of that year when he married Pauline Léon, a fellow radical activist.

=== Claire Lacombe and Pauline Léon ===
In May 1793, the actress Claire Lacombe and the chocolate maker Pauline Léon founded the Society of Revolutionary Republican Women. Léon was already a veteran of the popular movement, having participated in the storming of the Bastille and famously petitioned the Legislative Assembly for women's right to bear arms to defend the capital. Together, she and Lacombe organized their society to advocate for greater political participation by women, while simultaneously demanding strict measures against rising food prices and shortages. The society closely supported the popular movement against the Girondins and subsequently became associated with the Enragés. On 30 October 1793, the National Convention banned all women's political clubs, bringing the society's activities to a sudden end.

== Legacy ==
The suppression of the Enragés in late 1793 marked the beginning of their political marginalization. Their swift downfall was engineered by rival radical revolutionaries, including Maximilien Robespierre and Jacques Hébert, who united on 30 June 1793 to expel Roux and Leclerc from the Cordeliers Club, appeared before the National Convention to denounce Roux and Leclerc for exploiting Marat's memory to advance their own radical agenda, effectively stripping them of their populist legitimacy.

Despite their contemporary defeat, the Enragés were later re-evaluated as foundational figures of early socialist thought. In The Holy Family (1845), Karl Marx and Friedrich Engels placed Roux and Leclerc within a revolutionary lineage that led through Gracchus Babeuf and Philippe Buonarroti to the birth of modern communism. Marx and Engels admired them so extensively that they planned an unrealized multi-volume library of foreign socialist authors, which was to feature selected writings by Leclerc. Modern historiography remains divided on this continuity; Robert Barrie Rose argued that treating the Enragés as early socialists overstates their ideological cohesion, noting a lack of evidence connecting Roux or Leclerc directly to Babeuf's subsequent conspiracies.

The memory of the group resurfaced during the political upheaval of May 1968. A faction of radical students at Nanterre University, led by figures such as fr:René Riesel consciously adopted the moniker Enragés to evoke the uncompromising spirit of their 1793 predecessors. Closely aligned with the Situationist International, this modern incarnation played a critical role in the occupations movement and the escalation of the nationwide protests.
