= Pierre Henry-Larivière =

French politician

- Born: Pierre François Joachim Henry Larivière; 6 December 1761; Falaise
- Died: 2 November 1838 (aged 76); Paris
- Known for: politician

Pierre François Joachim Henry Larivière or La Rivière, known as Henry-Larivière, (b. Falaise, 6 December 1761, d. Paris 3 November 1838), was a French politician and député for Calvados to the Convention.

== Revolution and Convention ==
A lawyer in Falaise, he espoused the ideas of the Jacobins. Elected to the National Assembly by the département of Calvados, he was noted for his hostile attitude towards the court and the king’s ministers. He favoured war, was hostile to refractory clergy and émigrés as well as to the monarchy after the demonstration of 20 June 1792.

Re-elected as a député of Calvados to the Convention nationale, he took his seat with the Girondins, becoming an increasingly vocal critic of The Mountain. He became a member of the Legislative Committee, and began to adopt a more conciliatory position towards the monarchy. During the trial of Louis XVI, he recused himself on the vote on the king’s guilt, because

“having taken part in the drafting of the decree that brought him to trial, but then having opposed the amendment to that decree which brought him to trial before the Convention, I am not obliged to give a view on the outcome; it is repugnant to my conscience to be at one and the same time a legislator and a jury member on a matter which, I furthermore insist, should be ultimately decided by the sovereign people.”

He voted for the sentence against the king to be ratified by the people; on the matter of sentence, he voted for imprisonment during the war and exile thereafter; he also voted for the sentence to be reprieved.

On 12 April 1793, he voted for the arraignment of Jean-Paul Marat. On 21 May 1793 he was elected to the Commission of Twelve to investigate conspiracies against the Convention. However when The Mountain refused to hear him speak on 27 May, he resigned.

During the insurrection of 31 May – 2 June his name was included on the list of Girondins to be arrested. Placed under house arrest, he managed to escape, and reached Caen, where he managed to hide. He tried, unsuccessfully, to foment revolt in the provinces against Paris. Declared a traitor on 28 July 1793, he managed to remain in hiding until after the Thermidorian Reaction.

He rejoined the Convention on 18 Ventôse Year III (8 March 1795), where, after the revolt of 1 Prairial Year III, he demanded the arrest of the Montagnards. As a member of the Committee of Public Safety from 15 Prairial (3 June) to 15 Vendémiaire (7 October), he demanded the arrest of all the members of all the old committees, particularly Robert Lindet and Lazare Carnot.

== Directory ==
Elected to the Council of Five Hundred by no fewer than thirty-seven départements, he chose to take his seat for Calvados and became one of the leading lights of the Club de Clichy, a royalist club under the Directory. President of the Council (19 June - 18 July) after the royalist victory in the 1797 elections, his name was included in a list of those to be deported to Guiana after the anti-royalist coup of 18 Fructidor on 4 September, and he was obliged to flee the country. He managed to reach Switzerland first, and then England, where he joined the entourage of the comte d'Artois (later Charles X de France).

== After the Revolution ==
Returning to France after the First Restoration, he became Advocate General at the Court of Cassation, went back into exile during the Hundred Days and came back again after the Second Restoration. Refusing the recognise the July Monarchy, he left France for Florence, only returning in 1837.
