= Claude Fauchet (revolutionist) =

French constitutional bishop (1744–1793)

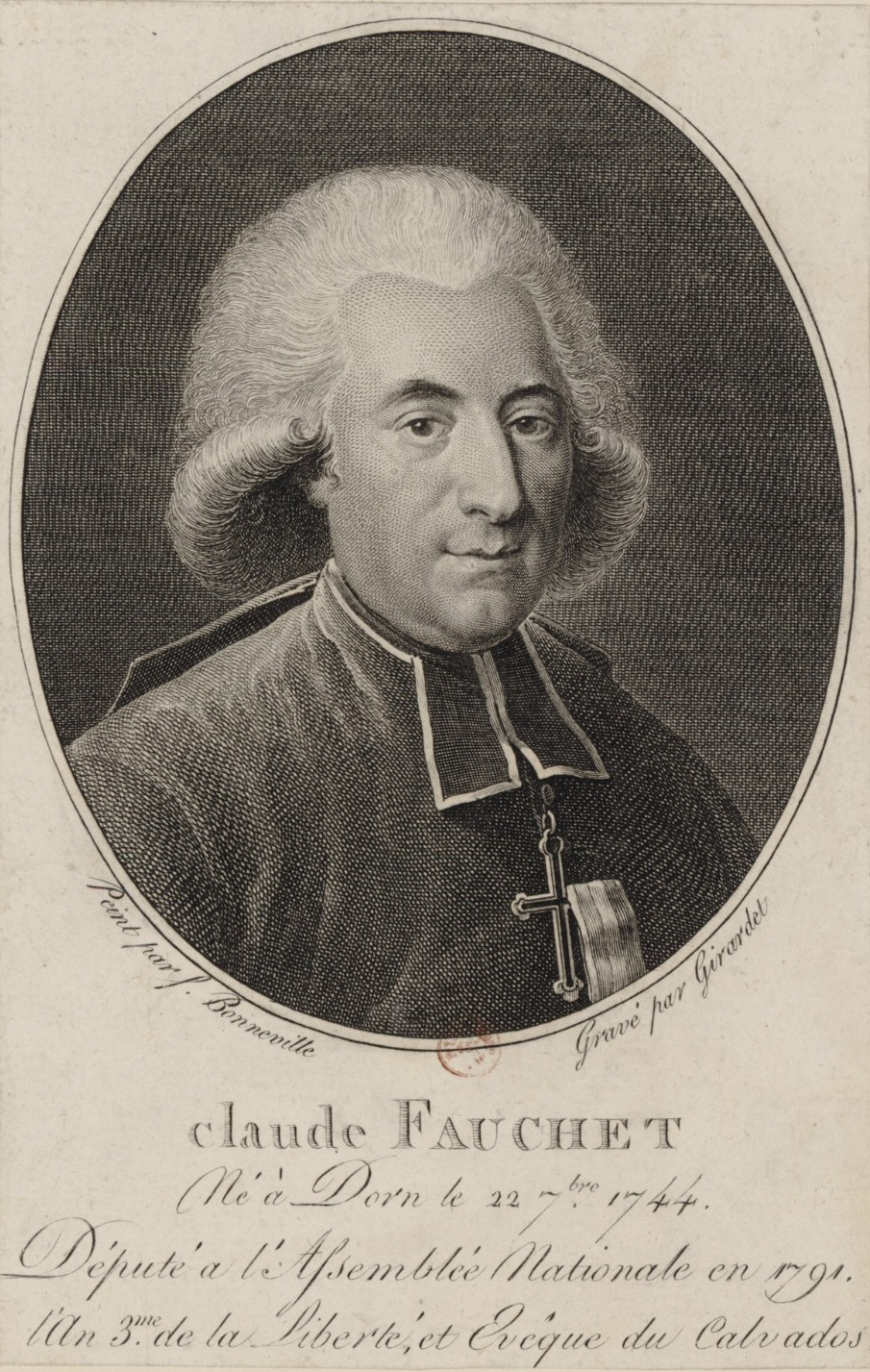
- Born: Claude François Fauchet; 3 January 1742; Dornes, Nièvre, France
- Died: 31 October 1793 (aged 51); Paris, France
- Cause of death: Execution by guillotine
- Known for: French constitutional bishop

Claude François Fauchet (French pronunciation: [klod foʃɛ]; 22 September 1744 – 31 October 1793) was a French radical Red Priest and a constitutional bishop.

== Biography ==
He was born at Dornes, Nièvre. He was a curate of the church of St Roch, Paris, when he was engaged as tutor to the children of the marquis of Choiseul, brother of Louis XV's minister, an appointment which proved to be the first step to fortune. He was successively grand vicar to the archbishop of Bourges, preacher to the king, and abbot of Montfort-Lacarre.

The philosophic tone of his sermons caused his dismissal from court in 1788 before he became a popular speaker in the Parisian sections. He was one of the leaders of the attack on the Bastille, and on 5 August 1789 he delivered an eloquent discourse by way of funeral sermon for the citizens slain on 14 July, taking as his text the words of St Paul, "Ye have been called to liberty".

He blessed the tricolour flag for the National Guard, and in September was elected to the Commune, from which he retired in October 1790. During the next winter he organized within the Palais Royal the Social Club of the Society of the Friends of Truth, presiding overcrowded meetings under the self-assumed title of procureur general de la vérité. Nevertheless, events were marching faster than his opinions, and the last occasion on which he carried his public with him was in a sermon preached at Notre Dame on 4 February 1791.

In May he became constitutional bishop of Calvados, and was presently returned by the department to the Legislative Assembly, and afterwards to the Convention. At the king's trial he voted for the appeal to the people and for the penalty of imprisonment. He protested against the execution of Louis XVI in the Journal des amis (26 January 1793), and next month was denounced to the convention for prohibiting married priests from the exercise of the priesthood in his diocese. He remained secretary to the convention until, the accusation of the Girondists in May 1793.

In July he was imprisoned on the charge of supporting the federalist movement at Caen, and of complicity with Charlotte Corday, whom he had taken to see a sitting of the convention on her arrival in Paris. Of the second of these charges he was certainly innocent. With the Girondist deputies he was brought before the revolutionary tribunal on 30 October, and was guillotined on the following day.

== Sources ==
- This further cites:
  - Mémoires . . . ou Lettres de Claude Fauchet (5th ed., 79,3)
  - Notes sur Claude Fauchet (Caen, 1842)
