= Montagnard =

Montagnard (of the mountain or mountain dweller) may refer to:

- Montagnard (French Revolution), members of The Mountain (La Montagne), a political group during the French Revolution (1790s)
  - Montagnard (1848 revolution), members of the political group The Mountain (La Montagne) of the Second French Republic (1848)
- Montagnard (Vietnam), a member of the indigenous peoples of the Central Highlands of Vietnam
- Montagnard (Cambodia), name given by the French colonial administration to the Khmer Loeu, highland tribes in Cambodia
