= Revolutionary sections of Paris =

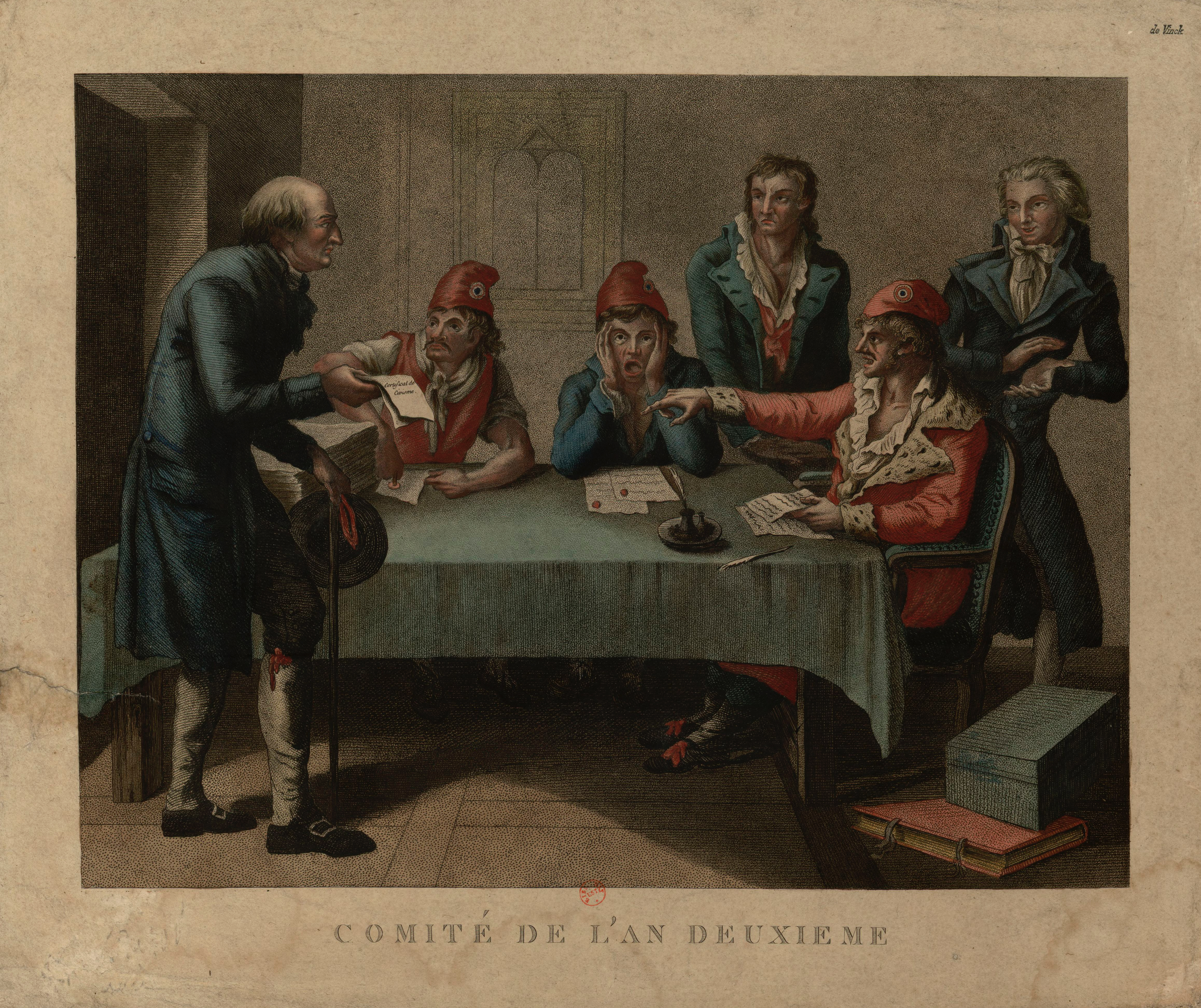
A revolutionary surveillance committee in 1793

The revolutionary sections of Paris were the 48 subdivisions of Paris established in 1790 during the French Revolution. Their assemblies, originally convened for elections, became centres of neighbourhood politics and popular mobilisation. The sections helped form the Insurrectionary Commune during the uprising of 10 August 1792, and the battalions of the Paris National Guard were reorganised along section boundaries. The municipal reforms of 1795 grouped the former sections into twelve arrondissements, where they survived as territorial subdivisions called divisions.

== History ==
=== From districts to sections ===
In April 1789, Paris was divided into 60 electoral districts to choose representatives of the Third Estate to the Estates-General. The district assemblies continued to meet after the elections. On 21 May 1790, the National Constituent Assembly authorised commissioners to draw the boundaries of 48 sections to replace the 21 districts. The Assembly approved the plan on 22 June, and Louis XVI issued letters patent for the new municipal organisation on 27 June.

Each section had a primary assembly in which active citizens could vote. It also elected sixteen commissioners who formed a civil committee. Their duties included overseeing and assisting the local police commissioner, seeing that municipal decisions were carried out, and reporting to the municipal authorities.

=== The insurrection of August 1792 ===
A law of 25 July 1792 allowed the section assemblies to remain in continuous session. In the weeks before the insurrection of 10 August, several sections admitted passive citizens, who lacked voting rights under the constitution, to their deliberations.

On 3 August, the mayor of Paris, Jérôme Pétion, presented a petition from the sections to the Legislative Assembly, calling for the deposition of Louis XVI. On 4 August, the Legislative Assembly annulled a resolution by the Mauconseil section declaring that it no longer recognised Louis XVI as king. That evening, the Quinze-Vingts section agreed to postpone the planned uprising at Pétion’s request, giving the Assembly until 11 p.m. on 9 August to respond to the demand for the king’s deposition. On 5 August, Mauconseil and the sections that supported it submitted a new petition restating the annulled resolution. The next day, a delegation from the section de la Bibliothèque publicly repudiated the petition and disputed the authority of the commissioners who had acted in its name.

During the night of 9–10 August, commissioners from the sections formed the Insurrectionary Commune at the Hôtel de Ville. Parisian insurgents and fédérés from the provinces stormed the Tuileries Palace on 10 August. The Legislative Assembly suspended the king and called for the election of a National Convention. From 13 August, commissioners from the sections reorganised the battalions of the Paris National Guard to bring their boundaries back into line with those of the sections.

=== The September Massacres ===
Map of Paris and its 48 sections, published by Esnauts and Rapilly in 1793

After the insurrection of 10 August 1792, Paris sections formed local surveillance committees. The section des Postes decided to establish one on 19 August. On 28 August, the Paris Commune ordered all sections to arrest suspected opponents of the Revolution within 48 hours. House searches followed on the night of 29–30 August.

On 2 September, the first day of the September Massacres, the Poissonnière section called for prisoners it described as conspirators to be put to death before volunteers left for the frontier. The Louvre section endorsed the resolution. That same day, the section des Postes sent three delegations to the Abbaye prison. The third secured the release of two prisoners, Chignard and Laurent.

=== The sections under the National Convention ===
On 21 March 1793, the Convention ordered each commune, or each section in towns divided into sections, to elect a twelve-member surveillance committee. Its initial duties concerned the registration and surveillance of foreigners.

On 28 March 1793, a delegation from the Paris sections called for the creation of a revolutionary army to counter the threat of counter-revolution. On 15 April, the mayor of Paris, Jean-Nicolas Pache, led a delegation to the National Convention with a petition calling for the removal of 22 Girondin deputies. Pache told the Convention that 35 of the 48 sections had endorsed the petition.

The sections helped organise the insurrection of 31 May – 2 June 1793, which forced the Convention to order the arrest of leading Girondin deputies. On 5 September, the Convention limited section assemblies to two meetings a week and provided for an allowance for poorer citizens who attended.

On 5 September 1793, commissioners from the Paris sections joined a Jacobin deputation to the National Convention, which voted that day to establish a Revolutionary Army in Paris. On 9 September, the Convention directed the sections' revolutionary committees to put forward recruits and assigned half of the Paris National Guard's artillery companies to the army. The other half remained on duty in their sections. The Law of Suspects of 17 September directed these committees to draw up lists of suspects and issue arrest warrants.

On 27 July 1794 (9 Thermidor Year II), during the fall of Robespierre, the Commune called all 48 sections into session. The Convention sent the sections a decree forbidding them to obey the Commune. On 24 August, the Convention reorganised the surveillance committees into twelve jurisdictions, each covering four sections.

=== Municipal reorganisation ===
Several sections took part in the royalist uprising against the Convention on 5 October 1795 (13 Vendémiaire Year IV).

On 11 October 1795 (19 Vendémiaire Year IV), the National Convention passed a law organising Paris into twelve district municipalities, each comprising four former sections. The law abolished the civil committees. The former sections were retained as territorial subdivisions known as divisions.

== List of sections ==
The sections are listed in the order of the 1790 plan, with selected later names in parentheses.

1. Tuileries
2. Champs-Élysées
3. Roule (République)
4. Palais-Royal (Palais-Égalité, Butte-des-Moulins, Montagne)
5. Place Vendôme (Piques)
6. Bibliothèque (Quatre-Vingt-Douze, Lepeletier)
7. Grange-Batelière (Mirabeau, Mont-Blanc)
8. Louvre (Muséum)
9. Oratoire (Gardes-Françaises)
10. Halle-aux-Blés
11. Postes (Contrat-Social)
12. Place Louis XIV (Mail, Guillaume-Tell)
13. Fontaine-Montmorency (Molière et Lafontaine, Brutus)
14. Bonne-Nouvelle
15. Ponceau (Amis-de-la-Patrie)
16. Mauconseil (Bon-Conseil)
17. Marché-des-Innocents (Halles, Marchés)
18. Lombards
19. Arcis
20. Faubourg-Montmartre
21. Rue Poissonnière
22. Bondy
23. Temple
24. Popincourt
25. Rue de Montreuil
26. Quinze-Vingts
27. Gravilliers
28. Faubourg-Saint-Denis (Faubourg-du-Nord)
29. Beaubourg (Réunion)
30. Enfants-Rouges (Marais, Homme-Armé)
31. Roi-de-Sicile (Droits-de-l'Homme)
32. Hôtel-de-Ville (Maison-Commune, Fidélité)
33. Place-Royale (Fédérés, Indivisibilité)
34. Arsenal
35. Île-Saint-Louis (Fraternité)
36. Notre-Dame (Cité)
37. Henri IV (Pont-Neuf, Révolutionnaire)
38. Invalides
39. Fontaine-de-Grenelle
40. Quatre-Nations (Unité)
41. Théâtre-Français (Marseille, Marseille et Marat, Marat)
42. Croix-Rouge (Bonnet-Rouge, Ouest)
43. Luxembourg (Mutius-Scaevola)
44. Thermes-de-Julien (Beaurepaire, Chalier)
45. Sainte-Geneviève (Panthéon-Français)
46. Observatoire
47. Jardin-des-Plantes (Sans-Culottes)
48. Gobelins (Finistère)
