= Morris Slavin =

American historian

Morris Slavin (1913–2006) was a scholar of the French Revolution, a Marxist historian, and an early American Trotskyist activist between the 1930s and 1950s. Slavin was born in Kiev but lived primarily in Youngstown, Ohio. Slavin taught for many years at Youngstown State University and his books made a significant contribution to the understanding of the French Revolution in the "history from below" style established by Albert Soboul.

== Books ==
- The French Revolution in Miniature: Section Droits-de-L'Homme, 1789-1795, Princeton, 1984.
- The Making of an Insurrection: Parisian Sections and the Gironde, Harvard, 1986.
- The Hébertistes to the Guillotine: Anatomy of a "Conspiracy" in Revolutionary France, Louisiana State, 1994.
- The Left and the French Revolution, Humanities, 1995.

=== Collections ===
- Bourgeois, Sans-Culottes, and Other Frenchmen, ed. with Agnes M. Smith, Wilfrid Laurier University, 1981.
- Reflections at the End of a Century, ed. with Louis Pastouras, Youngstown State, 2002.

=== Essays ===
- "The Heroic Individual and His Milieu," in Debating Marx, ed. Louis Pastouras, EmText, 1994.
- "Robespierre and the Insurrection of 31 May - 2 June 1793," in Robespierre, ed. Colin Haydon and William Doyle, Cambridge University Press, 1999.

=== Publications Available Online ===
- Review of book on Annales School, 1991
- "Review-essay on studies of Lenin and Bolshevism, 1996". Vol. 48, no. 7. Archived from the original on March 11, 2007 – via FindArticles.
- "Review of Russian Trotskyist memoir, 1997". Vol. 49, no. 7. Archived from the original on March 11, 2007 – via FindArticles.
- "Review of book on French Revolution in Russian intellectual life, 1997". Vol. 49, no. 8. Archived from the original on November 5, 2007 – via FindArticles.
