= Jean-Baptiste Massieu =

French politician

Jean-Baptiste Massieu (17 September 1743 Pontoise - 8 June 1818 Brussels) was a French bishop, politically active during the French Revolution.

The son of a Norman hosier, he took holy orders in Rouen, took up his first post as a teacher of rhetoric at Vernon and in 1768 moved to the royal college in Nancy. He may also have been a tutor to the younger Lameth brothers, and in 1782 was appointed curate of Cergy.

When the Estates General were summoned, he was elected to sit for the First Estate representing Senlis. In December 1789 he became secretary of the new National Assembly and joined the ecclesiastical committee, and in December 1790 he took the oath to the Civil Constitution of the Clergy. He was elected constitutional bishop of Oise on 21 February 1791.

On 4 September 1792 he was elected to represent Oise in the National Convention, receiving 315 out of 627 votes. During the trial of Louis XVI he voted against appeal to the people, for the death penalty and against reprieve. In 1793 he was sent as a representant en mission first to Ardennes and then to Marne. He renounced his religious vows while he was away from Paris, and shortly afterward married the daughter-in-law of the mayor of Givet, Marie-Odile Briquelet. His main task in the North was to deal with traitors and counter-revolutionaries, and he also erected a temple to Reason in Sedan.

In April 1794 he returned to the Convention, joined the public education committee, and worked on new primary school textbooks. Like many representants en mission who had made themselves unpopular outside Paris, he was denounced after the Thermidorean reaction and arrested on 9 August 1795, at the same time as Joseph Fouché. However thanks to an amnesty decree he was freed again 4 Brumaire Year IV (26 October 1795). He was employed for some months as a geographer by the War Ministry and then took up a post as a school teacher in Versailles. In 1797 he was given a new post as archivist at the War Ministry, which he occupied until 1815, building, cataloguing and storing its collections. His work in the archive yielded more than 800 volumes of collected papers and 8,000 books added to the collection.

Proscribed as a regicide in 1815, he went into exile in Brussels, leaving his wife behind in Paris. Despite his petitions and the support of the duc de Richelieu, he was never given permission to return to France. He fell ill in 1818 and his wife obtained a passport to join him; he died in poverty on 6 June 1818.
