= Timeline of the French Revolution =

French Revolution
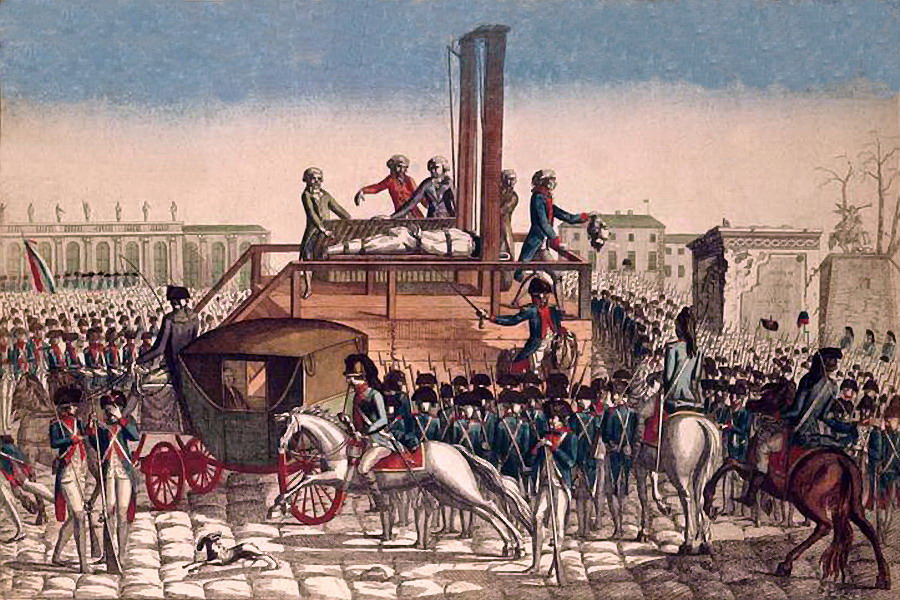
- The execution of Louis XVI on the Place de la Révolution (now Place de la Concorde) (January 21, 1793)
- Date: 1789–1799
- Location: France
- Participants: French society
- Outcome: Abolition of the French monarchy; Establishment of a secular and democratic republic that became increasingly authoritarian and militaristic; Radical social change based on liberalism and other Enlightenment principles; Rise of Napoleon Bonaparte; Armed conflicts with other European countries

The following is a timeline of the French Revolution.

== Pre-1788 – The pre-revolution; challenging absolutism ==
- 19 January 1771: Beginning of the "Maupeou Coup" against the parlements, one of the few checks on the authority of the crown. Seeking popularity, Louis XVI reinstated the parlements soon after his coronation.
- May 3, 1775: The king's safety is threatened during the "Flour War," a wave of peasant riots that presage revolts during the revolution. (Popkin 65)
- 1776: Charles Vergennes convinces the king to provide financial support to the rebels in the American War of Independence, greatly increasing the nation's debt. (Popkin 69)
- May 8, 1776: The king is forced to resort to a lit de justice to compel the Paris Parlement to accept reforms proposed by Turgot. (Popkin 68)
- February 1781: Jacques Necker publishes the Compte rendu, a report of state accounts that obfuscates the nation's financial problems. (Popkin 72)
- August 1786: Finance Minister Calonne warns the king of imminent bankruptcy. (Popkin 75)
- 26 September 1786: The Eden Agreement is signed between the kingdoms of Great Britain and France.
- February - May 1787: The king convenes the Assembly of Notables, which refuses to support the crown's efforts to raise more funds. (Popkin 78–88)

== 1788 – The royal treasury is empty; prelude to revolution ==
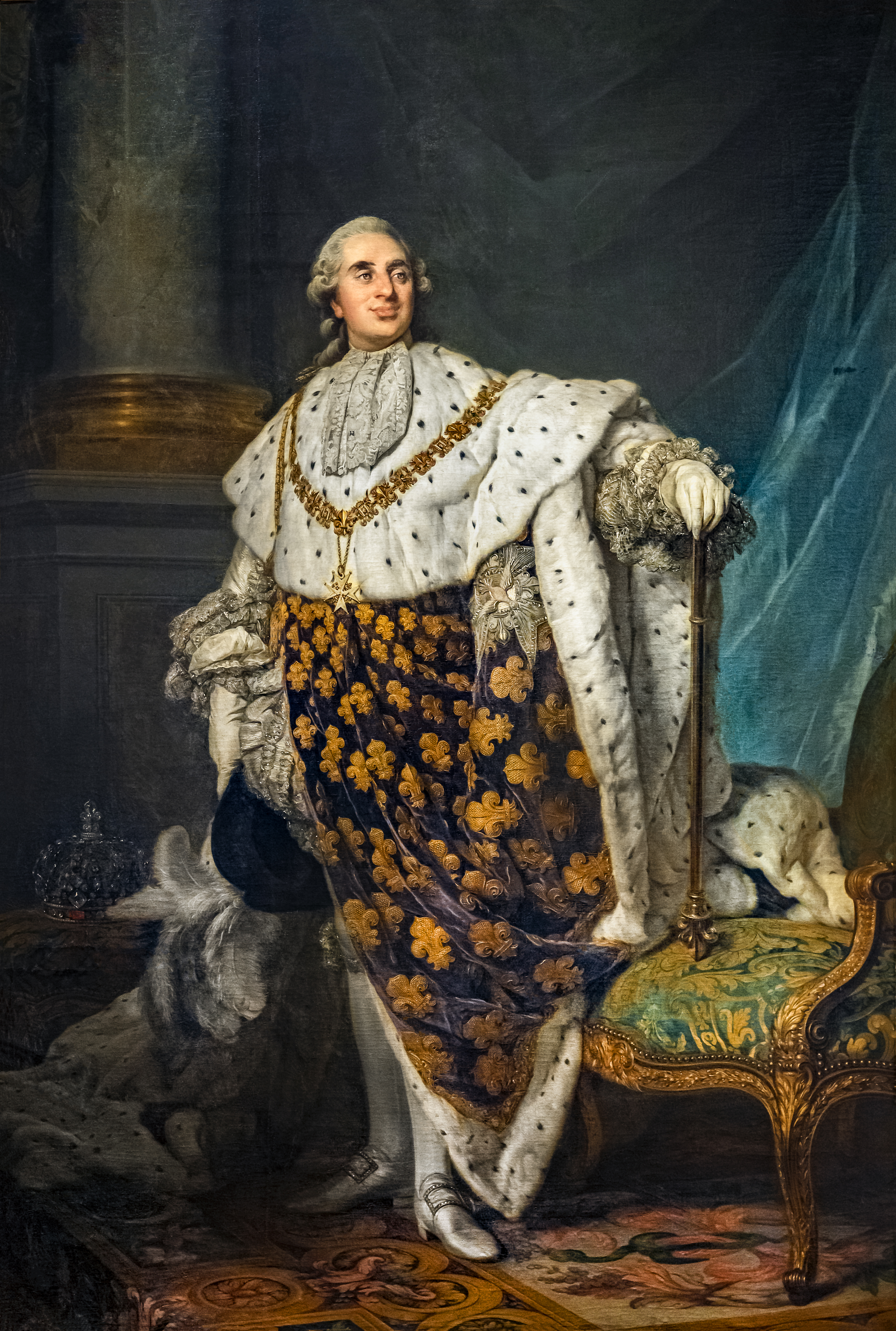
Portrait of Louis XVI by Joseph Duplessis, 1776

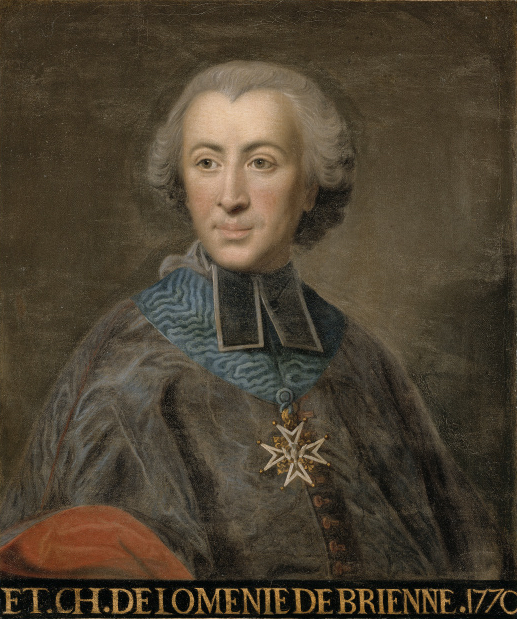
Étienne Charles de Brienne, minister of finance 1787–88

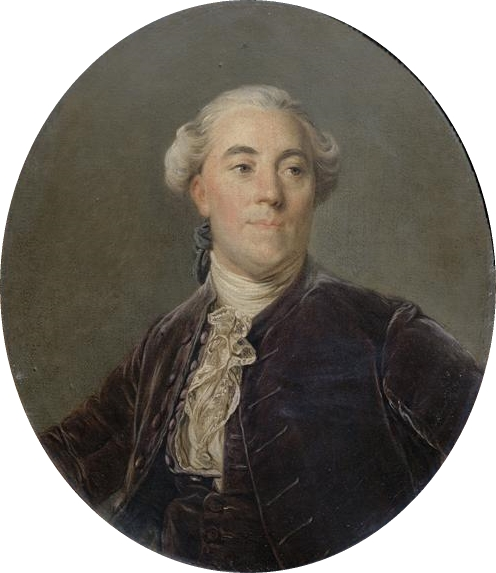
Jacques Necker, minister of finance 1788–90
- May 6: Arrest of Duval d'Eprémesnil, member of the Paris Parlement, for leading resistance to royal absolutism. (Popkin 94)
- June 7: Day of the Tiles in Grenoble, first revolt against the king.
- July 21: Assembly of Vizille, assembly of the Estates-General of Dauphiné.
- August 8: The royal treasury is declared empty, and the Parlement of Paris refuses to reform the tax system or loan the Crown more money. To win their support for fiscal reforms, the Minister of Finance, Brienne, sets May 5, 1789, for a meeting of the Estates General, an assembly of the nobility, clergy, and commoners (the Third Estate), which has not met since 1614.
- August 16: The treasury suspends payments on the debts of the government.
- August 25: Brienne resigns as Minister of Finance, and is replaced by the Swiss banker Jacques Necker, who is popular with the Third Estate. French bankers and businessmen, who have always held Necker in high regard, agree to loan the state 75 million, on the condition that the Estates General will have full powers to reform the system. Necker was labelled an "author of the revolution" by Napoleon.
- December 27: Over the opposition of the nobles, Necker announces that the representation of the Third Estate will be doubled and that nobles and clergymen will be eligible to sit with the Third Estate.

== 1789 – The Revolution Begins; the Estates-General and the Constituent Assembly ==
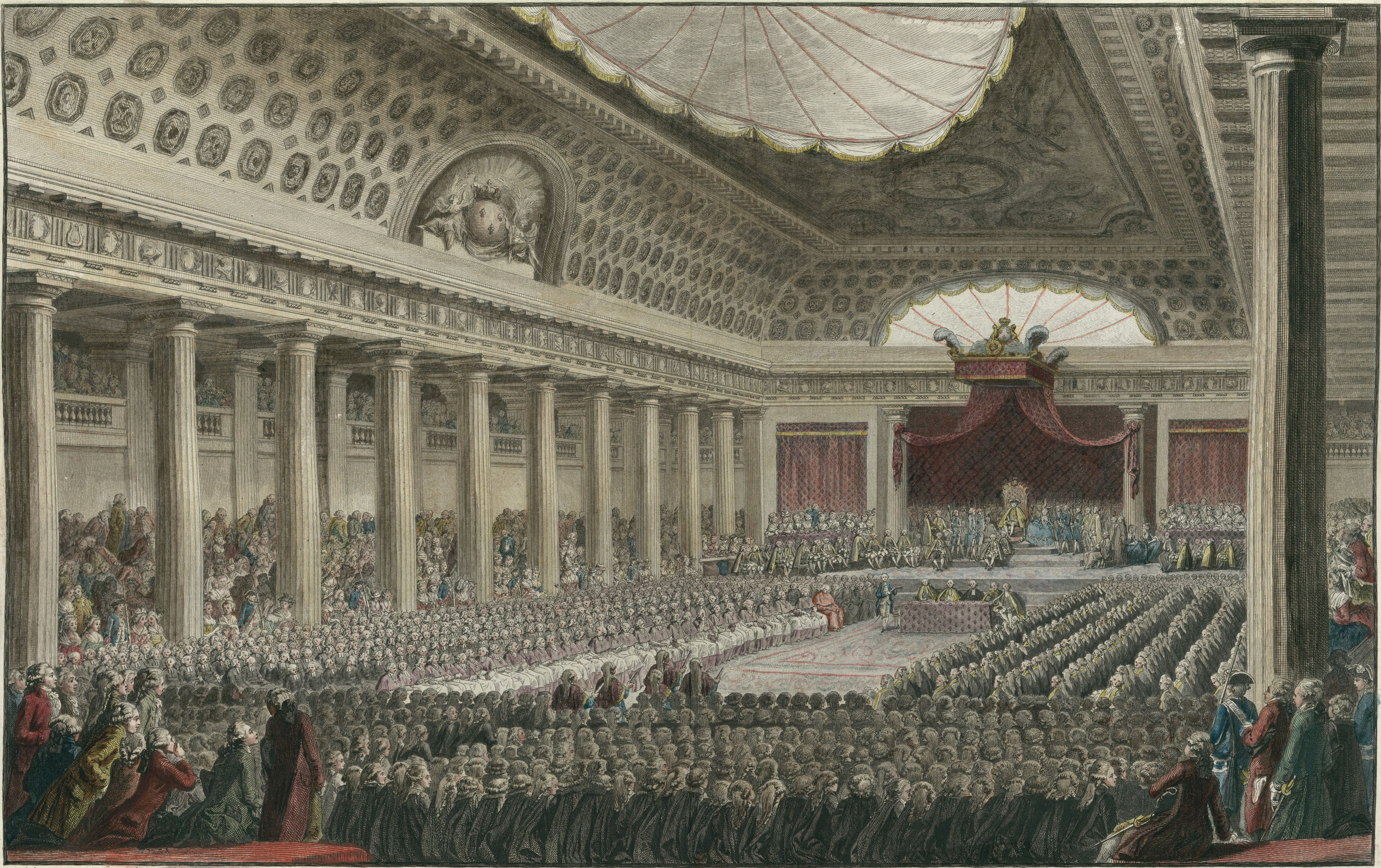
The King opens the meeting of the Estates-General (May 5, 1789)

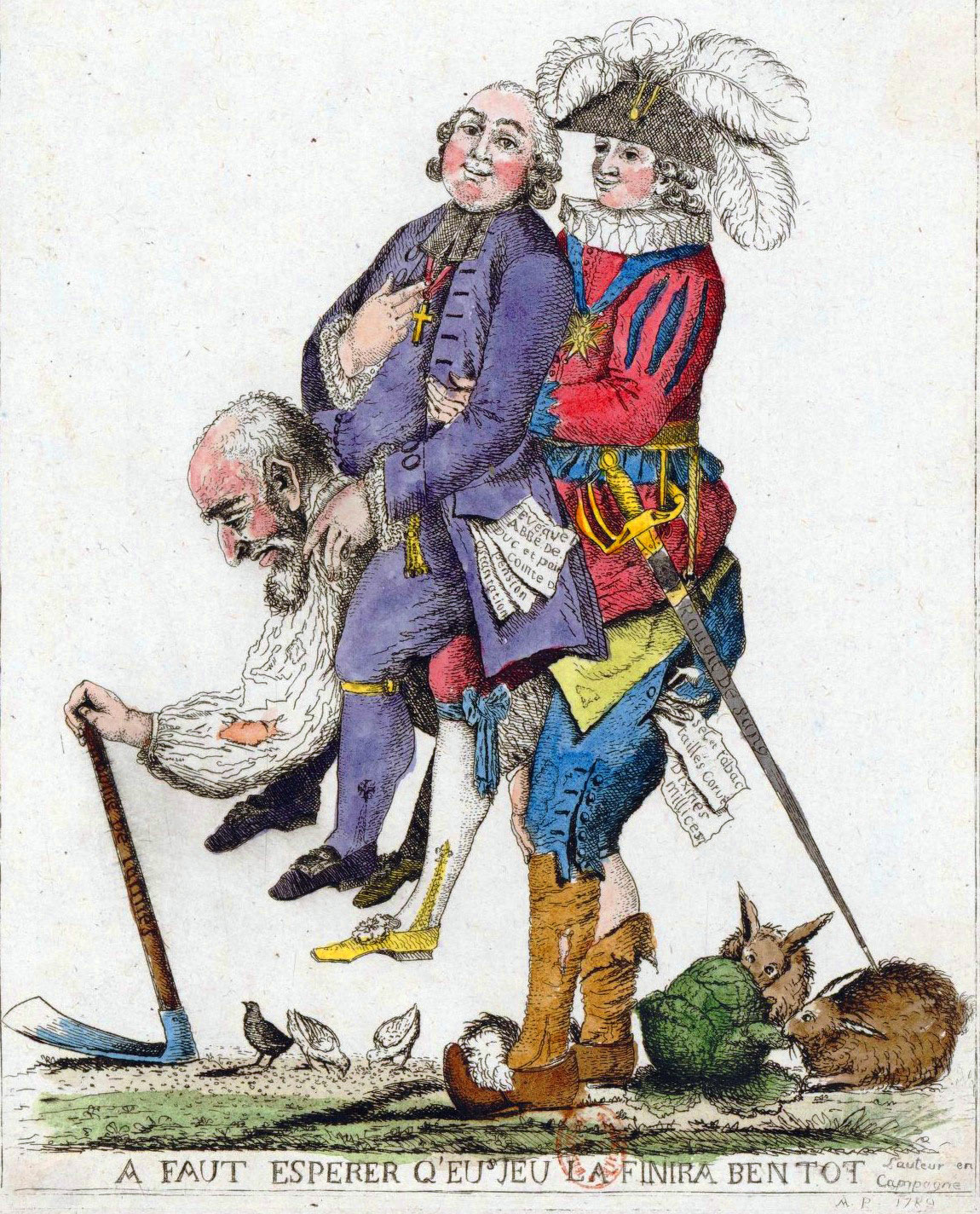
Cartoon showing the Third Estate carrying the weight of the clergy and the nobility (1789)

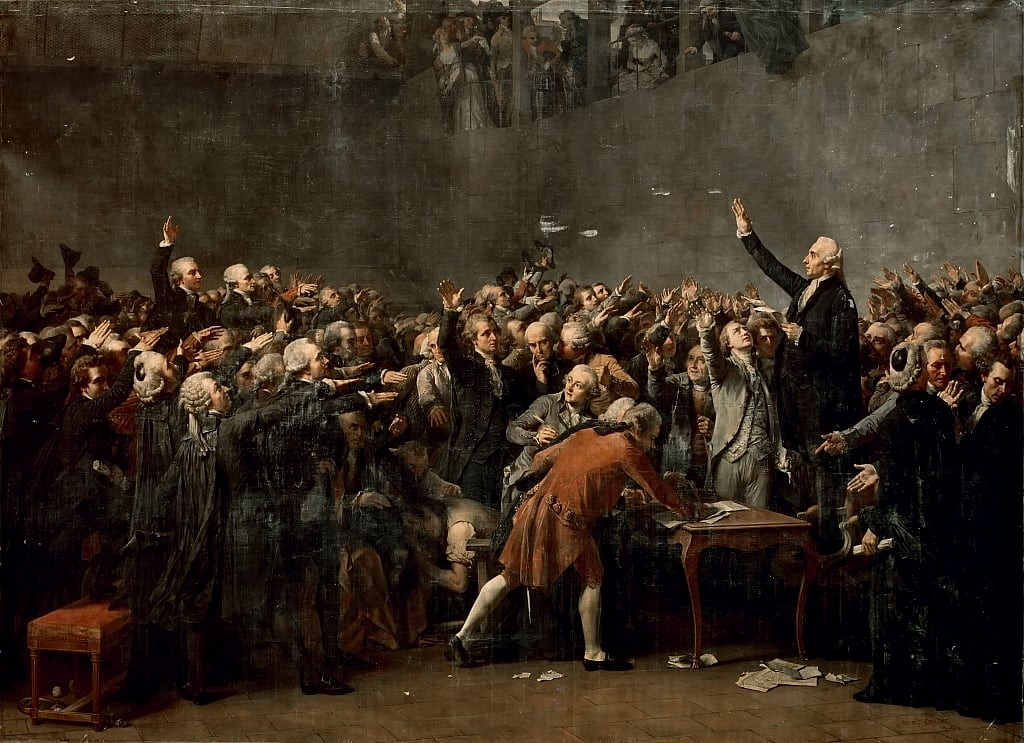
The Tennis Court Oath (June 20, 1789), by Couder

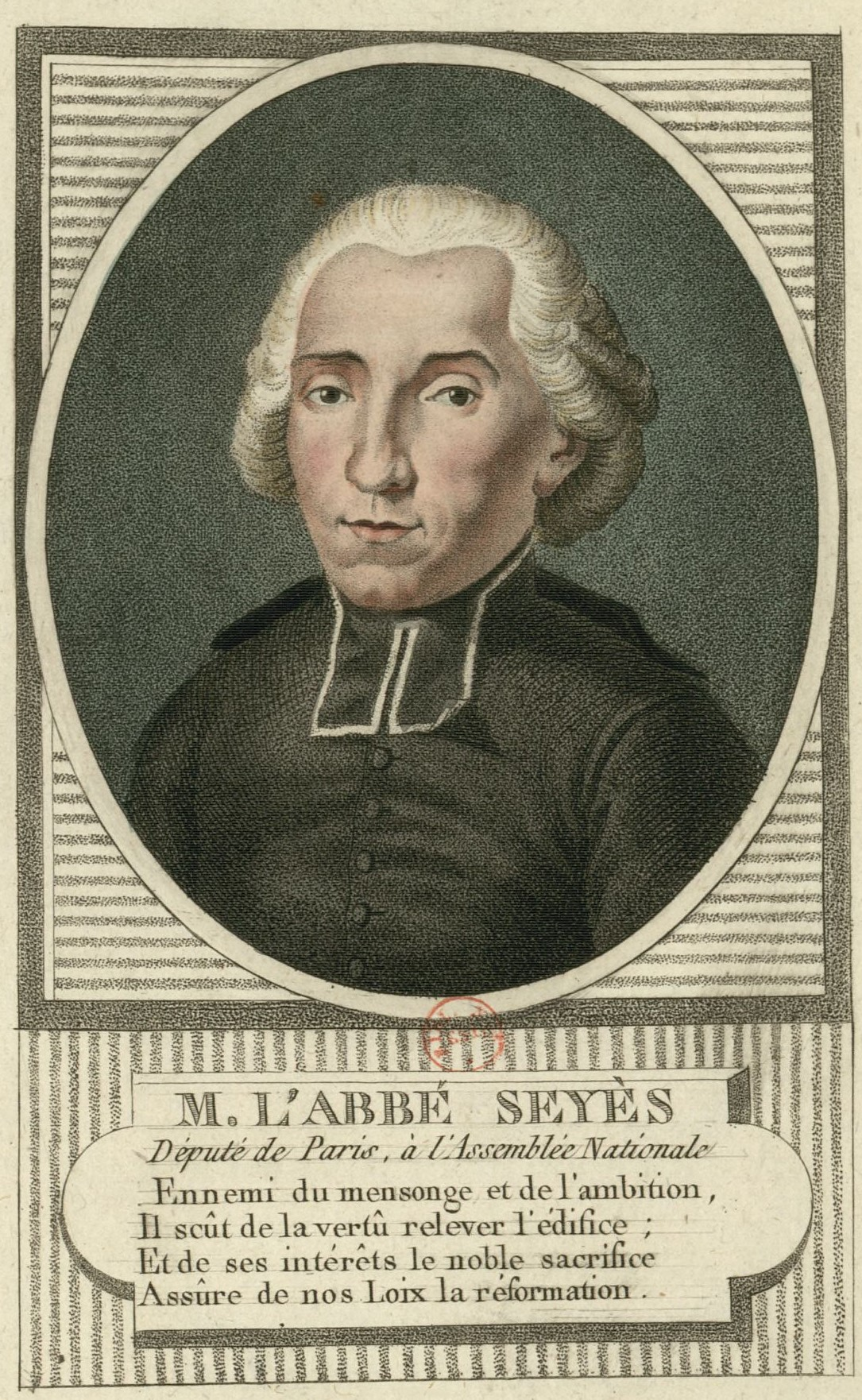
Emmanuel Joseph Sieyès, who proposed that the Third Estate become the National Assembly (June 10, 1789)

January 1789

- January: The Abbé Emmanuel Joseph Sieyès publishes a pamphlet, What is the Third Estate? he writes; "What is the Third Estate? Everything. What has it been until now in the political order? Nothing. What does it demand to be? Something." The pamphlet is widely distributed.
- January 24: King Louis XVI convokes elections for delegates to the Estates-General

April 1789

- April 27: Riots in Paris by workers of the Réveillon wallpaper factory in the Faubourg Saint-Antoine. Twenty-five workers were killed in battles with police.

May 1789

- May 2: Presentation to the King of the Deputies of the Estates-General at Versailles. The clergy and nobles are welcomed with formal ceremonies and processions, the Third Estate is not.
- May 5: Formal opening of the Estates-General at Versailles.
- May 6: The Deputies of the Third Estate refuses to meet separately from the other Estates, occupy the main hall, and invite the clergy and nobility to join them.
- May 11: The nobility refuses to meet together with the Third Estate, but the clergy hesitates, and suspends the verification of its deputies.
- May 20: The clergy renounces its special tax privileges, and accepts the principle of fiscal equality.
- May 22: The nobility renounces its special tax privileges. However, the three estates are unable to agree on a common program.
- May 25: The Third Estate deputies from Paris, delayed by election procedures, arrive in Versailles.

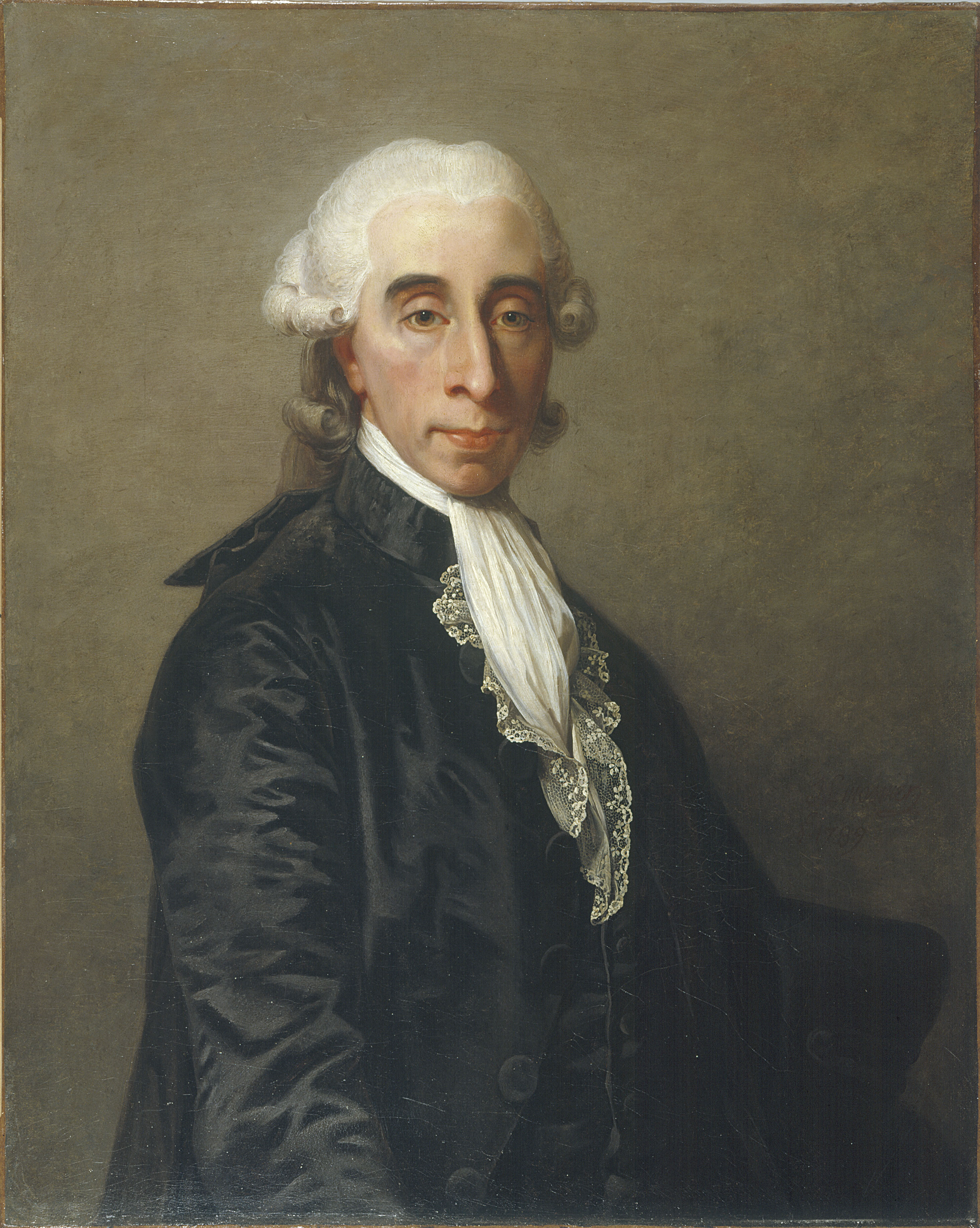
Jean Sylvain Bailly, leader of the Third Estate (1789)

June 1789

- June 3: The scientist Jean Sylvain Bailly is chosen the leader of the Third Estate deputies.
- June 4: Upon the death of seven-year-old Louis Joseph Xavier François, Dauphin of France, the eldest son and heir of Louis XVI, his four-year-old brother, Louis-Charles, Duke of Normandy, becomes the new Dauphin.
- June 6: The deputies of the nobility reject a compromise program proposed by finance minister Jacques Necker.
- June 10: At the suggestion of Sieyès, the Third Estate deputies decide to hold their own meeting, and invite the other Estates to join them.
- June 13–14: Nine deputies from the clergy decide to join the meeting of the Third Estate.
- June 17: On the proposal of Sieyès, the deputies of the Third Estate declare themselves the National Assembly. To ensure popular support, they decree that taxes need only be paid while the Assembly is in session.
- June 19: By a vote of 149 to 137, the deputies of the clergy join the assembly of the Third Estate.
- June 20: On the orders of Louis XVI, the meeting hall of the Third Estate is closed and locked. At the suggestion of Dr. Joseph-Ignace Guillotin, the deputies gather instead in the indoor tennis court, where they swear not to separate until they have given France a new Constitution (the Tennis Court Oath).
- June 21: The Royal Council rejects the financial program of Minister Necker.
- June 22: The new National Assembly meets in the church of Saint Louis in Versailles. One hundred fifty deputies from the clergy attend, along with two deputies from the nobility.
- June 23: Louis XVI personally addresses the Estates-General (a Séance royale), where he invalidates the decisions of the National Assembly and instructs the three estates to continue to meet separately. The king departs followed by the Second- and most of the First-Estate deputies, but the Third-Estate deputies remain in the hall. When the king's master of ceremonies reminds them that Louis has invalidated their decrees, the Comte de Mirabeau, Third-Estate deputy from Aix, boldly shouts that "we are assembled here by the will of the people" and that they would "leave only at the point of a bayonet".
- June 25: 48 nobles, headed by Louis Philippe II, Duke of Orléans, join the Assembly.
- June 27: Louis XVI reverses course, instructs the nobility and clergy to meet with the other estates, and recognizes the new Assembly. At the same time, he orders reliable military units, largely composed of Swiss and German mercenaries, to Paris.
- June 30: A crowd invades the prison of the Abbey of Saint-Germain-des-Prés and liberates soldiers who had been imprisoned for attending meetings of political clubs.

July 1789

- July 6: The National Assembly forms a committee of thirty members to write a new Constitution.
- July 8: As tensions mount, the Comte de Mirabeau, Third-Estate deputy from Aix, demands that the Gardes Françaises of the military household of the king of France be moved out of Paris, and that a new civil guard be created within the city.
- July 9: The National Assembly reconstitutes itself as the National Constituent Assembly.
- July 11: Louis XVI abruptly dismisses Necker. Parisians respond by burning the unpopular customs barriers, and invading and looting the monastery of the Lazaristes. Skirmishes between the cavalrymen of the Régiment de Royal-Allemand of the King's Guard and the angry crowd outside the Tuileries Palace. The Gardes Françaises largely take the side of the crowd.
- July 13: The National Assembly declares itself in permanent session. At the Hôtel de Ville, city leaders begin to form a governing committee and an armed militia.
- July 14: Storming of the Bastille. A large armed crowd besieges the Bastille, which holds only seven prisoners but has a large supply of gunpowder, which the crowd wants. After several hours of resistance, the governor of the fortress, de Launay, finally surrenders; as he exits, he is killed by the crowd. The crowd also kills de Flesselles, the provost of the Paris merchants.

=== July 14, 1789 – The Siege and Surrender of the Bastille ===
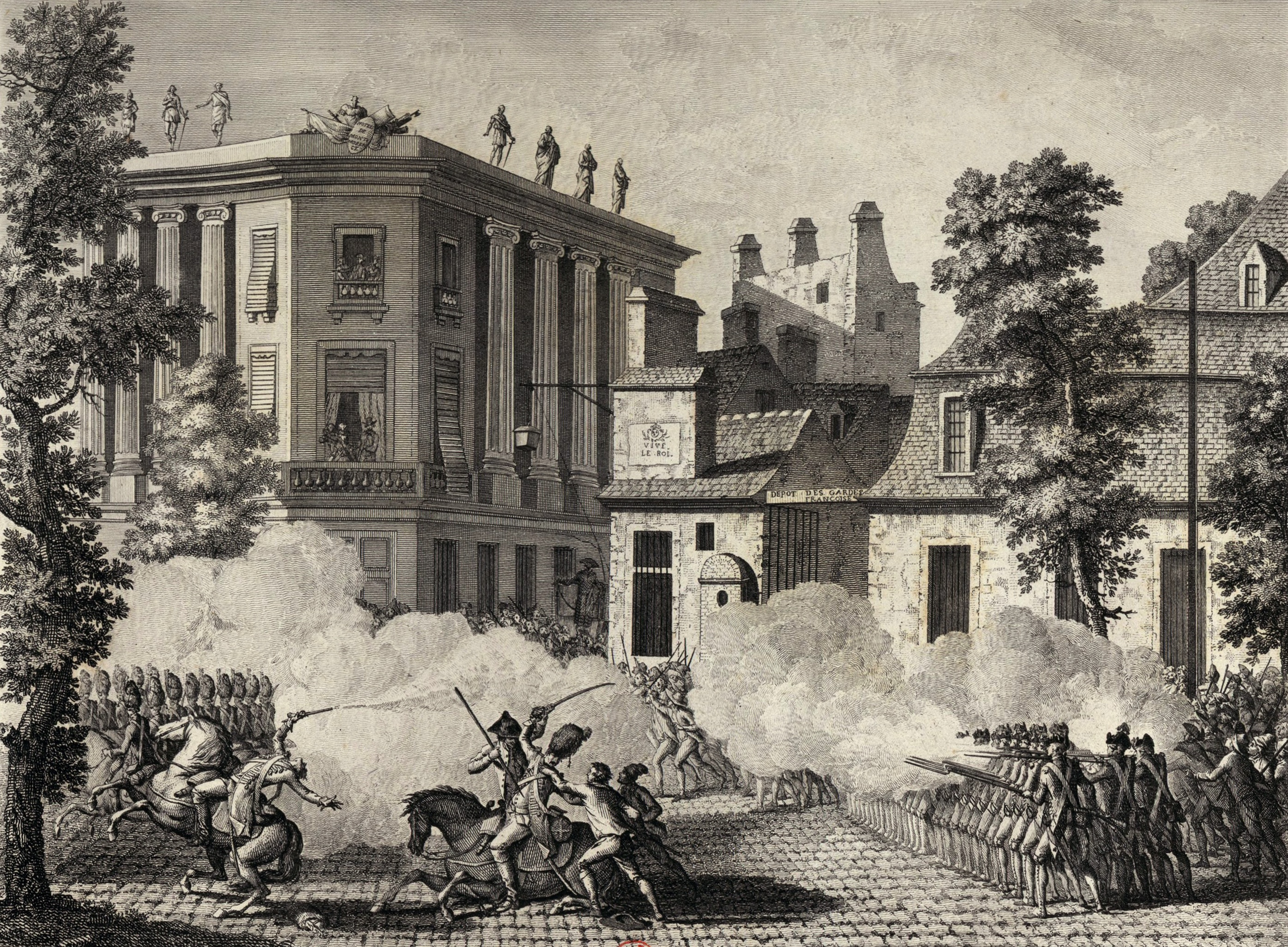
German soldiers of the King's guard skirmish with the Gardes-Française in Paris (July 12, 1789)

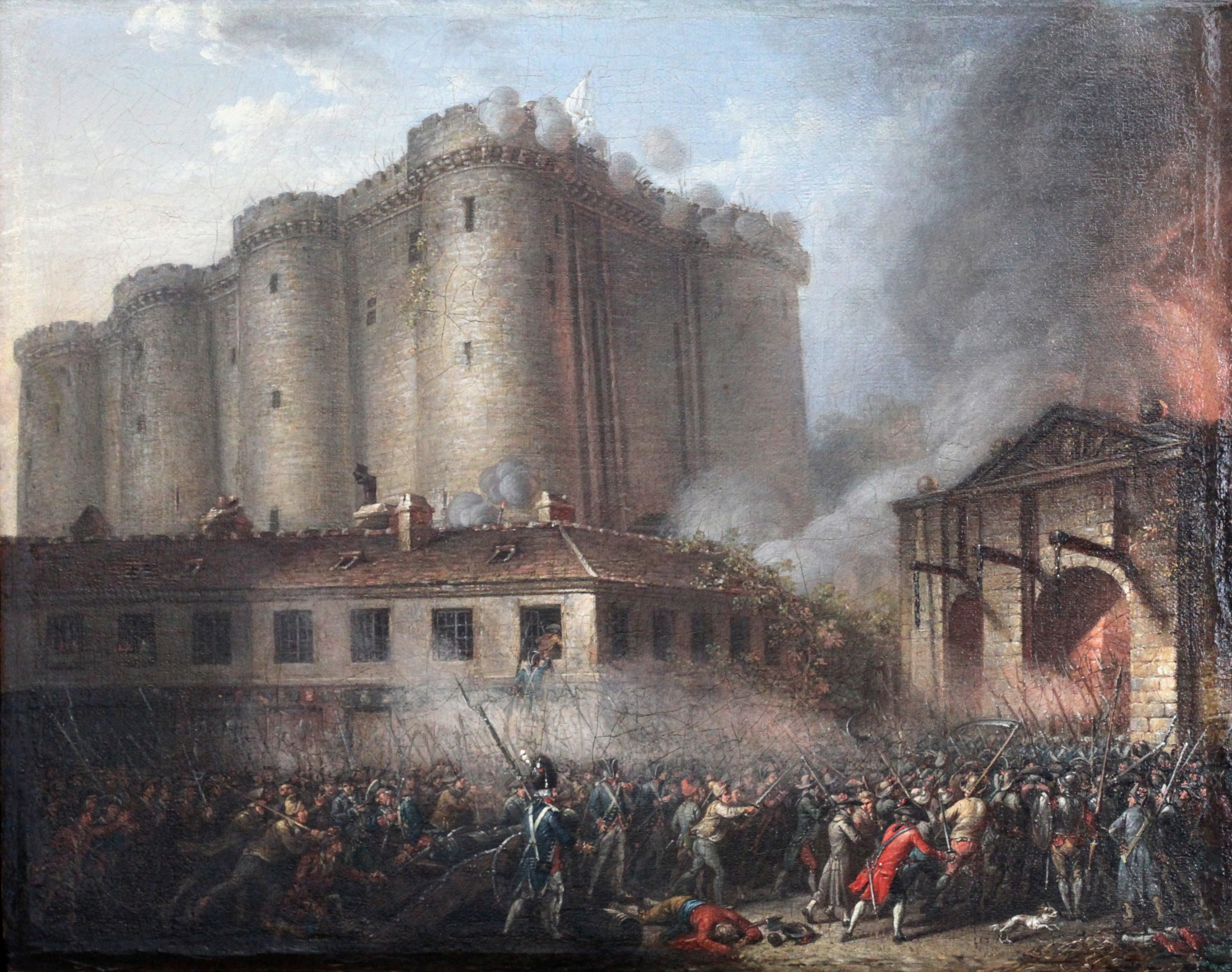
Storming of the Bastille (July 14, 1789)

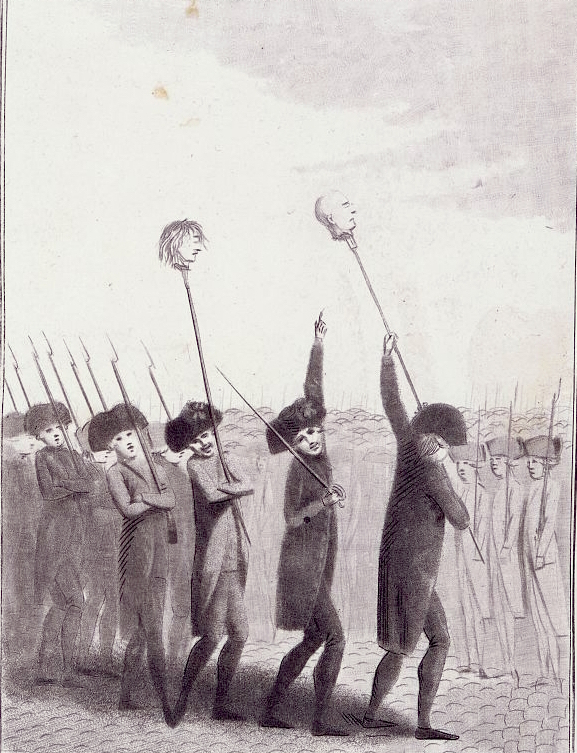
Parade of the heads of the governor of the Bastille and the Provost of Paris merchants (July 14, 1789)

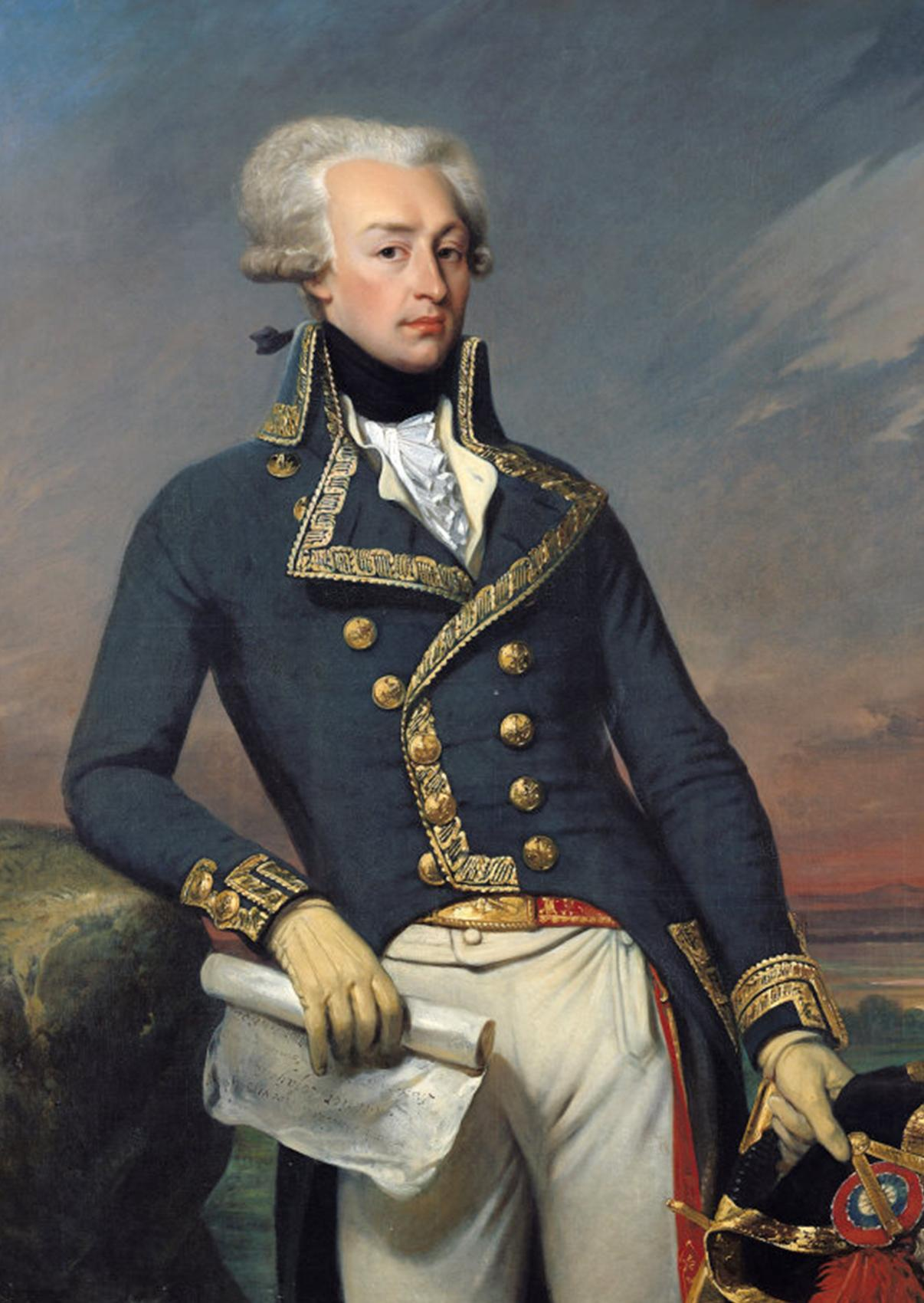
Lafayette in 1791

- July 15: The astronomer and mathematician Jean Sylvain Bailly is named mayor of Paris, and Lafayette is appointed Commander of the newly formed National Guard.
- July 16: The King reinstates Necker as finance minister and withdraws royal troops from the center of the city. The new elected Paris assembly votes the destruction of the Bastille fortress. Similar committees and local militias are formed in Lyon, Rennes, and in other large French cities.
- July 17: The King visits Paris, where he is welcomed at the Hôtel de Ville by Bailly and Lafayette, and wears the tricolor cockade. Sensing what is ahead, several prominent members of the nobility, including the Count of Artois, the Prince de Condé, the Duke of Enghien, the Baron de Breteuil, the Duke of Broglie, the Duke of Polignac and his wife become the first of a wave of émigrés to leave France.
- July 18: Camille Desmoulins begins publication of 'La France libre', demanding a much more radical revolution and calling for a republic arguing that revolutionary violence is justified.
- July 22: An armed mob on the Place de Grève massacres Berthier de Sauvigny, Intendant of Paris, and his father-in-law, accused of speculating in grain.
- July 21 – August 14: the Great Fear: Riots and peasant revolts in Strasbourg (July 21), Le Mans (July 23), Colmar, Alsace, and Hainaut (July 25).
- July 28: Jacques Pierre Brissot begins publication of Le Patriote français, an influential newspaper of the revolutionary movement known as the Girondins.

August 1789

- August 4:
  - The King appoints a government of reformist ministers around Necker.
  - August Decrees: The Assembly votes to abolish the privileges and feudal rights of the nobility.
- August 7: Publication of "A plot uncovered to lull the people to sleep" by Jean-Paul Marat, denouncing the reforms of August 4 as insufficient and demanding a much more radical revolution. Marat quickly becomes the voice of the most turbulent sans-culottes faction of the Revolution.
- August 23: The Assembly proclaims freedom of religious opinions.
- August 24: The Assembly proclaims freedom of speech.

=== August 27, 1789 – Declaration of the Rights of Man and of the Citizen ===
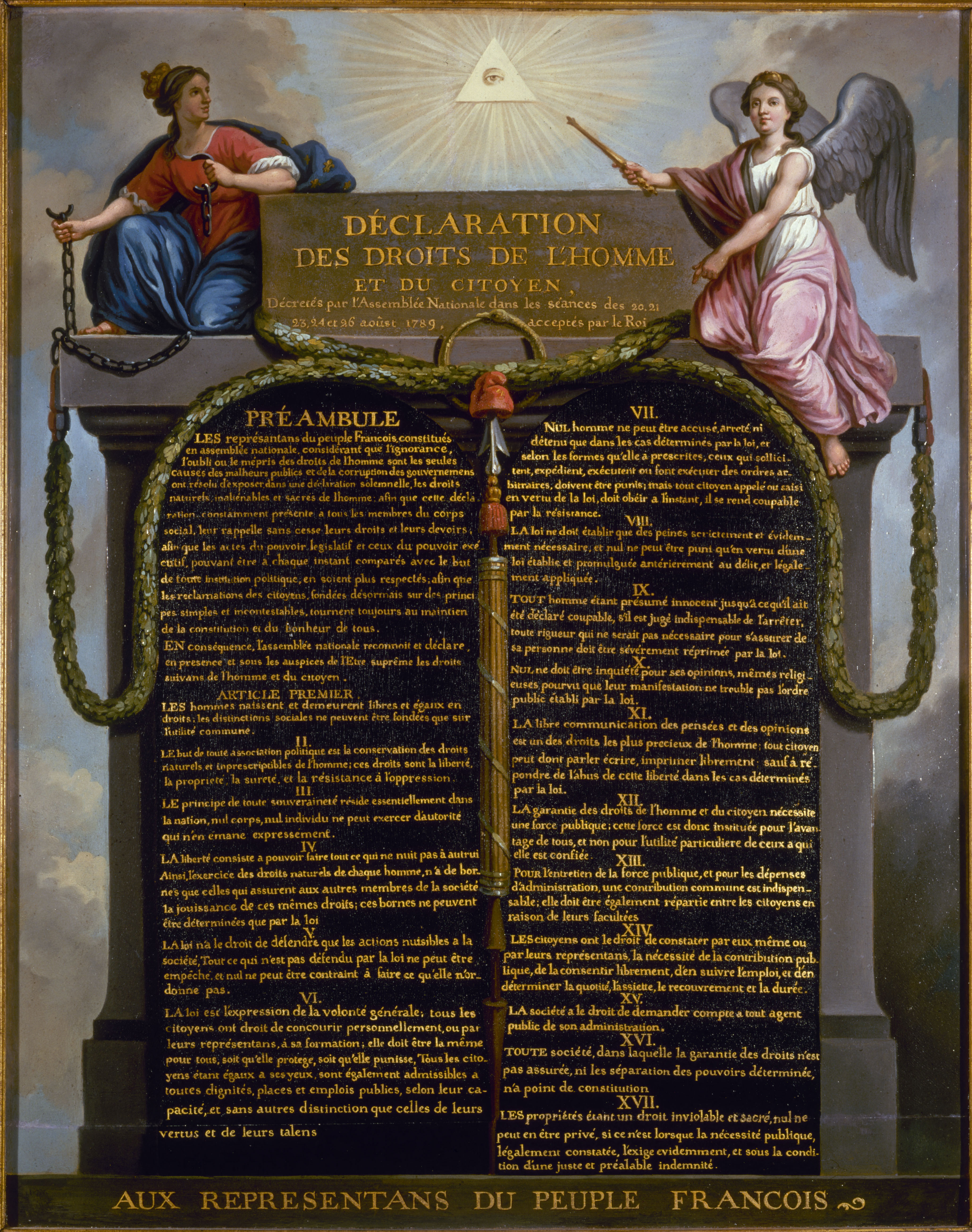
Declaration of the Rights of Man and of the Citizen

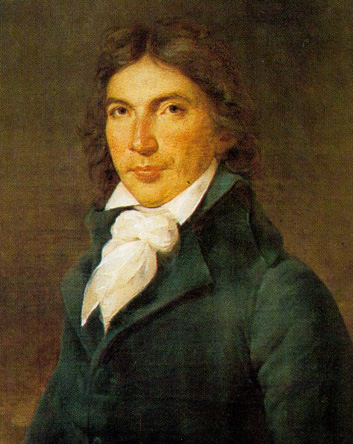
Camille Desmoulins

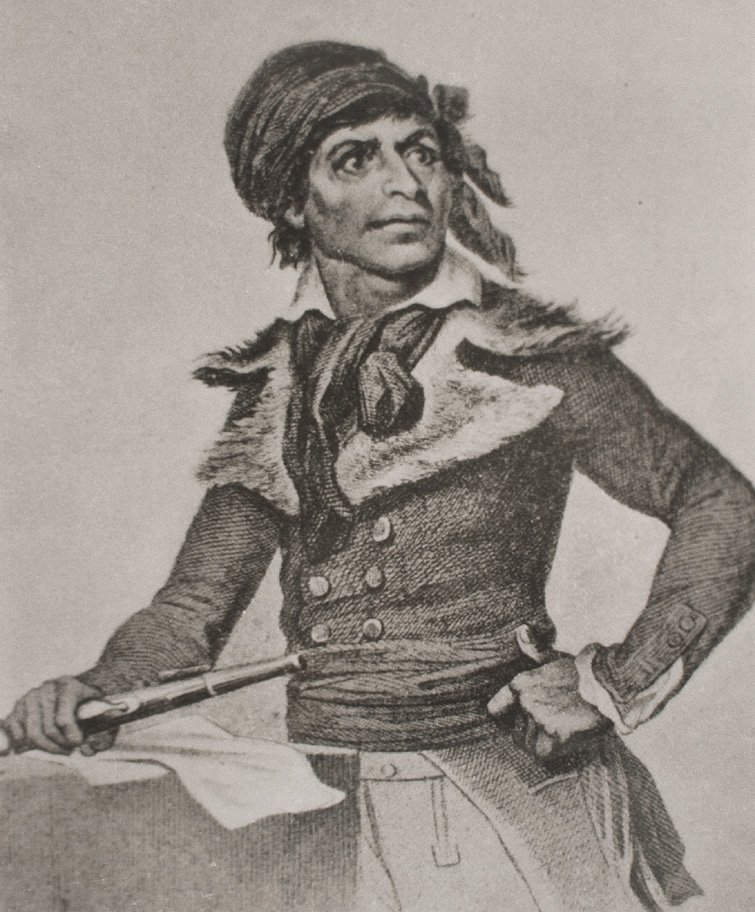
Jean-Paul Marat
- August 27: The Assembly adopts the Declaration of the Rights of Man and of the Citizen, drafted largely by Lafayette.
- August 28: The Assembly debates giving the King the power to veto legislation.
- August 30: Camille Desmoulins organizes an uprising at the Palais-Royal to block the proposed veto for the King and to force the King to return to Paris. The uprising fails.
- August 31: The Constitution Committee of the Assembly proposes a two-house parliament and a royal right of veto.
- September 9: The Mayor of Troyes is assassinated by a mob.
- September 11: The National Assembly gives the King the power to temporarily veto laws for two legislative sessions.
- September 15: Desmoulins publishes Discours de la lanterne aux Parisiens, a radical pamphlet justifying political violence and exalting the Parisian mob.
- September 16: First issue of Jean Paul Marat's newspaper, L'Ami du peuple, proposing a radical social and political revolution.
- September 19: Election of a new municipal assembly in Paris, with three hundred members elected by districts.
- October 1: At the banquet des Gardes du Corps du Roi in Versailles, which Louis XVI, Marie-Antoinette and the Dauphin attended at dessert time, the King's guards put on the white royal cocarde. The false news quickly reaches Paris that the guards had trampled on the tricolor and caused outrage.

=== October 5, 1789 – Women's March on Versailles ===
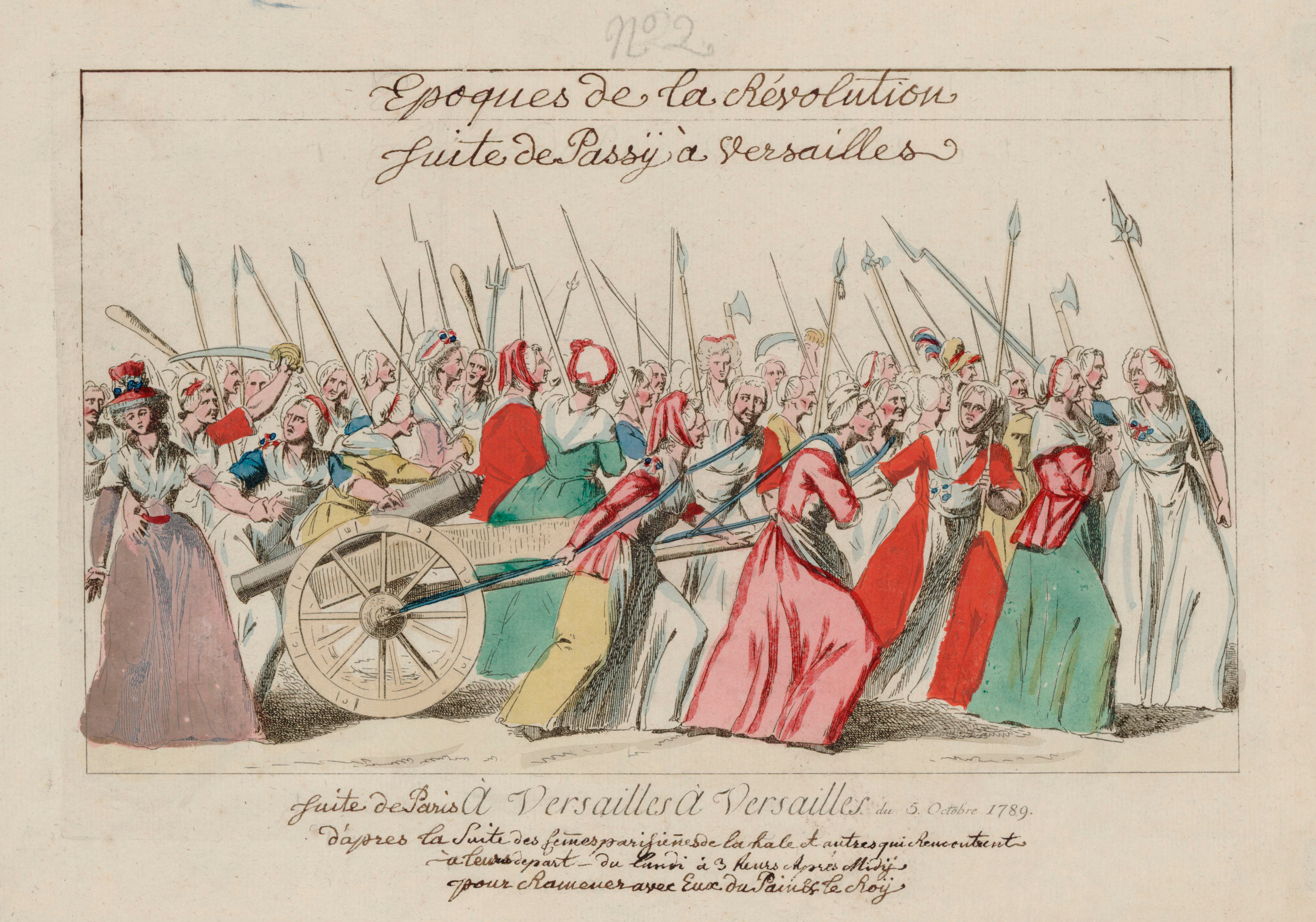
The Women's March on Versailles (October 5–6, 1789)

- October 5: Marat's newspaper demands a march on Versailles to protest the insult to the cocarde tricolor. Thousands of women take part in the march, joined in the evening by the Paris national guard led by Lafayette.
- October 6: After an orderly march, a crowd of women invade the Palace. The women demand that the King and his family accompany them back to Paris, and the King agrees. The National Assembly also decides to relocate to Paris.
- October 10: The Assembly names Lafayette commander of the regular army in and around Paris. The Assembly also modifies the royal title from "King of France and Navarre" to "King of the French". Joseph-Ignace Guillotin, a doctor, member of the Assembly, proposes a new and more humane form of public execution, which eventually is named after him, the guillotine.
- October 12: Louis XVI secretly writes to king Charles IV of Spain, complaining of mistreatment. The Count of Artois secretly writes to Joseph II of Austria requesting a military intervention in France.
- October 19: The National Assembly holds its first meeting in Paris, in the chapel of the archbishop's residence next to Notre Dame Cathedral.
- October 21: The Assembly declares a state of martial law to prevent future uprisings.
- November 2: The Assembly votes to place property of the Church at the disposition of the Nation.
- November 9: The Assembly moves to the Salle du Manège, the former riding school near the Tuileries Palace.
- November 28: First issue of Desmoulins' weekly Histoire des Révolutions de France et de Brabant, savagely attacking royalists and aristocrats.
- November: the Breton Club is reconstituted in Paris at the Saint-Honore monastery of Dominicans, who were more popularly known as Jacobins, under the name Society of Friends of the Constitution
- December 1: Revolt by the sailors of the French Navy in Toulon, who arrest Admiral d'Albert.
- December 9: The Assembly decides to divide France into departments, in place of the former provinces of France.
- December 19: Introduction of the assignat, a form of currency based not on silver, but on the value of the property of the Church confiscated by the State.
- December 24: The Assembly decrees that Protestants are eligible to hold public office; Jews are still excluded.

== 1790 – the Rise of the Political Clubs ==
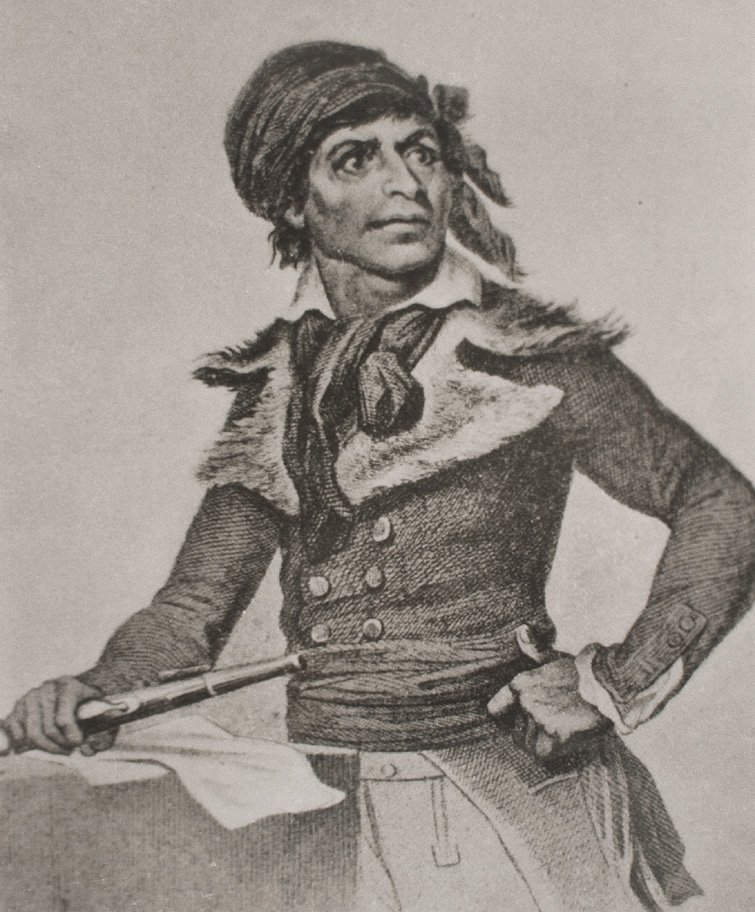
Jean-Paul Marat

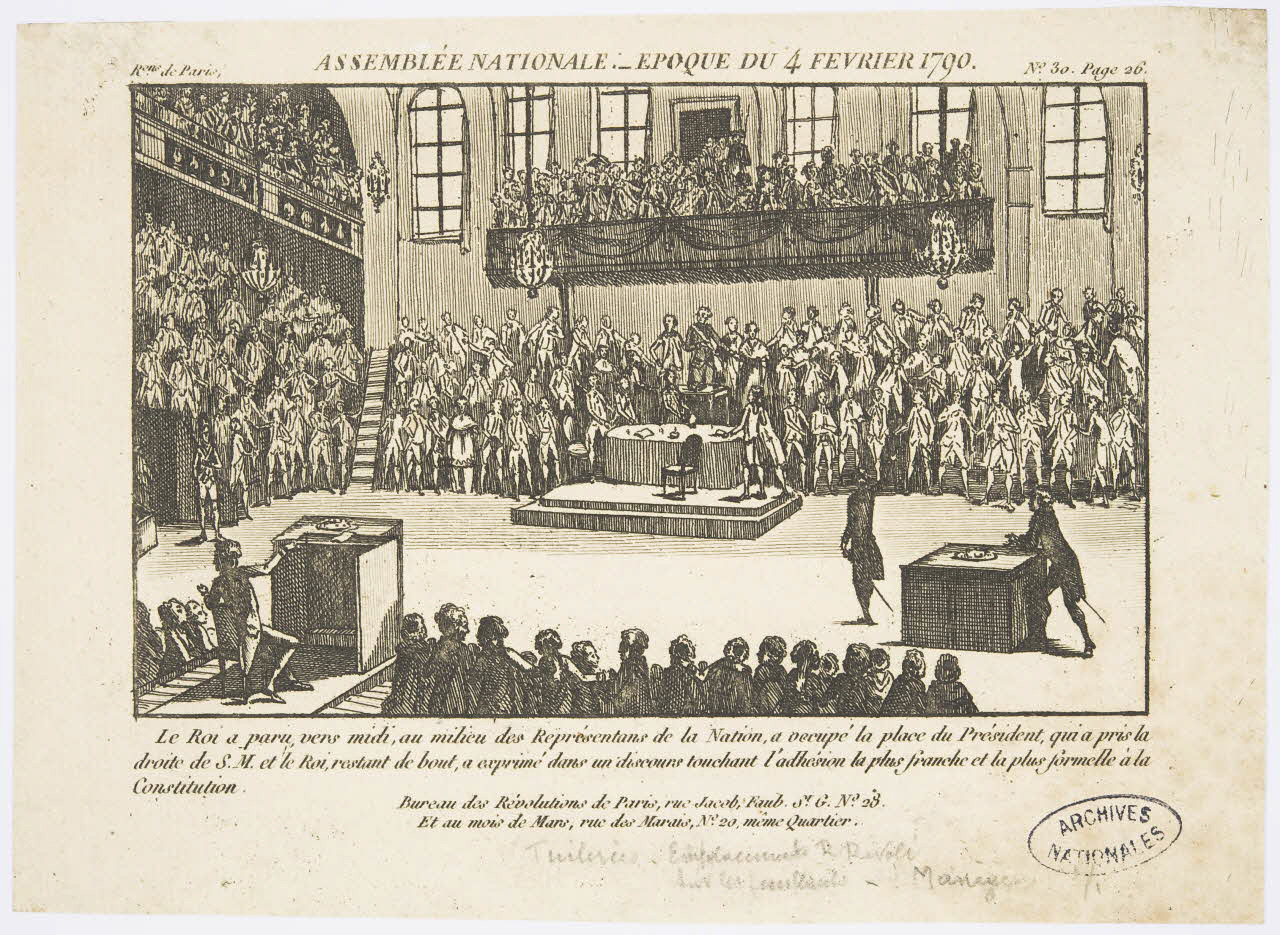
Meeting of the National Assembly (February 4, 1790)

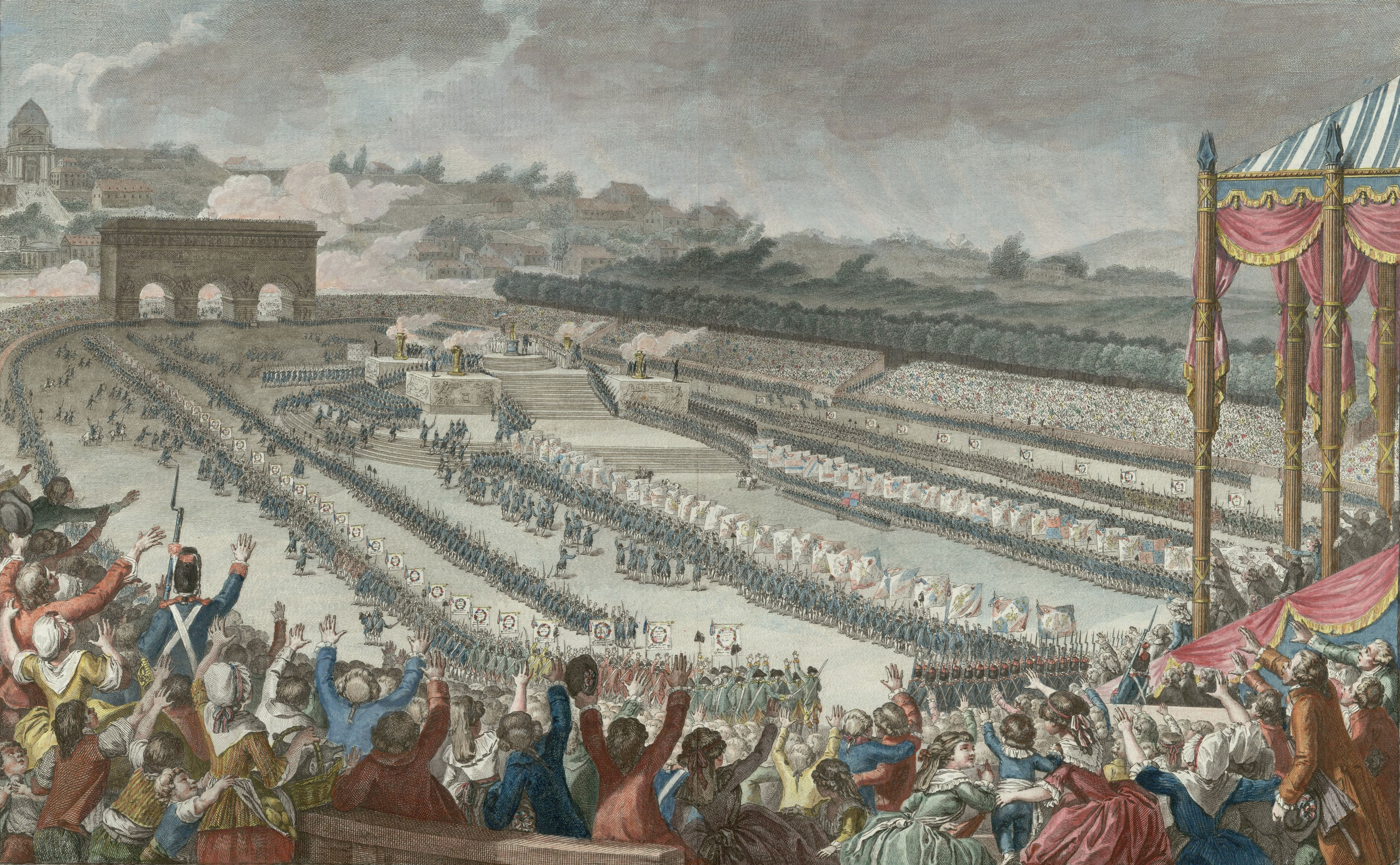
Fête de la Fédération (July 14, 1790)
- January 7: Riot in Versailles demanding lower bread prices.
- January 18: Marat publishes a fierce attack on finance minister Necker.
- January 22: Paris municipal police try to arrest Marat for his violent attacks on the government, but he is defended by a crowd of sans-culottes and escapes to London.
- February 13: The Assembly forbids the taking of religious vows and suppresses the contemplative religious orders.
- February 23: The Assembly requires curés (parish priests) in churches across France to read aloud the decrees of the Assembly.
- February 28: The Assembly abolishes the requirement that army officers be members of the nobility.
- March 8: The Assembly decides to continue the institution of slavery in French colonies, but permits the establishment of colonial assemblies.
- March 12: The Assembly approves the sale of the property of the church by municipalities
- March 29: Pope Pius VI condemns the Declaration of the Rights of Man and of the Citizen in a secret consistory.
- April 5 – June 10: A series of pro-catholic and anti-revolutionary riots in the French provinces; in Vannes (April 5), Nîmes (April 6), Toulouse (April 18), Toulon (May 3), and Avignon (June 10) protesting measures taken against the church.
- April 17: Foundation of the Cordeliers club, which meets in the former convent of that name. It becomes one of the most vocal proponents of radical change.
- April 30: Riots in Marseille. Three forts are captured, and the commander of Fort Saint-Jean, the Chevalier de Beausset, is assassinated.
- May 12: Lafayette and Jean Sylvain Bailly institute the Society of 1789.
- May 15: Law passed that allows for the redemption of manorial dues.
- May 18: Marat returns to Paris and resumes publication of L'Ami du people.
- May 22: The Assembly decides that it alone can decide issues of war and peace, but that the war cannot be declared without the proposition and sanction by the King.
- May 30: Lyon celebrates the Revolution with a Fête de la Fédération. Lille holds a similar event on June 6. Strasbourg on June 13, Rouen on June 19.
- June 3: Uprising of biracial residents of the French colony of Martinique.
- June 19: The Assembly abolishes the titles, orders, and other privileges of the hereditary nobility.
- June 26: Avignon, then under the rule of the Pope, asks to be joined to France. The Assembly, wishing to avoid a confrontation with Pope Pius VI, delays a decision.
- June 26: Diplomats of England, Austria, Prussia and the United Provinces meet at Reichenbach to discuss possible military intervention against the French Revolution.
- July 12: The Assembly adopts the final text on the status of the French clergy. Clergymen lose their special status, and are required to take an oath of allegiance to the government.

=== July 14, 1790 – Fête de la Fédération ===
- July 14: The Fête de la Fédération is held on the Champ de Mars in Paris to celebrate the first anniversary of the Revolution. The event is attended by the king and queen, the National Assembly, the government, and a huge crowd. Lafayette takes a civic oath vowing to "be ever faithful to the nation, to the law, and to the king; to support with our utmost power the constitution decreed by the National Assembly, and accepted by the king." This oath is taken by his troops, as well as the king. The Fête de la Fédération is the last event to unite all the different factions in Paris during the Revolution.
- July 23: The Pope writes a secret letter to Louis XVI, promising to condemn the Assembly's abolition of the special status of the French clergy.
- July 26: Marat publishes a demand for the immediate execution of five to six hundred aristocrats to save the Revolution.
- July 28: The Assembly refuses to allow Austrian troops to cross French territory to suppress an uprising in Belgium, inspired by the French Revolution.
- July 31: The Assembly decides to take legal action against Marat and Camille Desmoulins because of their calls for revolutionary violence.
- August 16: The Assembly establishes positions of justices of the peace around the country to replace the traditional courts held by the local nobles.
- August 16: The Assembly calls for the re-establishment of discipline in the army.
- August 31: Battles in Nancy between rebellious soldiers of the army and the national guard units of the city, who support Lafayette and the Assembly.
- September 4: Necker, the finance minister, is dismissed. The National Assembly takes charge of the public treasury.
- September 16: Mutiny of sailors of the French fleet at Brest.
- October 6: Louis XVI writes his cousin, Charles IV of Spain, to express his hostility to the new status of the French clergy.
- October 12: The Assembly dissolves the local assembly of Saint-Domingue (now Haiti) and again reaffirms the institution of slavery.
- October 21: The Assembly decrees that the tricolor will replace the white flag and fleur-de-lys of the French monarchy as emblem of France.
- November 4: Insurrection in the French colony of Isle de France (now Mauritius).
- November 25: Uprising of black slaves in the French colony of Saint-Domingue (now Haiti).
- November 27: The Assembly decrees that all members of the clergy must take an oath to the Nation, the Law and the King. A large majority of French clergymen refuse to take the oath.
- December 3: Louis XVI writes to King Frederick William II of Prussia asking for a military intervention by European monarchs to restore his authority.
- December 27: Thirty-nine deputies of the Assembly, who are also clergymen, take an oath of allegiance to the government. However, a majority of clergymen serving in the Assembly refuse to take the oath.

== 1791 – The unsuccessful flight of the Royal Family from Paris ==
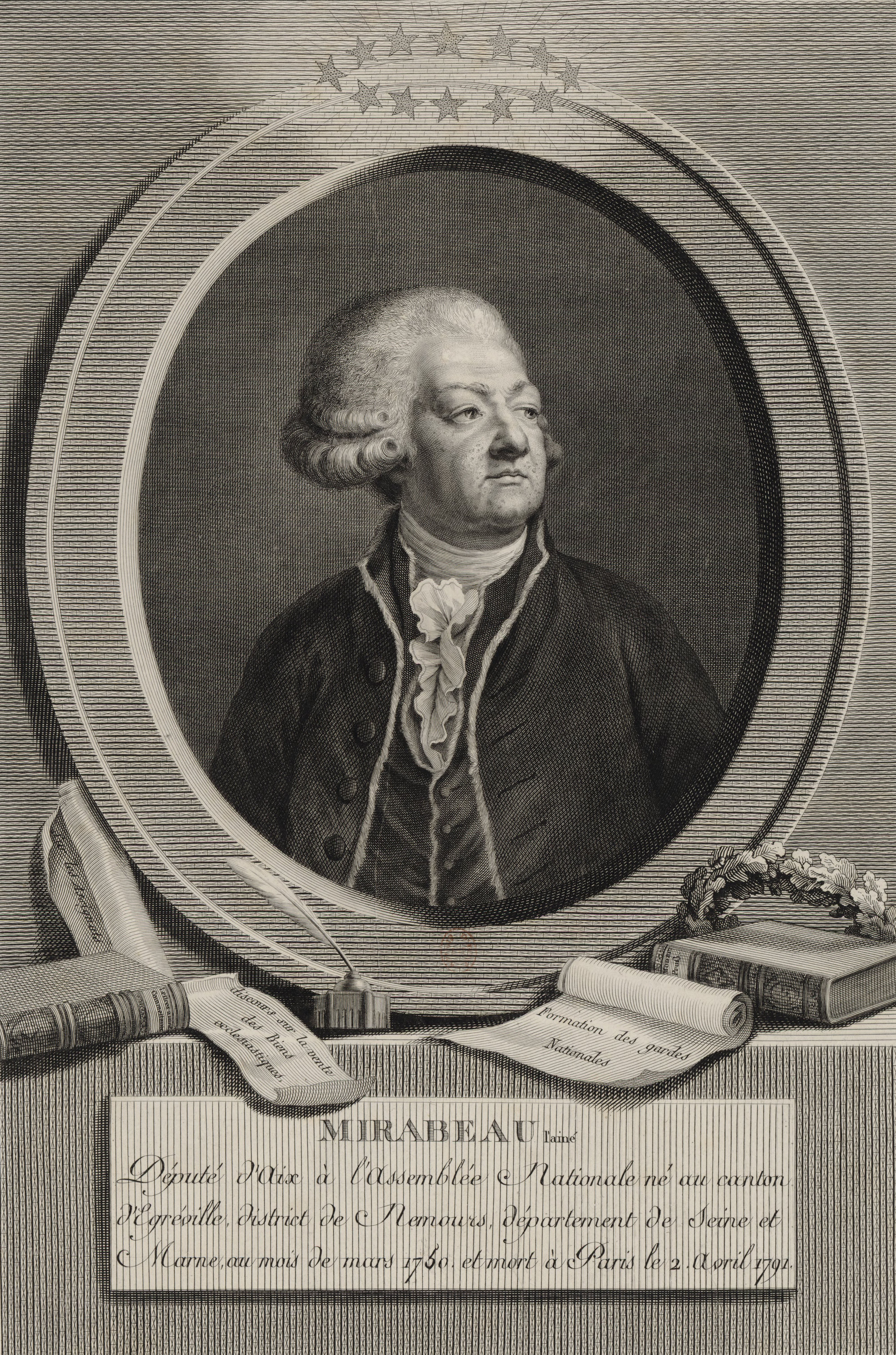
The comte de Mirabeau (1791)

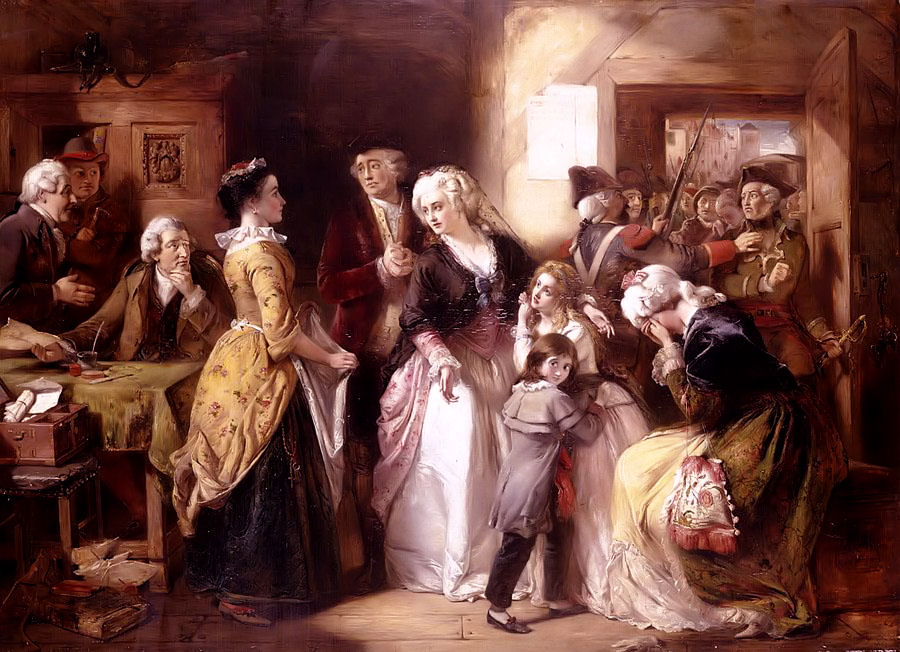
The King and his family are recognized and arrested at Varennes (June 21, 1791)
- January 1: Mirabeau elected President of the Assembly
- January 3: Priests are ordered to take an oath to the Nation within twenty-four hours. A majority of clerical members of the Assembly refuse to take the oath.
- February 19: Mesdames, the daughters of Louis XV and aunts of Louis XVI, depart France for exile.
- February 24: Constitutional bishops, who have taken an oath to the State, replace the former Church hierarchy.
- February 28: Day of Daggers. Lafayette orders the arrest of 400 armed aristocrats who have gathered at the Tuileries Palace to protect the royal family. They are freed on March 13.
- March 2: Abolition of the traditional trade guilds.
- March 3: The Assembly orders that the silver objects owned by the Church be melted down and sold to fund the government.
- March 10: Pope Pius VI condemns the Civil Constitution of the Clergy
- March 25: Diplomatic relations broken between France and the Vatican.
- April 2: Death of Mirabeau.
- April 3: The Assembly proposes transforming the new church of Sainte Geneviève, not yet consecrated, into the Panthéon, a mausoleum for illustrious citizens of France.
- April 13: Encyclical of Pope Pius VI condemns the Civil Constitution of the Clergy.
- April 18: The National Guard, despite orders from Lafayette, blocks the royal family from going to the Château de Saint-Cloud to celebrate Easter.
- May 4: The remains of Mirabeau are the first to be placed in the new Panthéon.
- May 16: On a proposal of Robespierre, the Assembly votes to forbid members of the current Assembly to become candidates for the next Assembly.
- May 30: The Assembly orders the transfers of the ashes of Voltaire to the Panthéon.
- May 30: Robespierre gives a passionate speech in the Assembly in favour of abolishing the death penalty in its entirety.
- June 14: The Chapelier Law is passed by the Assembly, abolishing corporations and forbidding labor unions and strikes.
- June 15: The Assembly forbids priests to wear ecclesiastical robes outside churches.

=== June 20–21, 1791 – The Royal Family flees Paris ===
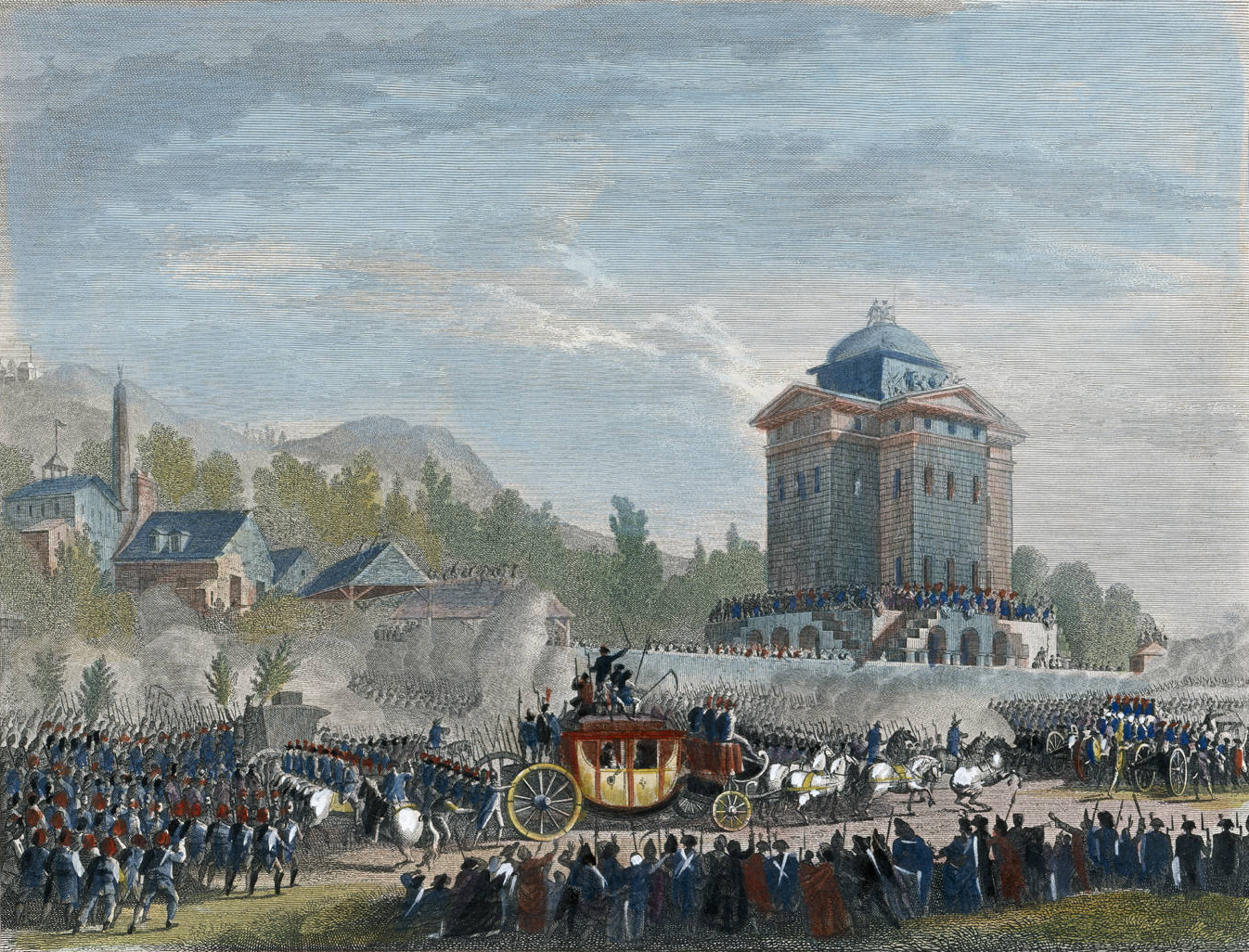
King Louis XVI returns to Paris after his attempted flight (June 25, 1791)

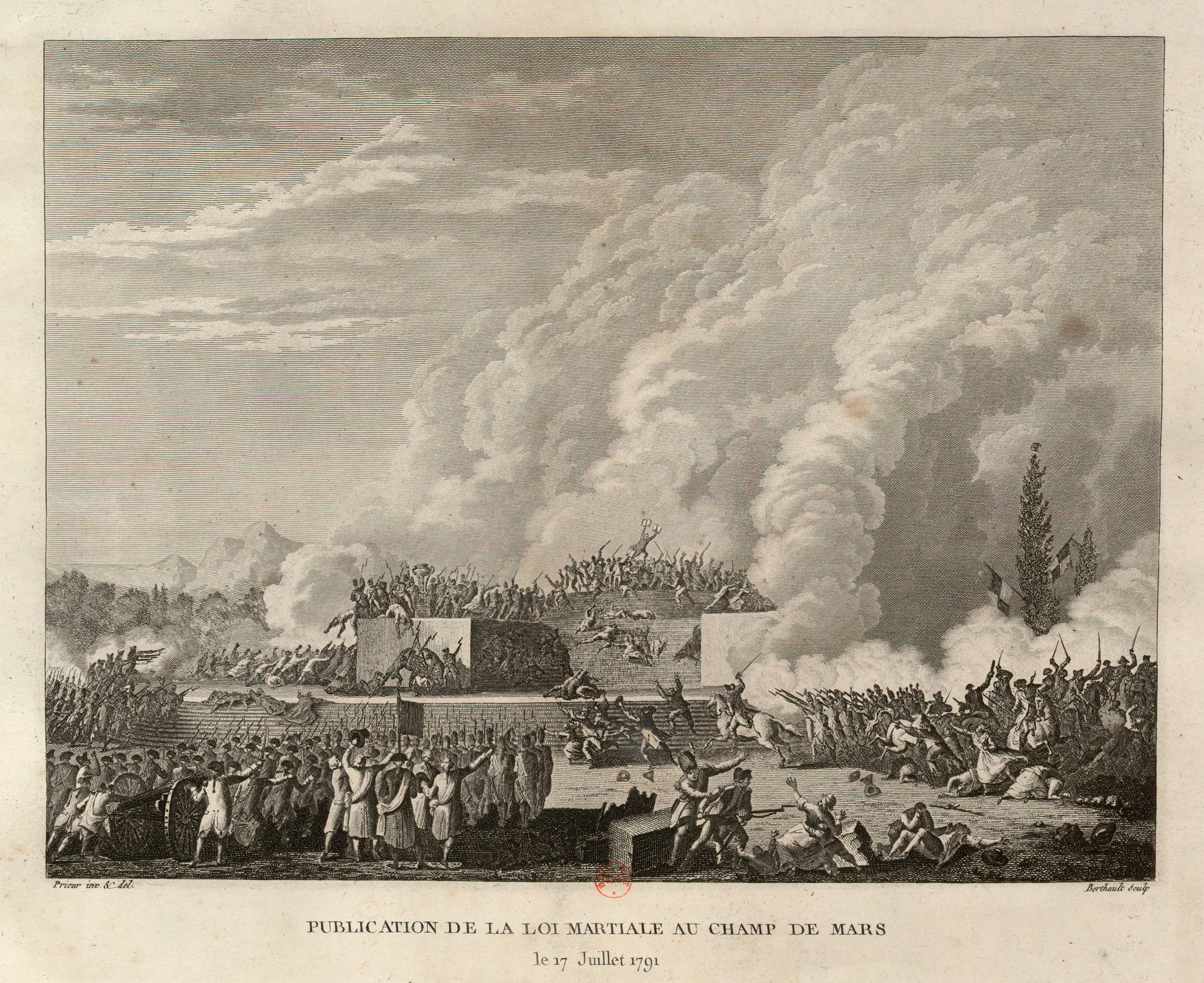
The National Guard fires on demonstrators in the Champ de Mars (July 17, 1791)

- June 20–21: The Flight to Varennes. In the night of 20–21 June, the King, the Queen and their children slip out of the Tuileries Palace and flee by carriage in the direction of Montmédy.
- June 21–22: The King is recognized at Varennes. The Assembly announces that he was taken against his will, and sends three commissioners to bring him back to Paris.
- June 25: Louis XVI returns to Paris. The Assembly suspends his functions until further notice.
- July 5: Emperor Leopold II issues the Padua Circular calling on the royal houses of Europe to come to the aid of Louis XVI, his brother-in-law.
- July 9: The Assembly decrees that émigrés must return to France within two months, or forfeit their property.
- July 11: The ashes of Voltaire are transferred to the Panthéon.
- July 15: National Assembly declares the king inviolable, and cannot be put on trial. Louis XVI suspended from his duties until the ratification of a new Constitution.
- July 16: The more moderate members of the Jacobins club break away to form a new club, the Feuillants.
- July 17: A demonstration sponsored by the Jacobins, Cordeliers and their allies carries a petition demanding the removal of the King to the Champ de Mars. The city government raises the red flag, the sign of martial law, and forbids the demonstration. The National Guard fires on the crowd, and some fifty persons are killed.
- July 18: Following the events in the Champ de Mars, the Assembly forbids incitement to riot, urging citizens to disobey the law, and seditious publications, aimed at the Jacobins and Cordeliers. Marat goes into hiding and Danton flees to England.
- August 14: Slave uprising begins in Saint Domingue (Haiti)
- August 27: Declaration of Pillnitz - A proclamation by Frederick William II of Prussia and Habsburg Holy Roman Emperor Leopold II, affirms their wish to "put the King of France in a state to strengthen the bases of monarchic government." This vague statement is taken in France as a direct threat by the other European powers to intervene in the Revolution.
- September 13–14: Louis XVI formally accepts the new Constitution.
- September 27: The Assembly declares that all men living in France, regardless of color, are free, but preserves slavery in French colonies. French Jews are granted citizenship.
- September 29: The Assembly limits membership in the National Guard to citizens who pay a certain level of taxes, thus excluding the working class.
- September 30: Last day of the National Constituent Assembly. Assembly grants amnesty to all those punished for illegal political activity since 1788.
- October 1: First session of the new national Legislative Assembly. Claude Pastoret, a monarchist, is elected President of the assembly.
- October 6: The first modern French Penal Code passes its vote in the convention.
- October 16: Riots against the revolutionary commune, or city government, in Avignon. After an official of the commune is killed, anti-government prisoners kept in the basements of the Papal Palace are massacred.
- November 9: Émigrés are again ordered to return to France before January 1, 1792, under penalty of losing their property and a sentence of death. King Louis XVI vetoes the declaration on November 11, but asks his brothers to return to France.
- November 14: Jérôme Pétion de Villeneuve is elected mayor of Paris, with 6,728 votes against 3,126 for Lafayette. Out of 80,000 eligible voters, 70,000 abstain.
- November 25: The Legislative Assembly creates a Committee of Surveillance to oversee the government.
- November 29: Priests are again ordered to take an oath to the government, or to be considered suspects.
- December 3: The King writes a secret letter to Frederick William II of Prussia, urging him to intervene militarily in France "to prevent the evil which is happening here before it overtakes the other states of Europe.
- December 3: Louis XVI's brothers, (the counts of Provence and Artois) refuse to return to France, citing "the moral and physical captivity in which the King is being held."
- December 14: Lafayette receives command of one of the three new armies established to defend the French borders, the Army of the Centre, based at Metz. The other two armies are commanded by Rochambeau (Army of the North) and Nicolas Luckner (Army of the Rhine).
- December 28: The Assembly votes to summon a mass army of volunteers to defend the borders of France.

== 1792 – War and the overthrow of the monarchy ==
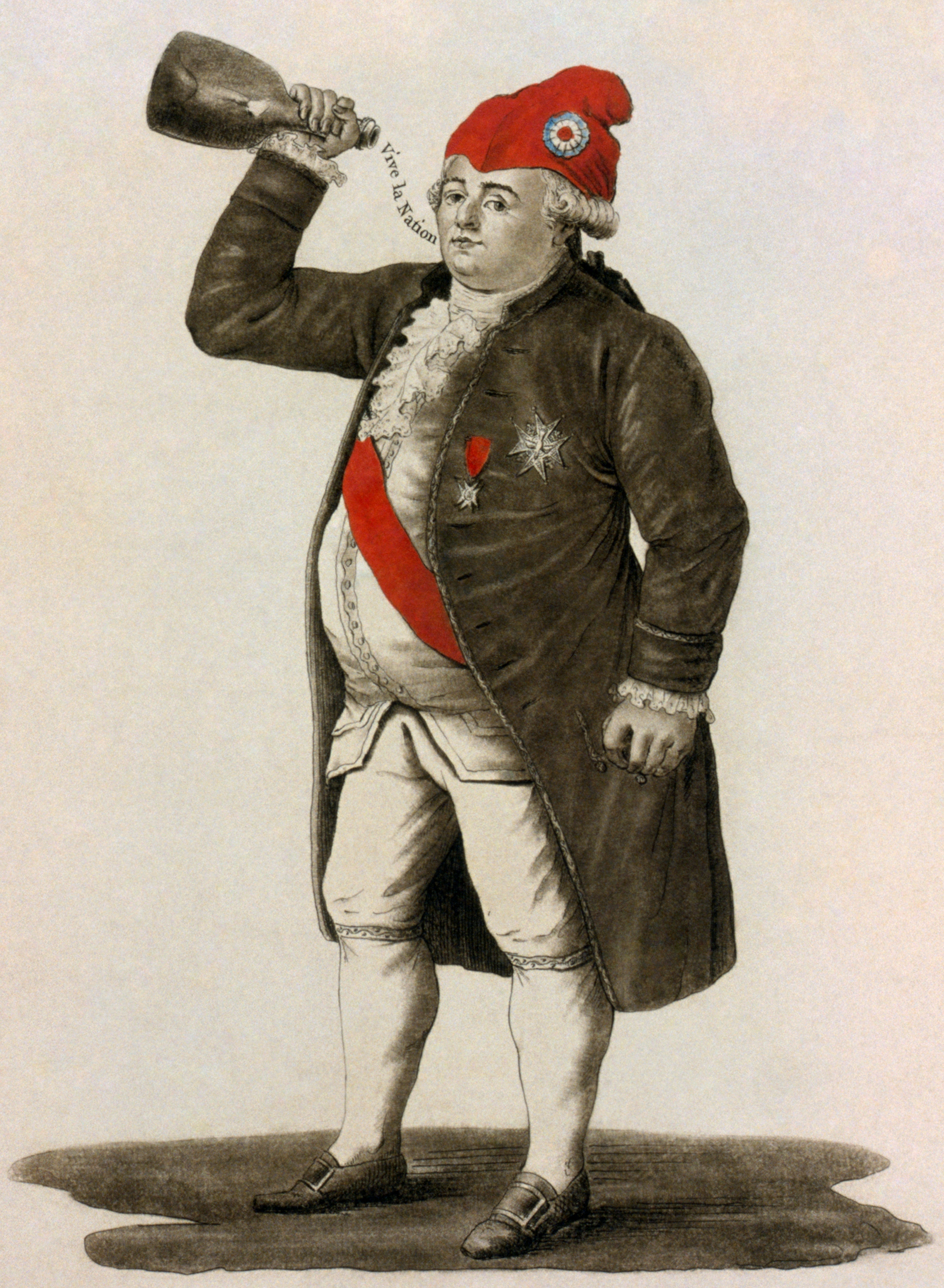
The king is forced to wear a Phrygian cap and drink a toast to the Nation (June 20, 1792)

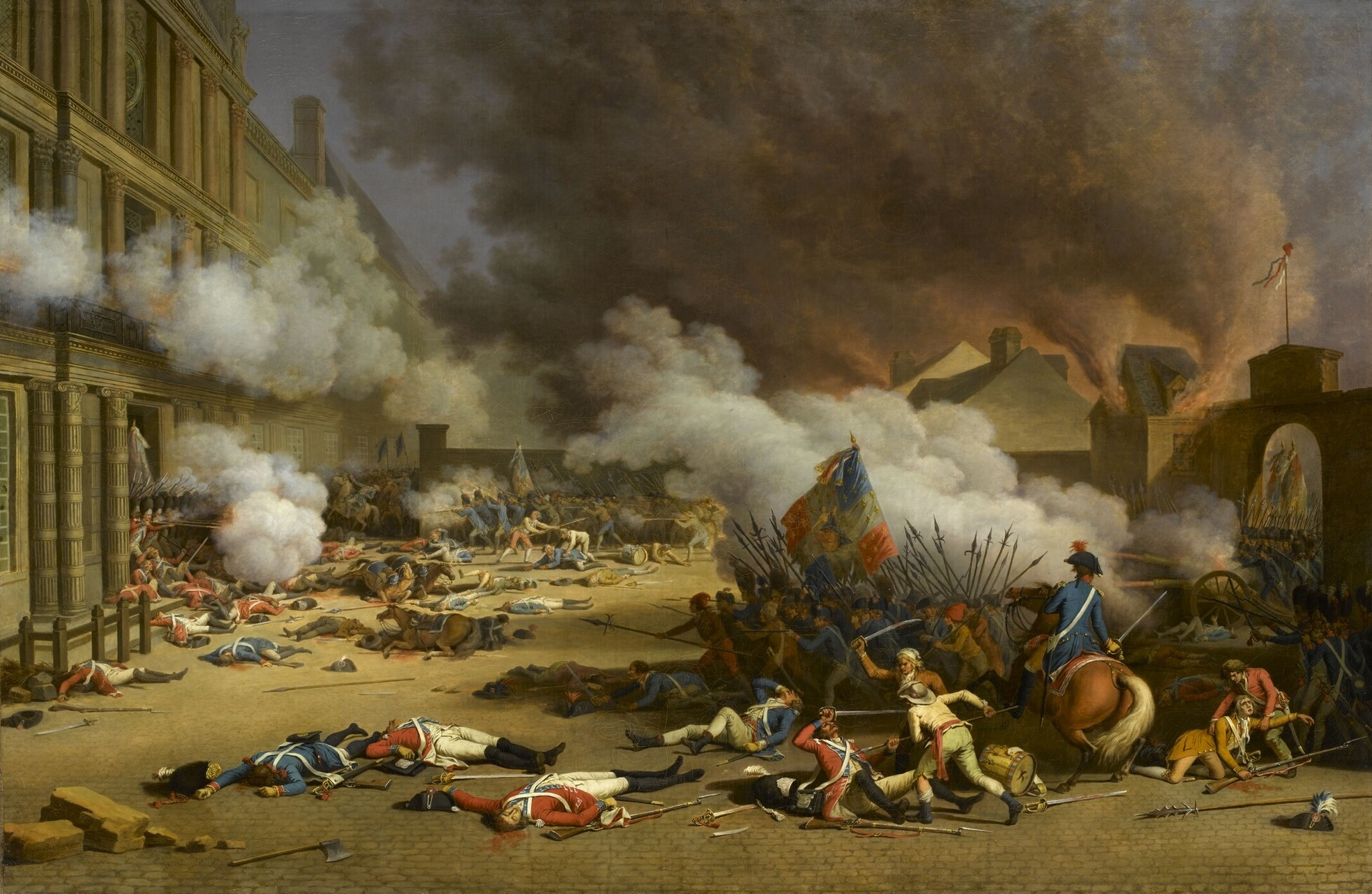
Sans-Culottes take possession of the Tuileries Palace and massacre the Swiss Guards (August 10, 1792)

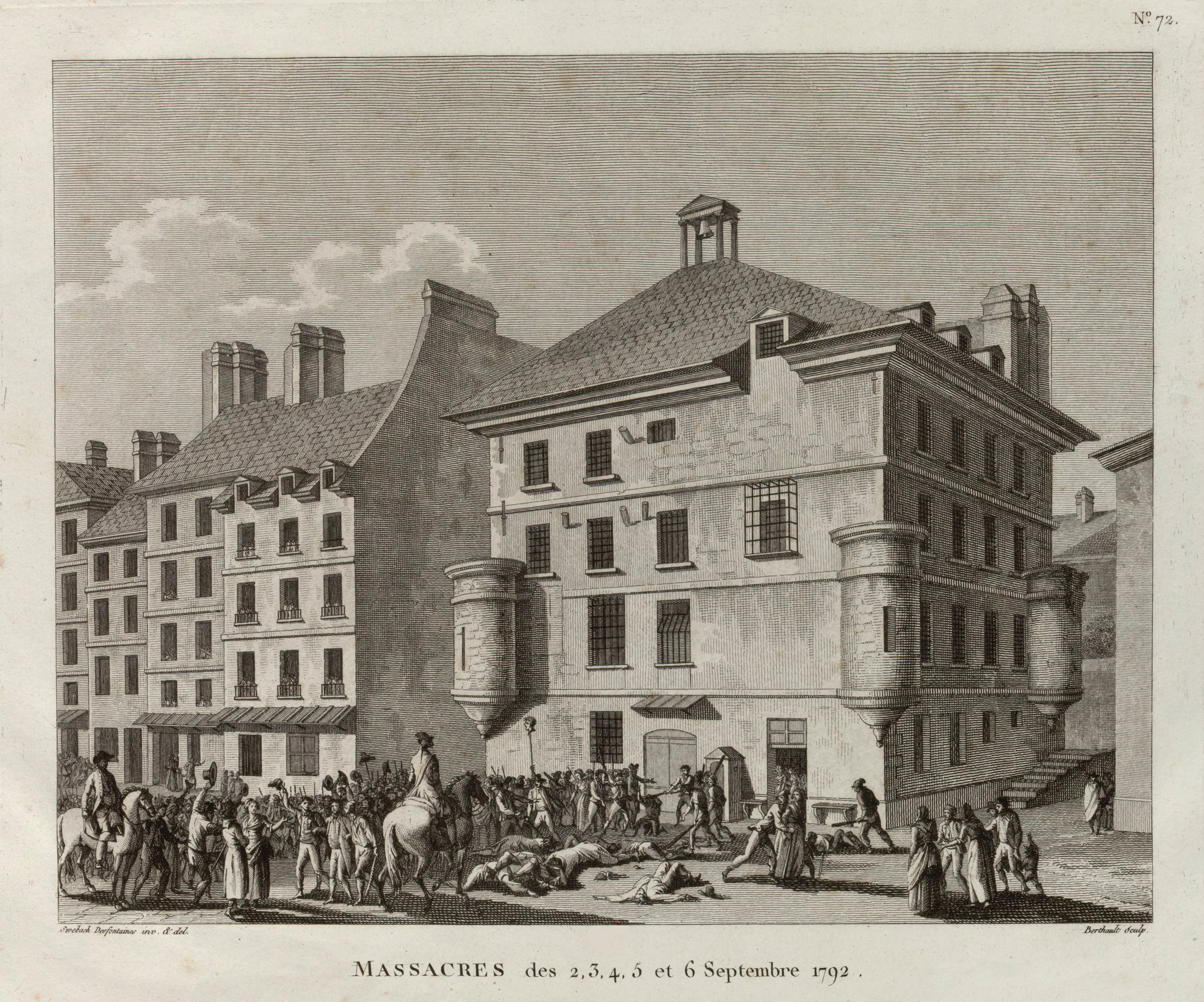
Massacre of prisoners in Paris prisons (September 2–7, 1792)

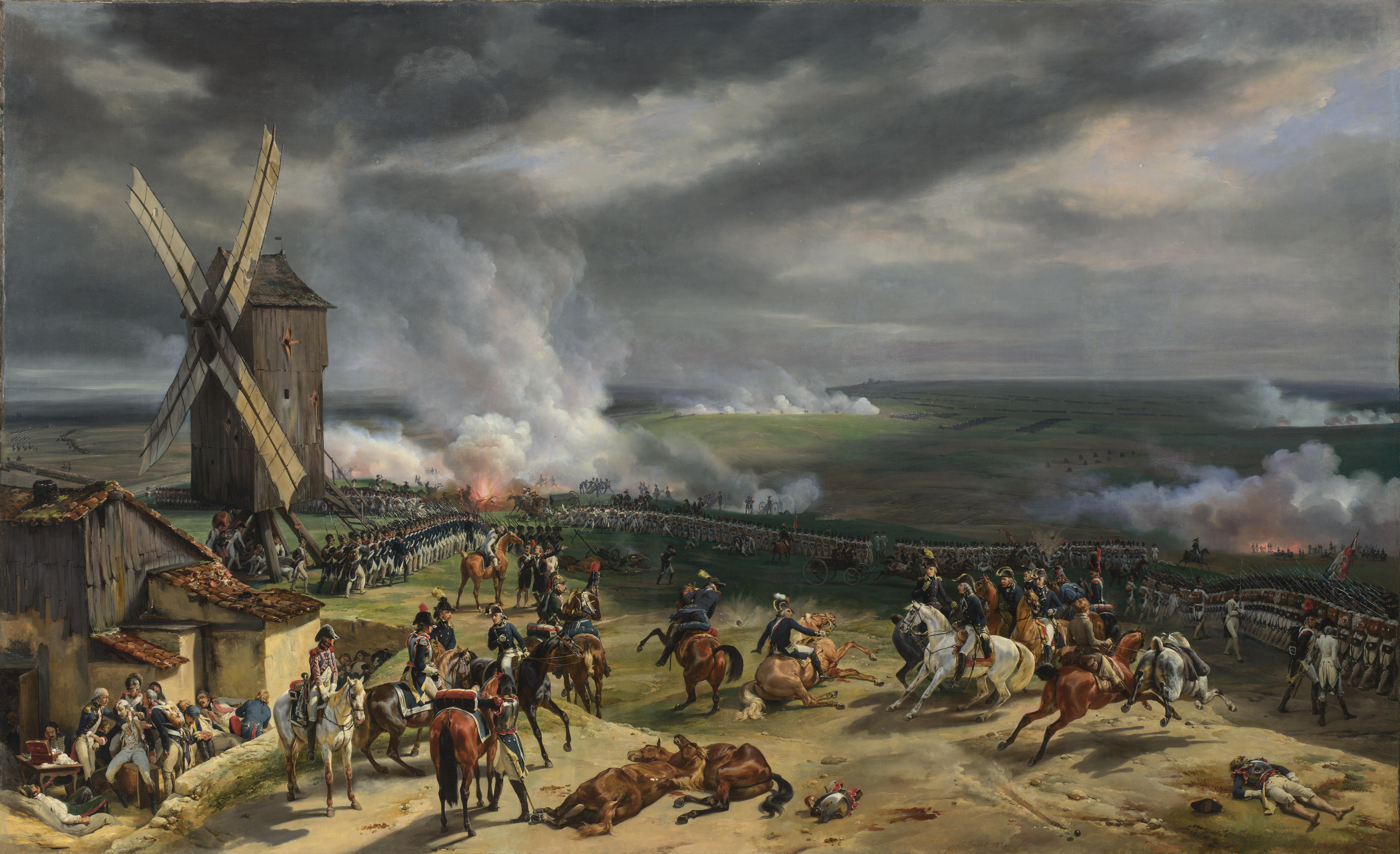
French victory over the Prussians at the Battle of Valmy (September 29, 1792)
- 23 January: The slave uprising in Haiti causes severe shortages of sugar and coffee in Paris. Riots against food shortages; many food shops are looted in Paris.
- February 1: French citizens are required to have a passport to travel in the interior of the country.
- February 7: Austria and Prussia sign in Berlin a military convention to invade France and defend the monarchy.
- February 9: The Assembly decrees the confiscation of the property of émigrés, for the benefit of the Nation.
- February 23: Confrontation between the army and crowds in Béthune over the allocation of grain.
- March 7: The Duke of Brunswick is named to command a joint Austrian-Prussian invasion of France.
- April 4: The Assembly grants equal rights to free people of color in Haiti.
- April 5: The Assembly closes the Sorbonne, a center of conservative theology.
- April 20: The Assembly declares war on the King of Bohemia and Hungary, i.e. to the Holy Roman Empire.
- April 25: La Marseillaise composed by Claude Joseph Rouget de Lisle, is sung for the first time in Strasbourg.
- April 28: The war begins. The army of Rochambeau invades the Austrian Netherlands.
- April 30: The government issues three hundred million assignats to finance the war.
- May 5: The Assembly orders the raising of thirty-one new battalions for the army.
- May 6: The Royal-Allemand regiment (Régiment de Royal-Allemand cavalerie), composed of German mercenaries, deserts the French army and joins the Austrian-Prussian coalition.
- May 12: The Hussar regiments of Saxe and Bercheny desert the French Army and join the coalition.
- May 27: The Assembly orders the deportation of priests who have not signed the oath to the government, known as the Civil Constitution of the Clergy.
- June 8: The Assembly orders the raising of an army of twenty thousand volunteers to be camped outside Paris.
- June 11: Louis XVI vetoes the laws on the deportation of priests and the formation of a new army outside Paris.
- June 13 Louis XVI dismisses his Girondin ministers following a letter penned by Jean Marie de Roland, Minister of the Interior criticising the King's veto of Girondin legislation on June 11.
- June 20: A secret insurrectionary committee, supported by the Paris Commune and led by the prosecutors Louis Pierre Manuel and Georges Danton, is formed.
- June 20: Demonstrators invade the Tuileries Palace and King Louis XVI condescends to wear a red liberty cap and drink to the health of the Nation.
- June 21: The Assembly bans gatherings of armed citizens within the city limits.
- June 28: Lafayette speaks to the Assembly, denouncing the actions of the Jacobins and other radical groups in the Assembly. His proposal to organize a review of the National guard in Paris is annulled by Pétion, mayor of Paris.
- June 30: Lafayette leaves Paris and returns to his army. He is denounced by Robespierre and his effigy is burned by a mob at the Palais-Royal.
- July 11: As the Austrian army advances slowly toward Paris, the Assembly declares that the Nation is in danger (La patrie en danger).
- July 15: The Assembly votes to send regular army units, whose officers largely support Lafayette, far outside the city.
- July 15: Members of the Cordeliers club, led by Danton, demand the convocation of a Convention to replace the Legislative Assembly.
- July 25: The Assembly authorizes the Paris sections, local assemblies in each neighborhood, many controlled by the Jacobins and Cordeliers, to meet in permanent sessions.
- July 25: Brunswick Manifesto - The Austrian commander warns that should the royal family be harmed, an "exemplary and eternally memorable revenge" will follow.
- July 28: The Brunswick Manifesto is widely circulated in Paris, causing fury against the King.
- July 30: Decree by the Assembly allows working-class citizens (those who pay no taxes) to join the National Guard.
- July 30: Arrival in Paris of volunteer fédérés from Marseille. They sing the new war hymn, of the Army of the Rhine, which gradually takes their name, La Marseillaise. Fights break out between the new volunteers and soldiers of the National Guard loyal to Lafayette.
- August 3: 47 of the 48 sections of Paris, mostly controlled by the Cordeliers and the Jacobins, send petitions to the Assembly, demanding the removal of the King. They are presented by Pétion, the mayor of Paris.
- August 4: The Paris section Number Eighty proclaims an insurrection on August 10 if the Assembly does not remove the King. At the request of the royal household, the Swiss guards at the Tuileries are reinforced, and joined by many armed nobles.
- August 9: Georges Danton, a deputy city prosecutor, and his Cordeliers allies take over the Paris city government and establish the Revolutionary Paris commune. They take possession of the Hôtel de Ville. They increase the number of Commune deputies to 288. The Assembly recognizes them as the legal government of Paris on August 10.

=== August 10, 1792 – Storming of the Tuileries; Downfall of the King ===
- August 10: Storming of the Tuileries Palace. The National Guard of the insurrectional Paris Commune and revolutionary fédérés from Marseille and Brittany attack the Tuileries Palace. The King and his family take refuge in the Legislative Assembly. The Swiss Guards defending the Palace are massacred. The Legislative Assembly provisionally suspends the authority of the King, and orders the election of a new government, the Convention.
- August 11: The Assembly elects a new Executive Committee to replace the government. Danton is named Minister of Justice. The municipalities are authorized to arrest suspected enemies of the Revolution, and royalist newspapers and publications are banned.
- August 13: Royal family imprisoned in the Temple.
- August 14: Lafayette tries unsuccessfully to persuade his army to march on Paris to rescue the royal family.
- August 17: At the demand of Robespierre and the Commune of Paris, who threatens an armed uprising if the Assembly does not comply, the Assembly votes the creation of a new Criminal Tribunal (not to be confused with the later Revolutionary Tribunal) to deal with the crimes committed on the 10th of August, the members of which are selected by the Commune.
- August 18: The Assembly abolishes the religious teaching orders and those running hospitals, the last remaining religious orders in France.
- August 19: Lafayette leaves his army and goes into exile. The Coalition army of Austrian and Prussian soldiers, and of French émigrés, led by the Duke of Brunswick crosses the northern and eastern borders into France.
- August 21: First summary judgement by the Revolutionary Tribunal and execution by the guillotine of a royalist, Louis Collenot d'Angremont (fr).
- August 22: The Paris Commune orders that persons henceforth be addressed as Citoyen and Citoyenne ("Citizen") rather than Monsieur or Madame.
- August 22: Royalist riots in Brittany, Vendée and Dauphiné.
- September 2: Capitulation without a fight of Verdun to Brunswick's troops.

=== September 2–7, 1792 – Massacres in Paris prisons ===
- September 2–7: Following the news of surrender of Verdun, the Commune orders massacres of prisoners in Paris prisons. Between 1400 and 2000 prisoners are massacred, the great majority were common criminals, 17 percent were priests, 6 percent Swiss guards, and 5 percent political prisoners.
- September 10: The government requisitions all church objects made of gold or silver.
- September 19: Creation of the Louvre Museum displaying art taken from royal collections.
- September 20: Last session of Assembly votes a new law permitting civil marriage and divorce.

=== September 20, 1792 – French victory at Valmy; Debut of the Convention ===
- September 20: The French army under Generals Dumouriez and Kellermann defeat the Prussians at the Battle of Valmy. The Prussians retreat.
- September 20: The newly elected National Convention holds its first session behind closed doors, in the Salle du Manège, the former riding school of the Tuileries Palace, and elects its Bureau. Of the 749 deputies, 113 are Jacobins, who take their seats in the highest benches in the hall, the Montagne (Mountain), thus their nickname of Montagnards, the "Mountaineers".
- September 22: The Convention proclaims the abolition of royalty and the French First Republic.
- September 29: French troops occupy Nice, then part of Savoy.
- October 3: French troops occupy Basel in Switzerland, then ruled by Archbishop of Basel, and proclaim it an independent Republic.
- October 23: French troops occupy Frankfurt am Main.
- October 27: The French army under Dumouriez invades the Austrian Netherlands (Belgium). They occupy Brussels on November 14.
- November 19: The Convention claims the right to intervene in any country "where people desire to recover their freedom".
- November 20: Discovery in the king's apartment in the Tuileries Palace of the armoire de fer, an iron strongbox containing Louis XVI's secret correspondence with Mirabeau and with foreign monarchs.
- November 27: The Convention decrees the attachment of Nice and the Savoy to France.
- November 28: The French army occupies Liège.
- December 3: Robespierre, leader of the Jacobins and First Deputy for Paris in the convention, demands that the King be put to death.
- December 4: Deputies sent by Brussels assembly to the National Convention express gratitude of the Belgian people and request that France officially recognise the independence of Belgium. The Convention adopts immediately the proposed decree.
- December 6: At the proposal of Jean-Paul Marat, the Convention rules that each deputy must individually and publicly declare his vote on the death penalty for the King.

== December 10, 1792 – January 21, 1793 – Trial and Execution of Louis XVI ==
- December 10: Opening of the trial of Louis XVI before the convention.
- December 11: Louis XVI is brought before the convention. He appears in person twice, December 11 and 26.
- December 26: Defense of the King presented by his lawyer, Raymond Desèze (Raymond comte de Sèze).
- December 27–28: Motions in the Convention asking that people vote on judgement of the King. The motion is opposed by Robespierre, who declares "Louis must die so that the nation may live." The Convention rejects the motion for French voters to decide the King's fate.
- January 15: The Convention declares Louis XVI guilty of conspiracy against public liberty by a vote of 707 to zero.
- January 17: In a vote lasting twenty-one hours, 361 deputies vote for the death penalty, and 360 against (including 26 for a death penalty followed by a pardon). The Convention rejects a final appeal to the people.
- January 21: Louis XVI is beheaded at 10:22 on Place de la Révolution. The commander of the execution, Antoine Joseph Santerre, orders a drum roll to drown out his final words to the crowd.
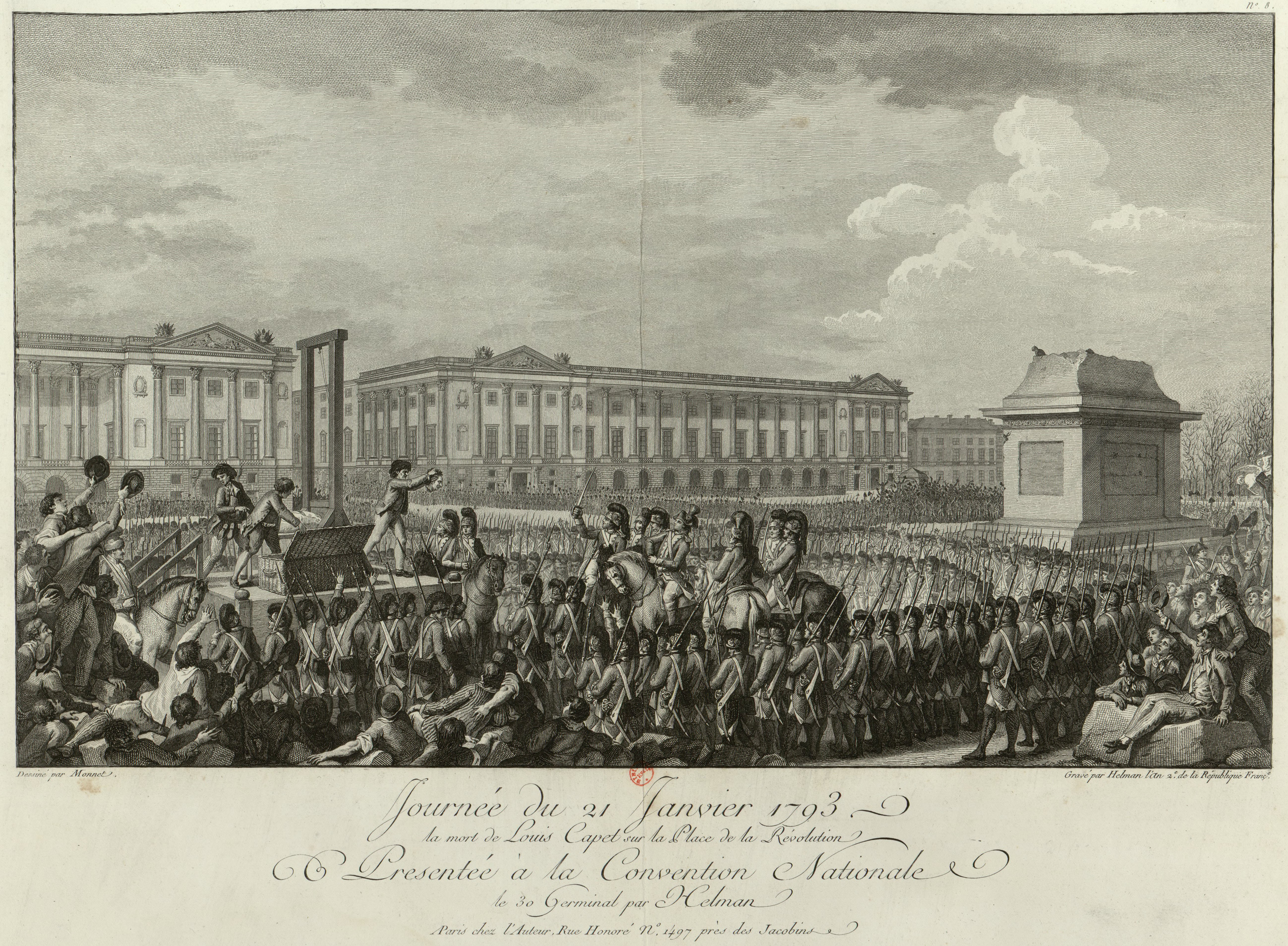
The execution of Louis XVI (January 21, 1793)

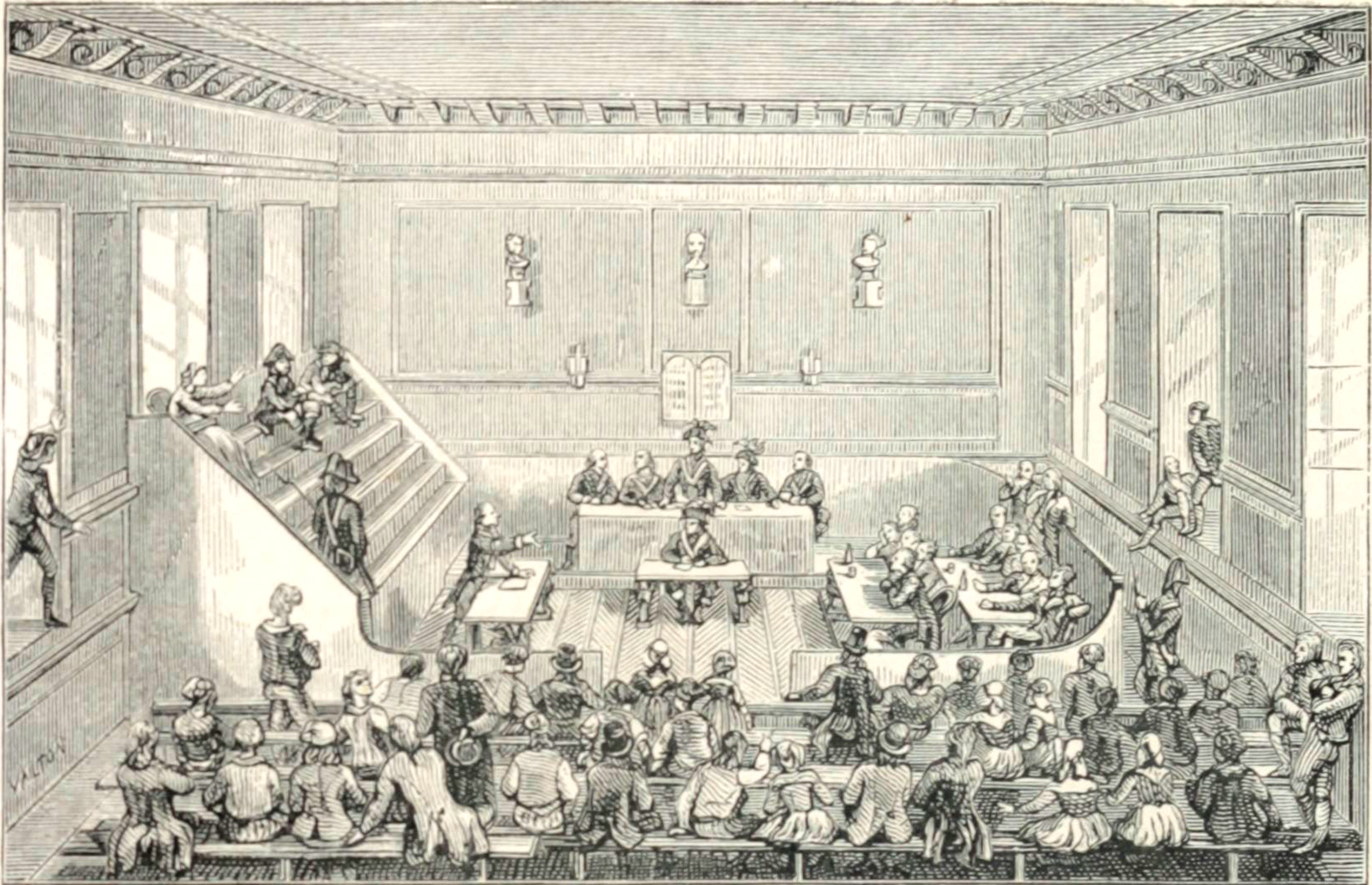
The Revolutionary Tribunal at work in 1793

== 1793 – France at war against Europe; The Jacobins seize power; The Terror begins ==
- January 24: Breaking of diplomatic relations between England and France.
- February 1: The Convention declares war against England and the Dutch Republic.
- February 14: The Convention annexes the Principality of Monaco.
- February 14: Jean Nicolas Pache is elected the new mayor of Paris.
- March 1: Decree of the Convention annexes Belgium to France.
- March 3: Armed royalist uprising against the Convention begins in Brittany.
- March 7: The Convention declares war against Spain.

=== Uprising in the Vendée ===
- March 7: War in the Vendée. Armed uprising against the rule of the convention, particularly against conscription into the army, begins in the Vendée region of west-central France.
- March 10: Revolutionary Tribunal established in Paris, with Fouquier-Tinville as the public prosecutor.
- March 10: Failed uprising in Paris by the ultra-revolutionary faction known as the enragés, led by the former priest Jacques Roux.
- March 18: The Convention decrees the death penalty for those advocating radical economic programs, a decree aimed at the enragés.
- March 19: The Convention decrees the death penalty for any participant in the uprising in the Vendée.
- March 21: Establishment of Revolutionary Surveillance Committees (Comités de surveillance révolutionnaire) in all communes and their sections.
- March 27: General Dumouriez denounces revolutionary anarchy.
- March 30: The Convention orders Dumouriez to return to Paris, and sends four commissaires and Pierre de Ruel, the Minister of War, to arrest him.
- April 1: Dumouriez arrests the commissaires of the Convention and Minister of War and hands them over to the Austrians,
- April 3: Convention declares Dumouriez outside the law.
- April 3: Arrest of Philippe Égalité, a deputy and head of the Orléans branch of the royal family, who had voted for the execution of Louis XVI, his cousin.
- April 4: Dumouriez fails to persuade his army to march on Paris, and goes over to the Austrians on April 5.
- April 5: Jean Paul Marat is elected head of the Jacobin Club.

=== April 6 – May 30, 1793 - Committee on Public Safety takes control of government ===
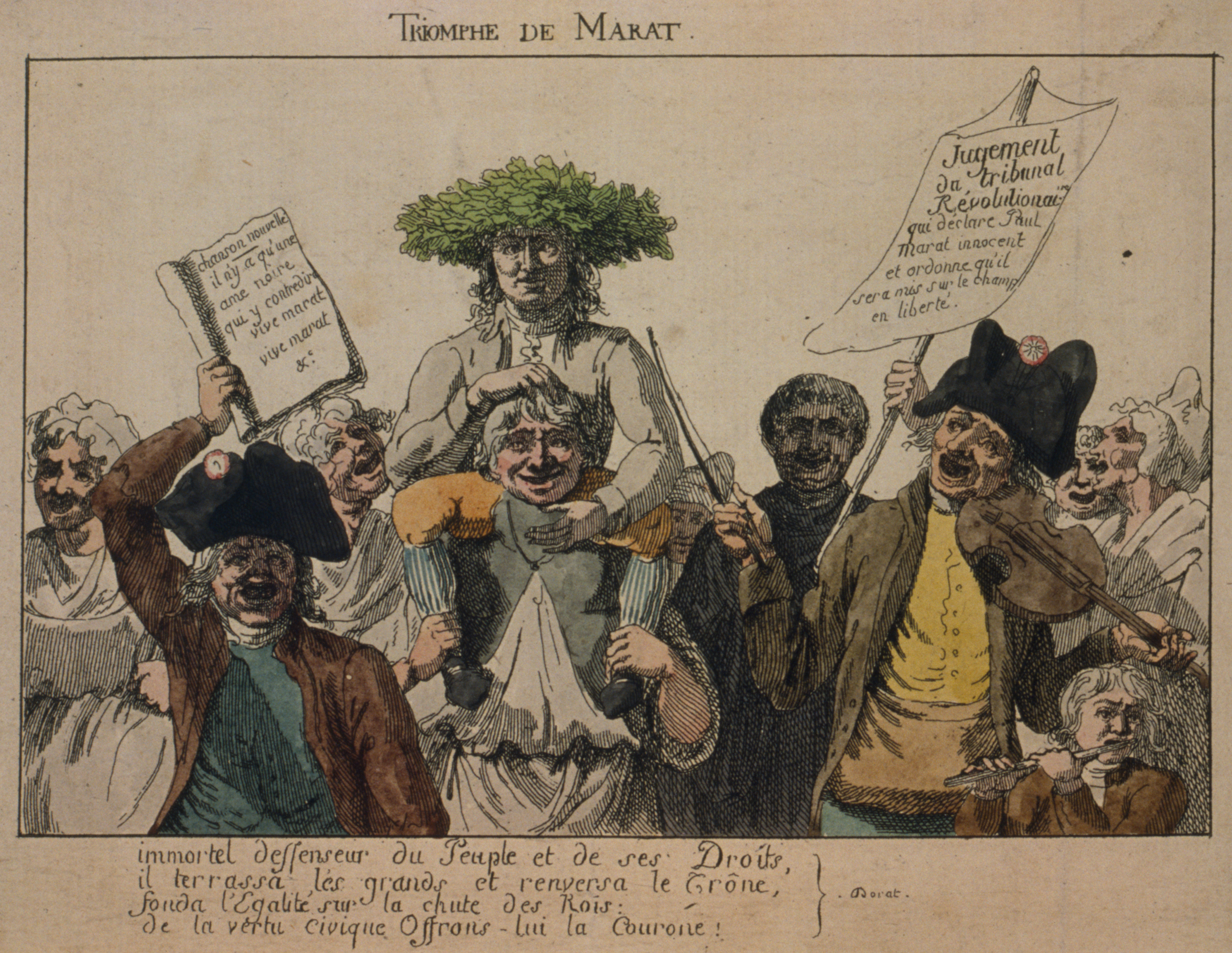
The triumph of Marat after his release from arrest

- April 6: Committee of Public Safety established by the convention to oversee the ministries and to be chief executive body of the government. Its first nine members included Bertrand Barère, Pierre Joseph Cambon and Georges Danton.
- April 6: First session of the Revolutionary Tribunal.
- April 12: The Convention votes to arrest Marat for using his newspaper L'Ami du peuple to incite violence and murder, and demand to suspend the convention. Marat goes into hiding.
- April 15: The mayor of Paris, Jean Nicolas Pache, demands that the Convention expel 23 deputies belonging to the moderate Girondin faction.
- April 24: Marat is brought before the Revolutionary Tribunal, and is acquitted of all charges. His release causes riotous celebrations by his supporters.
- May 3: The rebels of the Vendée, led by the aristocrats Charles de Bonchamps and Henri de la Rochejaquelein, capture Bressuire.
- May 4: At the demand of the Paris section of Saint-Antoine, the Convention fixes a maximum price for grain.
- May 24: At the demand of the Girondins, the Convention orders the arrest of the ultra-revolutionary enragés leaders Jacques René Hébert and Jean Varlet.
- May 25: The Paris Commune demands the release of Hébert and Varlet.
- May 26: At the Jacobin Club, Robespierre and Marat call for an insurrection against the convention. The Paris Commune begins preparing a seizure of power.
- May 27: Release of Hébert and Varlet.
- May 30: The leaders of Lyon rebel against the convention, arresting the local Montagnard and enragés leaders.

=== May 31 – June 2, 1793 – The Montagnard Coup d'État ===
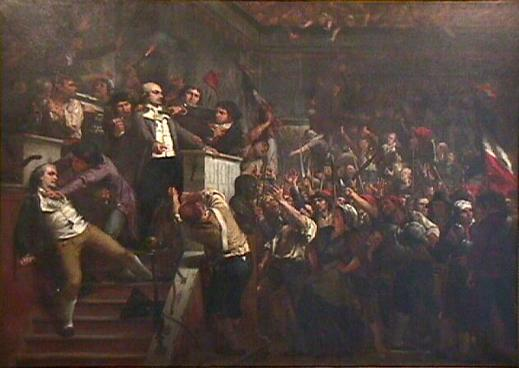
Sans-culottes threaten deputy Lanjuinais, on the podium during the takeover of the convention (June 2, 1793)

- May 31: Insurrection of 31 May – 2 June 1793. An armed crowd of sans-culottes organized by the Commune storms the hall of the convention and demands that it disband. The deputies resist.
- June 2: The sans-culottes and soldiers of the Paris Commune, led by François Hanriot, occupy the hall of the convention and force it to vote for the arrest of 29 Girondins deputies, and two ministers, Claviére and Lebrun.
- June 6: Revolts against the Montagnard coup d'état in Marseille, Nîmes, and Toulouse.
- June 7: Bordeaux rejects the new government.
- June 10: Montagnards gain control of the Committee of Public Safety.
- June 10: Despite the Revolution, scientific research continues. Opening of the National Museum of Natural History.
- June 13: Leaders of departments opposing the new government meet in Caen. About sixty departments are in revolt against Montagnard government in Paris.
- June 24: Ratification of new Constitution by the National Convention.
- June 25: Jacques Roux, leader of the ultra-revolutionary enragés, presents his program to the convention.
- June 26; Robespierre denounces the enragés before the convention.
- June 30: Robespierre and Hébert lead a delegation of Jacobins to the Cordeliers Club to demand the exclusion from the club of Roux and the other ultra-revolutionary leaders.
- July 3: The eight-year-old Louis XVII, king of France in the eyes of the royalists, is taken from Marie Antoinette and given to a cobbler named Antoine Simon on orders from the National Convention.
- July 4: Marat violently denounces the enragés.

=== July 13, 1793 – Assassination of Jean-Paul Marat by Charlotte Corday ===
- July 13: Charlotte Corday assassinates Jean-Paul Marat in his bath. At her trial, she declares, "I killed one man to save a hundred thousand."
- July 17: Charlotte Corday is tried and sentenced to death by the Revolutionary Tribunal for murdering Marat. She is guillotined after her trial.
- July 27: Robespierre elected to the Committee of Public Safety.
- July 27: The Convention institutes death penalty for those who hoard scarce goods.
- August 1: The Convention declares a scorched earth policy against all departments rebelling against its authority.
- August 1: The Convention adopts the principles of the metric system.
- August 1: On order by decree of the convention, a mob profanes the tombs of the Kings of France at the Basilica of Saint-Denis.
- August 2: Marie-Antoinette is transferred from the Temple to the Conciergerie.
- August 8: The Convention sends an army led by General Kellermann to lay siege to the rebellious city of Lyon.
- August 22: Robespierre is elected the president of the convention.
- August 23: Levée en masse voted by the convention. All able-bodied non-married men between ages 18 and 25 are required to serve in the army.
- August 25: Soldiers of the Convention capture Marseille.
- August 27: Anti-Convention leaders in Toulon invite the First Coalition to occupy the city.
- September 4: Sans-culottes occupy the convention and demand the arrest of suspected opponents of the Revolution, and the creation of a new revolutionary army of 60,000 men.

=== September 17, 1793 – The Reign of Terror begins ===
- September 17: Convention adopts a new Law of Suspects, permitting the arrest and rapid trial of anyone suspected of opposing the Revolution. Start of Reign of Terror.
- September 18: Convention re-establishes revolutionary government in Bordeaux. Opponents are arrested and imprisoned.
- September 21: All women are required to wear a cocarde tricolor.
- September 29: The Convention passes the general maximum, fixing the prices of many goods and services, as well as maximum salaries.
- October 3: The Convention orders that Marie-Antoinette be tried by the Revolutionary Tribunal.
- October 3: Additional moderate deputies are accused and excluded from the Assembly; a total of 136 deputies are excluded.
- October 5: To break with the past and replace traditional religious holidays, the Convention adopts the newly created Republican Calendar: Year I is declared to have begun on September 22, 1792.
- October 9: Lyon is recaptured by the army of the convention.
- October 10: A decree by the Convention puts the new Constitution on hold. On a proposal from Saint-Just, the Convention declares that "The government of France is revolutionary until the peace."
- October 12: The Convention decrees that the city of Lyon will be destroyed in punishment for its rebellion, and renamed Ville-Affranchie.
- October 12: Marie-Antoinette is summoned before the Revolutionary Tribunal and charged with treason.
- October 16: The Army of the Convention defeats the Austrian Army at the Battle of Wattignies.

=== October 16, 1793 – The execution of Marie-Antoinette ===
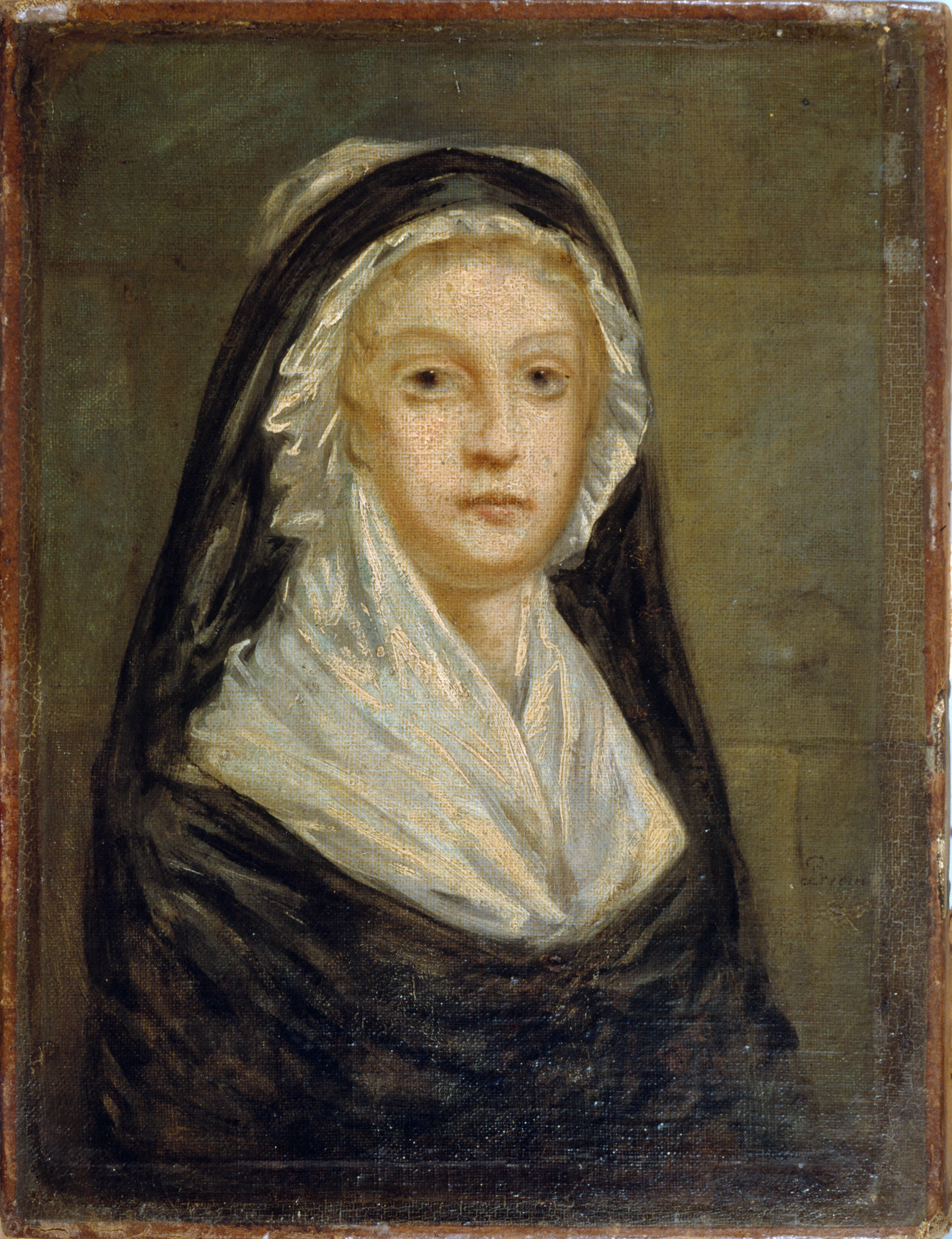
Marie-Antoinette in the Temple Prison (1793)

- October 16: Marie-Antoinette is convicted and guillotined on the Place de la Revolution.
- October 17: The Army of the Convention under Generals Jean-Baptiste Kléber and François Séverin Marceau-Desgraviers defeats the Vendéen rebels at Cholet.
- October 20: The Convention orders the repression of the ultra-revolutionary enragés.
- October 28: The Convention forbids religious instruction by clerics.
- October 30: The Revolutionary Tribunal sentences the 21 Girondins deputies to death.
- October 31: The 21 Girondins deputies are guillotined.
- November 3: Olympe de Gouges, champion of rights for women, accused of Girondin sympathies, is guillotined.
- November 7: Philippe Égalité is guillotined.
- November 8: Madame Roland is guillotined in the purge of Girondins. Before her execution, she cries: "Liberty, what crimes are committed in your name!"
- November 9: Former finance minister Brienne is arrested at Sens.
- November 10: The Cathedral of Notre Dame is re-dedicated as a Temple of Reason in to the civic religion of the Cult of Reason.
- November 12: The astronomer and former mayor of Paris, Jean Sylvain Bailly, is executed on the Champ de Mars for his role in suppressing a demonstration there on July 17, 1791.
- November 17: On Robespierre's orders, supporters of Danton are arrested.
- November 20: Danton returns to Paris, after being absent since October 11. He urges "indulgence" toward opponents and "national reconciliation".
- November 23: The Paris Commune orders the closing of all churches and places of worship in Paris.
- November 25: Convention votes to remove Mirabeau's remains from the Panthéon and replace them with those of Marat.
- December 5: The Cordelier deputy Camille Desmoulins, supporting Danton, publishes an appeal for national reconciliation.
- December 12: Defeat of the rebel Vendéen army at Le Mans.
- December 19: Withdrawal of the First Coalition from Toulon, following a successful military operation conceived and led by a young artillery officer, Napoleon Bonaparte.
- December 23: The Army of General François Joseph Westermann destroys the last the Vendéen army at Savenay. Six thousand prisoners are executed.
- December 24: To punish the rebellious city of Toulon, the Convention renames it Port-la-Montagne.

== 1794 – The fury of the Terror, the Cult of the Supreme Being, and the Downfall of Robespierre ==
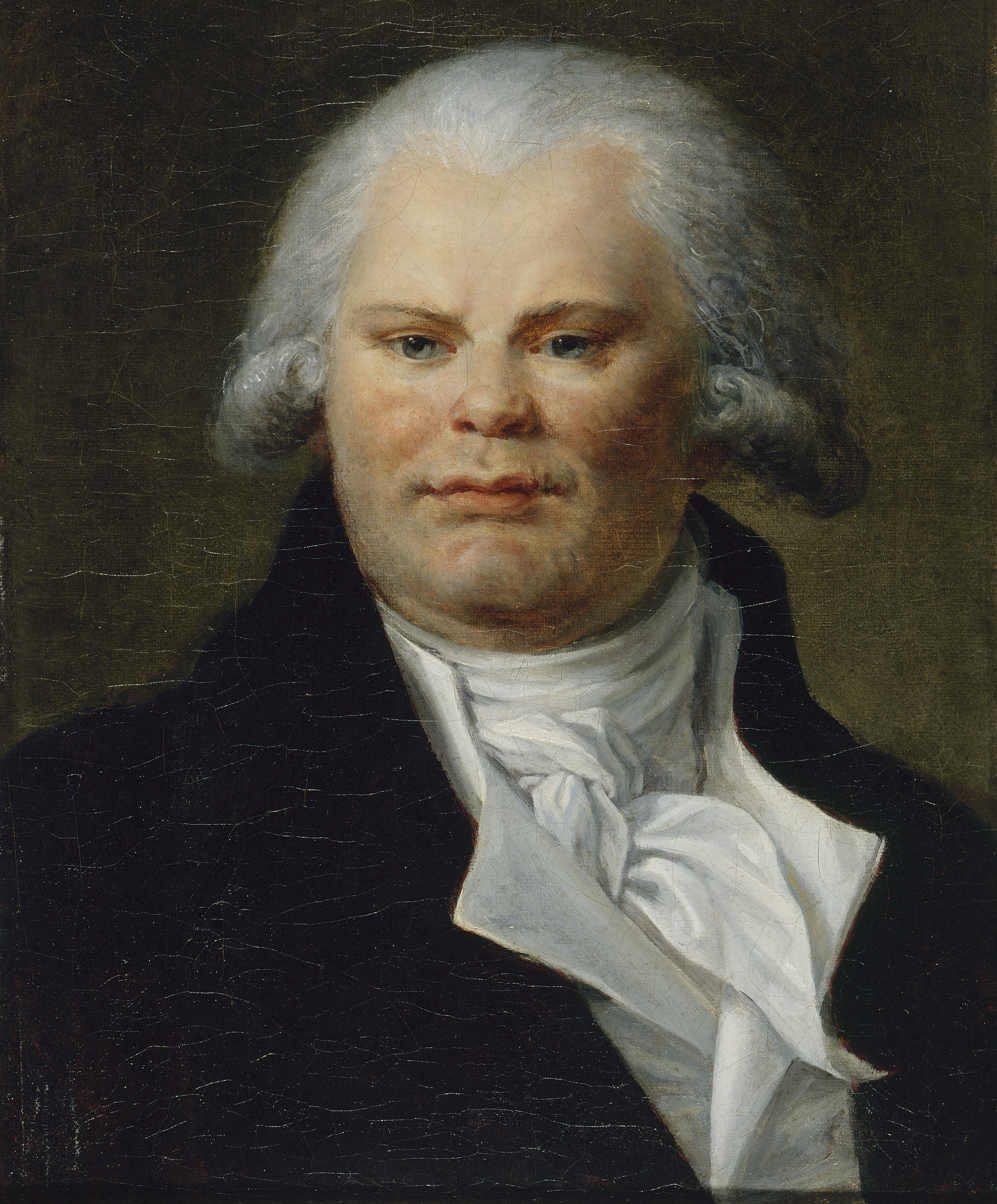
Georges Danton

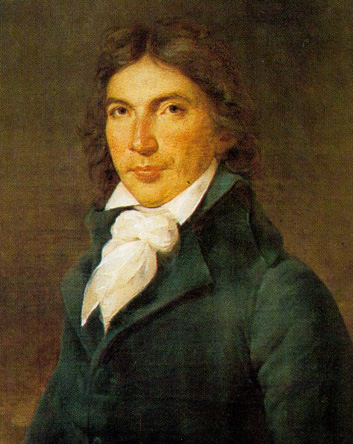
Camille Desmoulins

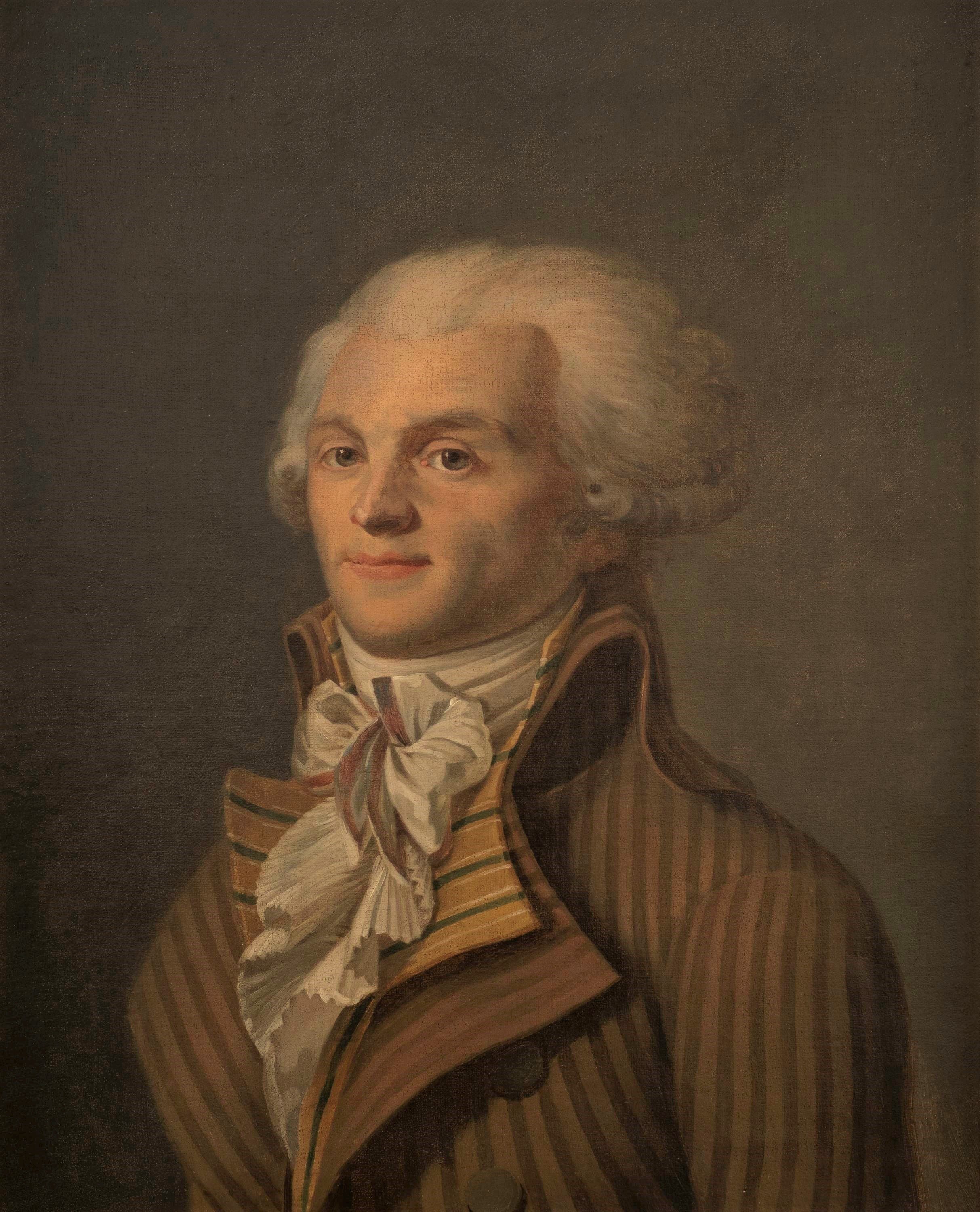
Maximilien Robespierre

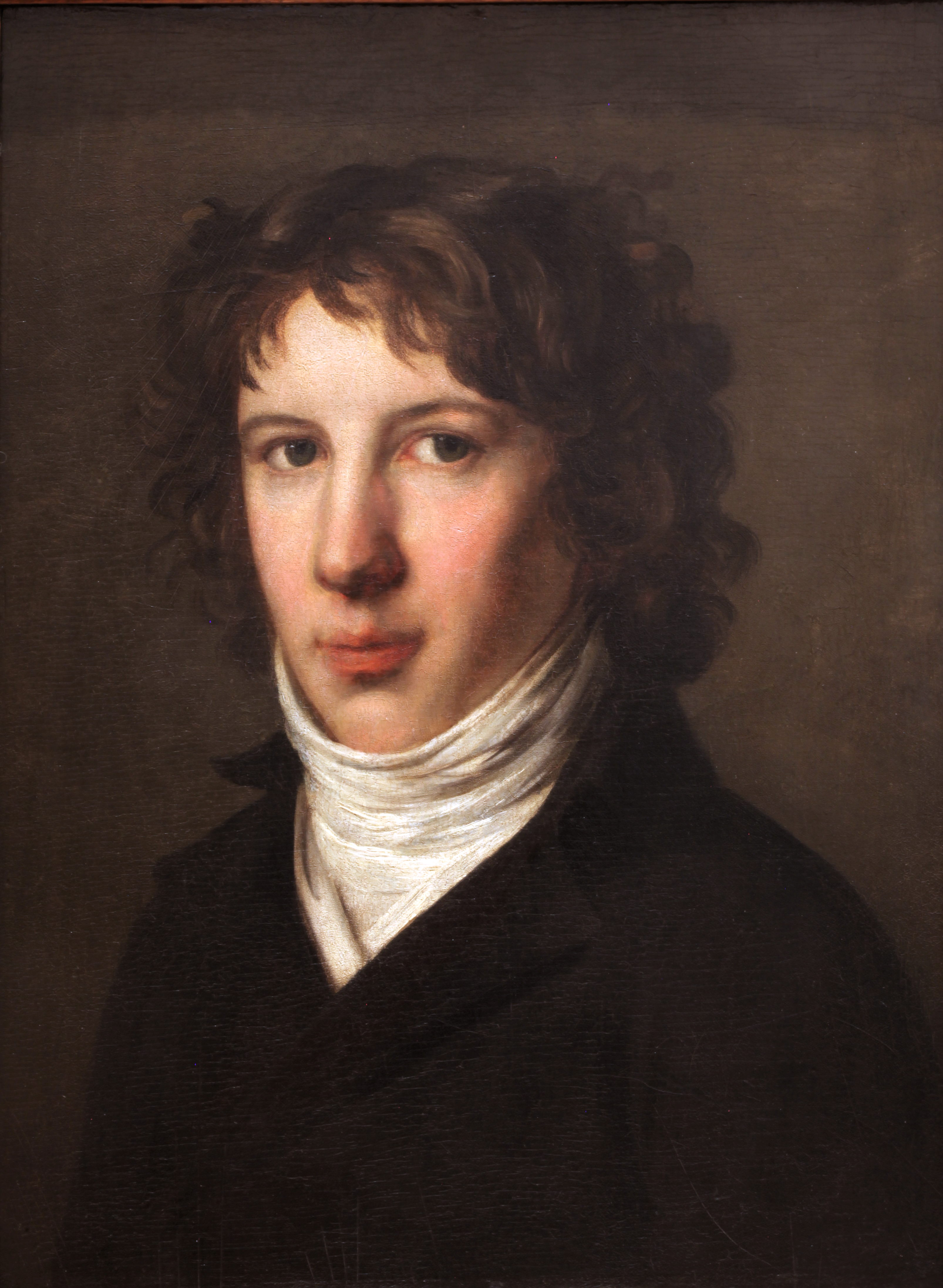
Louis de Saint-Just

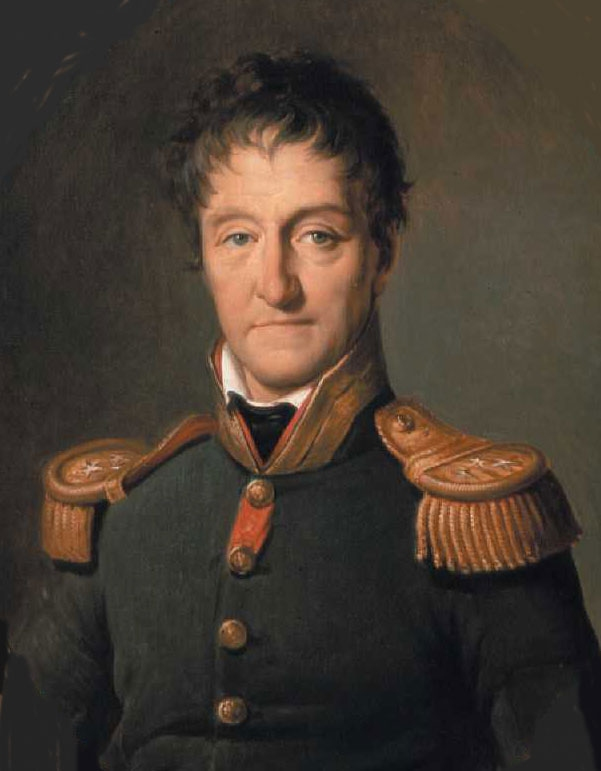
Lazare Carnot
- January 8: At the Jacobins, Robespierre denounces Fabre d'Églantine, one of the instigators of the September massacres, father of the Republican calendar, and ally of Danton.
- January 13: Arrest of Fabre d'Églantine for alleged diversion of state funds.
- January 29: Death of Henri de la Rochejaquelein, royalist and military leader of the Vendéens, fighting at Nuaillé.
- February 4: The Convention votes to abolish slavery in French colonies.
- February 5: Robespierre lectures the convention on the necessity for the Terror: "The foundations of a popular government in a revolution are virtue and terror; terror without virtue is disastrous; and virtue without terror is powerless. The Government of the Revolution is the despotism of liberty over tyranny."
- February 6: Napoleon Bonaparte is promoted to general for his role in driving the Coalition from Toulon.
- February 6: Recall of Jean-Baptiste Carrier from Nantes. As official delegate of the convention, he was responsible for the drownings at Nantes of as many as ten thousand Vendéen prisoners, in barges deliberately sunk in the Loire River.
- February 10: Jacques Roux commits suicide in prison.
- February 22: In a speech at the Cordeliers Club, Hébert attacks both the factions of Danton and Robespierre.
- March 4: At the Cordeliers Club, Jean-Baptiste Carrier calls for an insurrection against the convention.
- March 11: The Committees of Public Safety and General Security denounce a planned uprising by the Cordeliers.
- March 13: Saint-Just, President of the convention, denounces a plot against liberty and the French people. Hébert and many other Cordeliers are arrested.
- March 15: Robespierre tells the Convention that "All the factions must perish from the same blow."
- March 20: Arrest of General Hoche, a member of the Cordeliers. He is freed in August after the fall of Robespierre.
- March 21: Trial of the Hébertists begins. To compromise them, they are tried together with foreign bankers, aristocrats and counter-revolutionaries.
- March 24: Hébert and leaders of the Cordeliers are condemned to death and guillotined.
- March 27: The philosopher and mathematician Condorcet is arrested. He is found dead in his cell two days later.

=== March 30, 1794 – The arrest and trial of Danton and Desmoulins ===
- March 30: Danton, Camille Desmoulins and their supporters arrested.
- April 2: Trial of Danton before the Revolutionary Tribunal. He uses the occasion to ridicule and insult his opponents.
- April 4: The Convention decrees that anyone who insults the justice system is excluded from speaking, barring Danton from defending himself.
- April 5: Danton and Desmoulins are convicted and guillotined the same day.
- April 8: Robespierre makes accusations against the Convention delegate Joseph Fouché at a meeting of the Jacobins.
- April 10: The members of the alleged Conspiracy of Luxembourg, a diverse collection of followers of Danton and Hébert and other individuals, are put on trial. Seven are acquitted and nineteen are condemned and executed, including Lucile Desmoulins, the widow of Camille Desmoulins, General Arthur Dillon, who had fought in the American Revolutionary War, Pierre Gaspard Chaumette, Françoise Hébert, the widow of Jacques Hébert, and the defrocked Bishop Gobel.
- April 14: At the request of Robespierre, the Convention orders the transfer of the ashes of Jean-Jacques Rousseau to the Panthéon.
- April 15: A report to the convention by Saint-Just calls from greater centralization of the police under the control of the Committee for Public Safety.
- April 19: By the Treaty of the Hague, between Britain and Prussia, Britain agrees to fund an army of 62,000 Prussian soldiers to continue the war against France.
- April 20: In a report to the convention, the deputy Billaud-Varenne delivers a veiled attack against Robespierre: "All people jealous of their liberty should be on guard even against the virtues of those who occupy eminent positions."
- On 22 April: Malesherbes and the deputés Isaac René Guy le Chapelier and Jacques Guillaume Thouret, four times elected president of the Constituent Assembly, were taken to the scaffold.
- April 23: Robespierre creates a new Bureau of Police attached to the Committee of Public Safety, in opposition to the existing police under the Committee of General Safety.
- May 7: Robespierre asks the convention to decree "that the French people recognize the existence of a Supreme Being and the immortality of the soul", and to organize celebrations of the new cult.
- May 8: The chemist Antoine Lavoisier, along with twenty-six other former members of the Ferme générale, is tried and guillotined.
- May 8: Dramatic increase in competences for the revolutionary tribunal of Paris, making many of the tribunals outside of the capital city obsolete.
- May 10: Arrest of Jean Nicolas Pache, the former mayor of Paris, followed by his replacement by Jean-Baptiste Fleuriot-Lescot, a close ally of Robespierre.
- May 10: Execution of Madame Élisabeth, the sister of Louis XVI.
- June 1: Glorious First of June is fought between the British and French navies off Ushant. The French lose seven ships of the line, but a convoy carrying grain from the United States is able to dock in Brest.
- June 4: Robespierre is unanimously elected president of the convention.

=== June 8, 1794 – Festival of the Supreme Being; Acceleration of the Terror ===
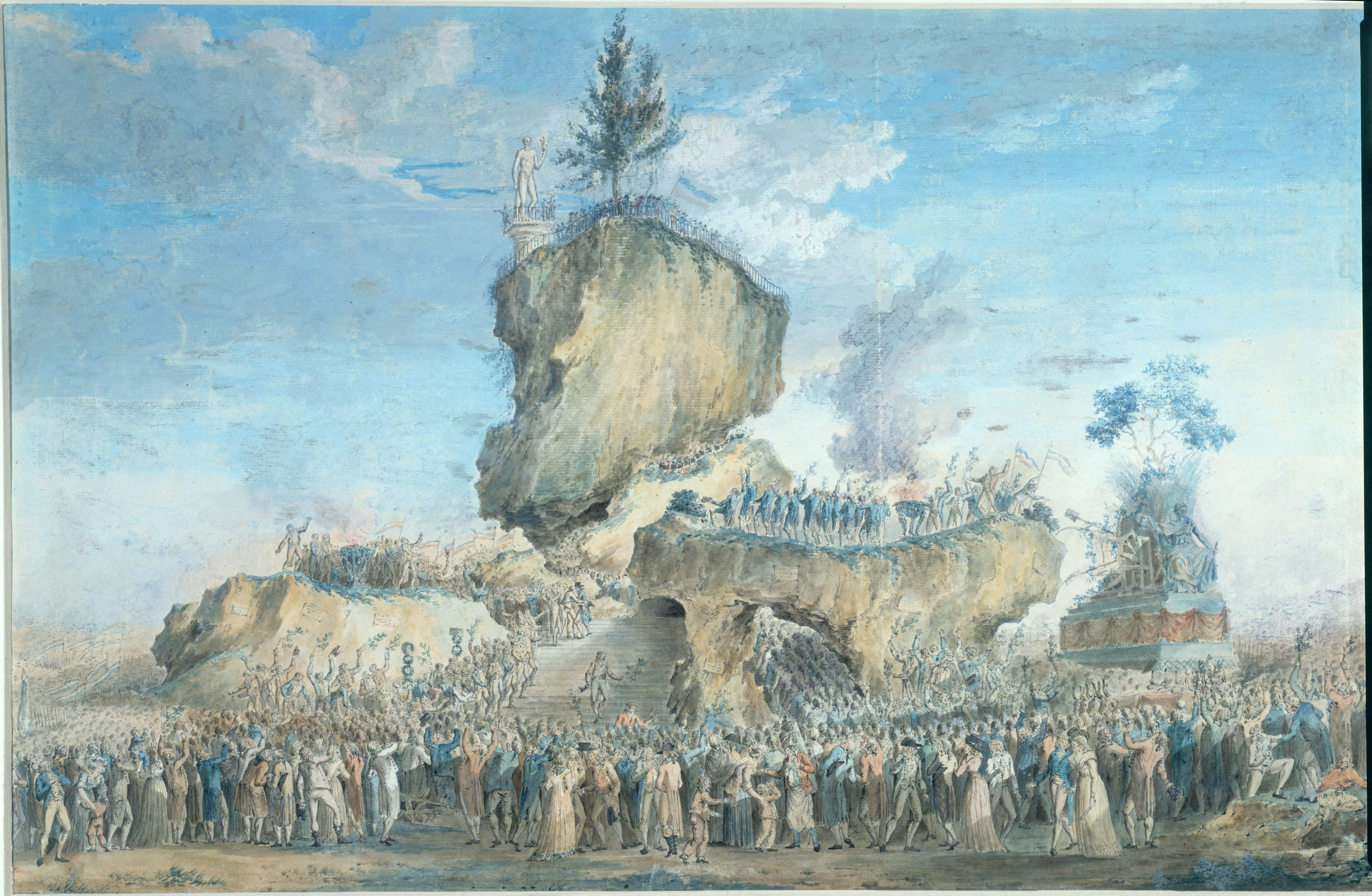
Stage of the Festival of the Supreme Being (June 8, 1794)

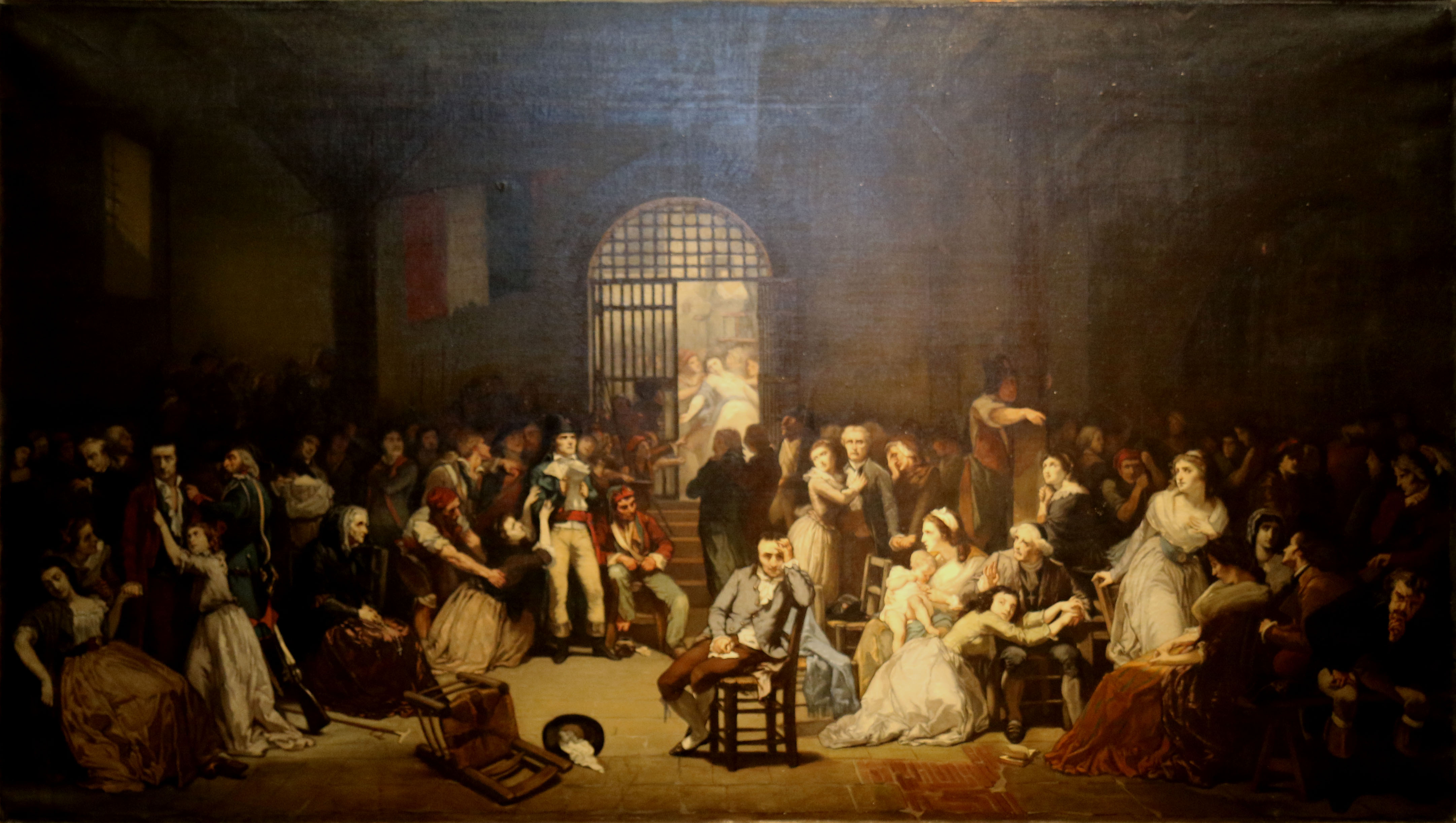
The poet André Chenier and other victims of the Terror await judgement at the Conciergerie (July 25, 1794)

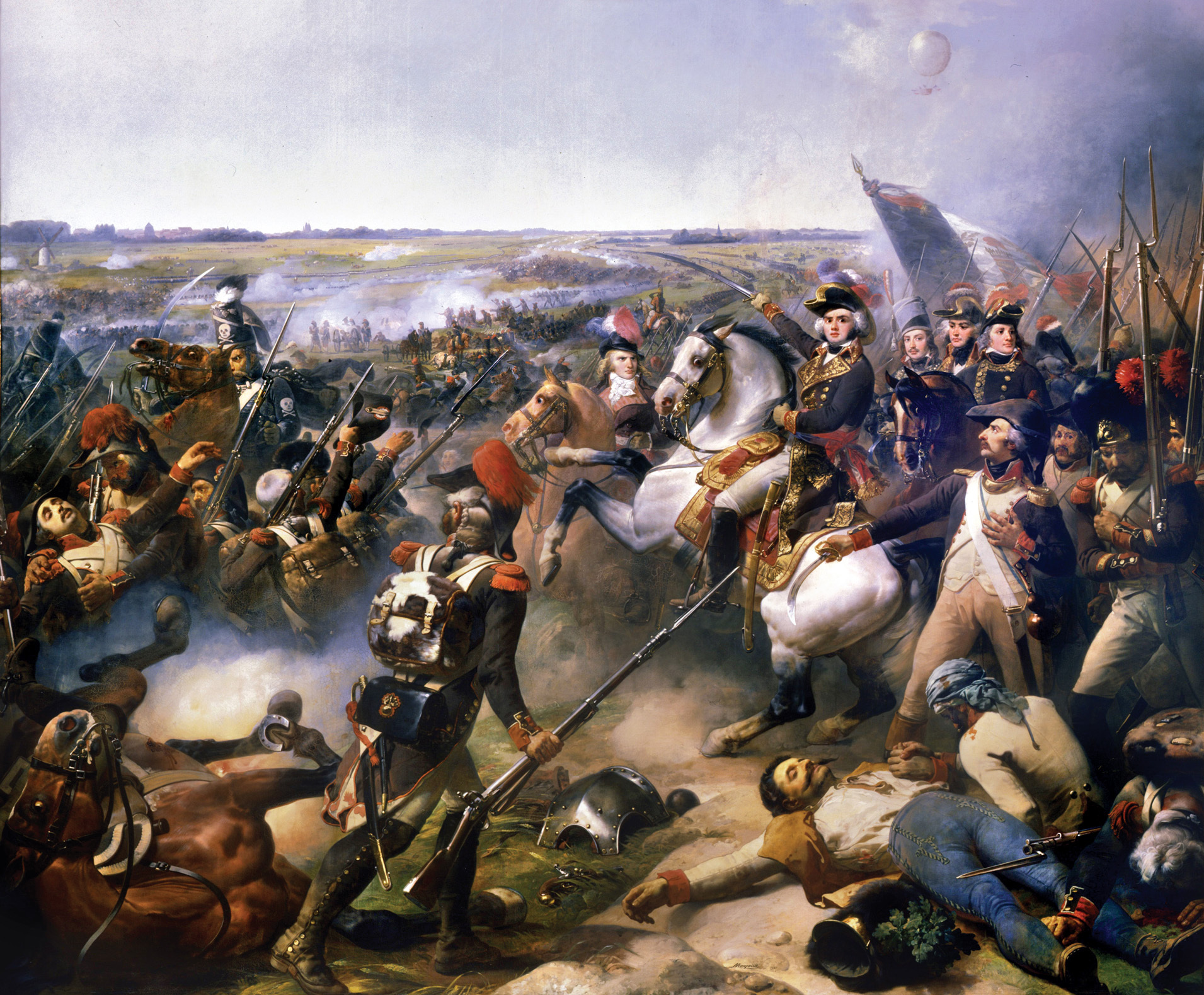
French victory at the Battle of Fleurus (June 26, 1794)
- June 8: Festival of the Supreme Being, conducted by Robespierre. Some deputies visibly show annoyance with his behavior at the Festival.
- June 10: Law of 22 Prairial - As the prisons are full, the Convention speeds up the trials of those accused. Witnesses are no longer required to testify. From June 11 to July 27, 1,376 prisoners are sentenced to death, with no acquittals, compared with 1251 death sentences in the previous fourteen months. The convention also gives itself the exclusive right to arrest its own members.
- June 12: Without naming names, Robespierre announces to the Convention that he will demand the heads of "intriguers" who are plotting against the convention.
- June 24: Carnot foresightedly despatched a large part of the Parisian artillery to the front.
- June 26: French forces under Jourdan defeat the Austrians at the Battle of Fleurus.
- June 29: Dispute within the Committee of Public Safety. Billaud-Varenne, Carnot and Collot d'Herbois accuse Robespierre of behaving like a dictator. He leaves the committee and does not return before July 23.
- July 1: Robespierre speaks at the Jacobin Club, denouncing a conspiracy against him within the convention, the Committee of Public Safety, and the Committee of General Security.
- July 8: French forces under Generals Jourdan and Pichegru capture Brussels from Austrians.
- July 9: Robespierre speaks again at the Jacobin Club, denying he has already made lists, and refusing to name those he plans to arrest.
- July 14: At the request of Robespierre, Joseph Fouché is expelled from the Jacobin Club.
- July 23: Alexandre de Beauharnais is tried and executed; his widow Joséphine de Beauharnais became Napoleon's mistress, and his wife in 1796.
- July 23: Robespierre attends a meeting of reconciliation with the members of the Committees of Public Safety and General Security, and the dispute seems settled.
- July 25: The poet André Chénier is among those guillotined.
- July 27: Marie Thérèse de Choiseul, the princess of Monaco is executed. Her execution would be one of the last during the Reign of Terror.

=== July 26–28, 1794 – Arrest and execution of Robespierre; End of the Terror ===
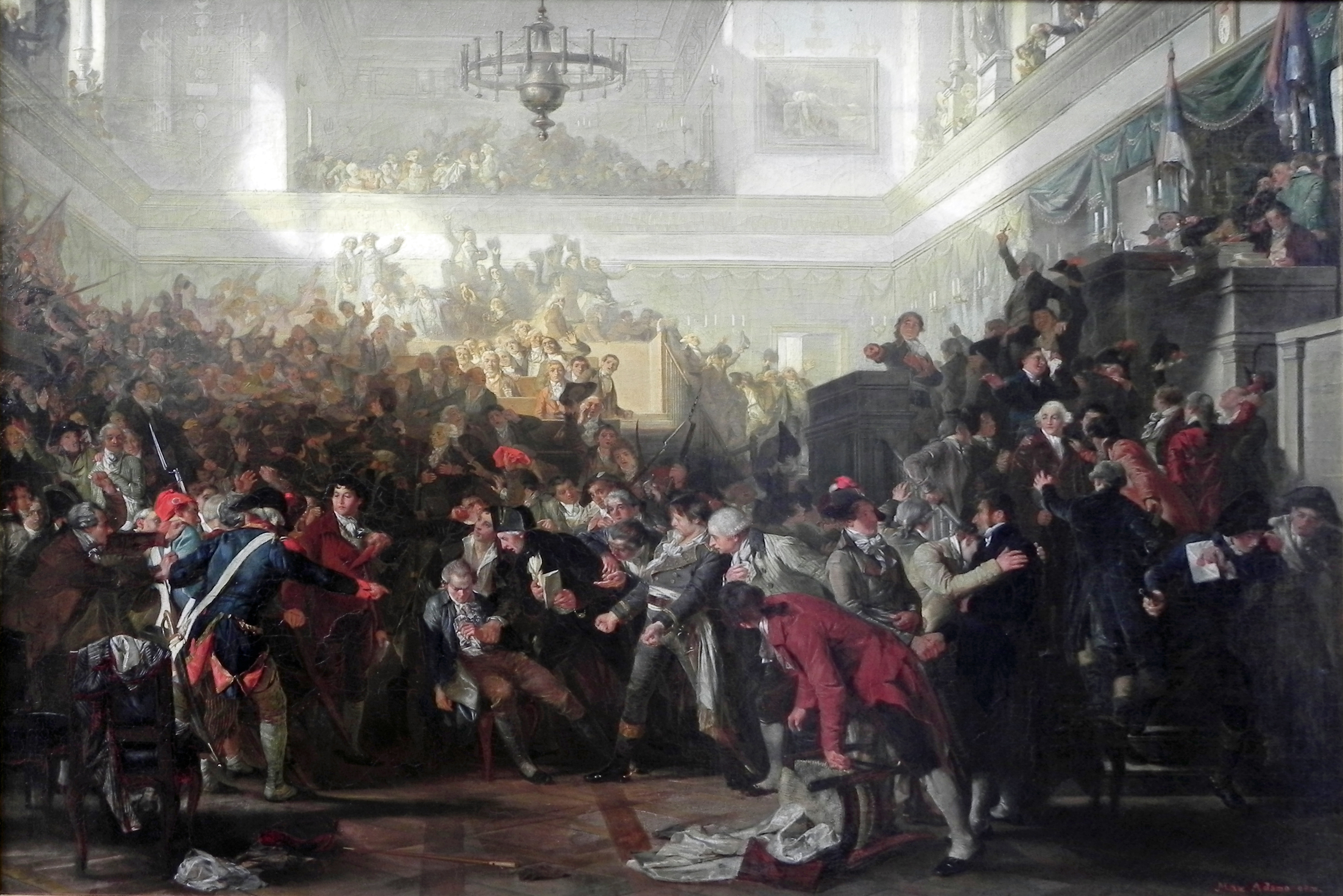
The Convention rises against Robespierre (July 27, 1794)

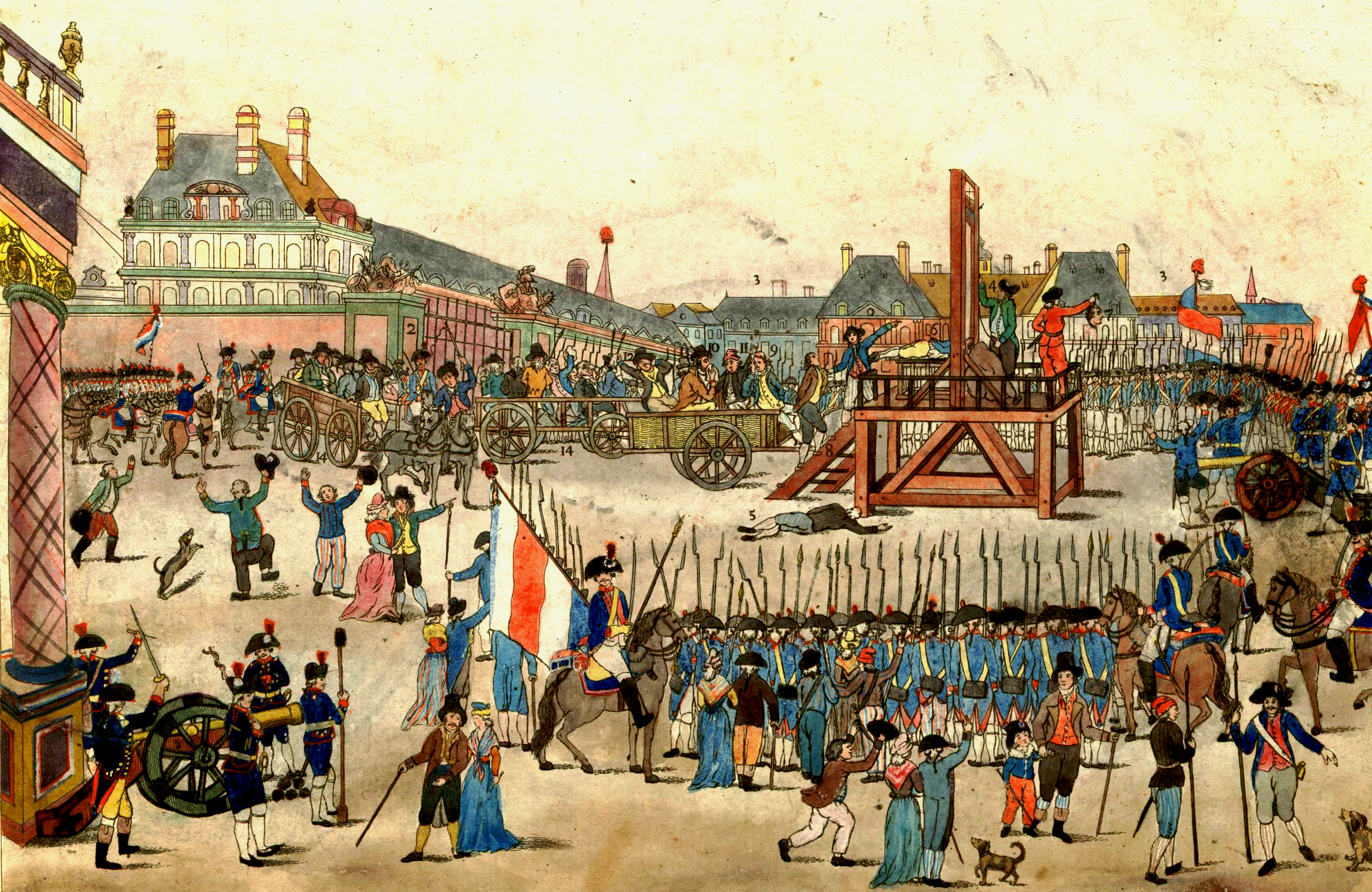
The execution of Robespierre (July 28, 1794)
- July 26: Robespierre gives a violent speech at the convention, demanding, without naming them, the arrest and punishment of "traitors" in the Committees of Public Safety and General Security. The Convention first votes to publish the speech, but Billaud-Varenne and Cambon demand names and attack Robespierre. The Convention sends Robespierre's speech to the Committees for further study, without action.
- July 27: At noon, Saint-Just began his speech in the convention, prepared to blame everything on Billaud, Collot d'Herbois and Carnot. After a few minutes, Tallien interrupted him and began the attack. When the accusations began to pile up the Convention voted the arrest of Robespierre, and of his younger brother Augustin Robespierre, Saint-Just, Couthon and Lebas. François Hanriot warned the sections that there would be an attempt to murder Robespierre and mobilized 2,400 National Guards in front of the town hall. In the meantime the five were taken to a prison, but refused by the jailors. An administrator of the police took Robespierre the older around 8 p.m. to the police administration on Île de la Cité; Robespierre insisted being received in a prison. He hesitated for legal reasons for possibly two hours. At around 10 p.m. the mayor appointed a delegation to go and convince Robespierre to join the Commune movement. Then the Convention declared the five deputies (plus the supporting members) to be outlaws. They expected crowds of supporters to join them during the night, but most left losing time in fruitless deliberation, without supplies or instructions.
- July 28: At two in the morning, soldiers loyal to the Convention take the Hôtel de Ville without a fight. Robespierre is wounded in the jaw by a gunshot, either from a gendarme or self-inflicted. His brother is badly injured jumping from the window. In the morning, Robespierre and his supporters are taken to the Revolutionary Tribunal for formal identification. Since they have been declared outside the law, no trial is considered necessary. In the evening of July 28, Robespierre and his supporters, including his brother, Saint-Just, Couthon and Hanriot, 22 in all, are guillotined.
- July 29: Arrest and execution of seventy allies of Robespierre within the Paris Commune. In all, 106 Robespierrists are guillotined.
- August 5: Inmates of Paris prisons arrested under the Law of Suspects are released.
- August 9: Napoléon Bonaparte is arrested in Nice, but released on August 20.
- August 24: The Convention reorganizes the government, distributing power among sixteen different committees.
- August 29: First anti-Jacobin demonstration in Paris by disaffected young middle-class Parisians called Muscadins.
- August 30: French army retakes Condé-sur-l'Escaut. All French territory is now freed of foreign occupation.
- August 31: The Convention puts Paris under the direct control of the national government.
- September 1: The Musée des Monuments français is founded to protect religious architecture and art threatened with destruction.
- September 13: The Abbé Grégoire, a member of the convention, coins the term "vandalism" to describe destruction of religious monuments across France
- September 18: The Convention stops paying officially sanctioned priests and stops maintaining church properties.
- September 21: The remains of Marat are placed in the Panthéon.
- October 1: Confrontations in the meetings of the Paris sections between supporters and opponents of the Terror.
- October 3: Arrest of the leaders of the bands of armed sans-culottes in Paris.
- October 6: A French army captures Cologne.
- October 22: Foundation of the Central School of Public Works, the future École Polytechnique
- November 9: Muscadins attack the Jacobin Club. The attack is repeated on November 11.
- November 12: The Convention orders the suspension of meetings of the Jacobin Club.
- November 19: Treaty of London between the United States and England calls for joint suppression of French corsairs and a blockade of French ports.
- December 3: The Convention forms a committee of sixteen members to complete work on the Constitution of 1793.
- December 8: Seventy-three surviving Girondin deputies are given seats again in the convention.
- December 16: Conviction and execution of the Jacobin Carrier for ordering the mass execution of as many as 10.000 prisoners in the Vendée
- December 24: The Convention repeals the law setting maximum prices for grain and other food products.

== 1795 – The Directory Replaces the Convention ==
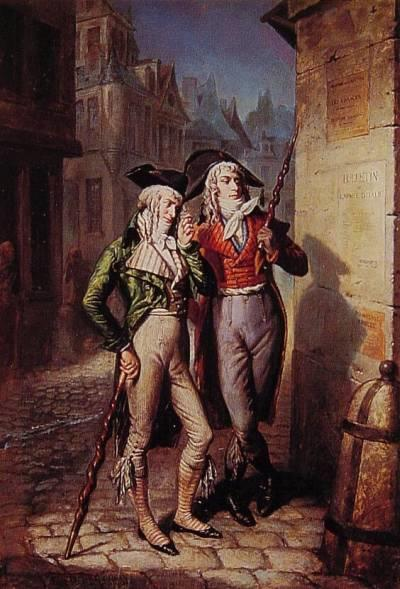
Two Muscadins in Paris (1795)

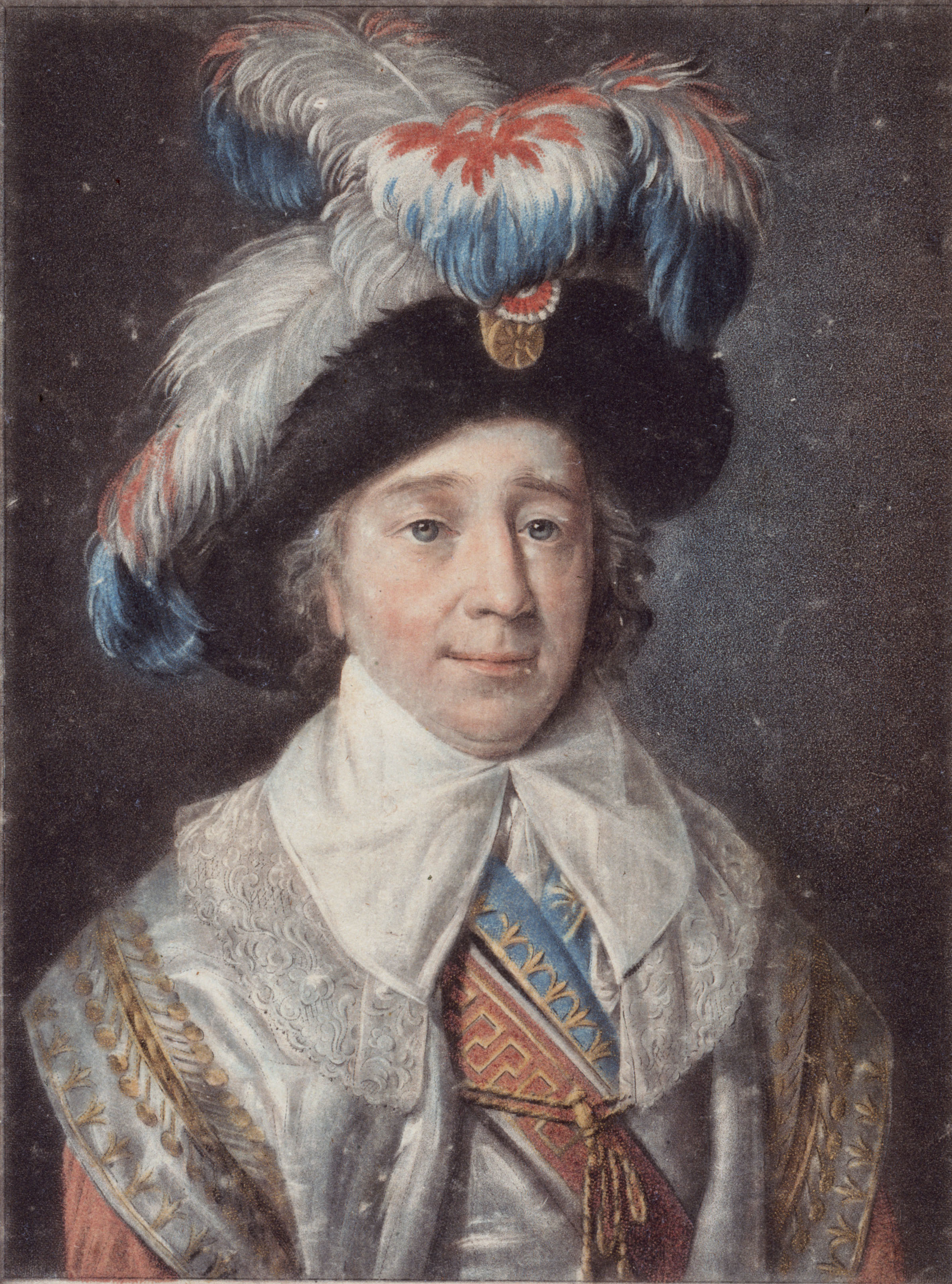
Paul Barras in the ceremonial dress of a French Director
- January 19: French army of Pichegru captures Amsterdam.
- January 21: French cavalry capture the Dutch fleet, trapped in the ice at Den Helder.
- February 2: Confrontations between Muscadins and sans-culottes in Paris streets.
- February 5: The semi-official government newspaper Le Moniteur Universel condemns the past incitement to violence and terror by Marat and his allies.
- February 8: Removal of the remains of Marat and three other extreme Jacobins from the Panthéon.
- February 14; Several former Jacobin leaders in Lyon, who conducted the Terror there, are assassinated, beginning of the so-called First White Terror.
- February 17: An amnesty granted to former Vendéen rebels, restoring freedom of religion.
- February 21: On a proposal by Boissy d'Anglas, the Convention proclaims freedom of religion and the separation of church and state.
- February 22: In the convention, the deputy Rovère demands the punishment of Jacobins who carried out the Terror. Former Jacobin leaders in several cities placed under arrest. Four Jacobins in Nîmes who conducted the Terror there are assassinated.
- March 2: The Convention orders the arrest of Barère, Billaud-Varenne, Collot d'Herbois and Vadier, the Jacobins who had orchestrated the downfall of Robespierre.
- March 5: In Toulon, arrest of the Jacobins who had carried out mass executions of the population.
- March 8: Riot in Toulon by sans-culottes, who execute seven imprisoned émigrés.
- March 17: Food riots in Paris.
- March 19: Grain supplies in Paris are exhausted. The assignat falls to eight percent of its original value.
- March 21: On a proposal by Sieyès, the Convention votes the death penalty for leaders of movements who try to overthrow the government.
- March 28: Beginning of the trial of Fouquier-Tinville, the head of the Revolutionary Tribunal, who conducted the trials during the Terror.
- April 1: Insurrection of 12 Germinal, Year III. Sans-culottes invade Convention, but leave when the National Guard arrives. Paris is declared in a state of siege.
- April 1: The Convention orders the deportation to French Guiana of Barère, Billaud-Varenne, and Collot d'Herbois, and the arrest of eight extreme-left deputies.
- April 2: The French army under Pichegru suppresses an armed uprising in the Faubourg Saint-Antoine.
- April 5: Signature of a peace agreement between Prussia and France in Basel. Prussia accepts the French annexation of the left bank of the Rhine.
- April 10: Convention orders the disarmament of Jacobins who were involved in the Terror.
- April 11: The Convention restores civic rights to all citizens declared outside the law since May 31, 1793.
- April 19: Assassination of six Jacobins involved in the Terror in Bourg-en-Bresse.
- April 23: The Convention names a commission of eight members to revise the Constitution.
- May 2: Agreement of last Vendéen rebels to lay down their arms in exchange for amnesty.
- May 4: Massacre of twenty-five Jacobins imprisoned in Lyon.
- May 7: The former chief prosecutor, Fouquier-Tinville, and the fourteen jurors of the Revolutionary Tribunal are condemned to death and guillotined.

=== May 20–24, 1795 – Last Paris uprising by the Jacobins and sans-culottes ===
- May 20: Armed uprising against the Convention by Jacobins and sans-culottes. They invade the hall of the convention and kill deputy Féraud. The army responds quickly and clears out the hall. The Convention votes the arrest of the Deputies involved in the uprising.
- May 21: New uprising of Jacobins and sans-culottes in Paris; they occupy the Hôtel de Ville.
- May 22: Third day of uprising in Paris. The Convention orders the army to occupy the Faubourg Saint-Antoine.
- May 24: The army secures the Faubourg Saint-Antoine, and disarms and arrests the participants in the uprising.
- May 28: The last Jacobin former members of the Committees of Public Safety and General Security are arrested.
- May 31: The Convention abolishes the Revolutionary Tribunal.
- June 8: Death of the 10-year-old Louis XVII imprisoned in the Temple. His uncle in exile, the comte de Provence, inherits the title as Louis XVIII, king of France.
- June 10: The Convention decriminalizes the émigrés who fled France after the Jacobin seizure of power on May 26, 1793.
- June 12: Deputies who supported the May 20–22 uprising are put on trial.
- June 17: Suicide of six deputies condemned to death for participation in the May 20–22 uprising.

=== June 25 – July 27, 1795 – Renewed uprisings in the Vendée and a royalist invasion of Brittany ===
- June 23: The rebels of the Vendée, under Charette, resume their rebellion.
- June 23: In support of the Chouans, an army of émigrés, under the command of Joseph de Puisaye, landed at Quiberon.
- June 26: An army of four thousand royalist émigrés is landed by the British in the Bay of Carnac in Brittany.
- June 30: The royalist army of émigrés in Brittany is defeated in front of Vannes by General Hoche.
- June 30: The Chouans are forced to abandon Auray. The royalist army retreats to the peninsula of Quiberon, where on July 7 they are besieged by Hoche.
- July 14: La Marseillaise is adopted as the national anthem.
- July 15: Two thousand more royalist émigrés are landed at Quiberon, where they also are trapped by Hoche.
- July 17: The French Army of the Western Pyrenees in Spain under Moncey captures Vitoria-Gasteiz and takes Bilbao on July 19.
- July 21: The royalist army in Quiberon surrenders. 748 émigrés are executed by firing squad.
- July 22: The Peace of Basel is signed between Spain and France. France receives from Spain the eastern portion of the island of Saint-Dominigue (now the Dominican Republic). With Spain out of the war, France is at war only with Austria and England.
- August 9: The Convention orders the arrest of Joseph Fouché and several other Montagnard deputies.
- August 15: The Convention adopts the Franc as the French monetary unit.

=== August 22 – September 23, 1795 – The new Constitution is approved ===
- August 22: Constitution of the Year III (Constitution de l'An III), the new Constitution, is adopted by the convention. It calls for an upper and lower house of the parliament, on the American and British models, and an executive Directory of five members. According to the terms of the Constitution, two-thirds of the deputies of the new Assembly are former deputies of the convention.
- September 23: Approved by a national referendum, the new Constitution comes into effect.

=== October 5, 1795 – "A whiff of grapeshot": General Bonaparte suppresses a royalist rebellion in Paris ===
- October 5: An armed royalist uprising threatens the convention. On the orders of Paul Barras, in charge of the defense of Paris, General Bonaparte leads the army against the uprising. He uses cannons with grapeshot to break up a rebel gathering in front of the church of Saint-Roch, rue Saint-Honoré.
- October 12: Beginning of elections to the new chambers of the legislature, the Council of Five Hundred and the Council of Ancients.
- October 12: Montagnard army officers dismissed under the convention are reintegrated into the army.
- October 23: The assignat falls to just three percent of its nominal value. Twenty billion (20,000,000,000) notes in circulation.
- October 26: Bonaparte is named commander in chief of the Army of the Interior.
- October 31: The first Directory is elected by the legislature; its members are Louis Marie de La Révellière-Lépeaux, Jean-François Rewbell, Étienne-François Letourneur, Paul Barras and Emmanuel Joseph Sieyès, who declines to serve and is replaced by Lazare Carnot.
- December 10: The legislature votes a forced loan of six hundred million francs to be taken from the wealthiest French citizens.
- December 26: The daughter of Louis XVI and Marie-Antoinette, Madame Royale, imprisoned in the Temple since August 1792, is exchanged for a group of republican prisoners held in Austria.
- December 31: Armistice on the Rhine halting combat between the French and Austrian armies.

== 1796 – Napoleon's campaign in Italy; Defeat of the royalists in the Vendée; a failed uprising in Paris ==
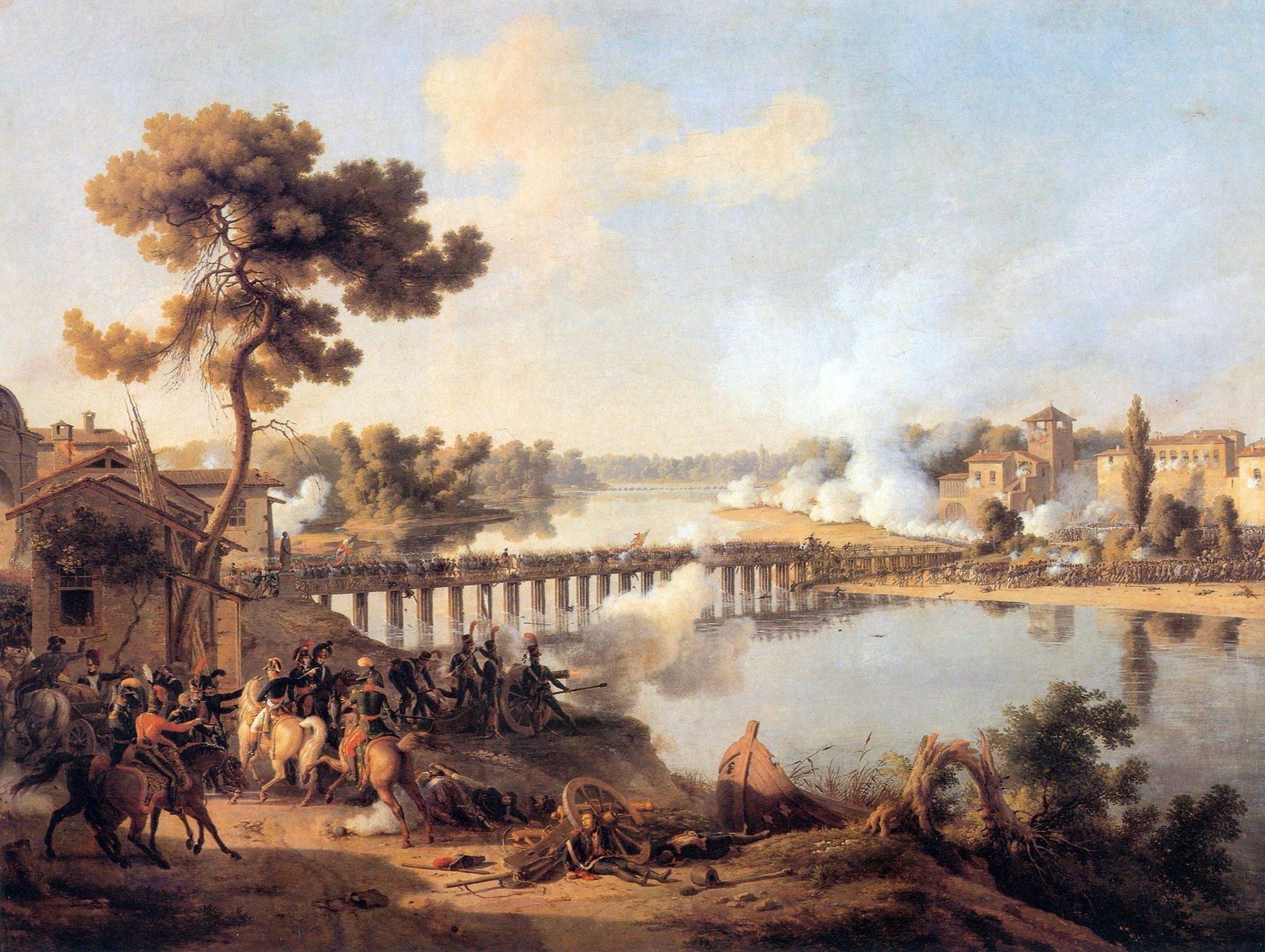
General Bonaparte defeats the Austrians at the Battle of Lodi (May 10, 1796)

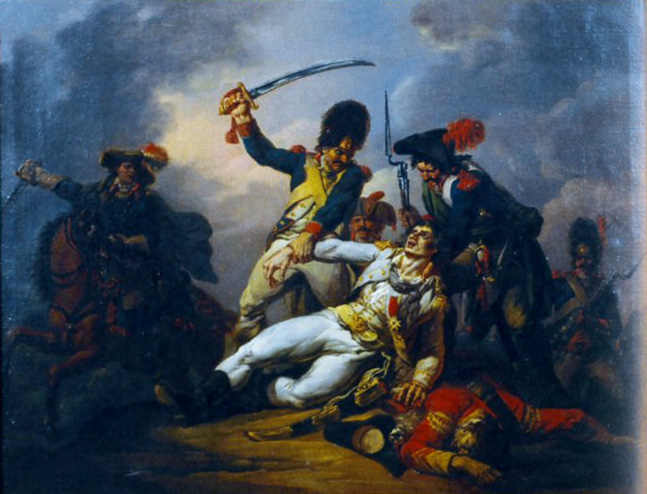
The capture of François de Charette, the royalist leader in the Vendée (February 23, 1796)

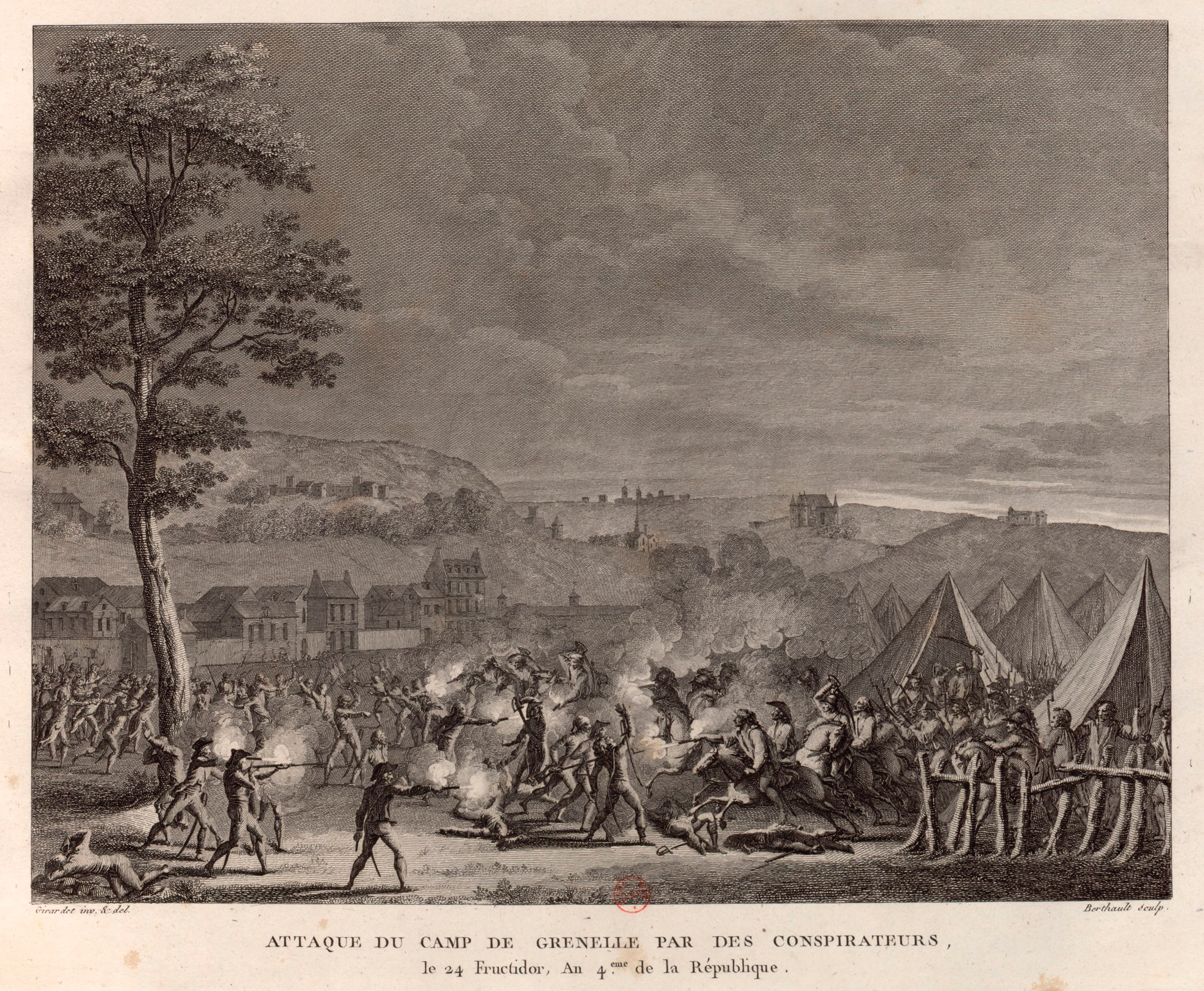
Failed uprising at the Grenelle military camp by Montagnards and followers of Babeuf (9 September 1796)

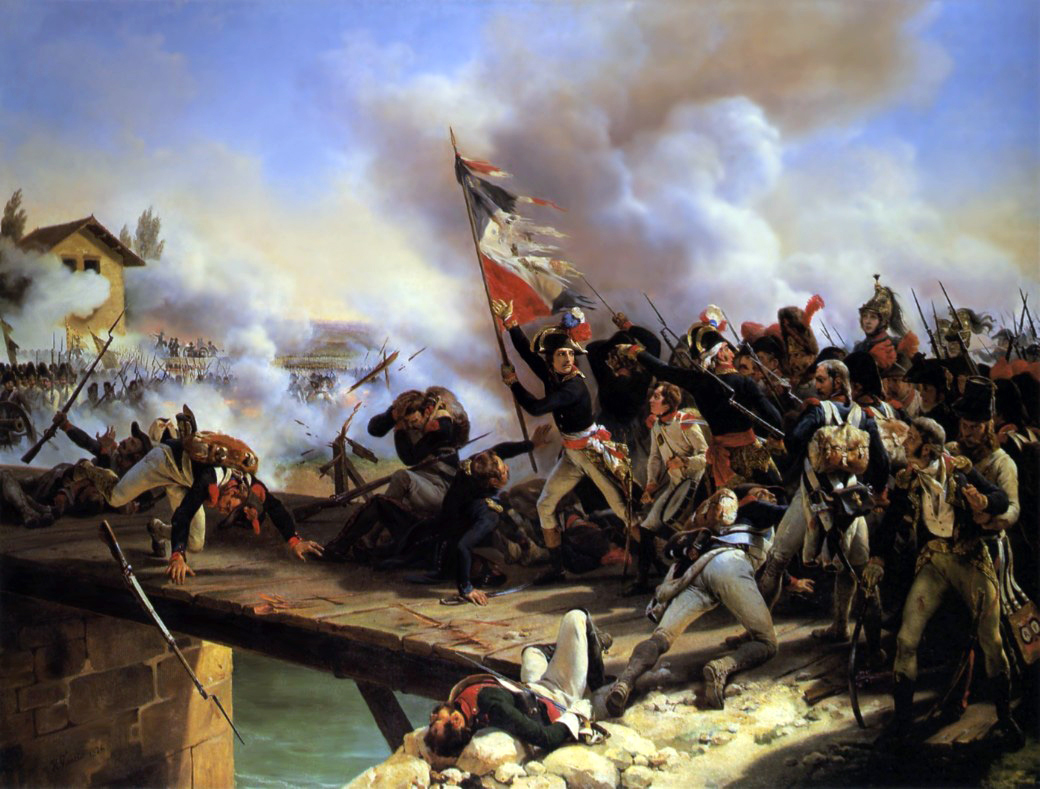
General Bonaparte leads his soldiers across a bridge at the Battle of Arcole (November 15–17, 1796)
- January 2: Creation by the Directory of the Ministry of the Police, under Merlin de Douai.
- January 21: Commemoration of the anniversary of Louis XVI's execution. Director Rewbell gives a speech denouncing the extremism of the left.
- January 25: The Directory is given the provisional power to name the administrators of cities.
- January 26: The royalist and rebel leader Nicolas Stofflet tries to restart the War in the Vendée.
- February 2: Wolfe Tone, leader of the Irish revolutionaries, arrives in France, seeking military support to liberate Ireland.
- February 19: The government stops issuing assignats, which have lost most of their value. Thirty-nine billion (39,000,000,000) are in circulation.
- February 20: The United States and Britain extend their treaty of November 19, 1794. Relations between France and the United States deteriorate.
- February 23: The Vendéen rebel and royalist leader Nicolas Stofflet is captured and executed by firing squad in Angers the following day.
- February 28: On the orders of the Directory, General Bonaparte closes the extreme leftist Club du Panthéon, founded by a follower of Marat.
- March 2: The Directory names General Bonaparte the commander of the Army of Italy.
- March 9: Marriage of Napoléon Bonaparte and Joséphine de Beauharnais, the widow of Alexandre de Beauharnais, a French general and political leader guillotined during the Reign of Terror.
- March 18: The Directory replaces the assignat with two billion four hundred million Mandats territoriaux, which can be used to purchase nationalized property. Within three weeks they lose eighty percent of their value.
- March 23: François de Charette, last leader of the royalist rebellion in Vendée, is captured and executed by firing squad in Nantes.
- March 30: François-Noël Babeuf, known as "Gracchus Babeuf", the ultra-leftist leader and precursor of Communism, forms an insurrectional committee and movement, called Les Égaux ("the Equals"), to overthrow the government. They hold a demonstration in Paris on April 6.
- April 10: Bonaparte begins his Italian campaign with victories over the Austrians at Montenotte (April 12) and the Sardinians at Millesimo (April 13).
- May 2: Babeuf's followers and the remaining Montagnards form a common plan to overthrow the Directory.
- May 9: Bonaparte forces an armistice upon the Duke and Duchess of Parma.
- May 10: Bonaparte defeats the Austrians at the Battle of Lodi.
- May 15: Treaty signed in Paris between the Directory and king Victor Amadeus III of Sardinia. The king agrees to cede Savoy and Nice to France.
- May 19: In Milan, Bonaparte promises "independence" for Italy.
- May 20: The Austrians renounce the armistice along the Rhine, and the war resumes on that front.
- June 4: Bonaparte begins the siege of Mantua, the last Italian city held by Austria.
- June 5: Bonaparte signs an armistice with the king of Sicily.
- June 12: Bonaparte's army enters Romagna, one of the Papal States.
- June 22: End of the civil war in the west of France, with the submission of Georges Cadoudal and the departure of Louis de Frotté for England.
- June 23: Bonaparte signs the Armistice of Bologna with the Holy See, which permits the French occupation of the northern Papal States.
- July 9: The Island of Elba is occupied by the British.
- July 10: A new Austrian army under Wurmser arrives in Italy.
- July 16: General Kléber captures Frankfurt.
- July 18: French army under General Laurent de Gouvion Saint-Cyr captures Stuttgart.
- July 20: General Hoche is named head of an army to invade Ireland in support of the Irish independence movement.
- August 5: Bonaparte defeats the Austrians under Wurmser at the Battle of Castiglione. The Austrian army retreats to the Tyrol.
- August 19: Treaty of alliance signed between France and Spain at San Ildefonso.
- September 8: Bonaparte defeats the Austrians under Wurmser at the Battle of Bassano.
- September 9: Grenelle camp affair - failed uprising by supporters of Gracchus Babeuf against the French Directory
- October 5: Spain, now allied with France, declares war on Britain.
- October 10: The thirty-two leaders of the September 9–10 Babeuf uprising are tried by a military tribunal and sentenced to death.
- October 16: Bonaparte encourages the proclamation of a Cispadane Republic in northern Italy, composed of Modena and some of the Papal states.
- November 2: Austria sends two more armies to northern Italy to confront Bonaparte.
- November 15–17: Decisive victory of Bonaparte over the Austrians at the Battle of Arcole.
- December 4: Abrogation of the harshest parts of the October 25, 1795 laws punishing émigrés and refractory priests.
- December 15–17: Departure from Brest of a fleet carrying a French army commanded by Hoche to invade Ireland.
- December 24–25: Storms dislocate the French invasion fleet off the coast of Ireland and force it to return to France.

== 1797 – Bonaparte chases the Austrians from Italy; a republican coup d'état against the royalists in Paris ==
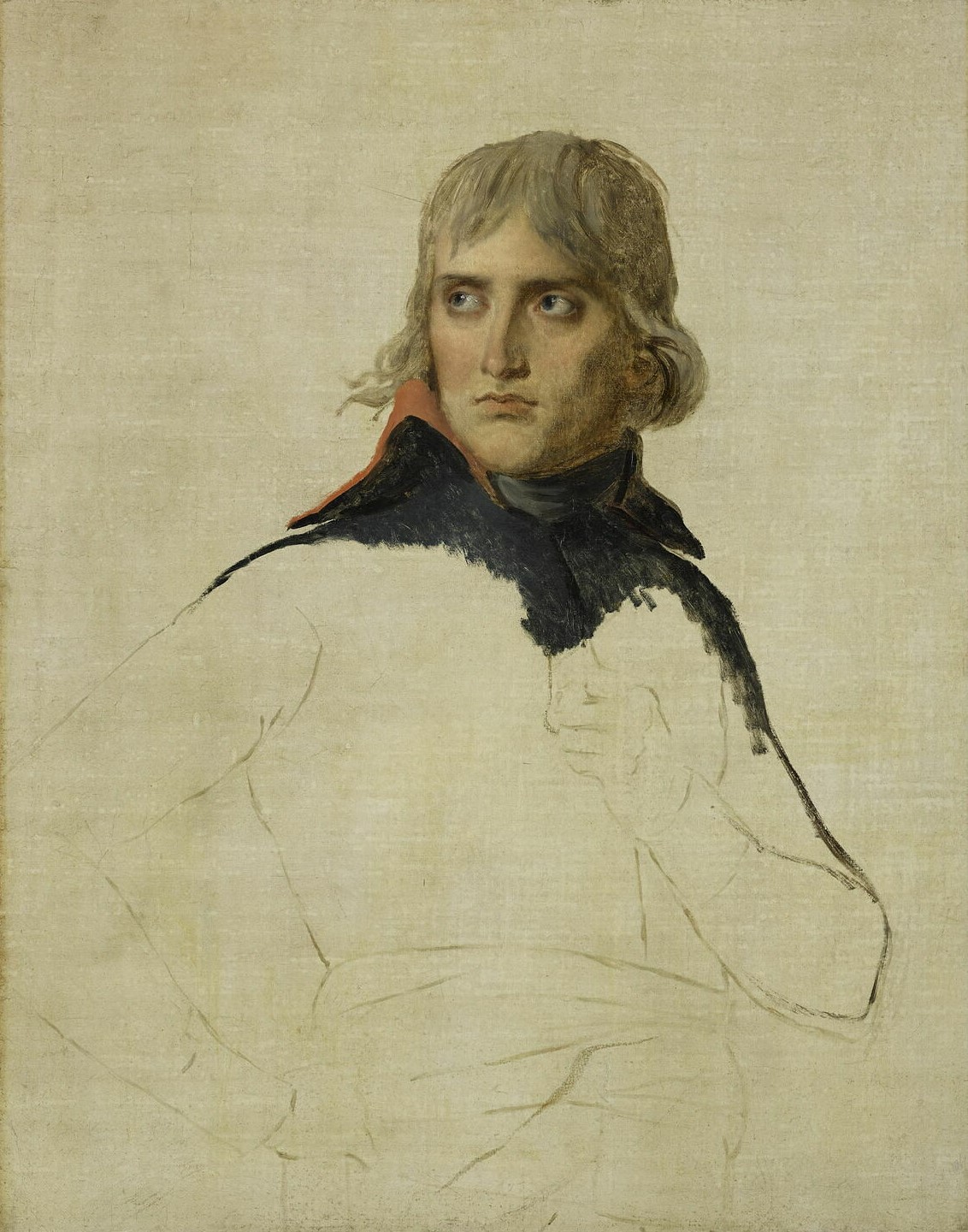
General Bonaparte by David (1797)

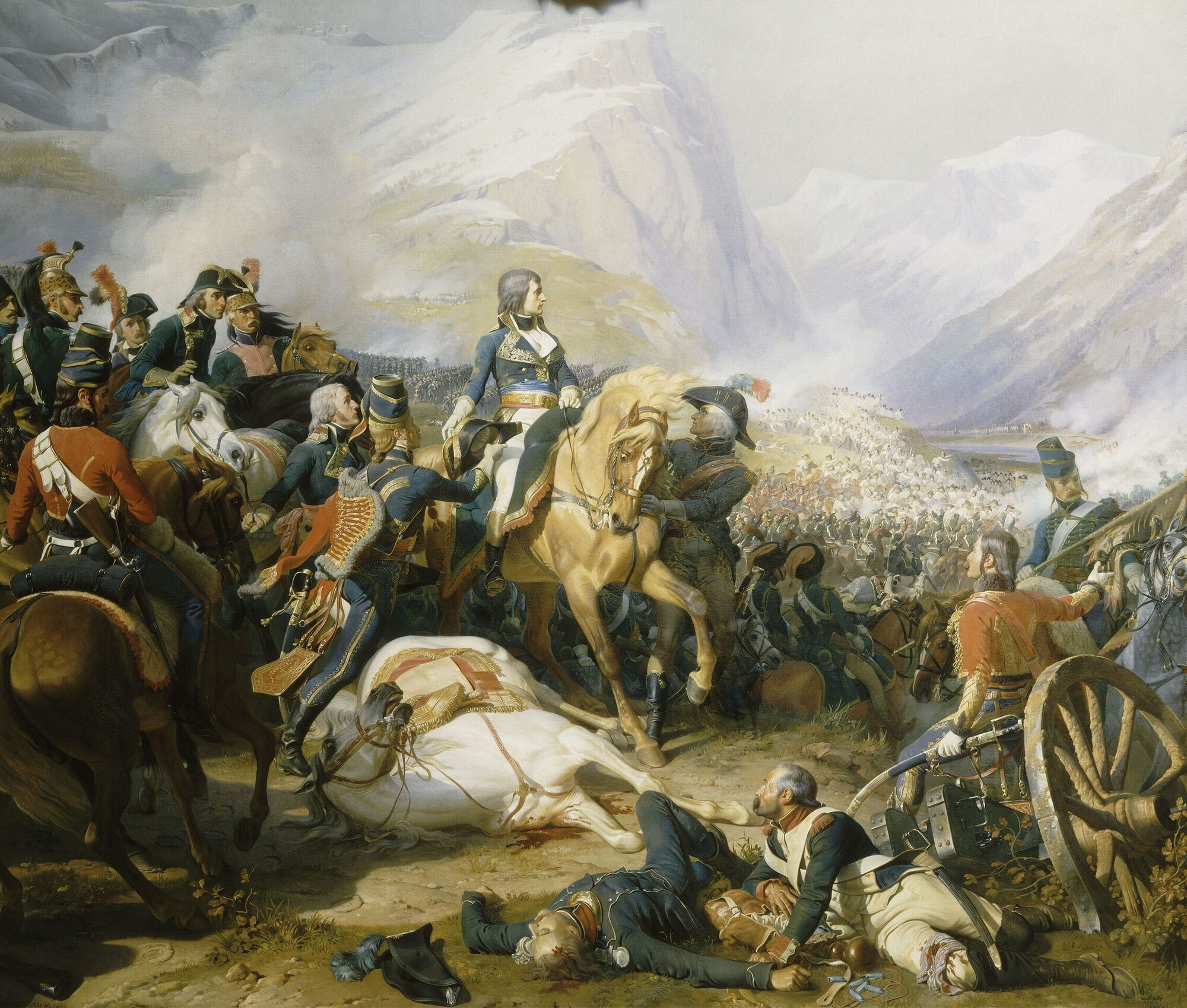
Bonaparte defeats Austrians at the Battle of Rivoli (January 14, 1797 )

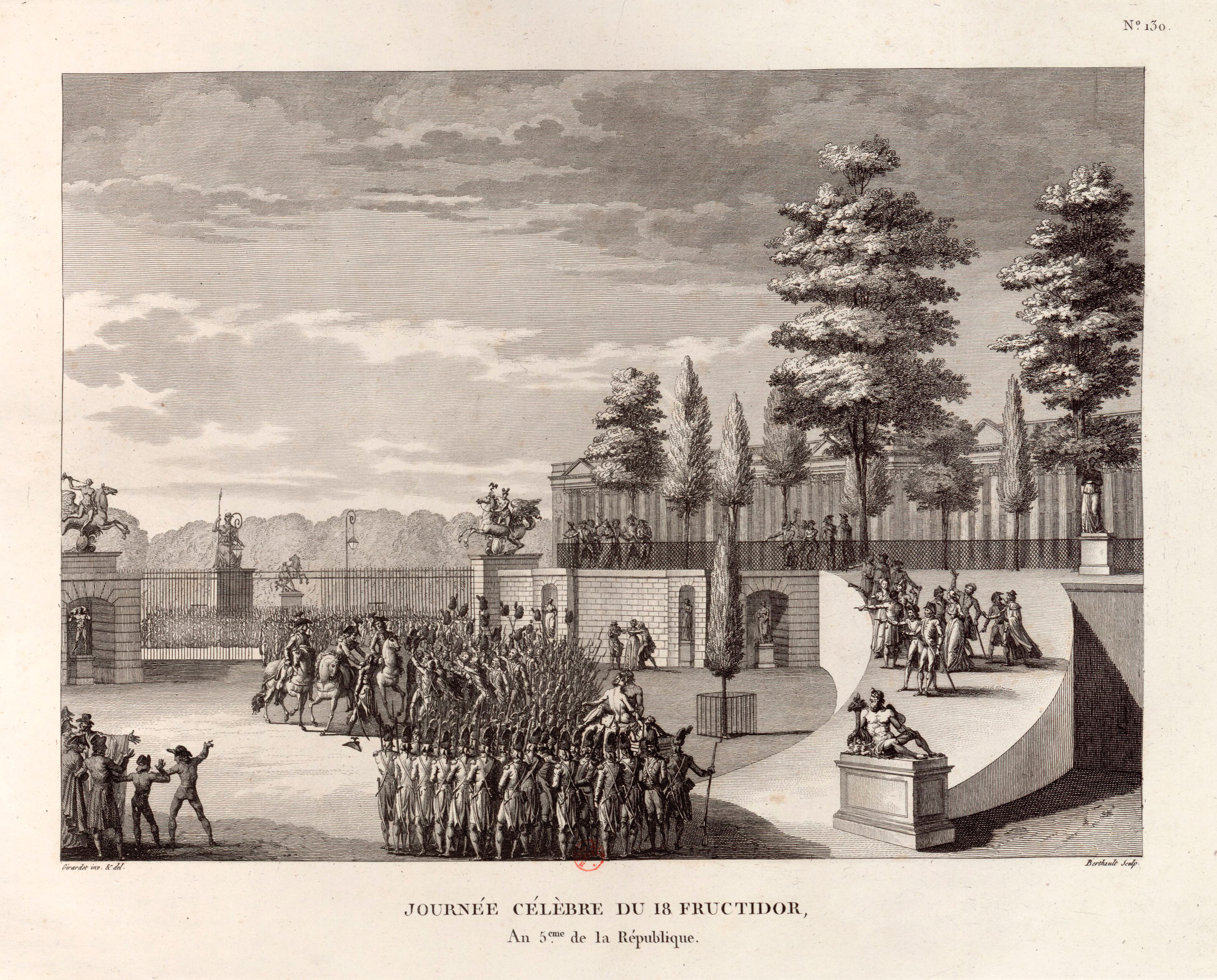
Republican coup d'état of September 4, 1797. Arrest of General Pichegru and other royalist leaders of the legislature by the army at the Tuileries Palace.

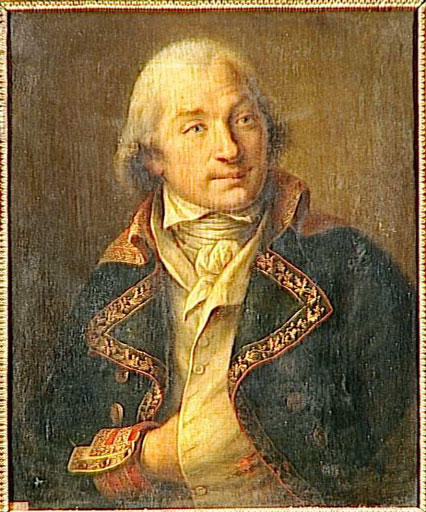
General Pichegru, leader of the royalist party
- January 7: A new Austrian army commanded by General József Alvinczi is sent to fight General Bonaparte in Italy.
- January 14: Bonaparte defeats the Austrians at the Battle of Rivoli.
- February 2: Surrender of last Austrian forces in Italy, in Mantua, to Bonaparte.
- February 9: Bonaparte occupies Ancona to force Pope Pius VI to negotiate with him. Negotiations begin February 12.
- February 14: Defeat of the Spanish fleet, ally of the French, at the Battle of Cape Saint Vincent.
- February 19: Pius VI cedes Comtat Venaissin and the northern portion of the Italian papal states to the new Cispadane Republic.
- February 20: Beginning of the trial of Babeuf and his leading followers at the High Court of Justice in Vendôme.
- March 2: The Directory authorizes French warships to capture U.S. ships, in retaliation for the Jay Treaty.
- March 9: Bonaparte begins a new offensive in Italy against the army of the Archduke Charles, Duke of Teschen.
- March 18: French voters are required to take an oath of fidelity to the government before voting on April 18.
- April 7: After a series of victories by Bonaparte, the Austrians agree to negotiate.
- April 18: Preliminary Treaty of Leoben; Austria gives up its claim to the Austrian Netherlands ("Belgian Provinces"); a secret agreement divides the territories of Venice between Austria and France.
- April 18: Results of partial elections for the legislature. 205 of the 216 deputies running are defeated, and many are replaced by royalists.
- April 27: Massacre of anti-French insurgents in Verona by French army.
- April 30: The Directory ratifies the Treaty of Leoben.
- May 2: Bonaparte declares war on Venice.
- May 12: Revolutionaries overthrow the government council (Patriciate) of Venice.
- May 16: Bonaparte begins negotiations with the Doge of Venice, Ludovico Manin.
- May 20: New session of the French legislature begins. The royalist Pichegru is chosen president of the Council of Five Hundred, and another royalist, François Barbé-Marbois becomes president of the Council of Ancients.
- May 20: A drawing of lots removes the moderate republican Étienne-François Letourneur. He is replaced by the royalist diplomat François Barthélemy on June 6.
- May 26: The political agitator Babeuf and one supporter, Darthé, are sentenced to death. They are executed in Vendôme on May 27.
- June 4: First meeting of the Cercle Constitutionnel, a club of prominent moderate republican deputies. Its leaders include Sieyès, Talleyrand, and Garat.
- June 14: Bonaparte installs a new government in Genoa, with the aim of creating a new Ligurian Republic.
- June 24: The Director Paul Barras contacts General Hoche, seeking support for a coup d'état against the royalist majority in the two Councils.
- June 27: The royalist majority in the Councils repeals the law of October 25, 1795, which added punishments against refractory priests and émigrés.
- June 28: French troops land on Corfu, previously owned by Venice.
- June 28: General Hoche sends 15,000 soldiers from the Rhine to Brest via Paris, on the pretext of planning an invasion of Ireland.
- July 3: Talleyrand proposes a French expedition against Egypt.
- July 9: The French support the formation of the Cisalpine Republic, composed of the former Cispadane Republic and Lombardy.
- July 16: Conflict within the Directory between Barthélemy and Carnot, favorable to the monarchists, and the three pro-republican directors, Barras, La Révellière-Lépeaux, and Rewbell.
- July 17: The army of Hoche arrives within three leagues (see also: Units of measurement in France before the French Revolution) of Paris, a violation of the Constitution. The royalist Councils protest.
- July 20: Barras produces evidence that General Pichegru was in secret correspondence with Louis XVIII and the monarchists. Carnot joins sides with the three republican directors.
- July 25: The Councils vote a law forbidding political clubs, including the republican Cercle Constitutionnel.
- July 27: Bonaparte sends General Augereau to Paris as military commander of the city, to support a coup d'état against the royalists.
- August 16: Bonaparte writes to the Directory, proposing a military intervention in Egypt "to truly destroy England".

=== September 4, 1797 – A republican coup d'état against the royalists ===
- September 4: Coup d'état of 18 Fructidor against the royalists in the legislature. Augereau arrests Barthélemy, Pichegru, and the leading royalist deputies.
- September 5: The Directory forces the Councils to adopt new laws annulling the elections of 200 royalist deputies in 53 departments, and deporting 65 royalist leaders and journalists.
- September 8: Election of two new republican directors, Merlin de Douai and François de Neufchâteau, to replace Carnot and Barthélemy.
- September 23: General Augereau, who carried out the September 4 coup, is named commander of the new Army of the Rhine.
- September 29: Directory instructs Bonaparte to win major concessions in negotiations with Austria, and, in the event of refusal, to march on Vienna.
- October 17: Signature of peace between Austria and France in the Treaty of Campo Formio. Austria obtains Venice and its possessions, while France receives Belgium and the left bank of the Rhine River as far as Cologne.
- December 21: Bonaparte meets with the Irish leader Wolfe Tone to discuss a future French landing in Ireland.
- December 28: Anti-French riots in Rome, and murder of a French general, Mathurin-Léonard Duphot.
- December 29: Pope Pius VI apologizes to France for the Rome riots; apologies are rejected by the Directory.

== 1798 – New republics in Switzerland and Italy; an election annulled; Bonaparte invades Egypt ==
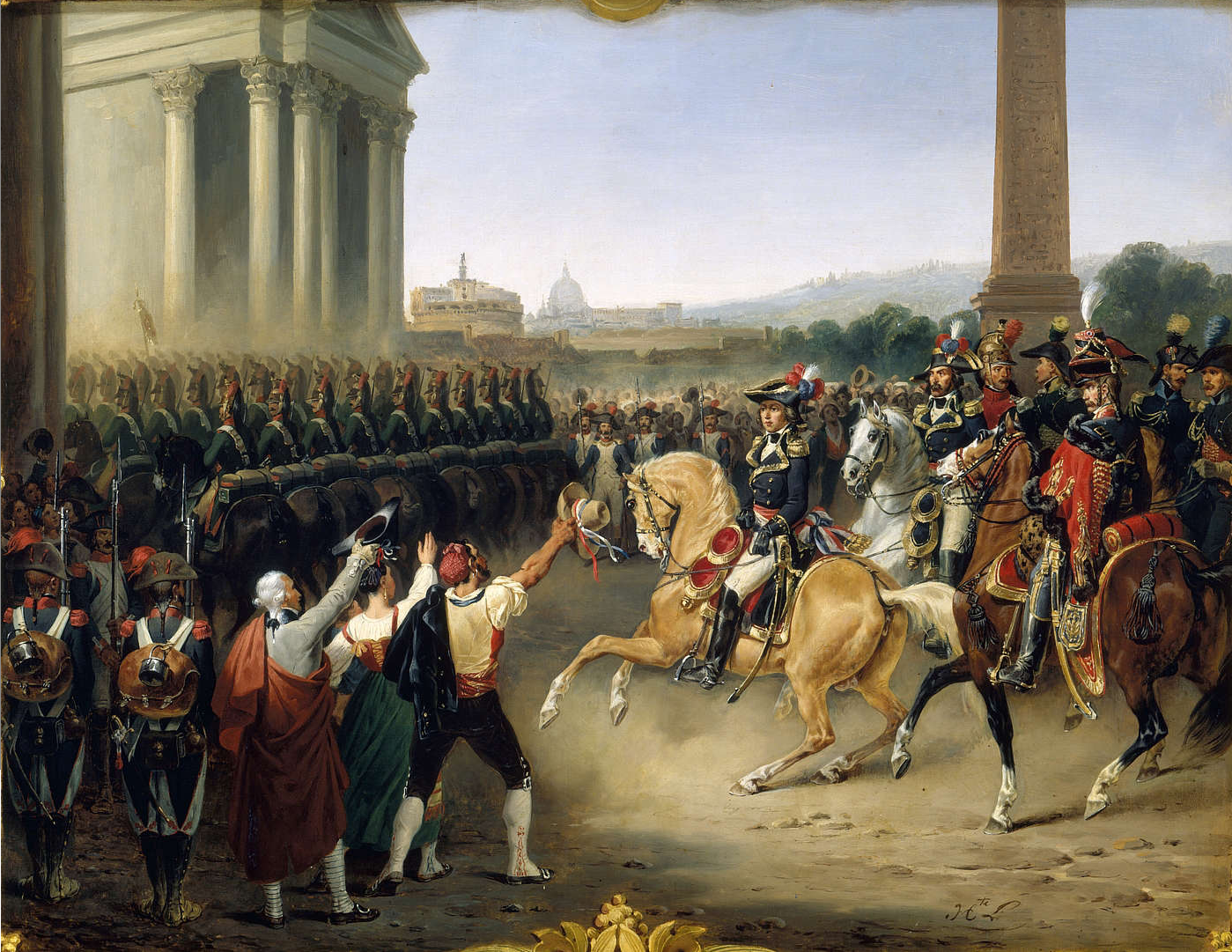
The French Army under General Berthier enters Rome (February 10, 1798)

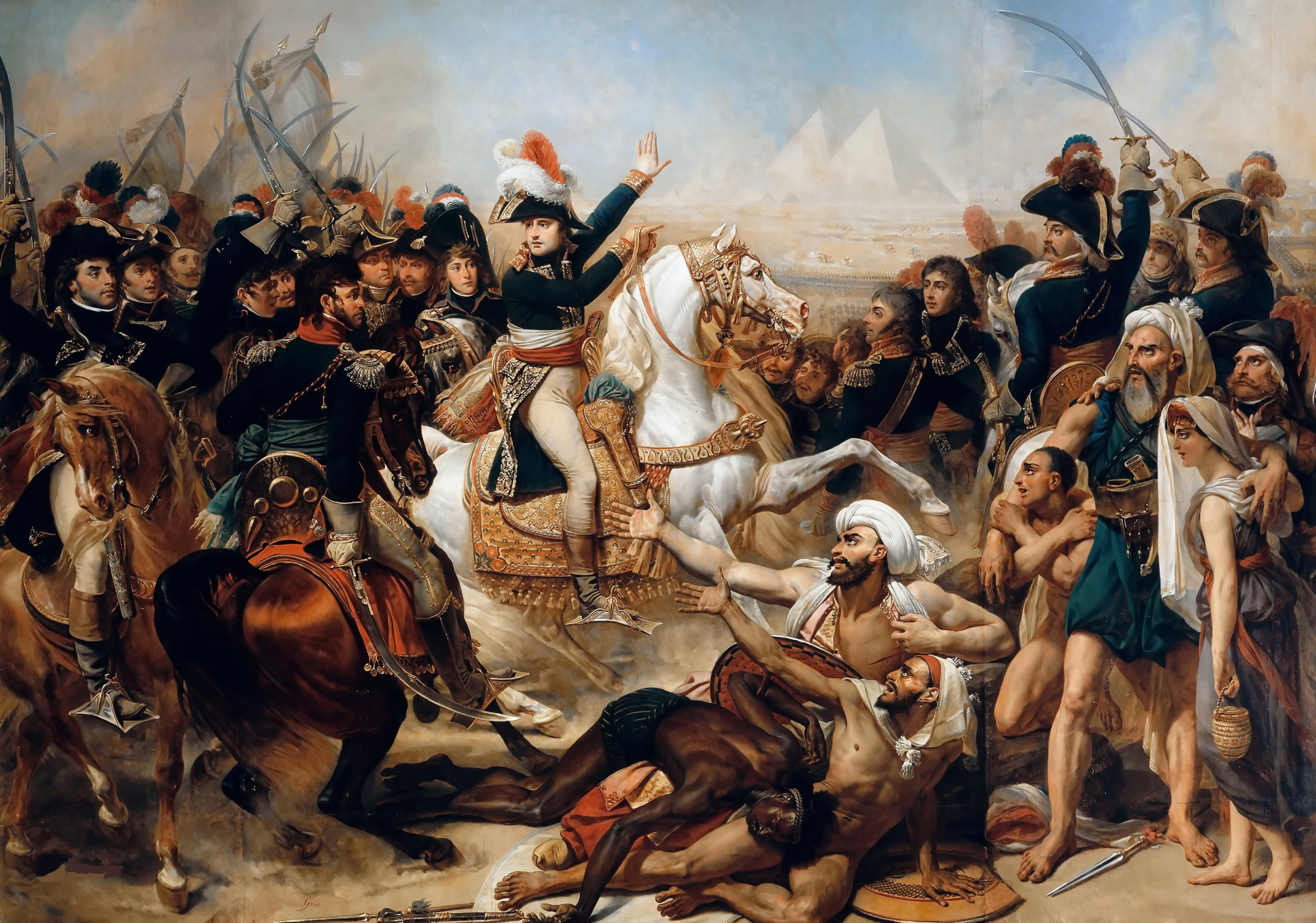
General Bonaparte at the Battle of the Pyramids (July 21, 1798)

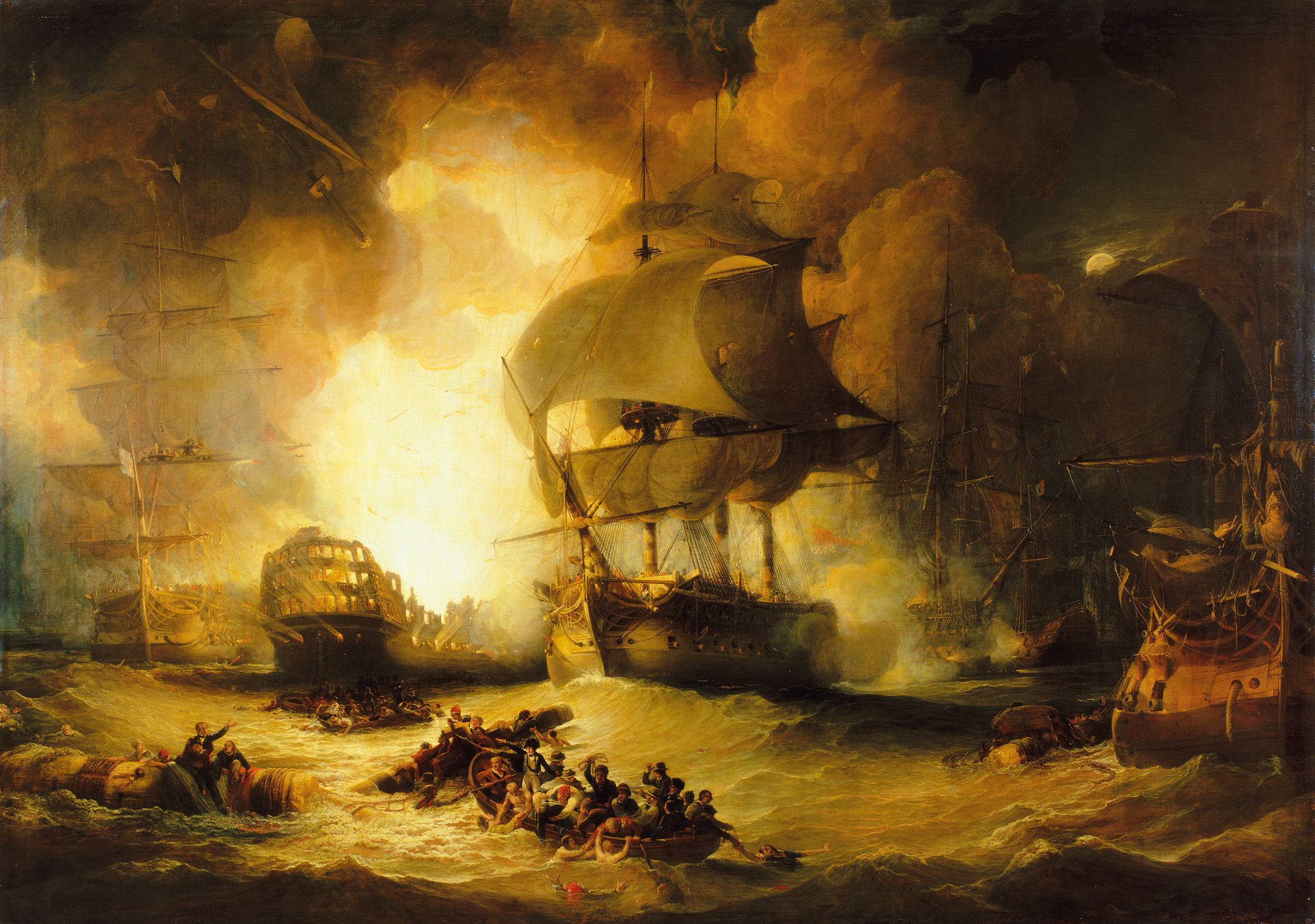
The French fleet is defeated by Admiral Nelson at the Battle of the Nile (August 1, 1798)
- January 5: The French legislature passes a law authorizing a loan of eighty million francs to prepare an invasion of England.
- January 11: The Directory orders General Berthier and his army to march on Rome to punish the papal government for the murder of General Duphot.
- January 12: Bonaparte presents a plan for an invasion of England to the Directory.
- January 18: The legislature authorizes French ships to seize neutral ships carrying British merchandise.
- January 24: The Vaud region of Switzerland, with French support, declares independence from the Swiss government in Bern.
- January 26: The Directory authorizes French troops to intervene on behalf of the Swiss uprising in Vaud against the Swiss government.
- February 10: Berthier and his army enter Rome.
- February 14: Talleyrand presents to the Directory a project for a French conquest of Egypt.
- February 15: General Berthier, in Rome, proclaims a new Roman Republic, under French protection.
- February 23: Bonaparte recommends to the Directory the abandonment of the invasion of England, and an invasion of Egypt instead.
- March 5: The Directory approves Bonaparte's plan to invade Egypt.
- March 6: The French army captures Bern.
- March 9: The Parliament of German states, meeting in Rastadt, accepts the annexation of the left bank of the Rhine by France.
- March 22: Under the sponsorship of General Brune, an assembly in Aarau proclaims a Helvetic Republic.
- April 4: Following the French model, the new Helvetic Republic declares itself a secular republic.
- April 9–18: Elections for one-third of the seats in the French legislature.
- April 26: The Traité de Réunion formally unites the Republic of Geneva (fr) with the French Republic.
- May 7: A report to the Council of Five Hundred declares that the French elections were irregular, and recommends exclusion of candidates of the far left.
- May 11: By the Law of 22 Floréal Year VI, the Council of Ancients and the Council of Five Hundred invalidate the election of 106 Jacobin deputies.
- May 15: Jean Baptiste Treilhard is elected to the Directory in place of François de Neufchâteau.
- May 19: Bonaparte and his Armée d'Orient set sail from Toulon for Egypt.
- May 23: Anti-British uprising begins in Ireland; the Irish rebels believe that Bonaparte is sailing to Ireland.
- June 9–11: Bonaparte invades and captures Malta.
- July 1–2: Bonaparte lands in Egypt and captures Alexandria.
- July 14: Irish uprising suppressed by the British.
- July 21: Bonaparte defeats the Mameluks at the Battle of the Pyramids.
- July 24: Bonaparte and his army enter Cairo.
- August 1: A British fleet under Horatio Nelson destroy the French fleet at the Battle of the Nile, stranding Bonaparte in Egypt.
- August 6: A French fleet and expeditionary force sails for Ireland to aid the Irish rebels, though the rebellion is already defeated.
- August 22: French troops under General Humbert land at Killala, in northwest Ireland.
- August 27: General Humbert defeats a British force at the Battle of Castlebar, and declares an Irish republic.
- September 2: Suppression of a royalist revolt in the south of the Massif Central in France and the arrest of its leaders.
- September 5: The Jourdan law requires all French men between twenty and twenty-five to perform military service.
- September 9: The forces of General Humbert are defeated by the British army at the Battle of Ballinamuck and forced to surrender.
- September 16: A new French expeditionary force sails from Brest to Ireland.
- September 24: The French government calls 200,000 men for military service.
- October 8: François de Neufchâteau, Minister of the Interior, creates the first Higher Council on Public Education.
- October 11: French fleet and expeditionary force defeated off coast of Ireland; six of eight warships captured.
- October 12: Belgian peasants rebel against obligatory service in French army.
- October 21: Population of Cairo rebels against French occupation. Rebellion suppressed by Bonaparte on October 22.
- November 4: Directory orders deportation of Belgian priests, blamed for peasant uprising.
- November 5: A Russian-Turkish fleet blockades Corfu occupied by the French army.
- November 16: Austria and England agree to cooperate to force France back to its 1789 boundaries.
- November 23–24: Directory, desperate for money, imposes new real estate tax and additional taxes based on number of doors and windows.
- November 27: The army of the King of Naples captures Rome.
- December 4: French troops defeat Belgian rebels at Hasselt and massacre insurgents. End of peasant uprising in Belgium.
- December 6: French army under Jean Étienne Championnet defeats the army of the King of Naples and his wife at Battle of Civita Castellana.
- December 14: French army under Championnet recaptures Rome.
- December 21: French army attacks Naples and forces King of Naples to take sanctuary on the flagship of Admiral Nelson.
- December 29: Alliance (Second Coalition) between Russia, Britain and the Kingdoms of Naples and Sicily against France signed.

== 1799 – France at War in Italy and Germany; Bonaparte returns from Egypt; the Consulate seizes power; End of the Revolution ==
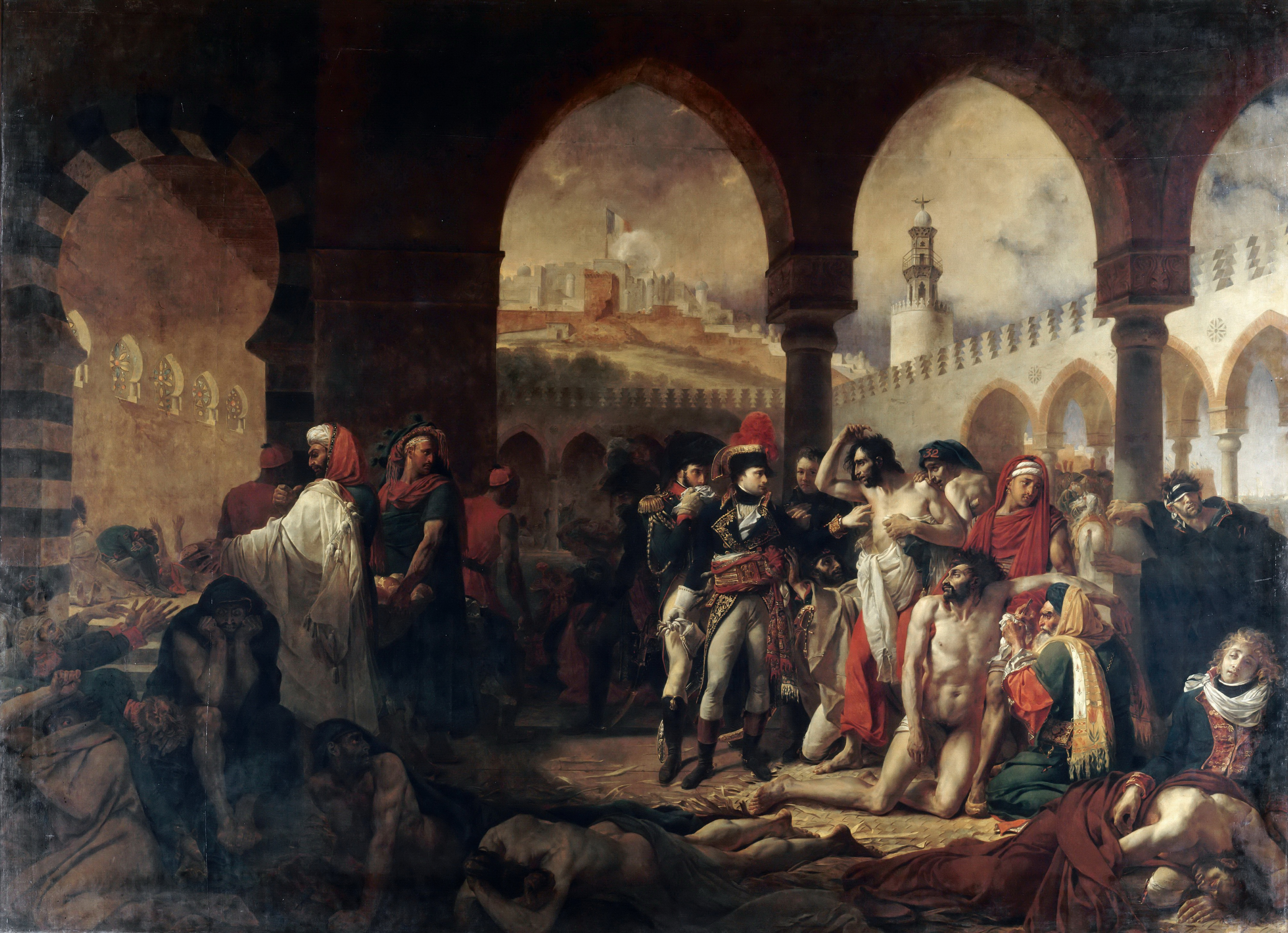
General Bonaparte visits a plague hospital in Jaffa (March 11, 1799). Antoine-Jean Gros, Louvre Museum

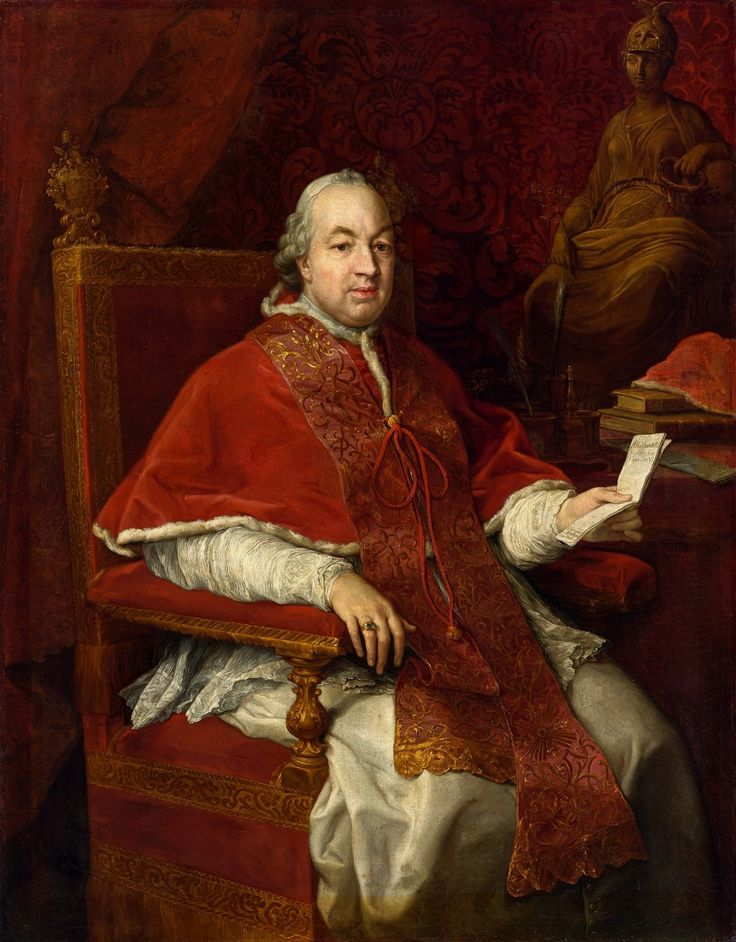
Pope Pius VI was moved to France as a prisoner of the Directory (April 10, 1799)

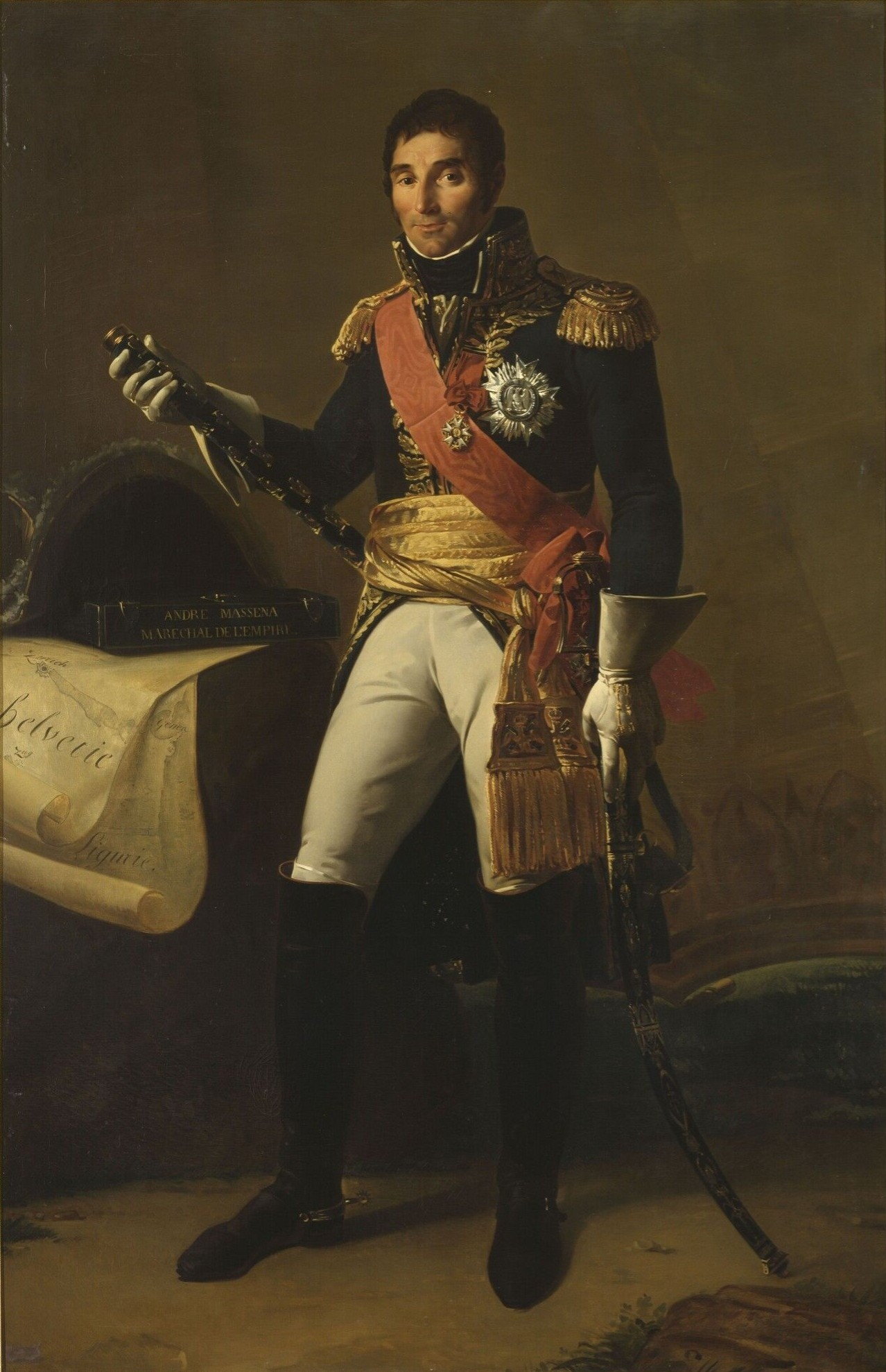
General André Masséna forced the Russians out of Switzerland (September 26, 1799)
- January 10: The army of General Championnet captures Capua.
- January 23: French army occupies Naples
- January 26: Proclamation of a new republic in Naples, named Parthénopéenne by the Directory
- February 1: Victory of General Louis Desaix over the Mameluks at Aswan completes the French conquest of upper Egypt.
- February 3: Conflict between Generals Championnet and Faipoult over the command of French troops in Naples.
- February 6: Championnet orders the expulsion of Faipoult from Naples.
- February 20: Bonaparte marches his army from Cairo toward Syria.
- February 20: Bonaparte defeats a Turkish army and occupies Arish in the Sinai Peninsula.
- February 24: The Directory orders the arrest of General Championnet.
- February 24: General Jean-Baptiste Jourdan assembles the Army of the Danube and prepares to cross the Rhine and invade German states and Austria.
- March 1–2: French armies under Jourdan and Bernadotte cross the Rhine.
- March 3: French troops in Corfu surrender, after a long siege by a Russian-Turkish fleet.
- March 7: Bonaparte captures Jaffa in Palestine. Some of his soldiers are infected with the plague.
- March 11: Bonaparte visits the hospital for plague victims in Jaffa.
- March 12: The Directory declares war on Austria and on the Grand Duchy of Tuscany.
- March 19: Bonaparte lays siege to Saint-Jean-d'Acre in Palestine.
- March 21: French troops enter the Grand Duchy of Tuscany.
- March 23: Army of General Massena defeated by Austrians at Battle of Feldkirch.
- March 25: Defeat of Jourdan by Austrians at Battle of Stockach.
- March 28: Bonaparte tries unsuccessfully to capture Saint-Jean-d'Acre.
- April 1: Bonaparte fails again to take Saint-Jean-d'Acre.
- April 3: Jourdan resigns as commander of the Army of the Danube. His army pulls back to the west bank of the Rhine on April 6.
- April 9: Beginning of legislative elections to replace one-third of members.
- April 10: Pope Pius VI, a prisoner of the French, is transferred to France.
- April 14: The Austrian army of Melas and the Russian army of Alexander Suvorov join in Italy.
- April 16: Bonaparte defeats the Ottoman army led by Abdullah Pasha al-Azm at the Battle of Mount Tabor.
- April 18: 1799 French legislative election results in a major loss for supporters of the government, and a victory for the extreme left.
- April 24: Bonaparte fails a third time to capture Saint-Jean-d'Acre.
- April 27: Alexander Suvorov's Russo-Austrian army defeats French forces under General Moreau at the Battle of Cassano.
- April 29: Suvorov enters Milan.
- May 1: Bonaparte fails for a fourth time to capture Saint-Jean-d'Acre.
- May 10: Fifth and last attempt by Bonaparte to capture Saint-Jean-d'Acre. He lifts the siege on May 17.
- May 16: As the result of the system of drawing lots, Rewbell leaves the Directory and is replaced by Sieyès, who is seen as a moderate leftist.
- May 19: An English fleet lands soldiers at Ostend in Belgium. The expedition fails, and withdraws the following day.
- May 26: Russo-Austrian army enters Turin.
- June 4–6: Masséna is forced to withdraw his forces from Zürich.
- June 14: Bonaparte returns to Cairo.

=== Conflicts between the Directory and the Legislature (June 1799) ===
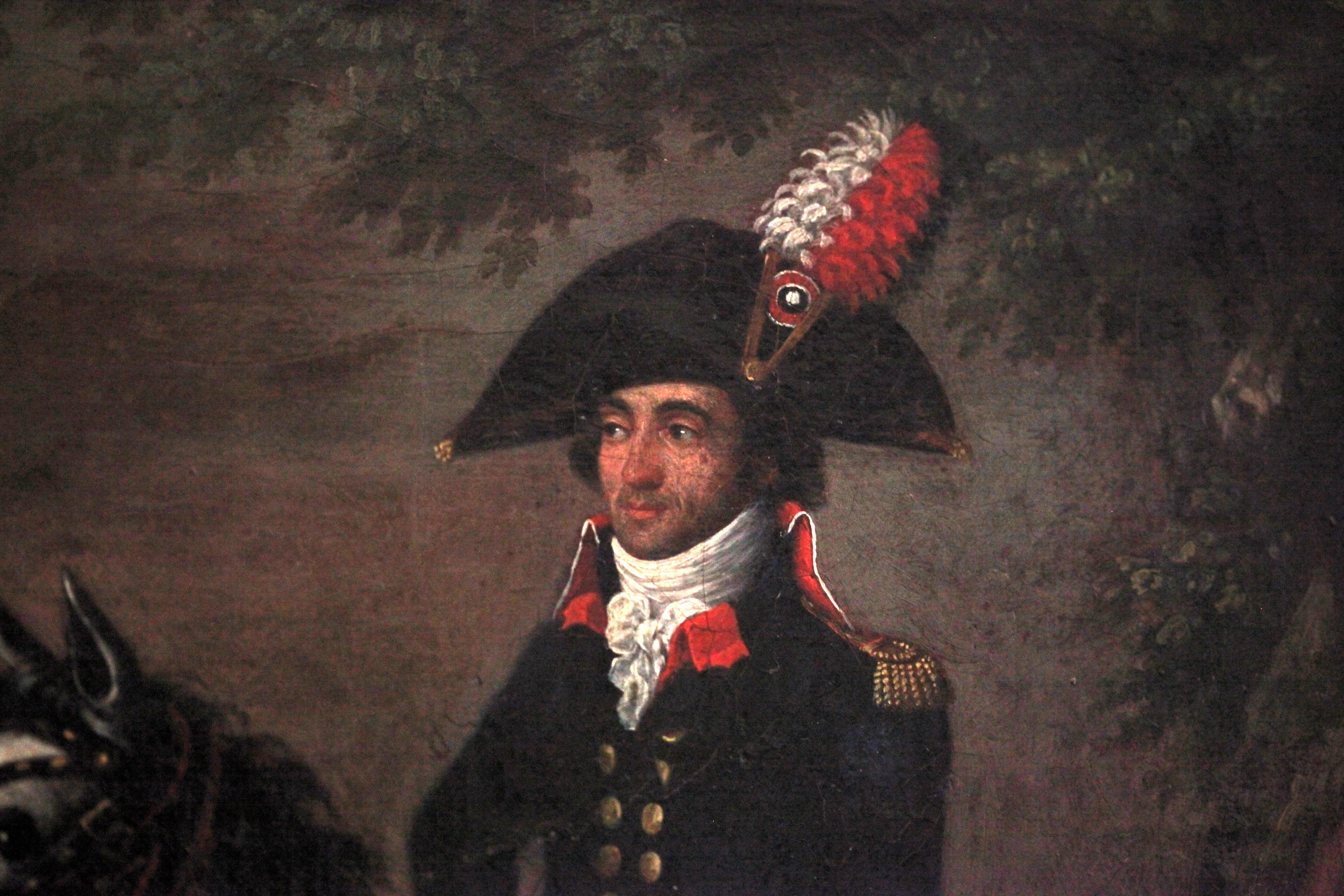
General Jourdan, leader of the Jacobins in the army

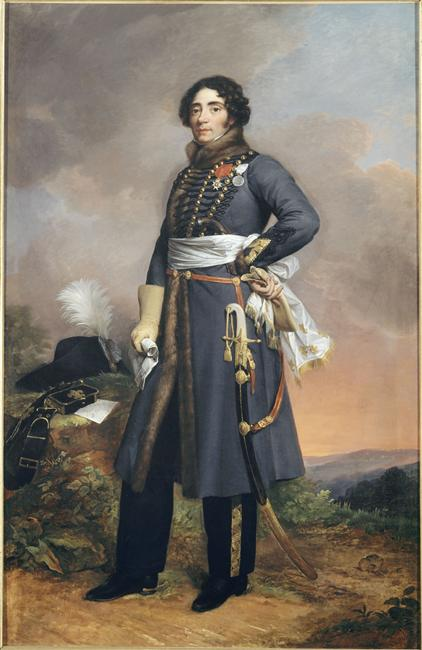
The royalist general Louis de Frotté commanded a new rebellion against Paris in the west of France

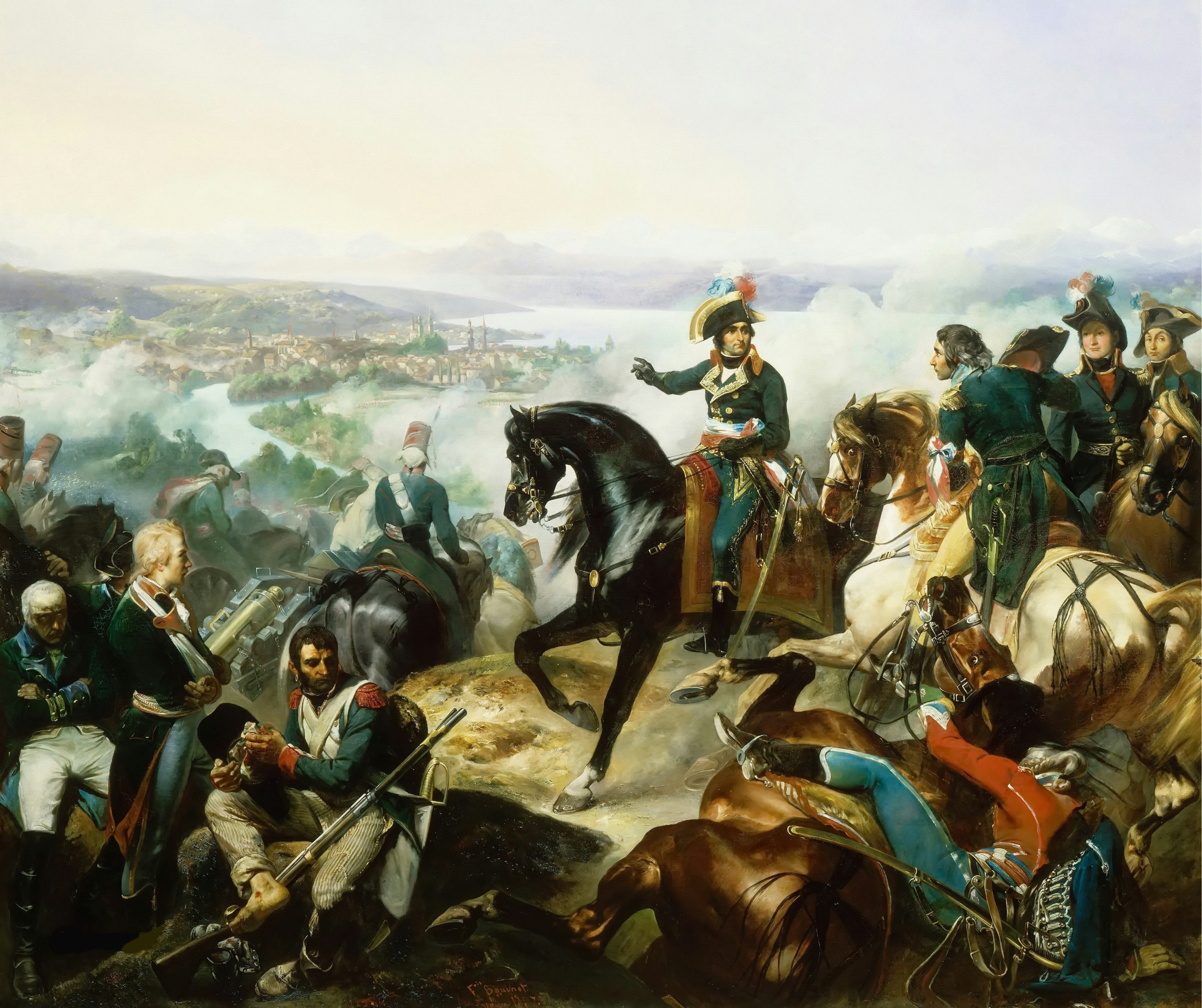
The French army under General Masséna wins a decisive victory over the Austrians and Russians at the Second Battle of Zürich (September 24–25, 1799)

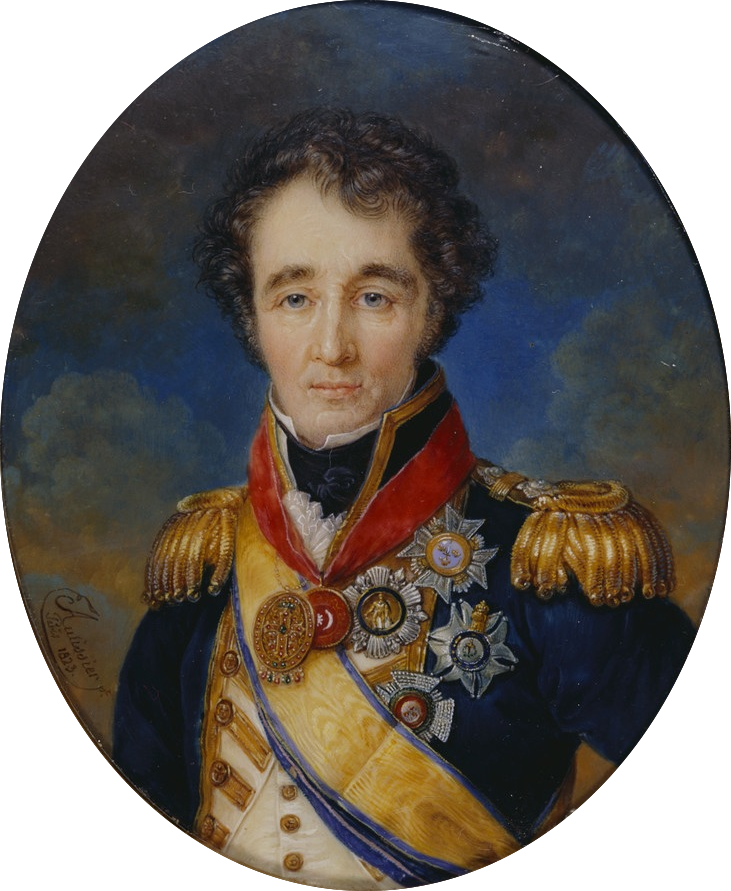
The British Admiral Sir Sidney Smith sends Bonaparte a packet of French newspapers, letting him know of events in Paris. Bonaparte promptly leaves his army in Egypt and sails for France. (August 23, 1799)
- June 16: A serious struggle begins between the newly elected left-wing members of the Council of Five Hundred and the Directory, due to the string of French military defeats. The legislature demands new measures for "public safety".
- June 17: The Council of Five Hundred and Council of the Ancients annul the election of Jean Baptiste Treilhard to the Directory and replace him with a leftist member, Louis-Jérôme Gohier.
- June 18–19: Two royalist members of the Directory, Philippe-Antoine Merlin de Douai and La Révellière-Lépeaux, are forced to resign, under threat of being brought to trial by the Councils. They are replaced by two moderate leftists, Roger Ducos, and Jean-François-Auguste Moulin. (Coup of 30 Prairial Year VII )
- June 19: A French army under Étienne Macdonald is defeated by the Russians under Suvorov at the Battle of the Trebia.
- June 19: Another reversal in Italy: the French garrison of Naples surrenders.
- June 28: The Council votes to demand a forced loan of one hundred million francs from wealthy citizens to equip new armies.
- July 5: Two commanders with neo-Jacobin sympathies are promoted by the Directory: Joubert is named new commander of the Army of Italy, and Championnet is chosen to command the Army of the Alps.
- July 7: A neo-Jacobin club, the Société des amis de la Liberté et de l'Égalité ("Society of the Friends of Liberty and Equality"), is founded in Paris.
- July 12: The Council of Five Hundred votes a new law on hostages, demands lists of royalists be made in each department, and brings accusations against former members of the Directory with royalist tendencies.
- July 14: At a celebration of the anniversary of the Revolution, General Jourdan calls "bringing back the pikes", the weapons of the Jacobin street mobs during the Terror. On the same day, Siéyès gives a speech denouncing the new Jacobins.
- July 17: An Ottoman army under the command of Seid Mustafa Pasha, transported to Egypt by Sidney Smith's British fleet, lands at Abukir.
- July 25: Bonaparte defeats Seid Mustafa Pasha's Ottoman army at the Battle of Abukir.
- August 6: Royalist uprisings in Toulouse and Bordeaux. Both are quickly suppressed by the army.
- August 13: Sieyès orders the closing of the new Jacobin Club in Paris.
- August 15: Defeat of the French Army of Italy under General Joubert at the Battle of Novi. Joubert is killed.
- August 18: The Council of Five Hundred decides, by a vote of 217–214, not to arrest and try the former members of the Directory accused of royalist sympathies.
- August 23: Bonaparte has had no news from France in six months. The British admiral Sir Sidney Smith sends him a packet of French newspapers, which he reads in one night. He hands over command of the army to General Kléber and leaves Egypt with a small party aboard the frigate La Muiron.
- August 29: Pope Pius VI dies, a French prisoner, in Valence.
- August 29: Championnet, prominent among the Jacobin generals, is named new commander of the Army of Italy.
- September 13: General Jourdan, leader of the Jacobins in the army, asks the Council of Five Hundred to declare a state of national emergency.
- September 14: Council of Five Hundred refuses to declare a state of national emergency.
- September 14: The Director Sieyès obtains the resignation of Jean Bernadotte as Minister of War, on the grounds that Bernadotte was planning a Jacobin coup d'état.
- September 15: The royalist leaders in the west of France, including the Breton Chouan leader Georges Cadoudal, meet to organize a new uprising against Paris.
- September 24: The royalist military commander Louis de Frotté lands in Normandy to take charge of the new uprising.
- September 25–26: General Masséna defeats the Russian-Austrian army of Alexander Rimsky-Korsakov at the Second Battle of Zurich.
- September 29: The Russian army under Suvorov is forced to retreat across the Alps.
- October 6: A French-Dutch army under General Brune defeats a Russian-British force at the Battle of Castricum. The British and Russians withdraw their troops from the Netherlands.

=== Bonaparte returns to France (October 9, 1799) ===
- October 9: Bonaparte lands at Saint-Raphaël.
- October 14: Sieyès invites General Moreau to organize a coup d'état against the Jacobins in the Councils, but Moreau refuses.
- October 16: Bonaparte arrives in Paris for public celebrations.
- October 17: Bonaparte is received by the Directory.
- October 19: The royalist forces in the west, the Chouans, capture Nantes, but are forced to withdraw the next day.
- October 23: The Russian Czar Paul I orders the withdrawal of Russian troops from the war against the French.
- October 23: Lucien Bonaparte, younger brother of General Napoléon Bonaparte, is elected President of the Council of Five Hundred.
- October 23–29: Royalist forces in Brittany and the Vendée briefly capture several cities, but are quickly driven out by the French army.
- November 1: Bonaparte meets with Sieyès; the two men dislike each other but agree to a parliamentary coup d'état to replace the Directory.
- November 3: Bonaparte meets with Fouché, the Minister of Police, who agrees not to interfere with a coup d'état.
- November 6: The Councils of the Ancients and the Five Hundred offer a banquet to Bonaparte at the former church of Saint Sulpice.
- November 7: General Jourdan proposes that Bonaparte join him in a Jacobin coup d'état against the Directory. Bonaparte refuses.
- November 8: Bonaparte dines with Cambacérès and arranges the final details of the coup d'état.

=== The Coup d'État of November 9–10 ===
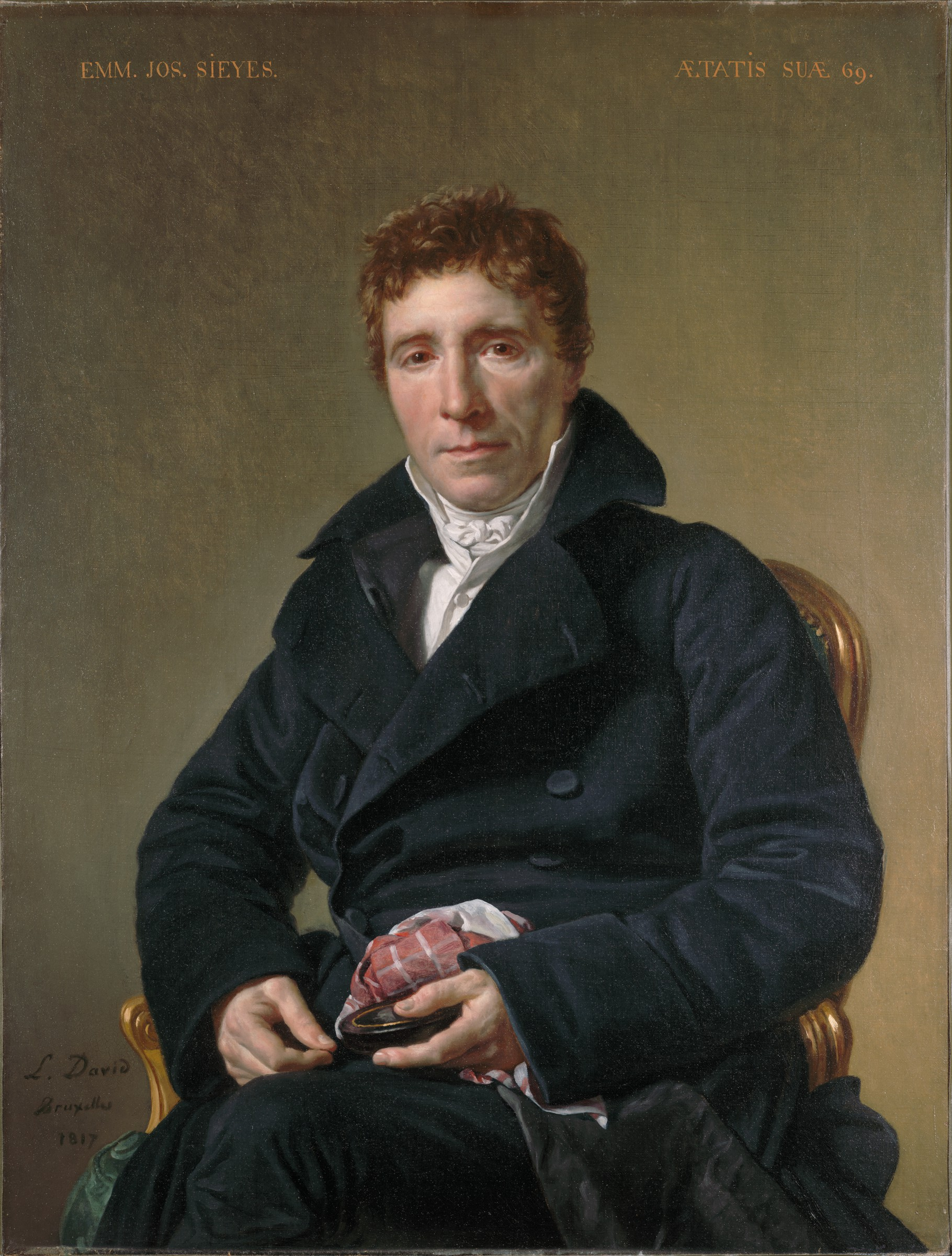
Emmanuel Joseph Sieyès proposed the coup d'état, but was left out of the final government

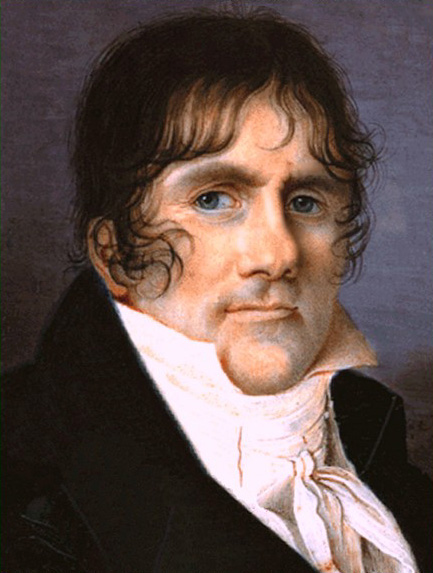
The Director Paul Barras was persuaded not to oppose Bonaparte's coup d'état

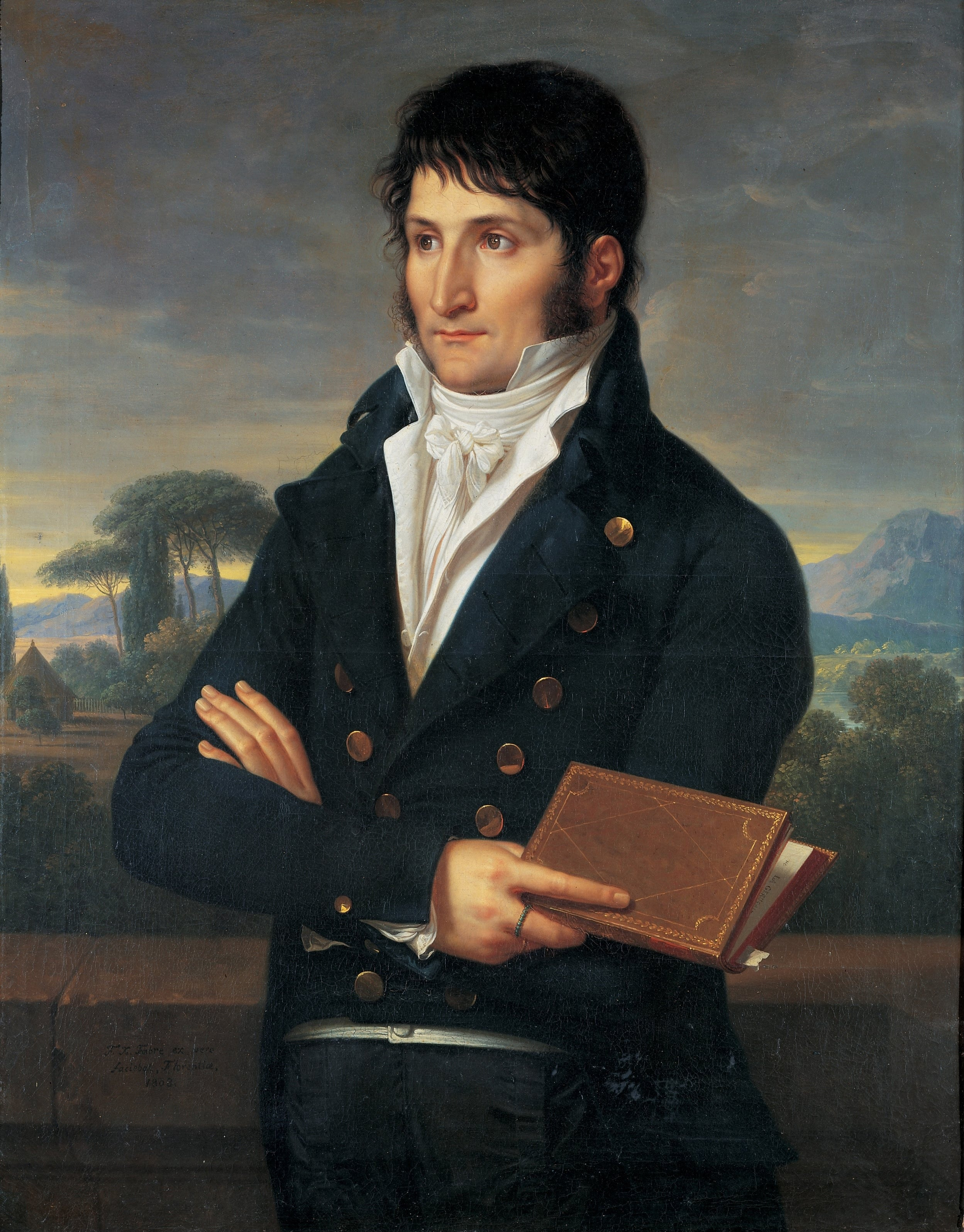
Lucien Bonaparte, 24 years old, was elected President of the Council of Five Hundred, and aided Bonaparte's coup d'état

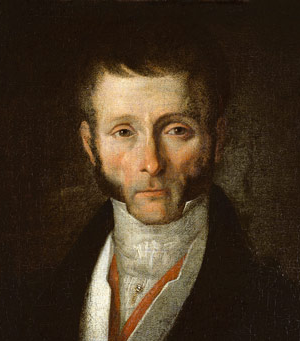
Joseph Fouché, Minister of Police, assured that the police would not interfere in Bonaparte's seizure of power

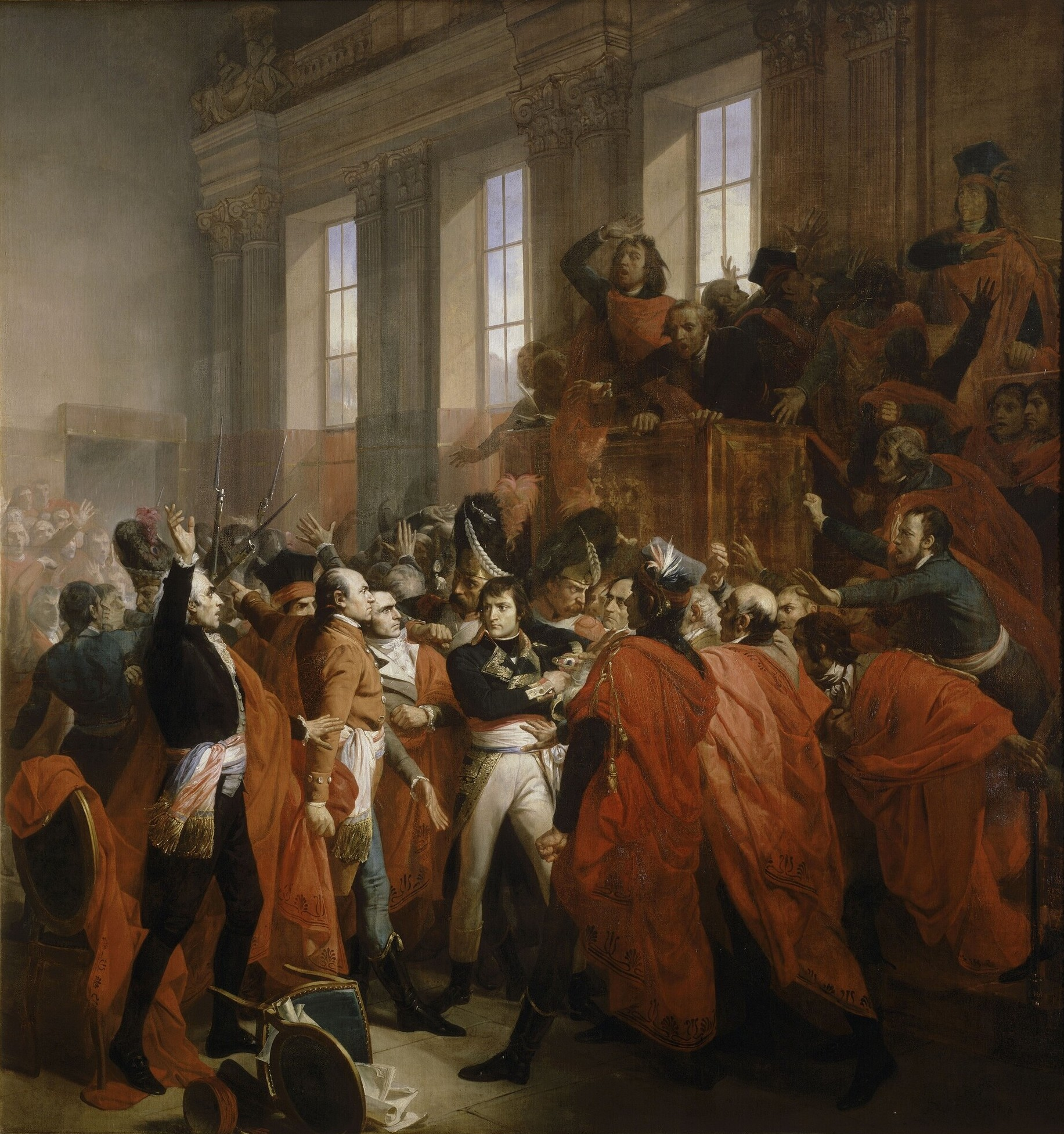
Bonaparte confronts the deputies of the Council of Five Hundred (November 10, 1799)

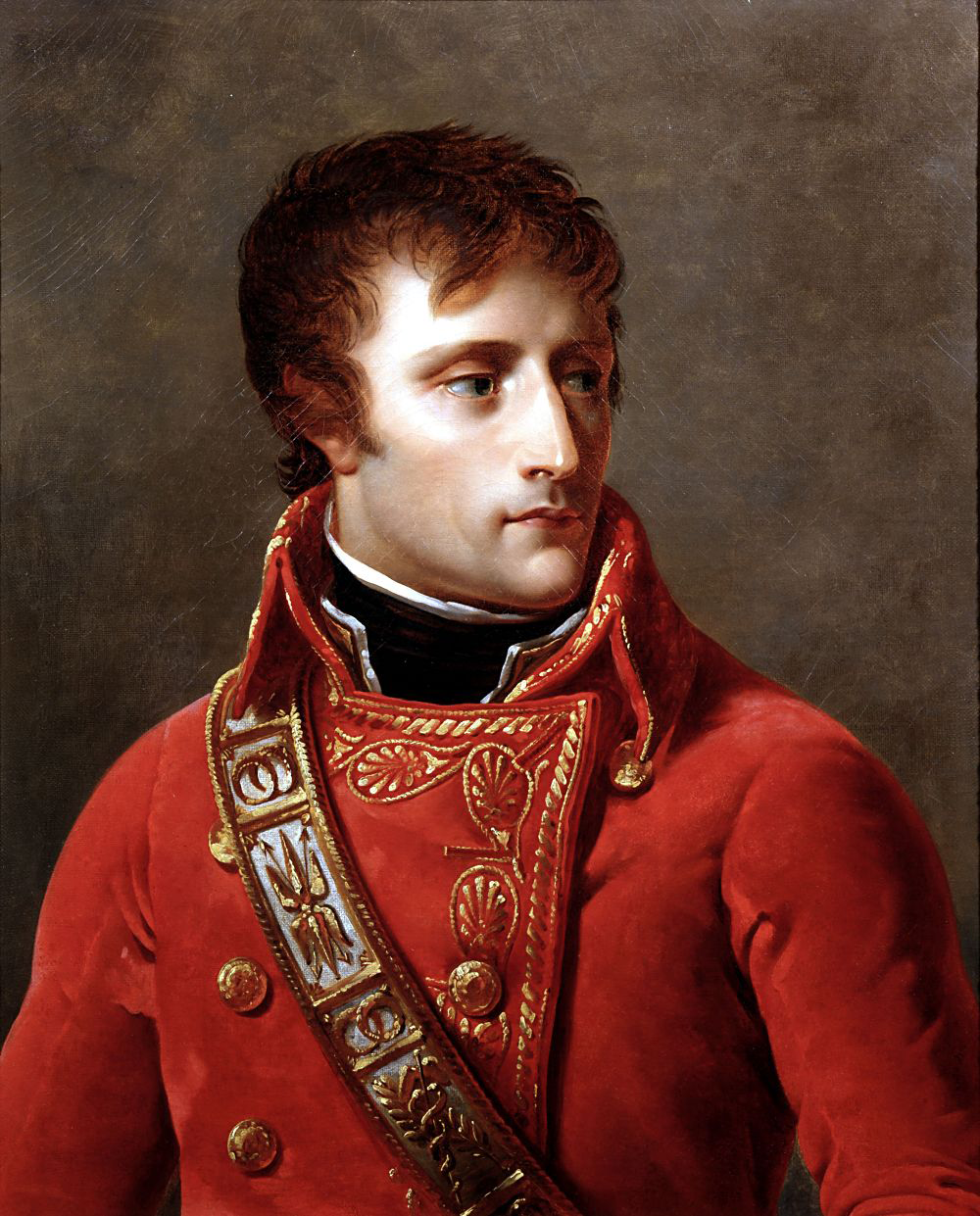
Bonaparte as First Consul (1804), by Antoine Gros, Musée de la Légion d'honneur, Paris
- November 9: The coup d'état of 18 Brumaire begins. French troops loyal to Bonaparte occupy key points in Paris. Lucien Bonaparte, the president of the Council of Five Hundred, warns the deputies that a "terrorist" plot against the legislature has been discovered, and asks that the meetings of the Councils, scheduled for the next day, be moved for their security to the château of Saint-Cloud, some 10 kilometers west of Paris. Bonaparte is named Commander-in-chief of the army in Paris.
- As agreed in advance, two members of the Directory who are complicit in the coup, Sieyès and Ducos, offer their resignation. A third, Barras, is talked into resigning by Talleyrand. The two Jacobin directors, Gohier and Moulin, are arrested by the soldiers of General Moreau and confined at the Luxembourg Palace. Fouché proposes to arrest the leading Jacobin members of the Council of Five Hundred, but Bonaparte does not feel it is necessary, which proves to be a mistake. By the end of the day, Paris is entirely under the control of Bonaparte and officers loyal to him.
- November 10: As proposed by Bonaparte, the members of the two Councils are transported to the château of Saint-Cloud. 6,000 soldiers have been assembled by Bonaparte there, soldiers who are largely hostile to the Councils because of delays in their pay.
- Bonaparte speaks first to the Council of the Ancients, explaining the need for a change in government. The upper Council listens in silence and votes without opposition to accept Bonaparte's proposal. Bonaparte then addresses the Council of Five Hundred, meeting in the orangerie of the domain of Saint-Cloud. Here his reception is much different: the Jacobin members protest angrily, insult and shout down Bonaparte, threatening to declare him outside the law, which would have led to his immediate arrest. While the Council debated in great confusion inside, Lucien Bonaparte takes Bonaparte outside, and tells the waiting soldiers that the deputies had tried to assassinate Bonaparte. The soldiers, furious, invade the meeting hall and chase out the deputies at the point of bayonets. In the absence of the opposition deputies, two parliamentary commissions name Bonaparte, Sieyès and Duclos as the provisional consuls of a new government.
- November 11–22: Bonaparte and the two other Provisional Consuls form a new government, Berthier as minister of War, Talleyrand in charge of foreign relations, Fouché as minister of Police, and Cambacérès as minister of Justice.
- December 1: Bonaparte rejects a constitution proposed by Sieyès.
- December 24: The Councils, now firmly under the control of Bonaparte, adopt the Constitution of the Year VIII. The new Consulate is formally established, with Bonaparte as First Consul, Cambacérès as Second Consul, and Charles-François Lebrun as Third Consul. Traditional histories mark this date as the end of the French Revolution .

== See also ==
- List of battles of the War of the First Coalition
- Timeline of the Napoleonic era
- Musée de la Révolution française
