= The Tennis Court Oath (disambiguation) =

The Tennis Court Oath is an event in the French Revolution.

The Tennis Court Oath may also refer to:

- The Tennis Court Oath (poetry collection), a 1962 book by John Ashbery
- The Tennis Court Oath (David), an incomplete painting by Jacques-Louis David

== See also ==
- Tennis court (disambiguation)
