= Salon of 1848 =

1848 art exhibition in Paris

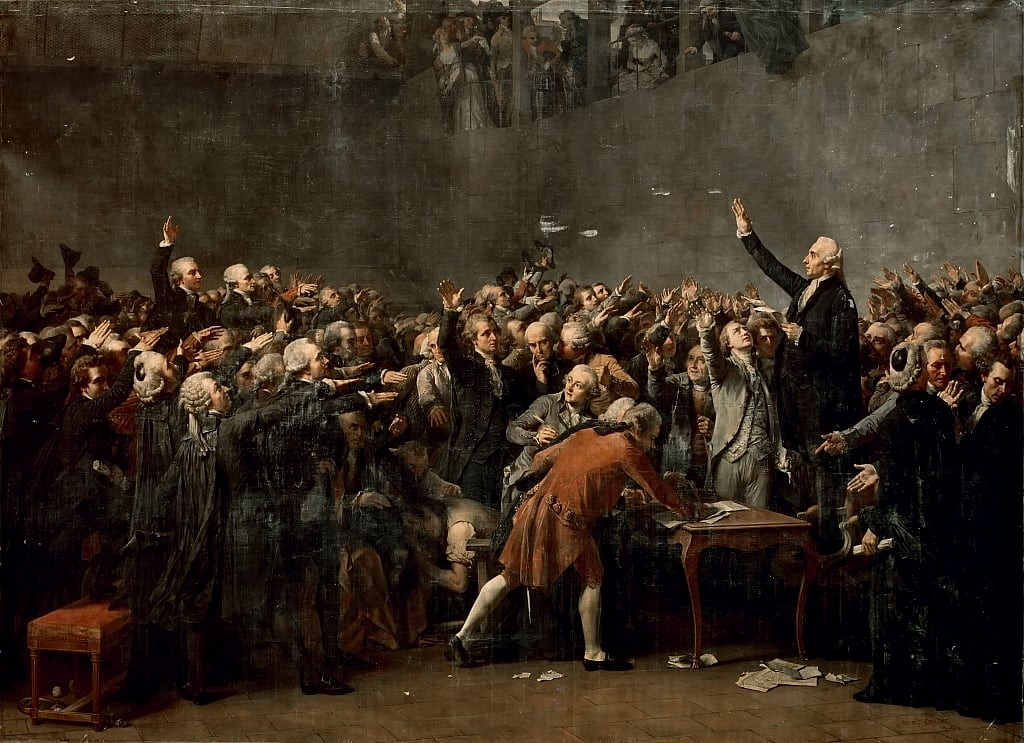
The Tennis Court Oath by Auguste Couder

The Salon of 1848 was an art exhibition held at the Louvre in Paris between 30 March and 20 June 1848. It was the first Salon to be held during the Second Republic that followed overthrow of the July Monarchy of Louis Philippe I during the French Revolution of 1848 in February. The organisers chose to permit all entries to be displayed, a unique event in the history of the Salon.

Auguste Couder exhibited the history painting The Tennis Court Oath which drew inspiration from an unfinished work of the same title by Jacques-Louis David. Gustave Courbet submitted seven pictures to the exhibition. It marked a breakthrough for him with public acclaim and the award of a gold medal. Courbet described the self-portrait of himself as a cellist as having been rejected by the Salon of 1847 but then accepted for this edition, although it does not appear in the catalogue. The leading Romantic painter Eugène Delacroix enjoyed success with The Death of Valentin and the religious Christ at the Tomb.

== Gallery ==
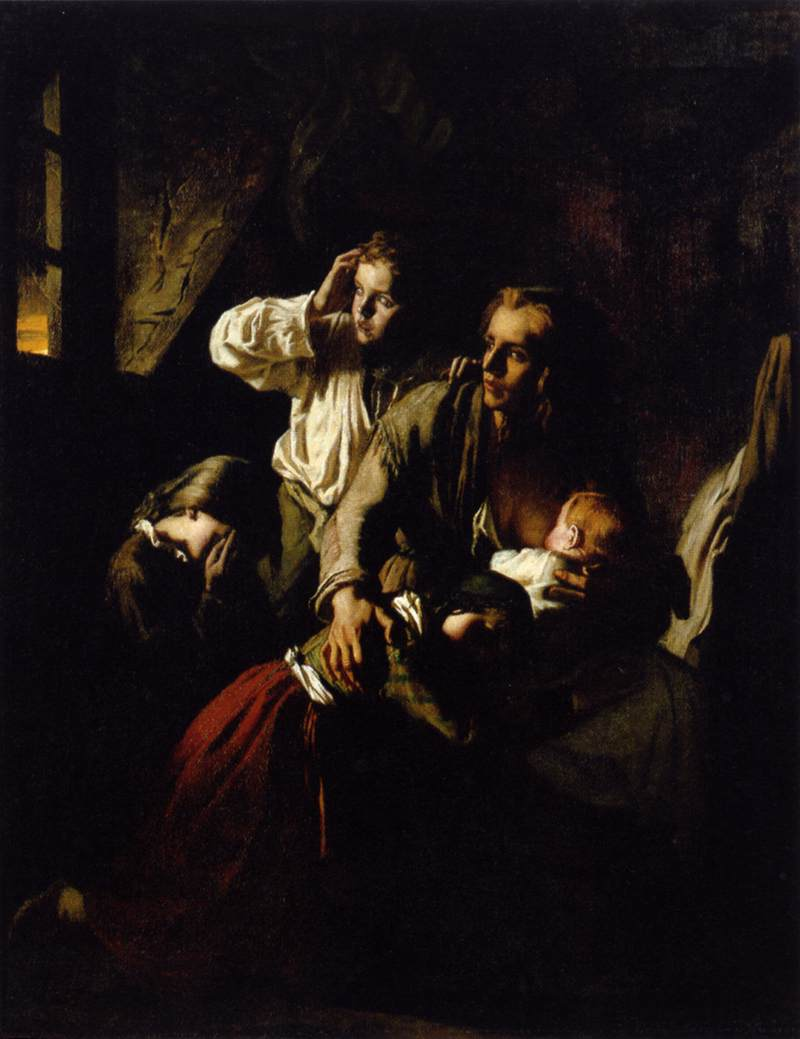
The Lightning by Alexandre Antigna

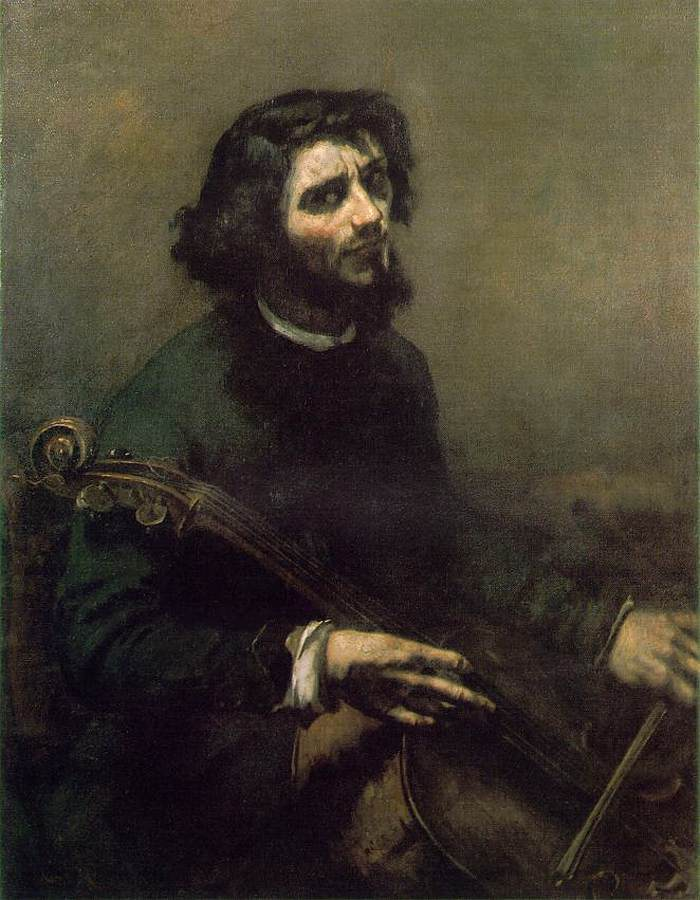
Self-Portrait (The Cellist) by Gustave Courbet

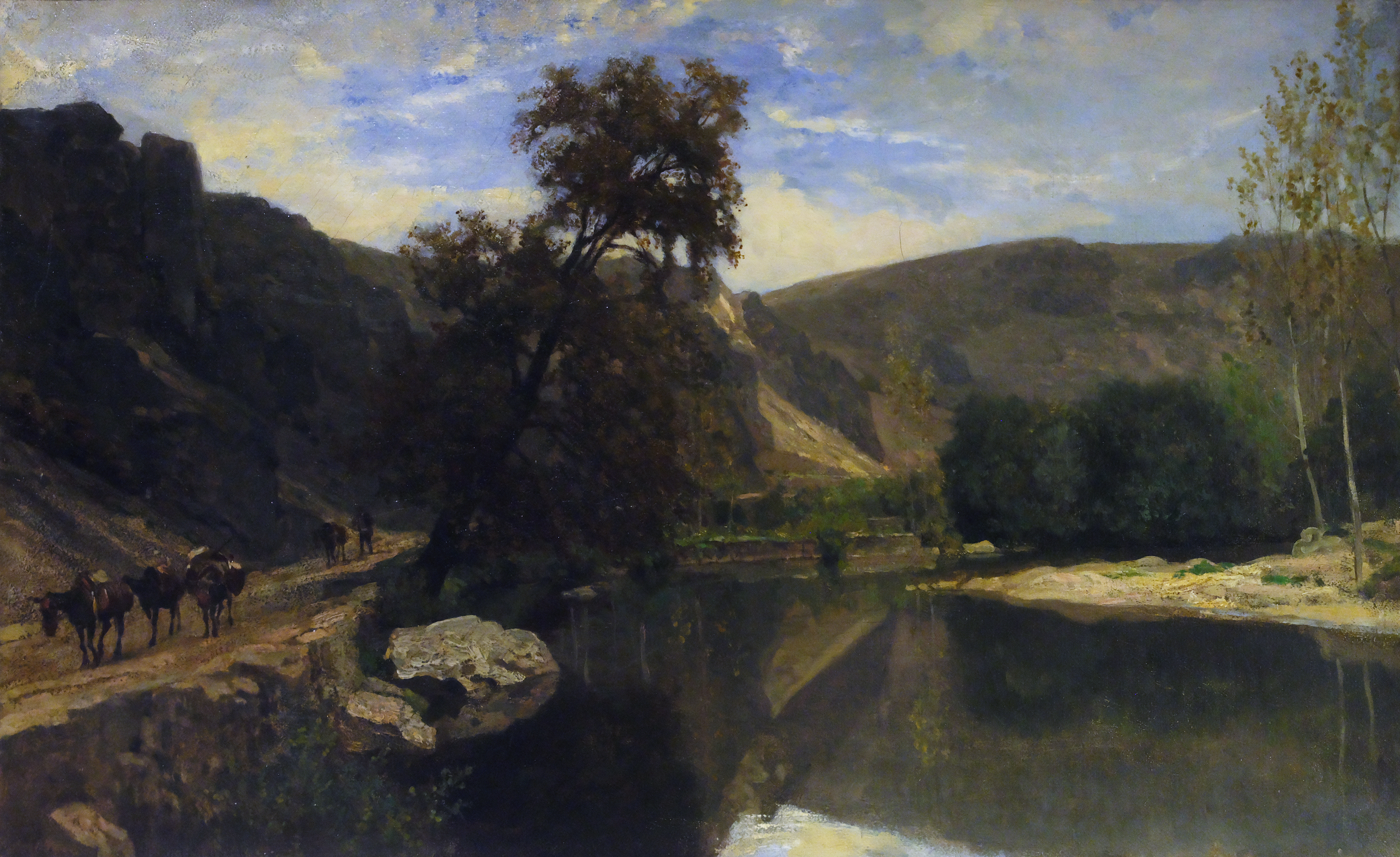
The River Cousin, Near Avallon by Charles-François Daubigny

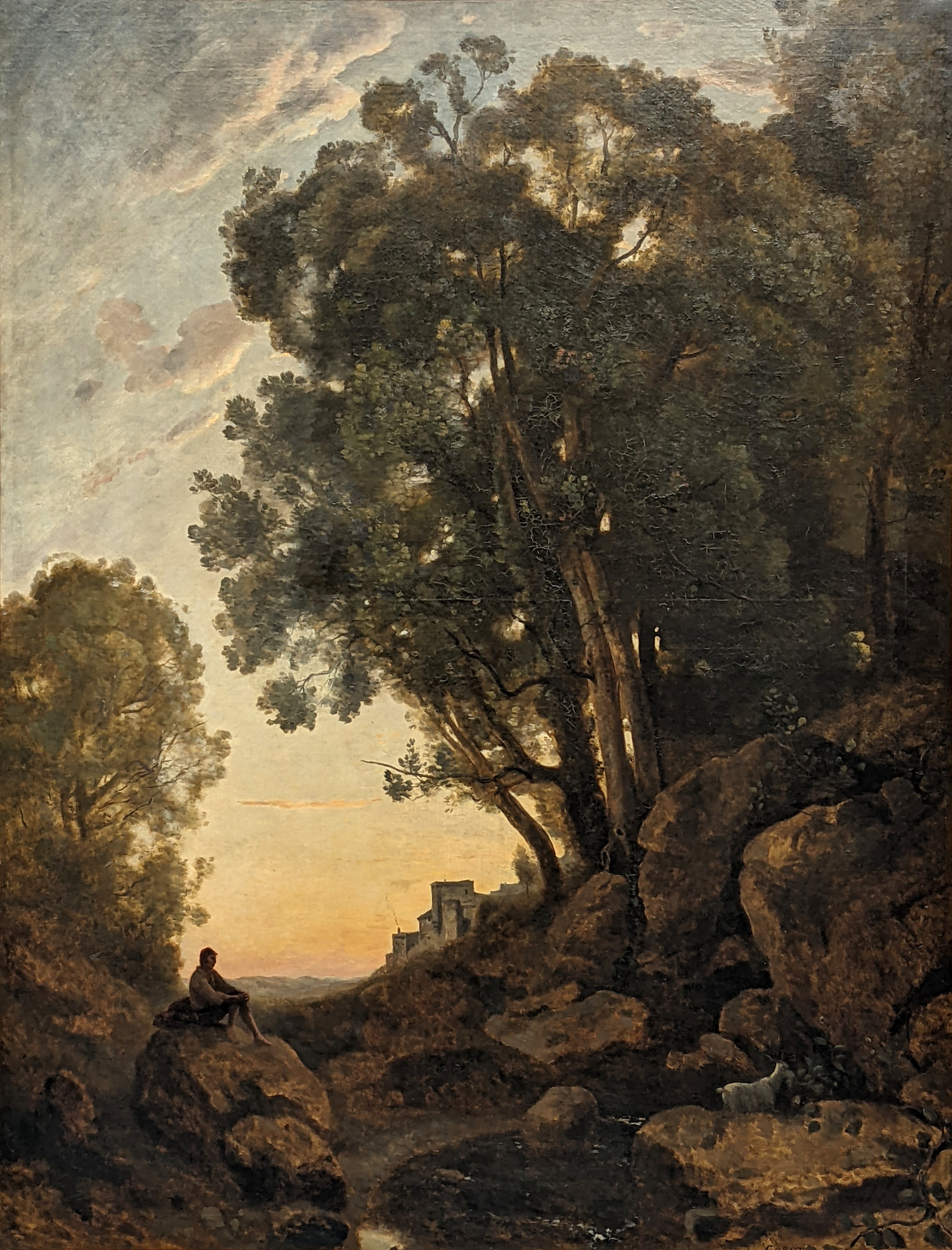
Sunset in Chevrier by Jean-Baptiste-Camille Corot

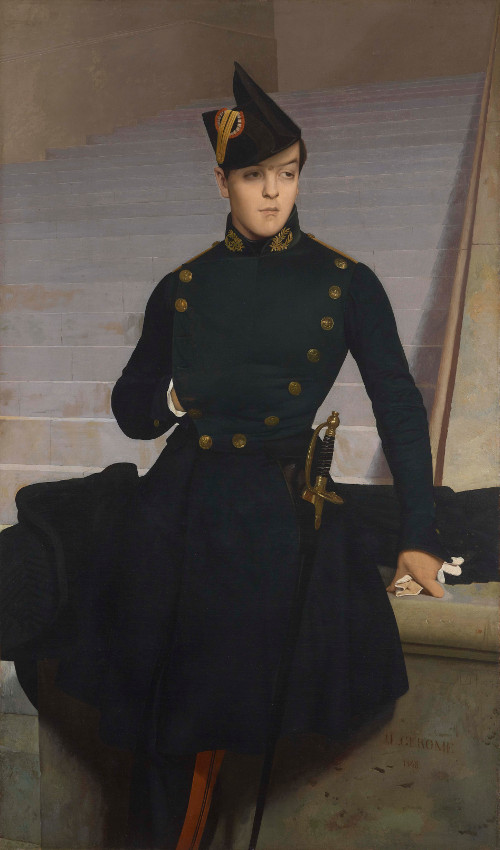
Portrait of Claude-Armand Gérôme by Jean-Léon Gérôme

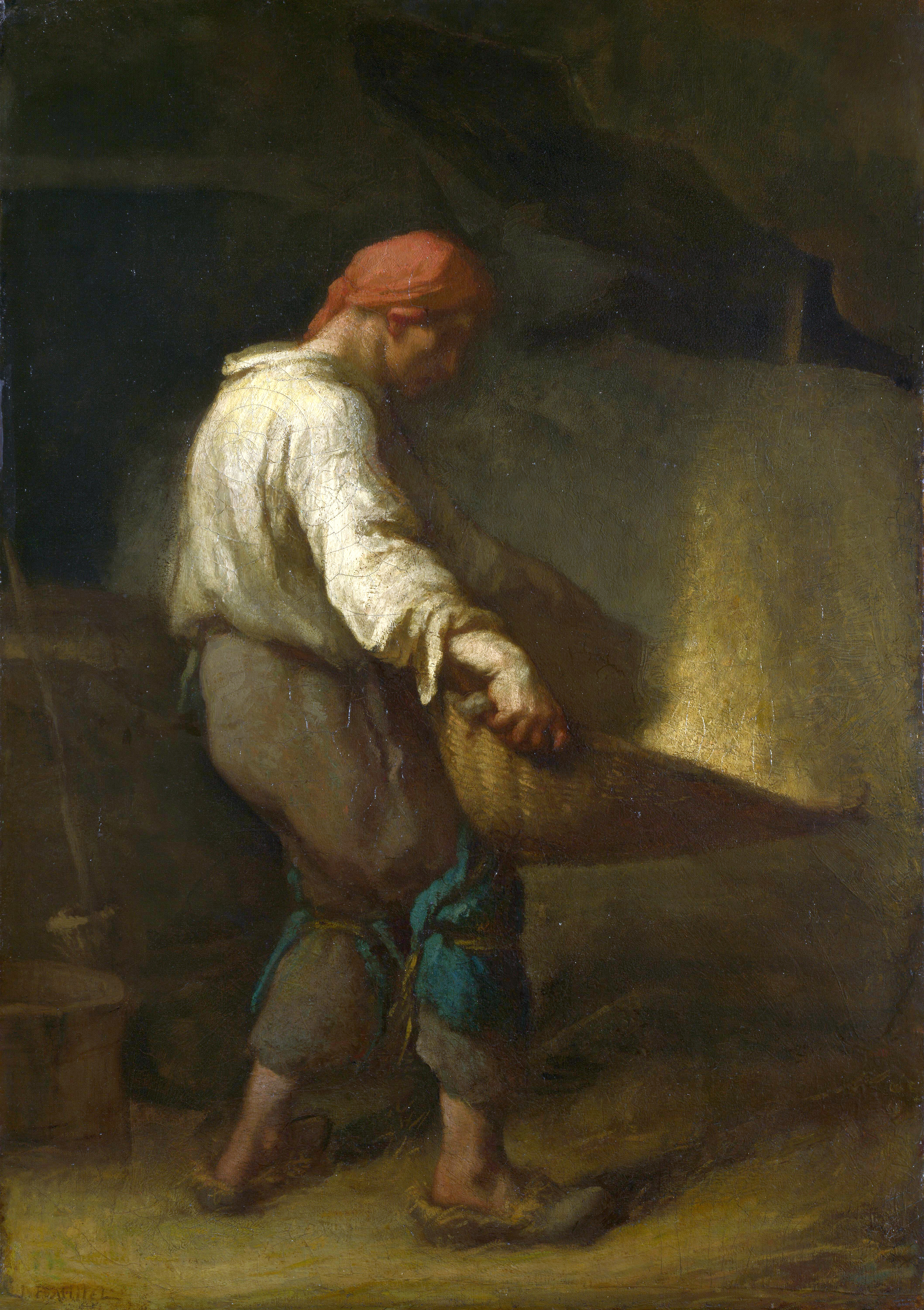
The Winnower by Jean-François Millet

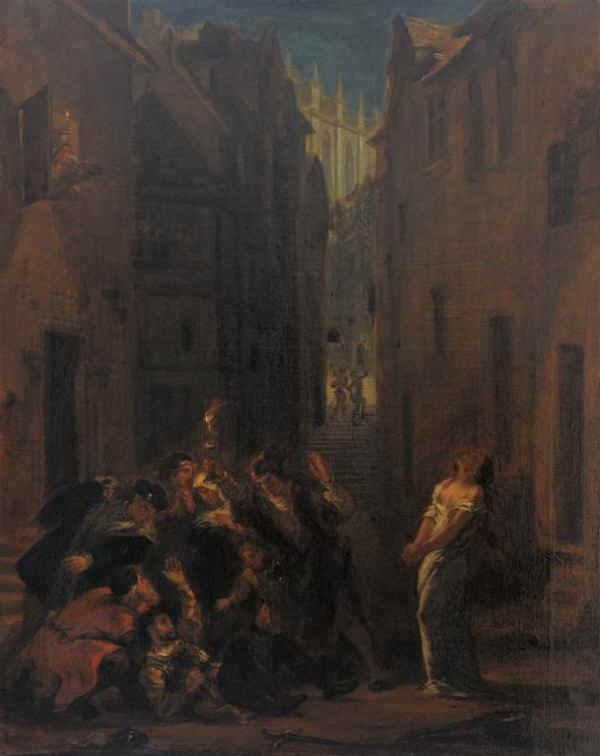
The Death of Valentin by Eugène Delacroix

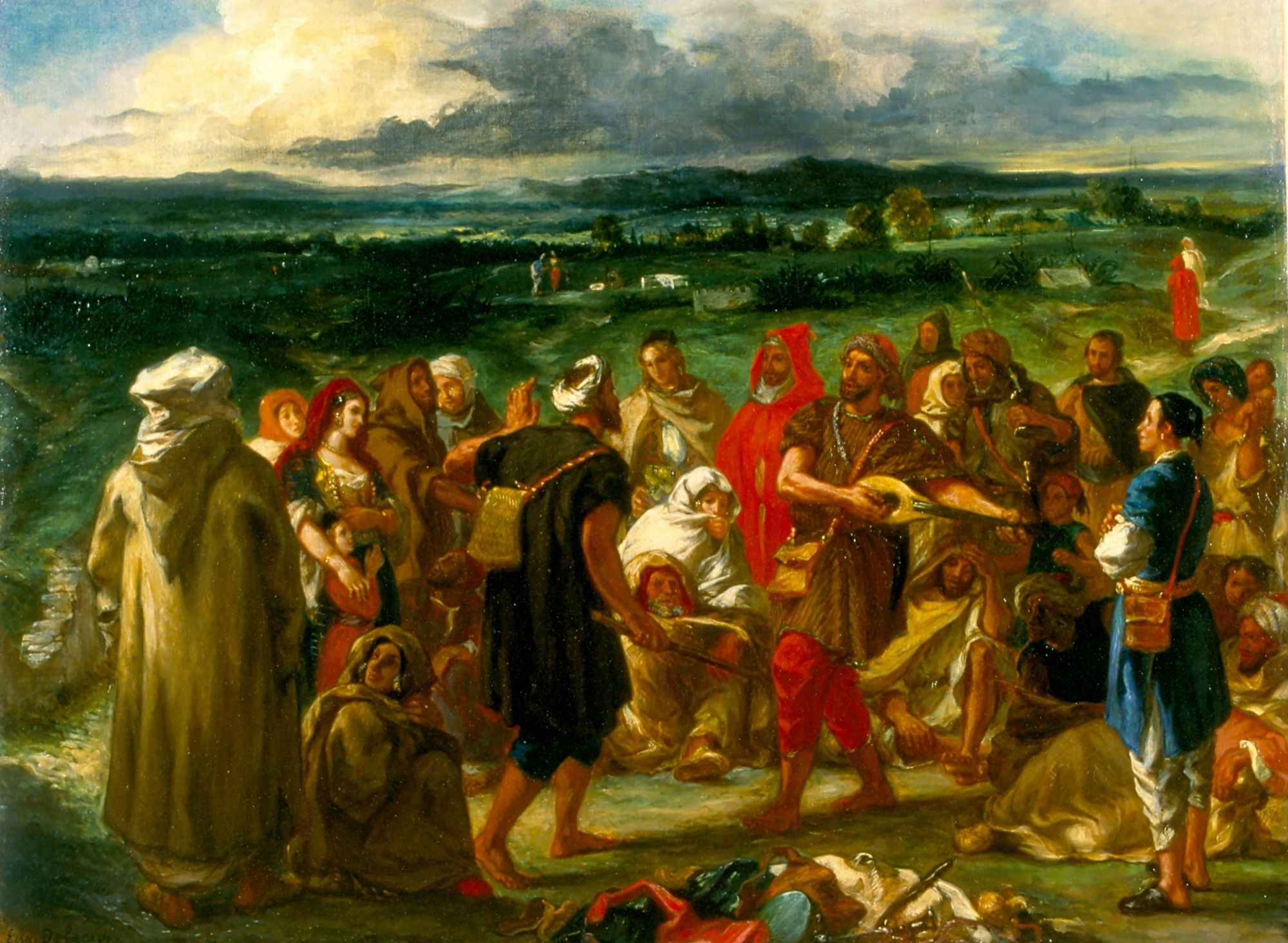
Comédiens ou bouffons arabes by Eugène Delacroix

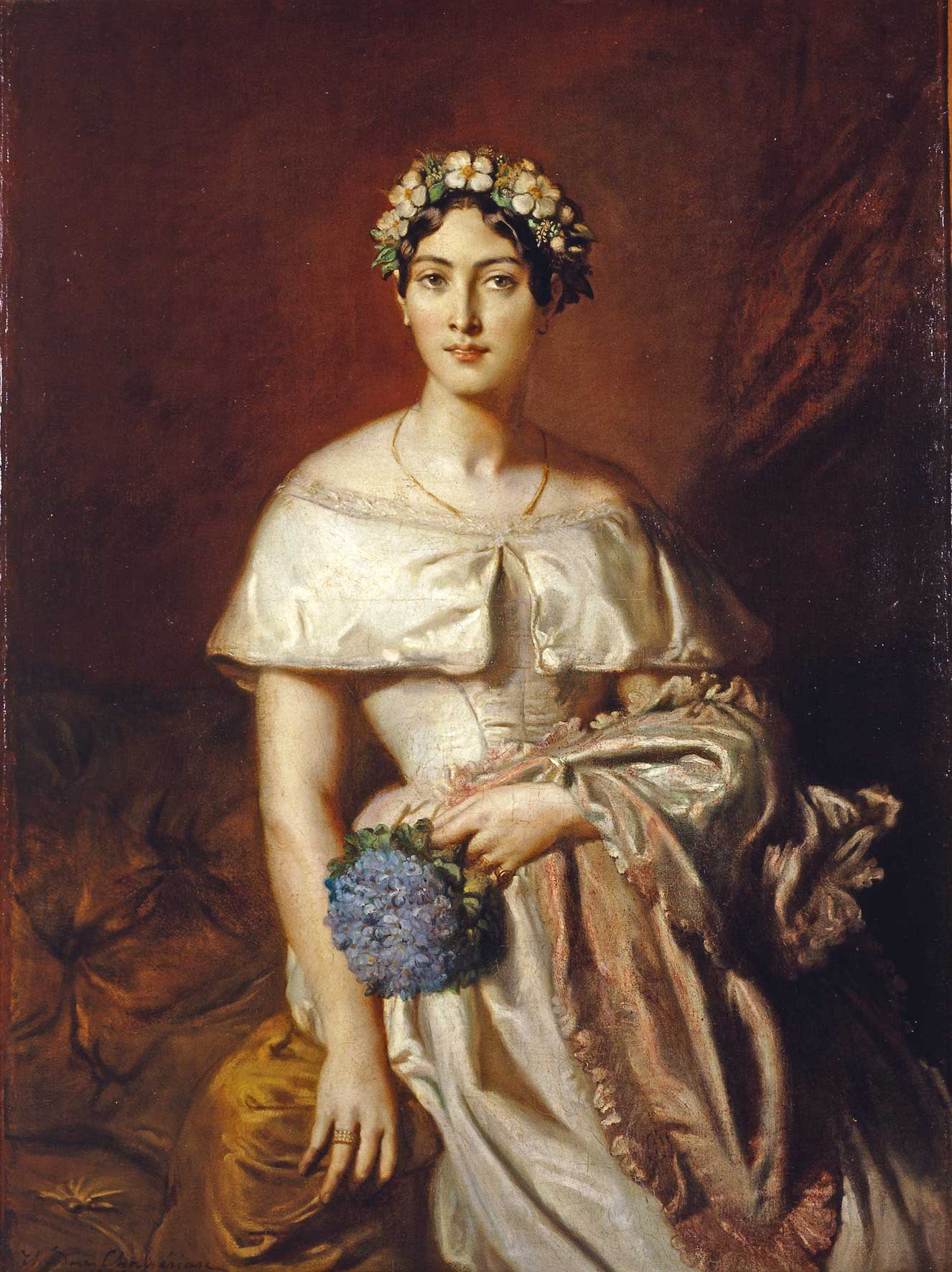
Portrait of Marie-Thérèse Tallien de Cabarrus by Théodore Chassériau

The Coronation of Baudouin, Emperor of Constantinople by Louis Gallait

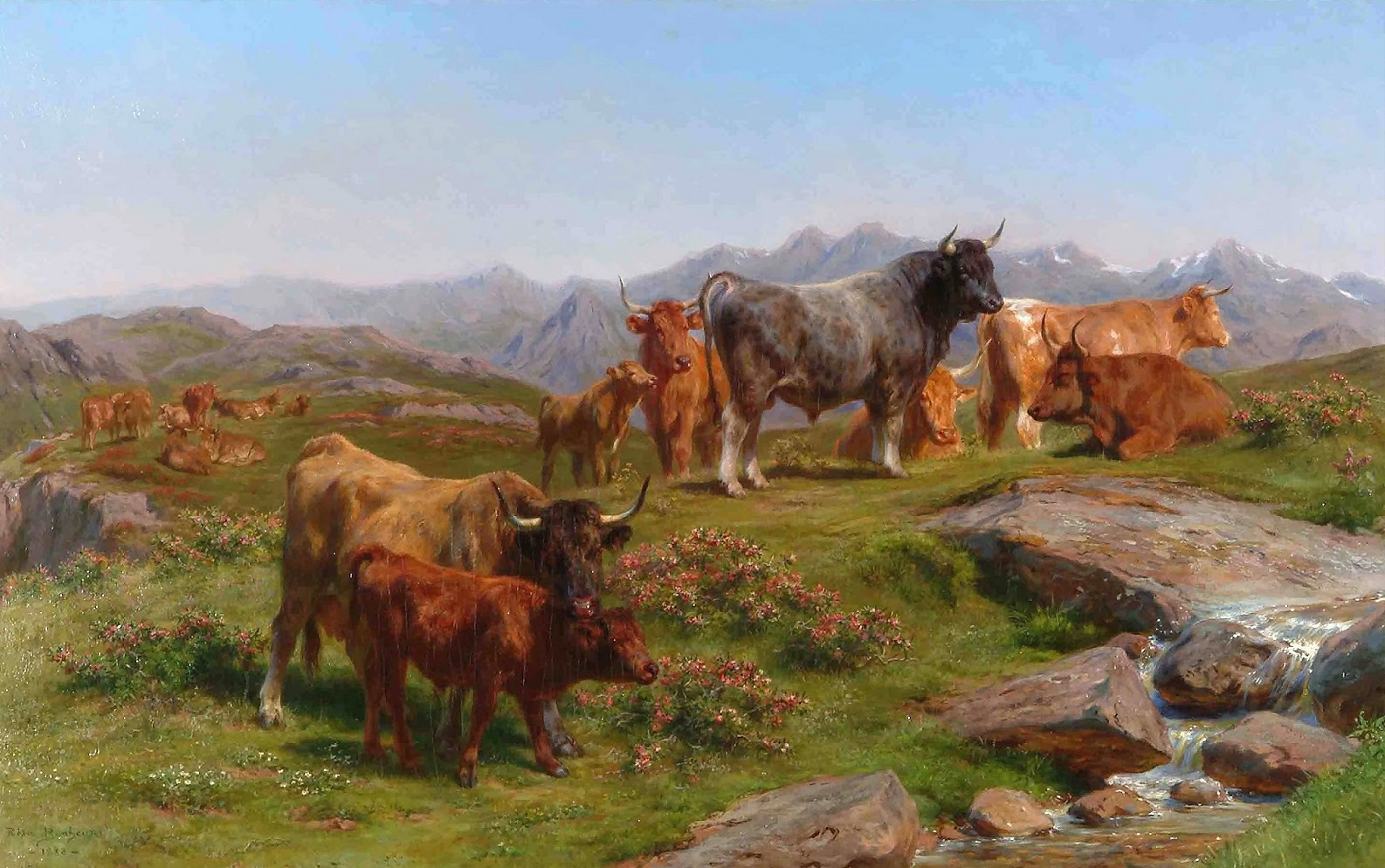
Cattle and Bulls, Cantal Breed by Rosa Bonheur

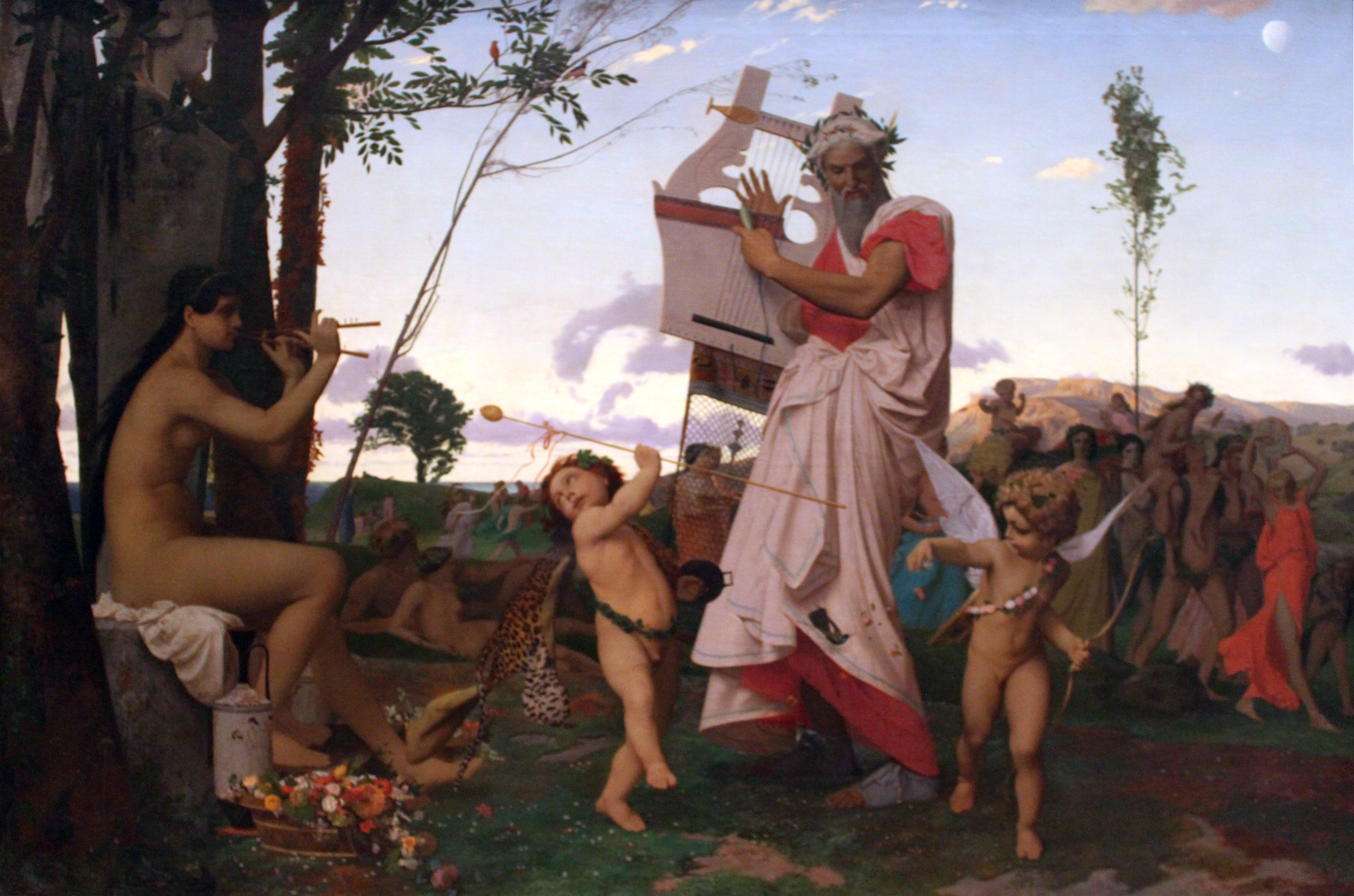
Anacreon, Bacchus and Eros by Jean-Léon Gérôme

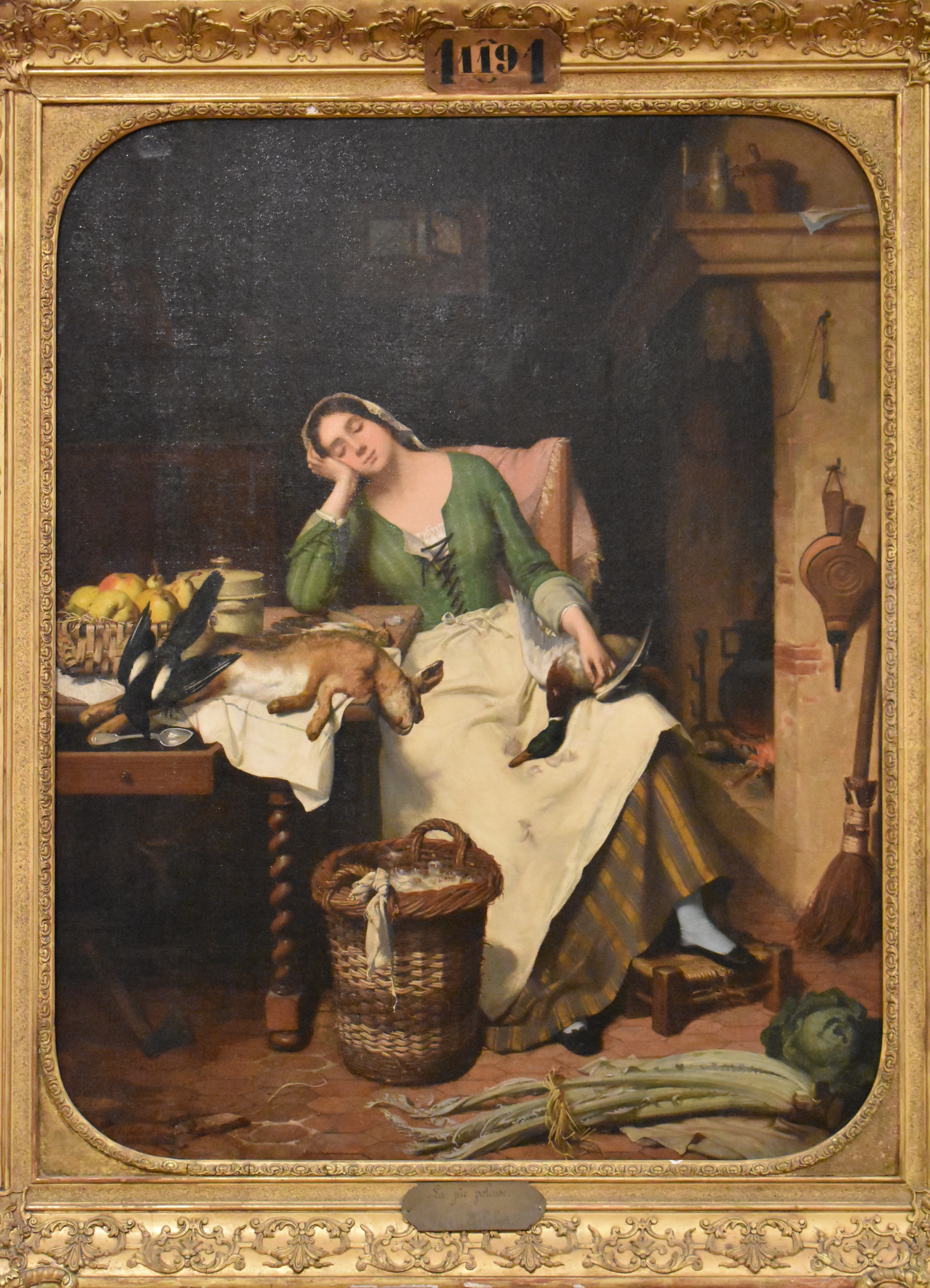
La pie voleuse by Jean Jalabert

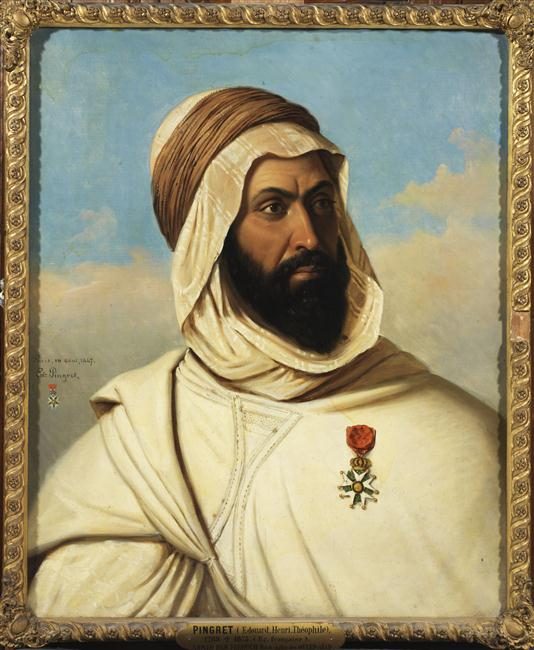
Portrait of Ahmed Ben Ferruch by Édouard Pingret

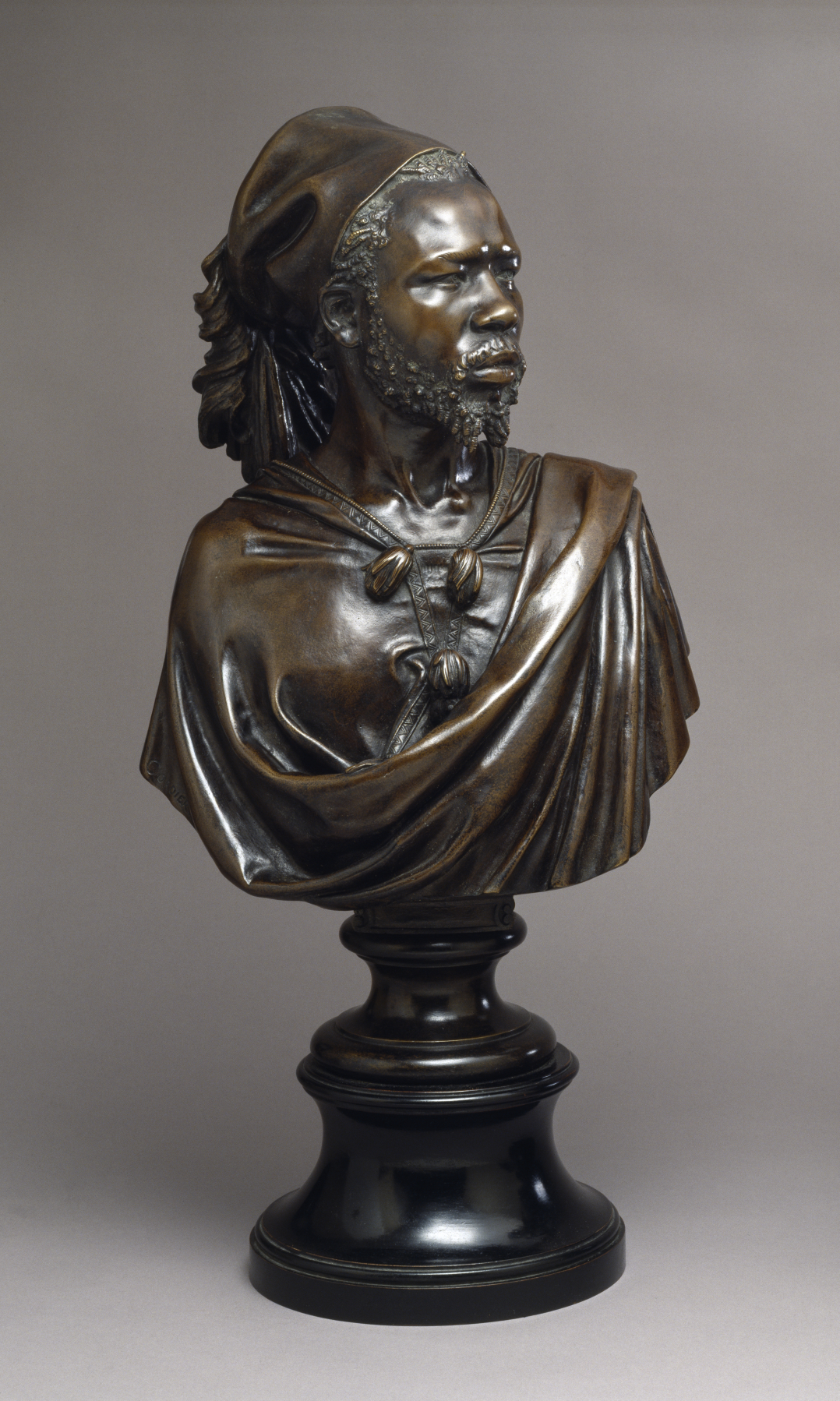
Saïd Abdullah of the Mayac by Charles Cordier

== See also ==
- Royal Academy Exhibition of 1848, a contemporary exhibition held at the National Gallery in London

== Bibliography ==
- Allard, Sébastien & Fabre, Côme. Delacroix. Metropolitan Museum of Art, 2018.
- Boime, Albert. Art in an Age of Counterrevolution, 1815-1848. University of Chicago Press, 2004.
- Mack, Gerstle. Gustave Courbet. Greenwood Press, 1970.
- Masanès, Fabrice. Gustave Courbet, 1819-1877: The Last of the Romantics. Taschen, 2006.
- Tinterow, Gary & Lacambre, Geneviève. Manet/Velázquez: The French Taste for Spanish Painting. Metropolitan Museum of Art, 2003.
