= The Death of Masaccio =

1817 painting by Auguste Couder

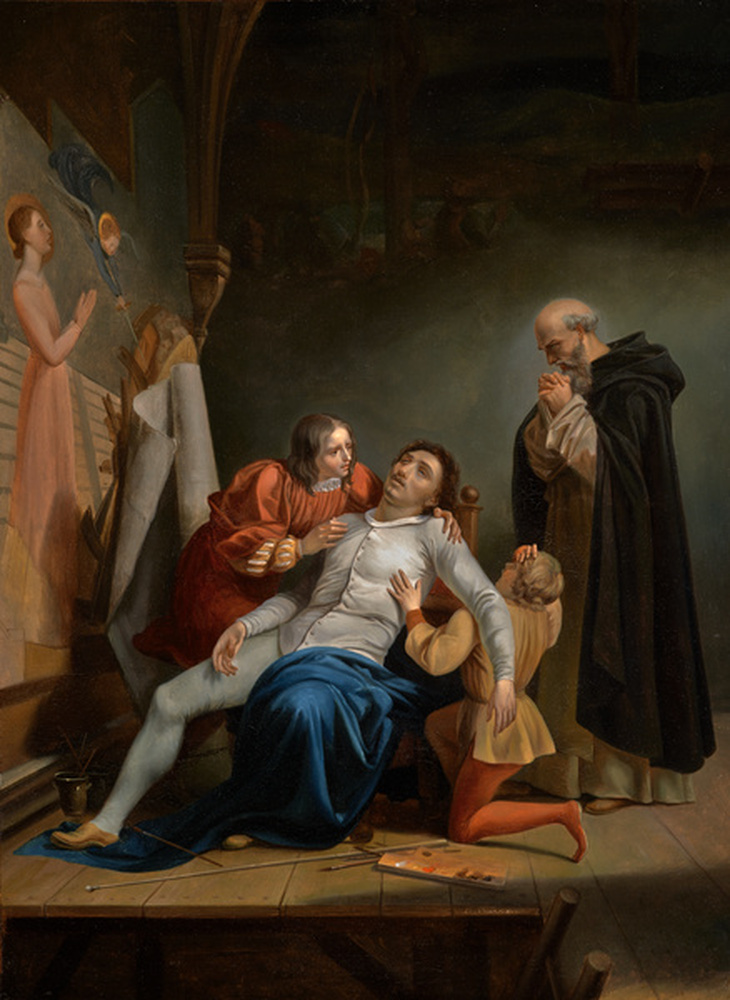
The Death of Masaccio, 1817, by Auguste Couder, Museum of Grenoble

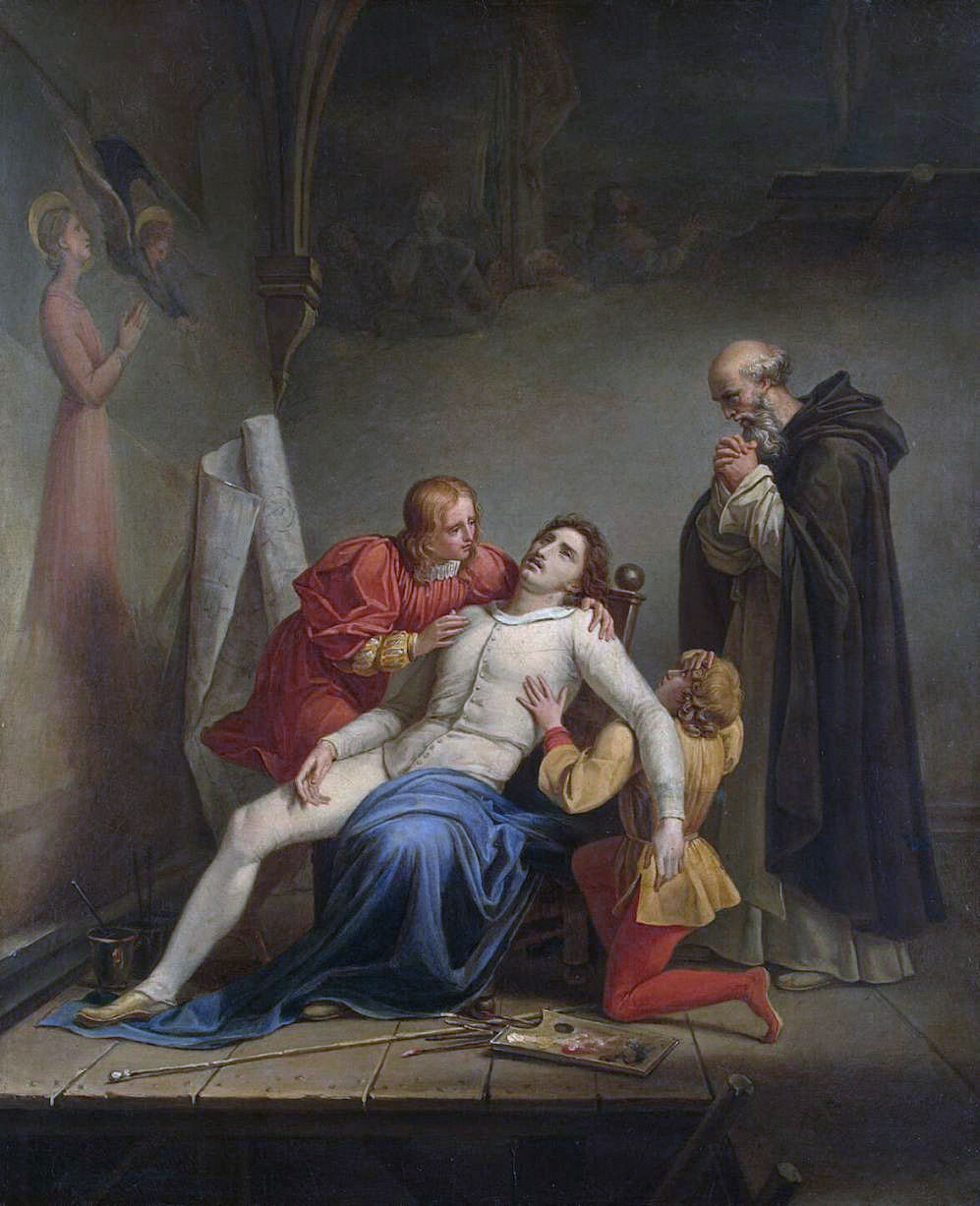
Smaller replica of the work at the Hermitage Museum.

The Death of Masaccio is an 1817 oil on canvas history painting by Auguste Couder of the death of 15th-century Florentine artist Masaccio, in the Museum of Grenoble since 2000. It was first exhibited at the Paris Salon of 1817. In 2014, the Museum of Grenoble loaned it to the musée des beaux-arts de Lyon for its exhibition L'invention du passé. Histoires de cœur et d'épée en Europe, 1802–1850.

A smaller replica of the work is at the Hermitage Museum, in Russia.
