= The Tennis Court Oath (David) =

Unfinished painting by Jacques-Louis David

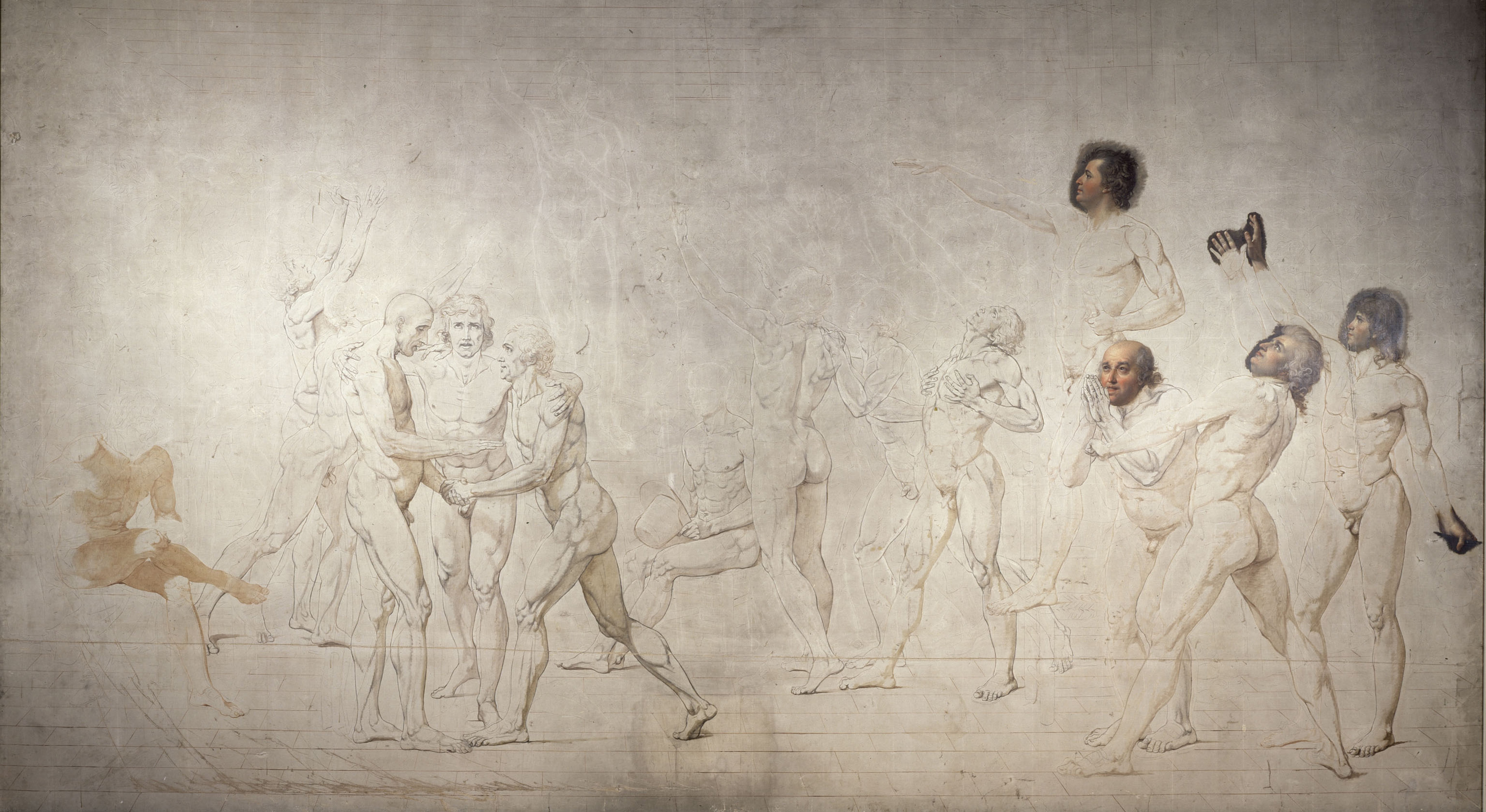
The Tennis Court Oath (Le Serment du Jeu de paume) by David

The Tennis Court Oath (French: Le Serment du Jeu de paume) is an incomplete painting by the French Neoclassical artist Jacques-Louis David, painted between 1790 and 1794 and showing the titular Tennis Court Oath at Versailles, one of the foundational events of the French Revolution.

Political reversals and financial difficulties meant that David was never able to finish the canvas, which measures 400 by 660 cm and is now in the Musée national du Château de Versailles.

== Description ==
All the deputies are shown looking at Bailly, as a device to show their support for him. The only man to refuse to take the oath, Martin-Dauch, is shown in the lower right hand corner and provides a counterpoint to the general enthusiasm. David also drew all the faces in detail so that every figure was recognisable. Above are large windows with smiling figures of the public.

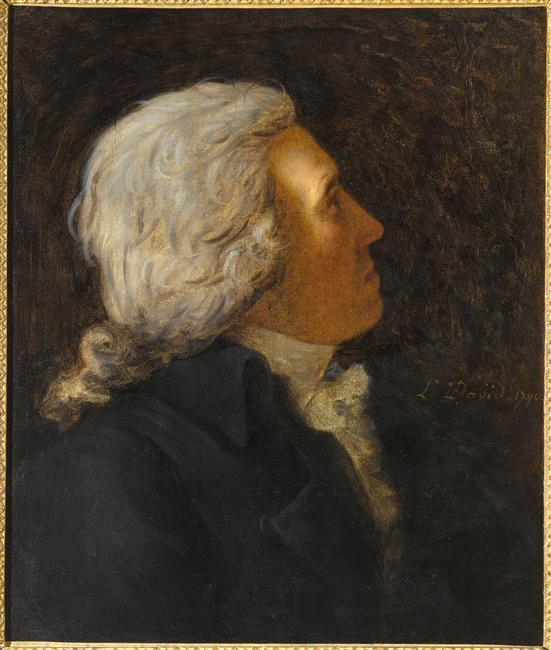
Sketch for Barère’s face

Sketch for Le Serment du Jeu de paume by David

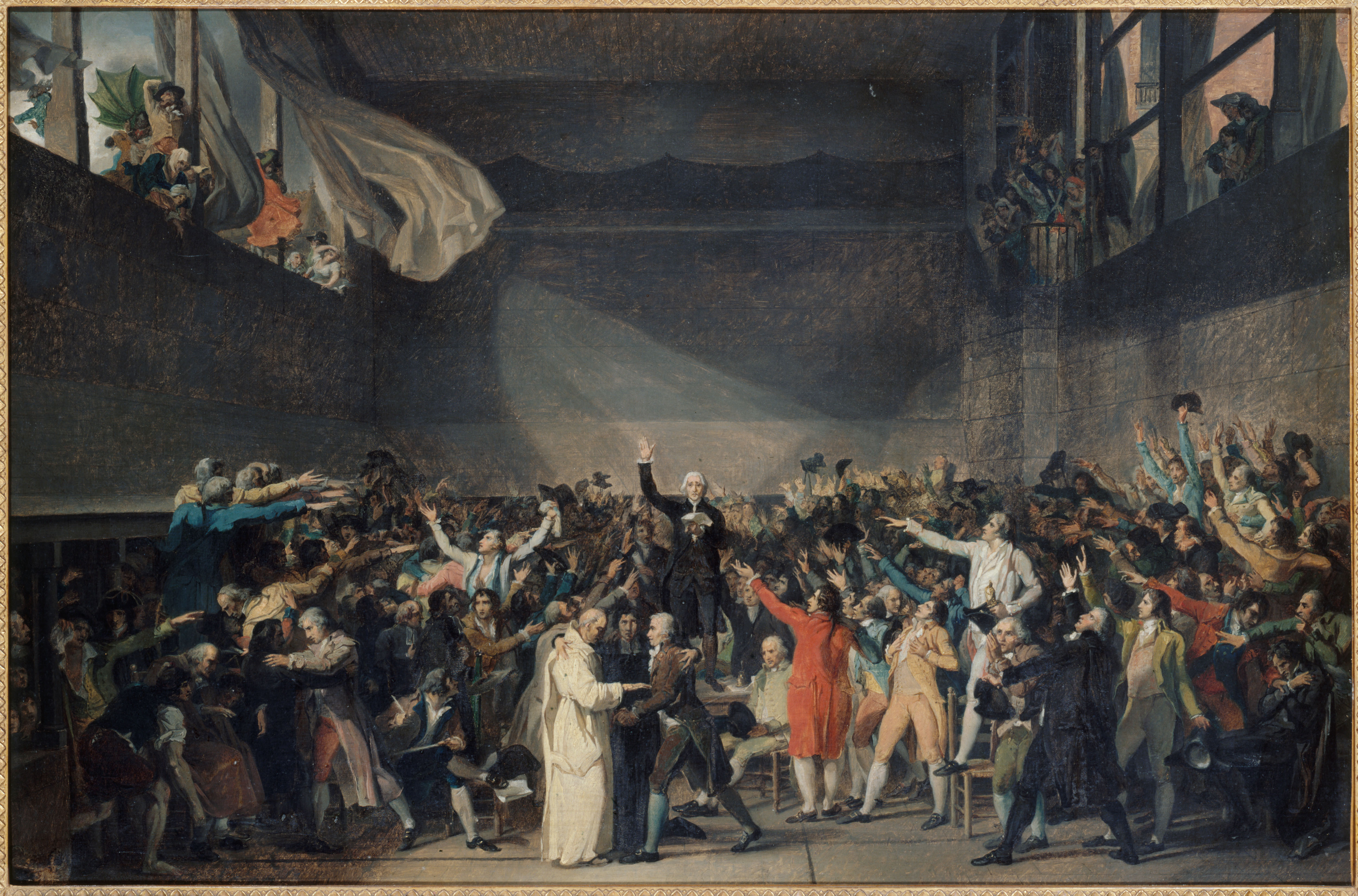
Oil sketch by David for Le Serment du Jeu de paume (musée Carnavalet)

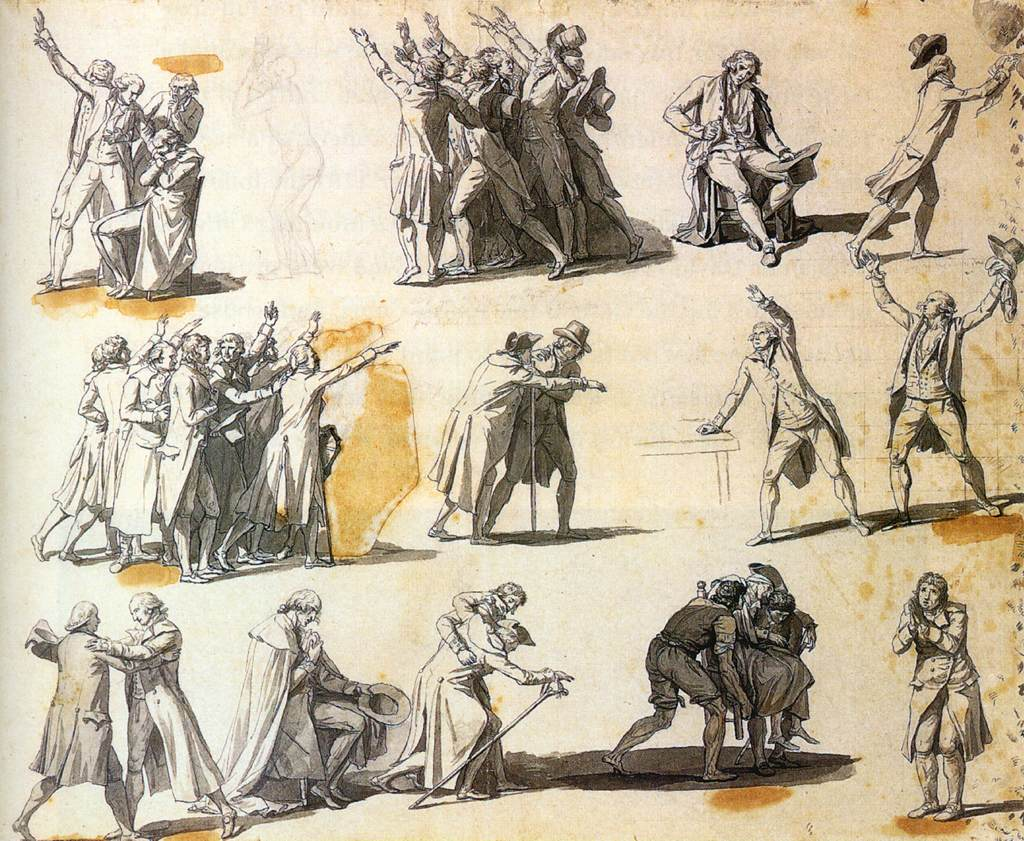
Sketches by David

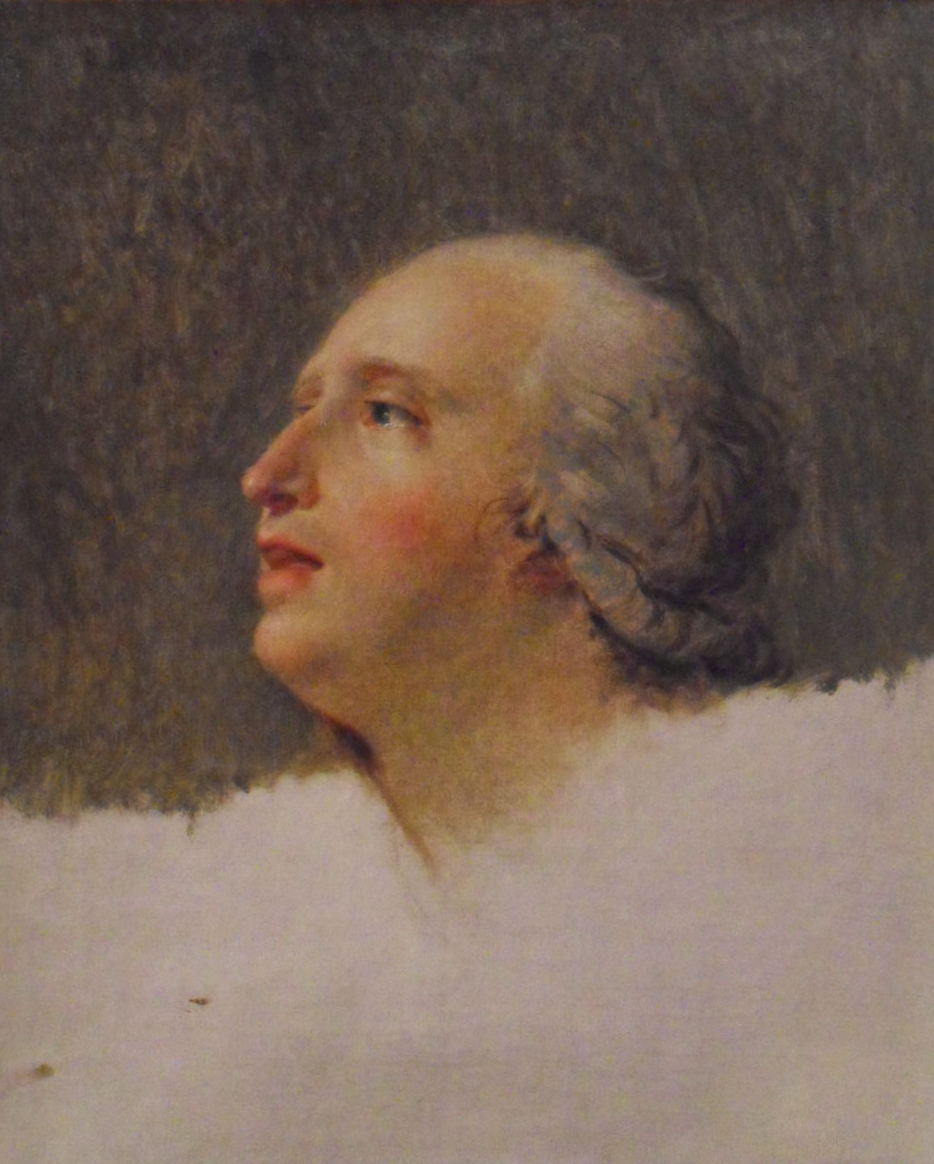
Sketch of Prieur de la Marne’s face

== Symbolic interpretation ==
In the 18th century, an oath had a sacred value and guaranteed a person would be faithful to their word, as in David's own The Oath of the Horatii. During the French Revolution, collective oaths like the tennis court oath were considered as a factor in national unity and national unanimity. The tennis court oath – pre-Romantic, near-unanimous, almost totally middle-class, and with no popular violence – above all was considered the forerunner of the 1789 revolution and also showed that national sovereignty was made up of each individual's personal will.

David's painting also portrays the monk Dom Gerle alongside the Protestant pastor Jean-Paul Rabaut Saint-Étienne, symbolizing a new era of religious tolerance. The wind blowing through the windows and billowing the curtains also symbolizes the wind of Revolution blowing through France.

This painting shows the Third Estate gathered together at an indoor tennis court after King Louis XVI locked the meeting hall at Versailles once he rejected to change the voting system. This is when Estate General proclaimed themselves as the National Assembly of France.

== History ==
The first engravings showing The Tennis Court Oath only appeared in 1790, the year David convinced the Jacobin Club to launch a national subscription to fund a painting to depict the event. He exhibited a pen and brown ink drawing of his planned painting at the Salon of 1791 in the Louvre but did not have enough money to follow it through as the subscription had only had a 10% take-up. The National Constituent Assembly thus decided to fund the work from the public treasury instead, topped up by selling engravings of the painting.

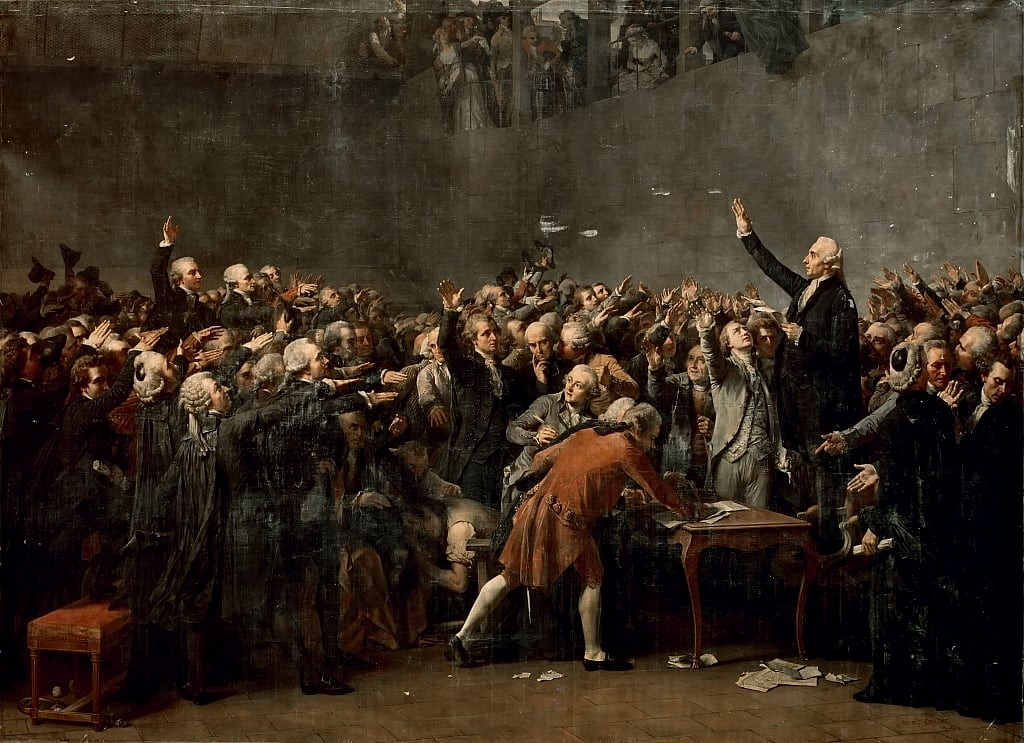
The Tennis Court Oath by Auguste Couder, 1848, (musée de la Révolution française)

David set up a studio in the former Les Feuillants Convent to hold sittings for the deputies, then meeting in the nearby salle du Manège. However, by 1793, he was too busy as a deputy himself to complete his sketch for the painting and French political life was no longer conducive to the work – Mirabeau, one of the heroes of 1789, had been declared an enemy of the Revolution on the discovery of his secret correspondence with Louis XVI and was now considered as a traitor by public opinion. A large number of deputies to the National Constituent Assembly had been identified as enemies of the Government of Public Safety. David therefore left the work unfinished and the subscribers reclaimed their engraving from him.

David's 1810 The Distribution of the Eagle Standards and his 1814 Leonidas at Thermopylae were directly inspired by The Tennis Court Oath. The work was also reprised and adapted by several artists from the late 18th century onwards. These included Auguste Couder in 1848 and Luc-Olivier Merson in 1883.

In 1820, David ceded the engraving rights on Jean Pierre Marie Jazet's engraving of The Tennis Court Oath to Daniel Isoard de Martouret. The canvas itself was finally acquired in 1836 by the royal museums for the Louvre, where it was exhibited from 1880 onwards.

== See also ==
- List of paintings by Jacques-Louis David
