= The Tennis Court Oath (Couder) =

1848 painting by Auguste Couder

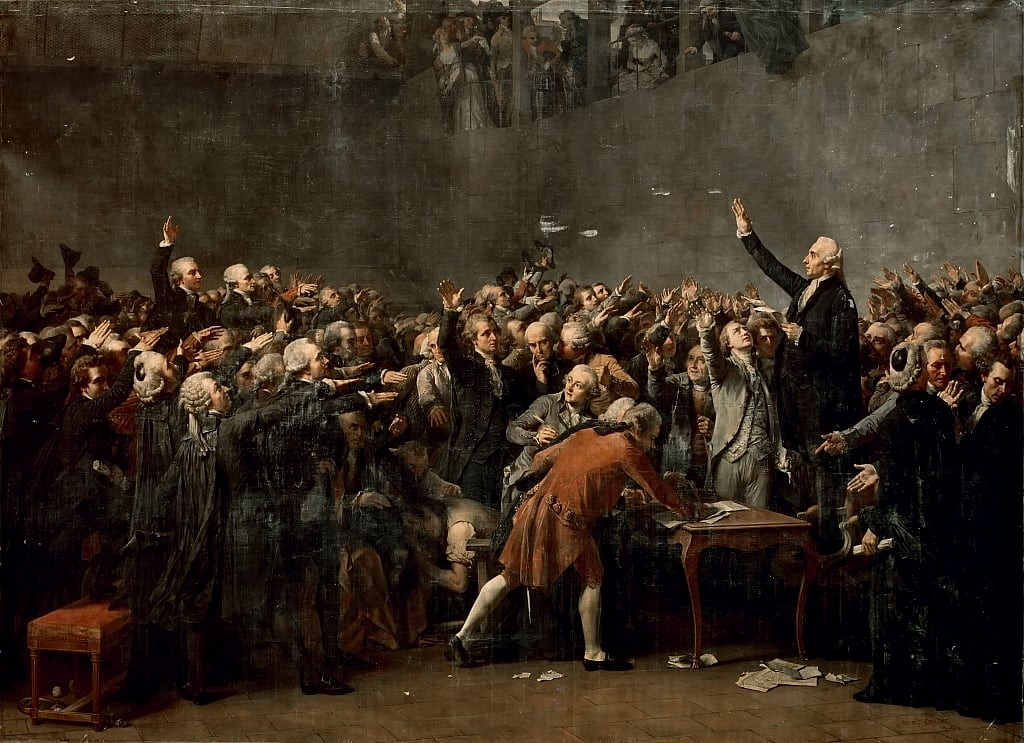
- Artist: Auguste Couder
- Year: 1848
- Type: Oil on canvas, history painting
- Dimensions: 420 cm × 580 cm (170 in × 230 in)
- Location: Palace of Versailles; Versailles

The Tennis Court Oath (French: Le Serment du Jeu de Paume) is an 1848 history painting by the French artist Auguste Couder. It depicts the Tennis Court Oath sworn by Third Estate on 20 June 1789 during the early stages of the French Revolution

Jacques-Louis David began a painting of the event during the Revolutionary period but famously abandoned his effort. More than fifty years later the reigning French King Louis Philippe commissioned this work. Although first commissioned in 1839, the painting was not completed for another nine years with Couder receiving a fee of 20,000 Francs. Couder did not attempt his painting to be a completion of the unfinished neoclassical precursor of David, but its large group scene has significant similarities. The picture was displayed at the Salon of 1848 at the Louvre in Paris. It is now in the collection of the Musée de l'Histoire de France at the Palace of Versailles.

== Bibliography ==
- Bordes, Phillipe. Le Serment du Jeu de Paume, de Jacques-Louis David. :Musée national du Château de Versailles et de Trianon, 1983.
