= Tennis court (disambiguation) =

A tennis court is a venue where the sport of tennis is played.

Tennis Court may also refer to:

- "Tennis Court" (song), 2013 song by Lorde
- "Tennis Court", a 2024 song by The Chainsmokers

== See also ==
- Tennis Court Road, Cambridge, England
- Tennis Court Oath (disambiguation)
