= Tennis Court Oath =

Event at the start of the French Revolution

- Serment du Jeu de Paume
- Drawing by Jacques-Louis David of the Tennis Court Oath.

General information
- Location: Royal Tennis Court of Versailles, Versailles, France
- Coordinates: 48°48′3.6″N 2°7′26″E

The Tennis Court Oath (French: Serment du Jeu de Paume, pronounced [sɛʁmɑ̃ dy ʒø də pom]) was taken on 20 June 1789 by the members of the French National Assembly in the hall of an indoor tennis court in the grounds of Versailles. Their vow "not to separate and to reassemble wherever necessary until the constitution of the kingdom is established" became a pivotal event in the French Revolution.

The Estates-General had been called to address the country's fiscal and agricultural crisis, but they had become bogged down in issues of representation immediately after convening in May 1789, particularly whether they would vote by order or by head (which would increase the power of the Third Estate, as it outnumbered the other two estates by a large margin). On 17 June of 1789, the Third Estate, joined by sympathetic members of the first two estates, declared itself the National Assembly, led by Jean Sylvain Bailly and Honoré Gabriel Riqueti, Comte de Mirabeau, who took prominent roles in much of early stages of the Revolution.

On the morning of 20 June the deputies were shocked to discover that the door of the Salle des Menus-Plaisir was locked and guarded by soldiers. They immediately feared the worst and were anxious that an attack was imminent from King Louis XVI, so upon the suggestion of one of their members Joseph-Ignace Guillotin, the deputies congregated in an indoor tennis court near the Palace of Versailles.

576 of the 577 members from the Third Estate took the oath. Bailly was the first one who signed; the only person who did not join was Joseph Martin-Dauch, who would only execute decisions that were made by the monarch. To prevent further sessions, the tennis court was rented on 21 or 22 June by the count of Artois, a brother of the king. Meanwhile, the Assembly moved to the Versailles Cathedral.

== Background ==
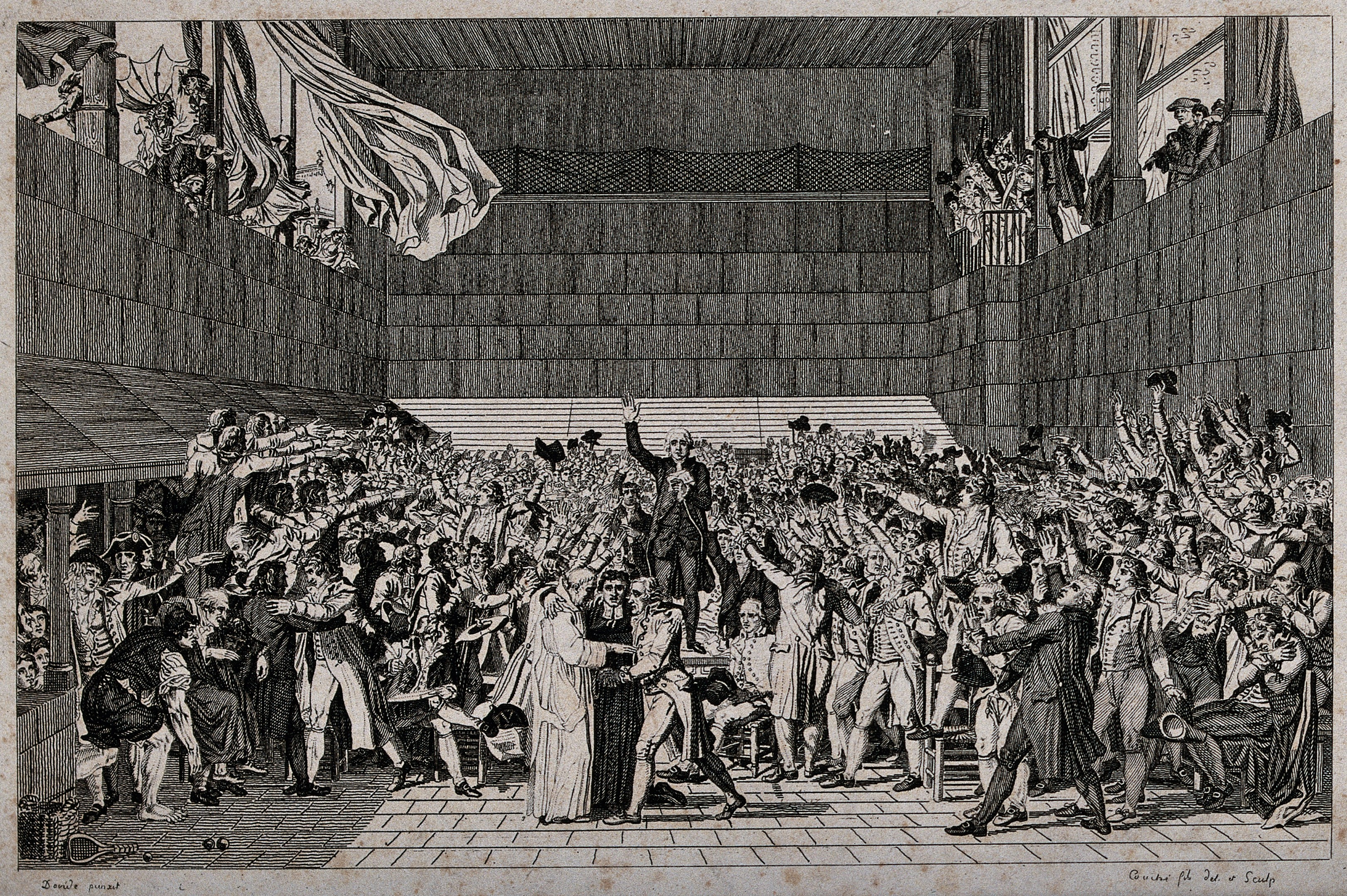
The deputies of the third estate meeting in the tennis court, swearing not to disperse until a constitution is assured.

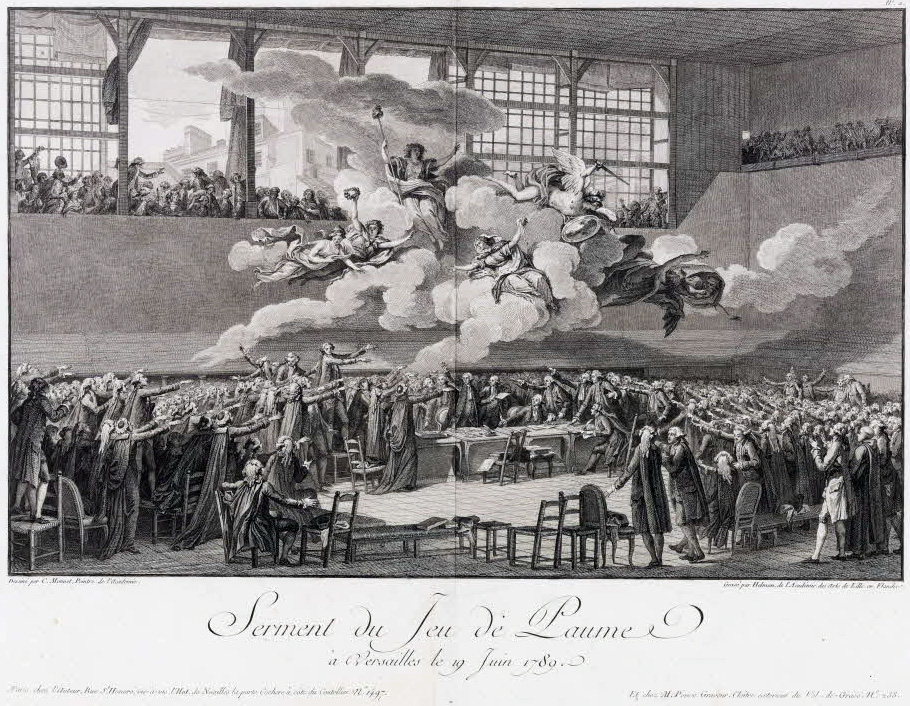
Etching by Helman after C. Monnet, “Serment du Jeu de Paume à Versailles” on 20 June 1789

Before the Revolution, French society—aside from royalty—was divided into three estates. The First Estate comprised the clergy; the Second Estate was the nobility. The rest of France—some 97 per cent of the population—was the Third Estate, which ranged from very wealthy city merchants to impoverished rural farmers. The three estates had historically met in the Estates General, a legislative assembly, but this had not happened since 1614, under the reign of Louis XIII. It was the last of the Estates General of the Kingdom of France. Summoned by King Louis XVI, the Estates General of 1789 ended when the Third Estate formed the National Assembly and, against the wishes of the king, invited the other two estates to join. This signaled the outbreak of the French Revolution.

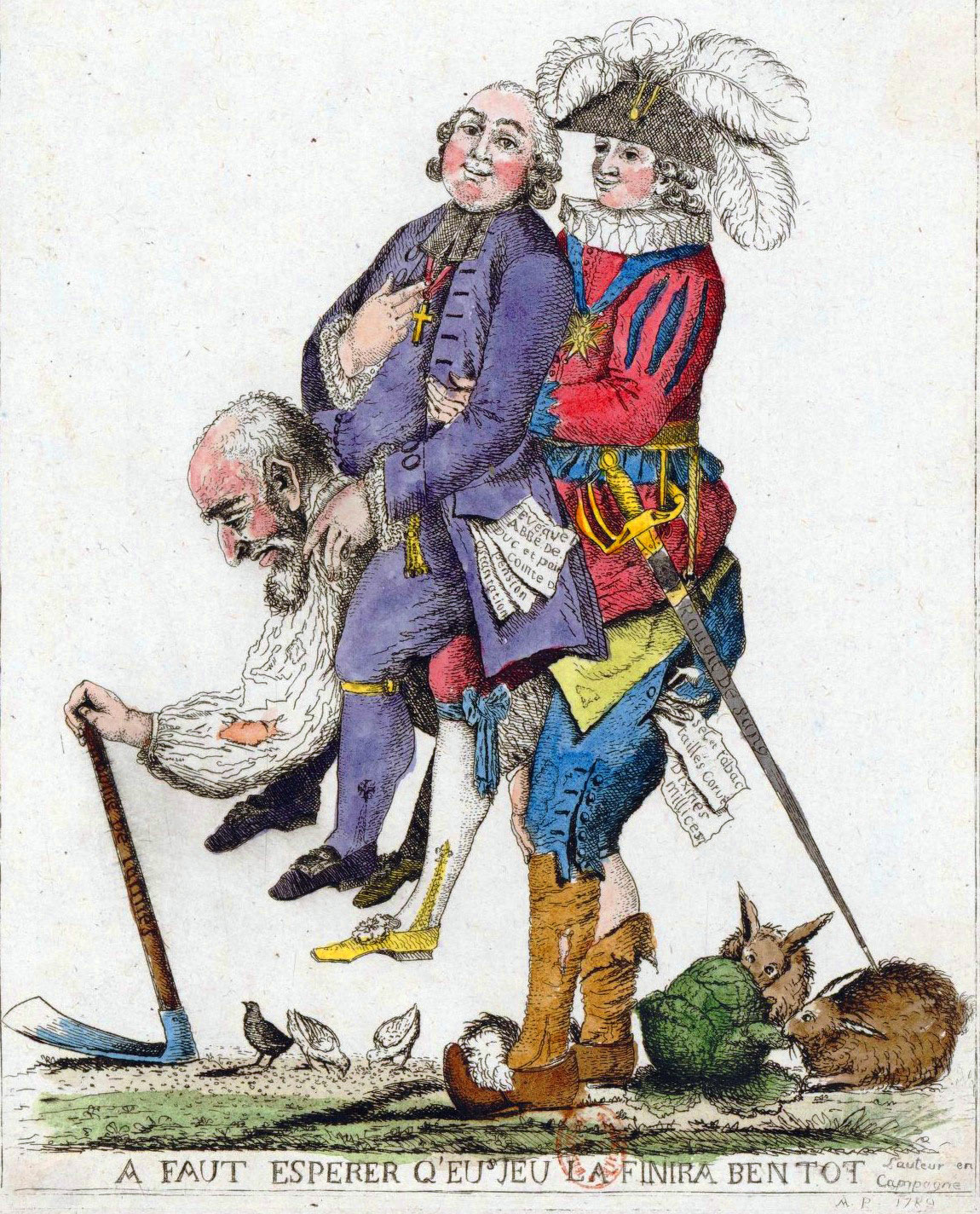
This satirical image depicts the Third Estate carrying the First and Second Estate on his back. Highlighting the taxation burden amongst the physical labor burden that the Third Estate had to endure while the First and Second Estates profited from them.

The Third Estate comprised the overwhelming majority of the French population, but the structure of the Estates-General was such that the Third Estate comprised a bare majority of the delegates. A simple majority was sufficient—as long as delegate votes were cast together. The First and Second Estates preferred to divide the vote; a proposal might need to receive approval from each Estate or there might be two "houses" of the Estates-General (one for the first two Estates, and one for the Third) and a bill would need to be passed by both houses. Either way, the First and Second Estates could exercise a veto over proposals enjoying widespread support among the Third Estate, such as reforms that threatened the privileges of the nobility and clergy.

The Tennis Court Oath built on France’s financial crisis of France’s involvement in the 7 Years War, the American Revolution, and King Louis XVI’s inefficient taxation system. The Third Estate consisting of commoners did not have the political power that the first and second estates had consisting of clergy and nobility. The third estate had to carry the tax burden of the first and second estate which made them outraged. This unfair taxation and representation led them to a political standoff where King Louis XVI locked them out to stop them from meeting, where they gathered to meet for the Tennis Court Oath. According to British historian William Doyle quotes in his novel, The Oxford Dictionary of the French Revolution, “The vast majority of French people who were not destitute lived under constant threat of becoming so, and were prepared to use violence to avoid such a fate. When they did, they terrified the narrow, secure social élites who in normal times dominated urban life and who never had to worry about the price of a four-pound loaf.” This places an emphasis on the difference in social class between the first and second Estate compared to the third Estate, where no social elites want to face the same fate as the lowly Third Estate.

Emmanuel Joseph Sieyes was a French Priest and writer who published his book titled, What is the Third Estate. He created this book to challenge the power of the nobility while simultaneously advocating for rights for the working class, the Third Estate. He advocates for the Third Estate to receive their proper recognition and representation stating, “Therefore, what is the Third Estate? Everything; but an everything shackled and oppressed. What would it be without the privileged order? Everything, but an everything free and flourishing. Nothing can succeed without it, everything would be infinitely better without the others.” According to this text Sieyes is highlighting that the Third Estates’ success is being held down by the First and Second Estate and that the Third Estate would be better off without the other estates.

== Oath ==
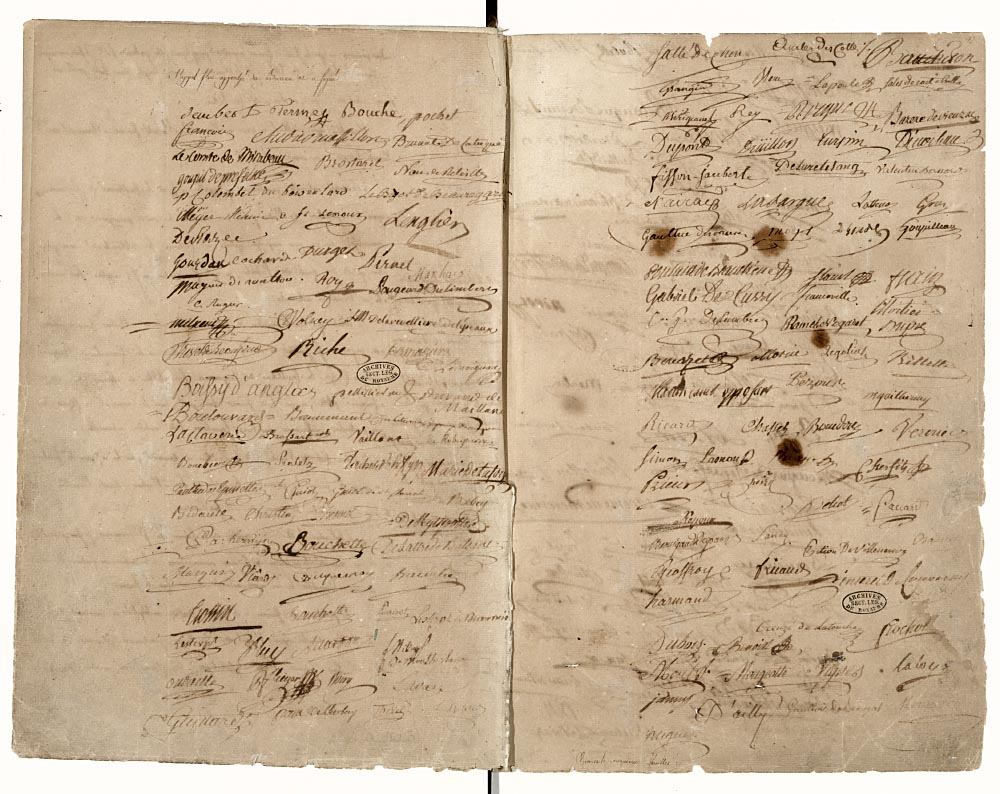
Minutes of the taking of the Jeu de Paume oath Signature page

The deputies' fears, even if wrong, were reasonable, and the importance of the oath goes above and beyond its context. The oath was a revolutionary act and an assertion that political authority derived from the people and their representatives rather than from the monarchy. Their solidarity forced Louis XVI to order the clergy and the nobility to join the Third Estate in the National Assembly to give the illusion that he controlled the National Assembly. This oath was vital to the Third Estate as a protest that led to more power in the Estates General in every governing body thereafter. Among the oath-takers were five delegates from the colony of Saint-Domingue.

The text was prepared by Antoine Barnave and Isaac Le Chapelier. An English-language translation of the oath reads:

Considering that it has been called to establish the constitution of the realm, to bring about the regeneration of public order, and to maintain the true principles of monarchy; nothing may prevent it from continuing its deliberations in any place it is forced to establish itself; and, finally, the National Assembly exists wherever its members are gathered.

Decrees that all members of this Assembly immediately take a solemn oath never to separate, and to reassemble wherever circumstances require until the constitution of the realm is established and fixed upon solid foundations; and that said oath having been sworn, all members and each one individually confirms this unwavering resolution with his signature.

We swear never to separate ourselves from the National Assembly, and to reassemble wherever circumstances require until the constitution of the realm is drawn up and fixed upon solid foundations.

== Significance and aftermath ==
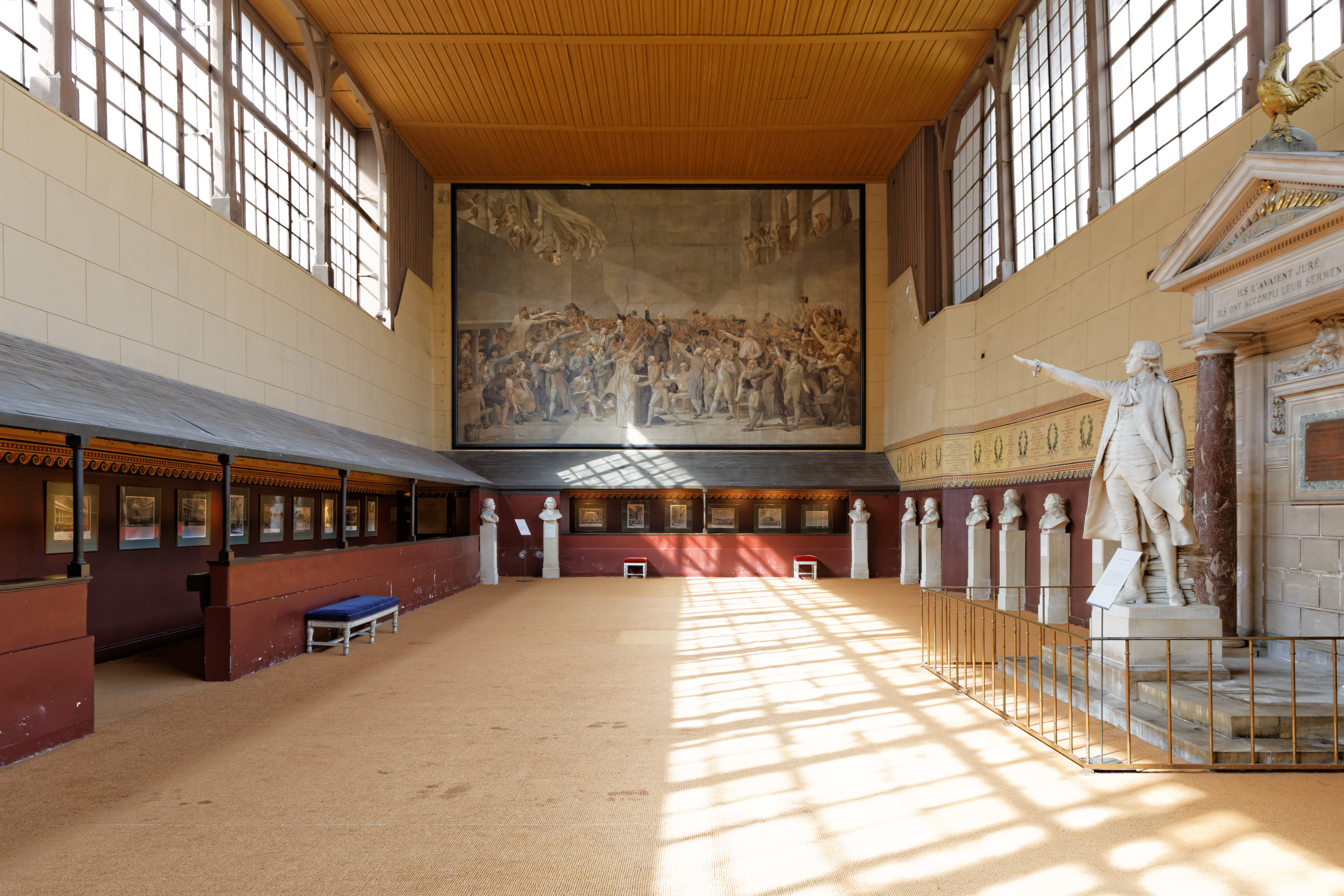
The Tennis Court was built in 1686 near the Palace of Versailles.

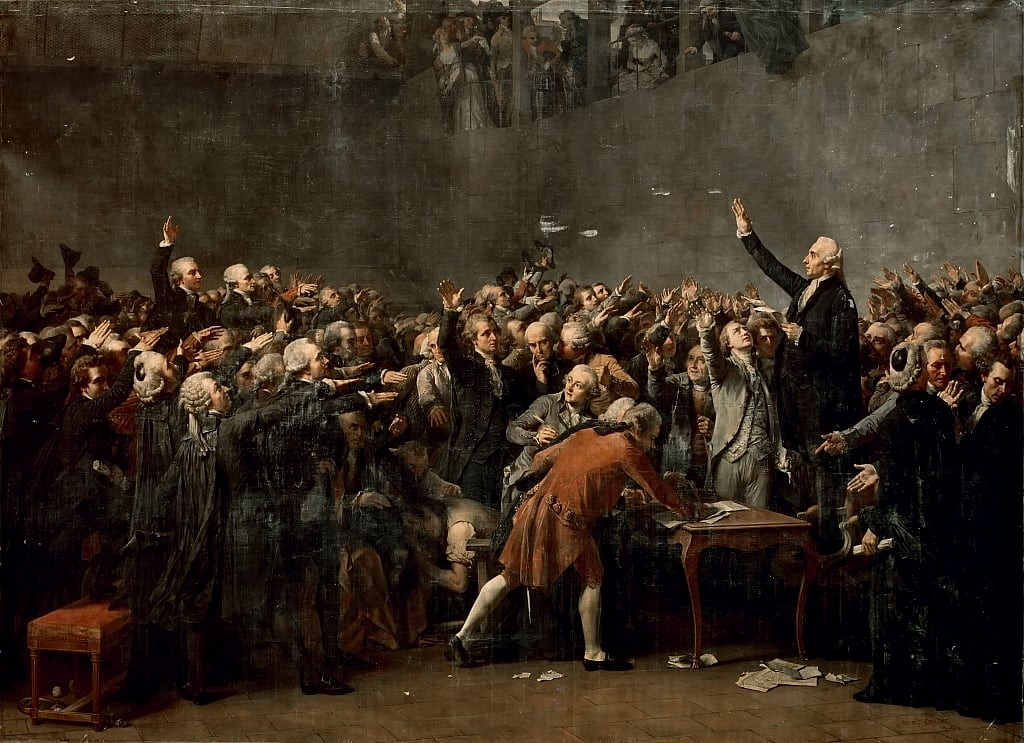
The Tennis Court Oath by Auguste Couder, 1848

The oath signified for the first time that French citizens formally stood in opposition to Louis XVI. The National Assembly's refusal to back down forced the king to make concessions. It was foreshadowed by and drew considerably from the 1776 United States Declaration of Independence, especially the preamble. The oath inspired a wide variety of revolutionary activities in the months afterwards, ranging from rioting in the French countryside to renewed calls for a written constitution. It reinforced the Assembly's strength, and although the king attempted to thwart its effect, Louis was forced to relent, and on 27 June 1789 he formally requested that voting occur based on head counts, not on each estates' power.

The Tennis Court Oath preceded the Storming of the Bastille in July, the abolition of feudalism in August, and the Declaration of the Rights of Man and of the Citizen on 26 August. The members of the National Constituent Assembly became increasingly divided. The French Constitution of 1791 redefined the organization of the French government, taxation system, male census suffrage and the limits to the powers of government.

Following the 100 year celebration of the oath in 1889, what had been the Royal Tennis Court was again forgotten and deteriorated. Prior to World War II, there was a plan to convert it into a table tennis room for Senate administrators at the Palace. In 1989, the bicentenary of the French Revolution served as an opportunity to restore the tennis court.

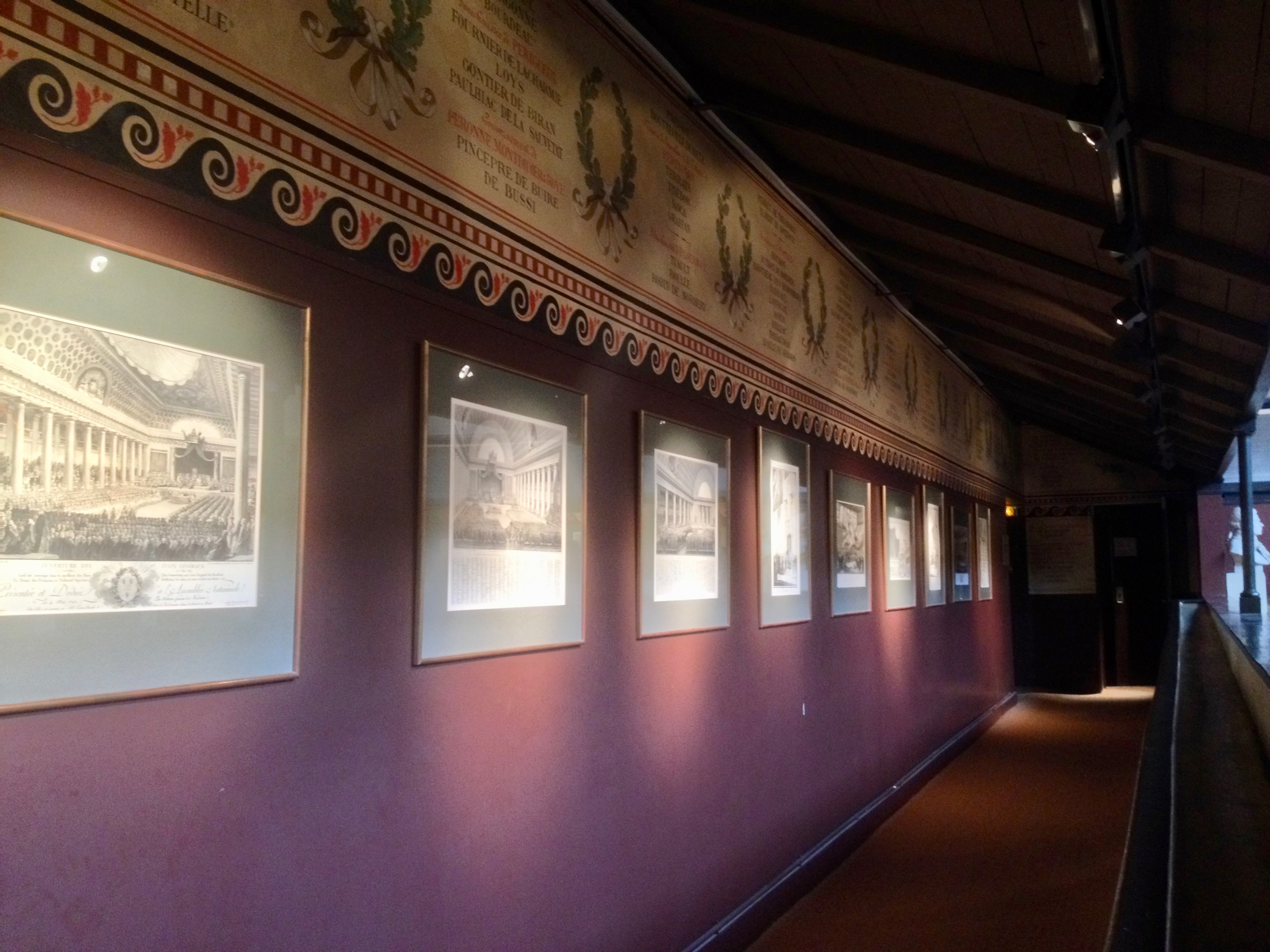
In the western gallery of the Salle du Jeu de Paume, reproductions of the engravings are on display.
