= The Winnower (Millet) =

19th-century painting by Jean-François Millet

- Un Vanneur (French)
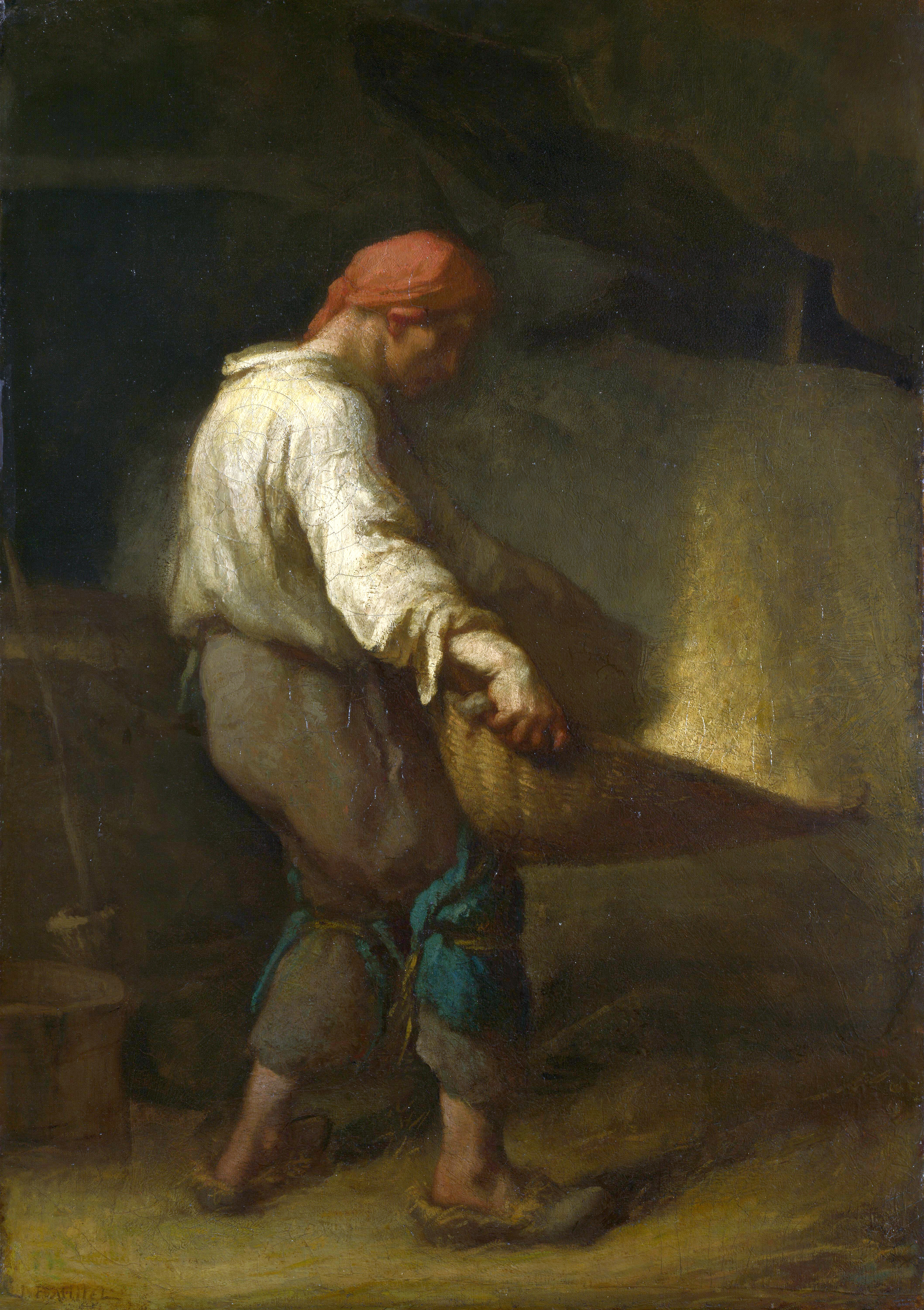
- Artist: Jean-François Millet
- Year: 1847–1848
- Type: Oil painting on canvas
- Dimensions: 100.5 cm × 71 cm (39.6 in × 28 in)
- Location: National Gallery, London

The Winnower is the title of three oil on canvas paintings by French artist Jean-François Millet, created between 1847 and 1848. The first, now held at the National Gallery, in London, was painted in 1847-1848, and presented at the Salon of 1848. Subsequently, Millet created two other versions, one kept at the Louvre Museum, in Paris, much smaller than the original, and the other at the Musée d'Orsay, also in Paris.

== History ==
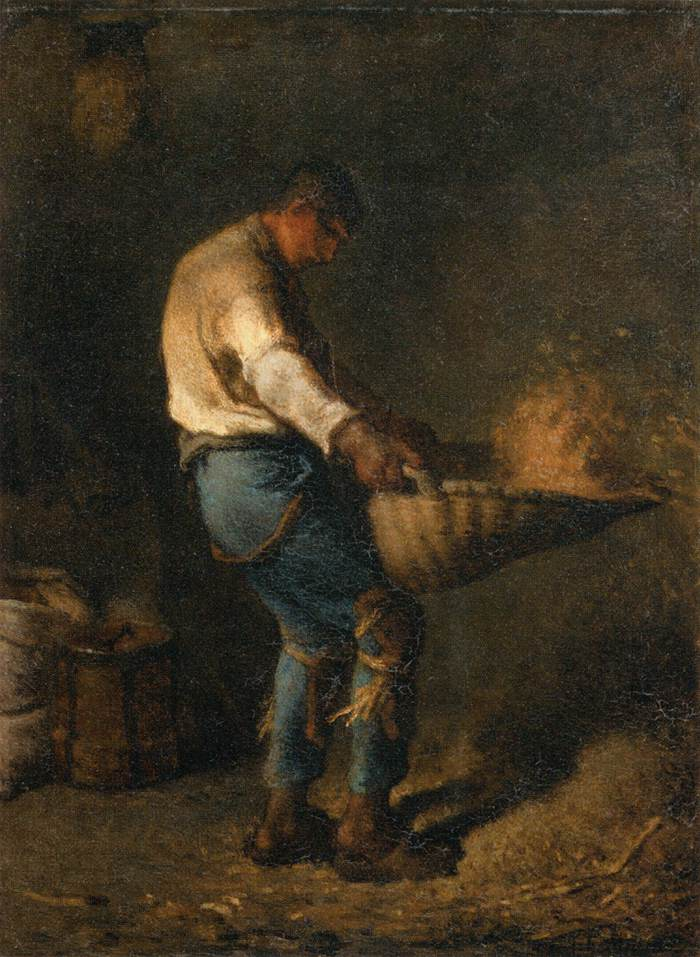
The Winnower (1848), second version

The first version of The Winnower was presented in the Grand Salon during the Salon of 1848, at the same time as The Captivity of the Jews of Babylon. If this work, as an history painting, was intended to attract buyers, the first marked Millet's entry into a new genre: the painting of peasant daily life. Indeed, with this representation of a winnower, Millet turns away from his literary and artistic references to offer works directly inspired by the peasant life, a vein that he will pursue from 1849 by settling in Barbizon. Furthermore Millet also produced at least two other versions of the work. The first, much smaller, is on display at the Louvre Museum, and the second is at the Musée d'Orsay.

== Description ==
This series indeed represents each time a winnower, dressed in his working clothes and with clogs on his feet, who, using a van, blows up the grain to separate it from the straw. An evolution in the representation is however notable in the three paintings. The winnower indeed seems to recover from one version to another.

Be that as it may, The Winnower like Millet's other figures, gleaners, shepherdesses, ploughmen, etc, is much more the representation of a type than of an individual person. Millet wanted above all to create “syntheses” as he called them. The appearance of these peasant subject in Millet's work may have been favored by the socialist climate that reigned around the Revolution of 1848, even if Millet did not participate in it and refused to be called a "socialist".

== Reception ==
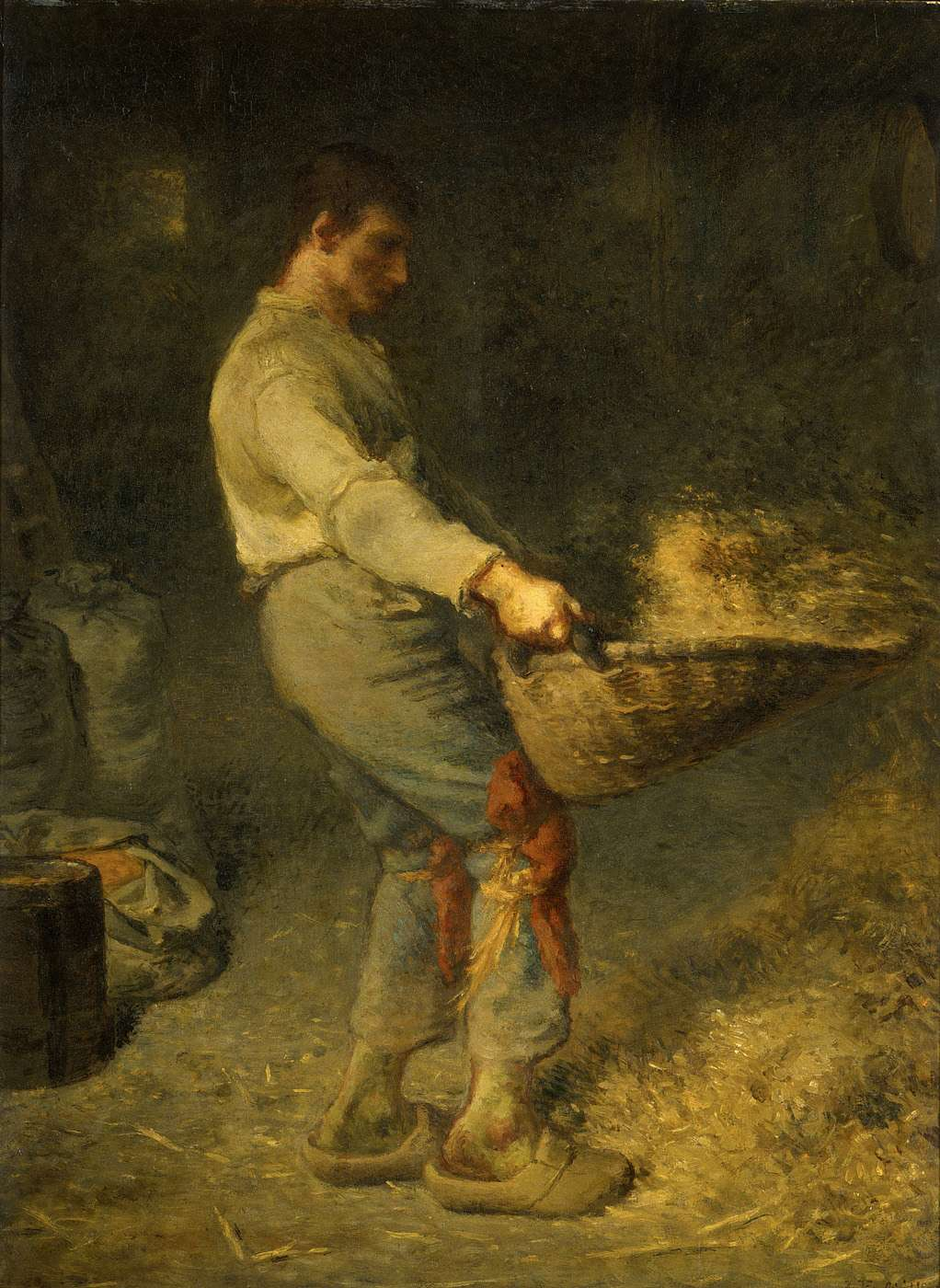
The Winnower (c. 1848), third version

Writer Théophile Gautier in his work about the Salon de 1848 described this painting thus: “It is impossible to see anything rougher, more fierce, more bristling, more uncultivated; well! this mortar, this thick mess to retain the brush, is of excellent locality, of a fine and warm tone when one steps back three paces. This winnower who raises his van with his ragged knee, and raises into the air, in the middle of a column of golden dust, the grain of his basket, arches his back in the most masterly manner." He also adds that "M. Millet's painting has everything it takes to exasperate the bourgeois with hairless chins", a remark which explains the interest that the Republicans found in this work.

This painting, presented at the Salon of 1848, stood out among the 5000 other works exhibited that year, and was bought for 500 francs by Alexandre-Ledru-Rollin, Minister of the Provisional Government.

Its importance is all the greater as it notably inspired Gustave Courbet for his painting The Stone Breakers, made in 1849, which was destroyed during the bombardment of Dresden in 1945.
