= Portrait of Claude-Armand Gérôme =

Painting by Jean-Léon Gérôme

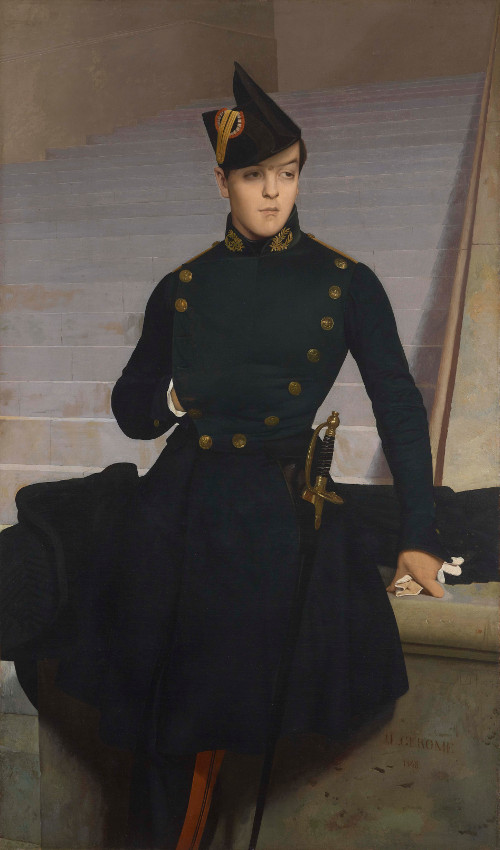
- Artist: Jean-Léon Gérôme
- Year: 1848
- Type: Oil on canvas, portrait painting
- Dimensions: 160 cm × 94 cm (63 in × 37 in)
- Location: Fitzwilliam Museum; Cambridge

Portrait of Claude-Armand Gérôme is an 1848 portrait painting by the French artist Jean-Léon Gérôme. It depicts his younger brother Claude-Armand in the uniform of a student of the École polytechnique, which specialised in engineering. The sitter was twenty one when he posed for the painting. He died two years later from illness.

The work was displayed at the Salon of 1848 at the Louvre in Paris. Today the painting is in the collection of the Fitzwilliam Museum in Cambridge, having been acquired in 2017.

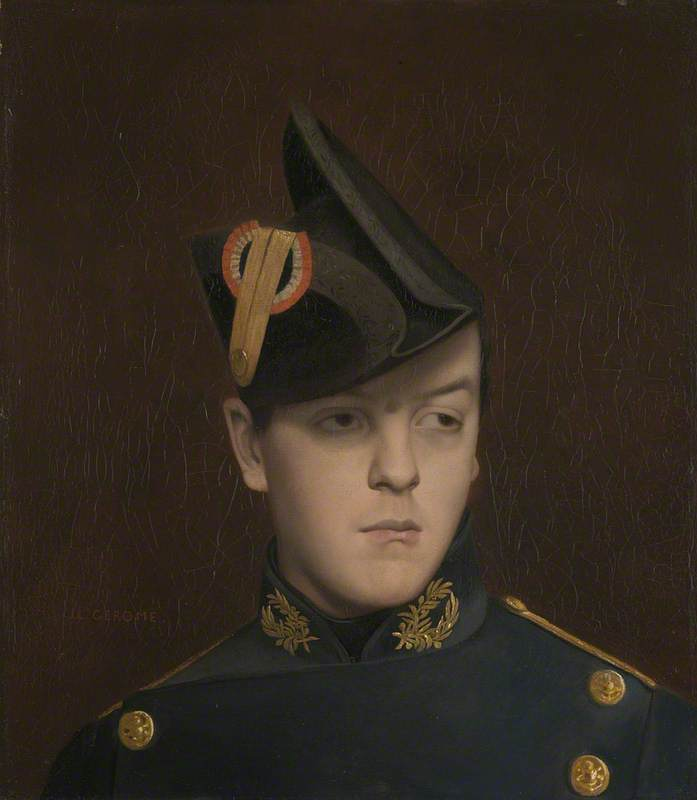
Armand Gérome

== Bibliography ==
- De Font-Réaulx, Dominique, Des Cars, Laurence & Papet, Édouard. 'The Spectacular Art of Jean-Léon Gérôme". University of California Press, 2010
- Lafont-Couturier, Hélène. Gérôme and Goupil. Réunion des musées nationaux, 2000
