= Joseph Martin-Dauch =

French politician

Le serment du jeu de Paume par David - The oath of the Jeu de Paume by Jacques-Louis David -- Joseph Martin-Dauch is seated in the lower right with his arms crossed and his head bowed..

Joseph Martin-Dauch, (26 May 1741 – 5 July 1801) was a French politician who represented Castelnaudary as a member of the Third Estate in the Estates-General of 1789. He is remembered as the only member, of 577 delegates, not to vote in favor of the Tennis Court Oath. He did so on the grounds that he could not faithfully execute any decisions that were not sanctioned by the king.

== Early life ==
Joseph Martin-Dauch was born in Castelnaudary, the son of Antoine Martin Dauch, a counselor to the king, who owned a vineyard, and Marie Barbe Latour. He was educated at Toulouse, where he graduated with a degree in law in 1762.

== Tennis Court Oath ==
After finding themselves locked out of their assembly room, the 577 representatives of the Third Estate gathered in a nearby indoor tennis court. The representative Mounier proposed that the members present make a solemn oath never to separate, and to meet wherever circumstances required, until the constitution of the kingdom was established and strengthened on solid foundations. Each representative signed the oath, in turn, until the pen was passed to Martin-Dauch; he declared that his constituents did not send him to insult the monarchy, and that he would protest against the oath. The other representatives immediately protested, but Martin-Dauch stood up and affirmed that he could not execute any decisions not sanctioned by the king. The president of the assembly tried to convince Martin-Dauch that members had the right to refrain, but not to object to the wishes of the overall congregation. In spite of all of this, Martin-Dauch stood firm and wrote "opponent" in front of his name. Shouts of indignation rose up throughout the hall, including cries of "Death!", but a bailiff named Guillot took him out the back door and into the street.

== Life after the Tennis Court Oath ==
Martin-Dauch's signature is visible on the original oath, but it is very choppy and virtually illegible, a sign of how hurriedly it was signed. Jean Sylvain Bailly would later push for Martin-Dauch to be withdrawn, and when this did not work simply warned him not to attend any further meetings. Martin-Dauch ignored these threats, however, and continued to take his place among his colleagues. He continued to sit and participate in discussions until the end of the Estates-General.

On the day Louis XVI went to the meeting to give his approval of the constitution, the other representatives remained seated, but Martin-Dauch, true to his resolution and independence, rose and acknowledged the king. After the Estates-General ended, Martin-Dauch retired to Toulouse. He was thrown in prison during the Reign of Terror, but was afterwards released. He was saved from the guillotine when he gave a false name to revolutionary authorities. He also survived at least one assassination attempt.
