= Auguste Couder =

French painter

Louis-Charles-Auguste Couder
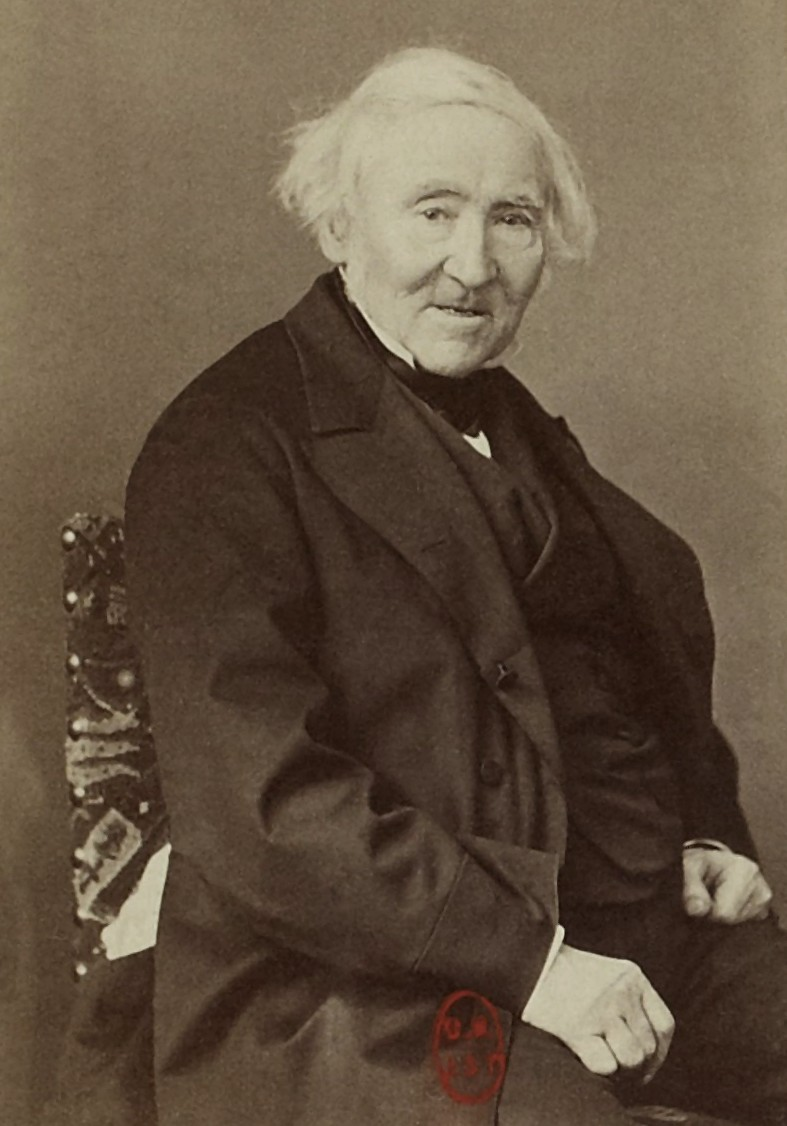
- Born: 1 April 1789; London, England
- Died: 21 July 1873 (aged 84); Paris, France
- Known for: Painting
- Spouse: Cornelia Stouf

Louis-Charles-Auguste Couder, or Auguste Couder (1 April 1789 – 21 July 1873), was a French painter and student of Jean-Baptiste Regnault and Jacques-Louis David. He joined the Académie des beaux-arts in 1839 and was an officer of the Légion d'honneur. He married Cornélie Stouf, daughter of the sculptor Jean-Baptiste Stouf.

Couder was buried in the cemetery of Père-Lachaise.

== Famous paintings ==
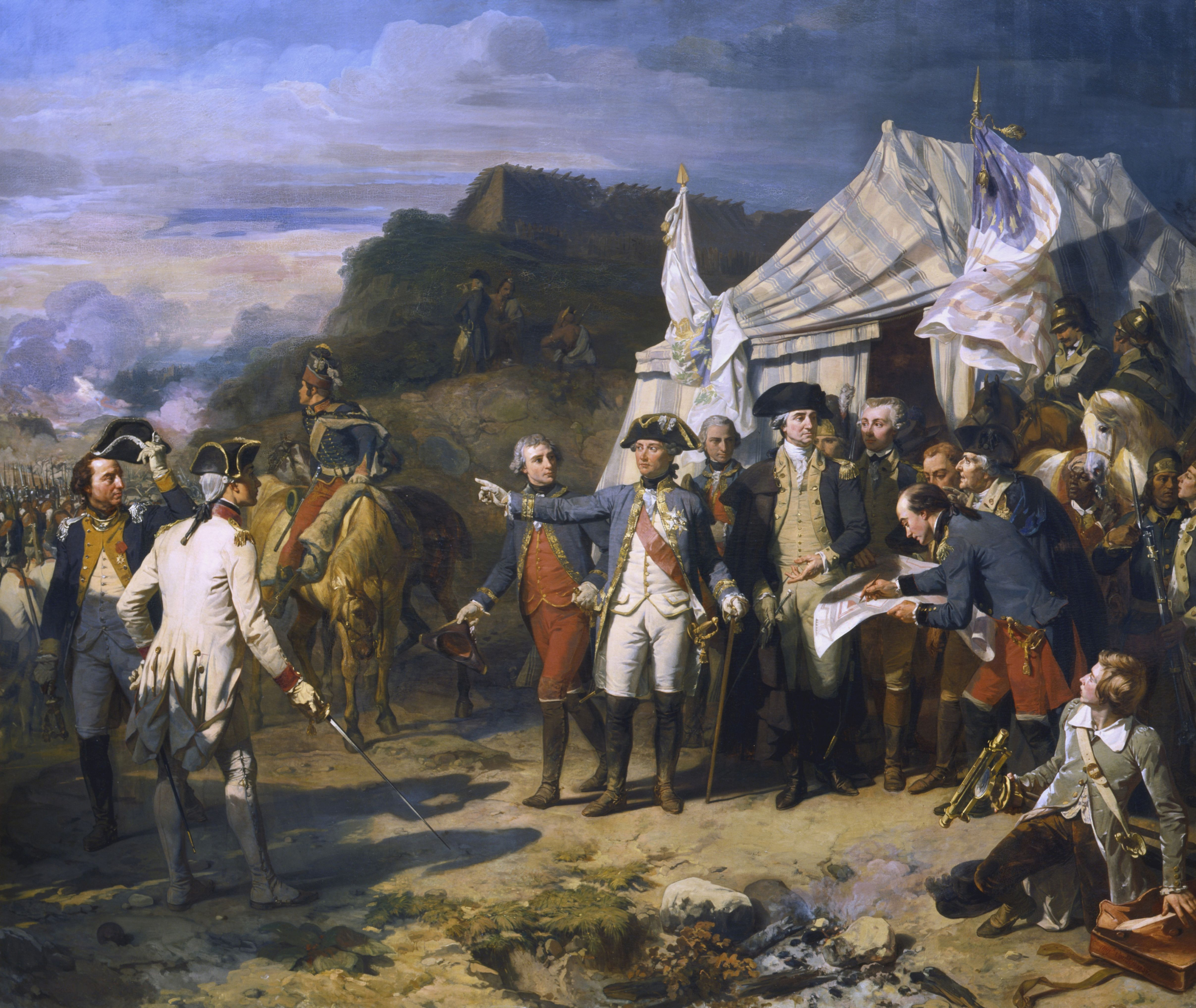
Siege of Yorktown,
oil on canvas, 1836

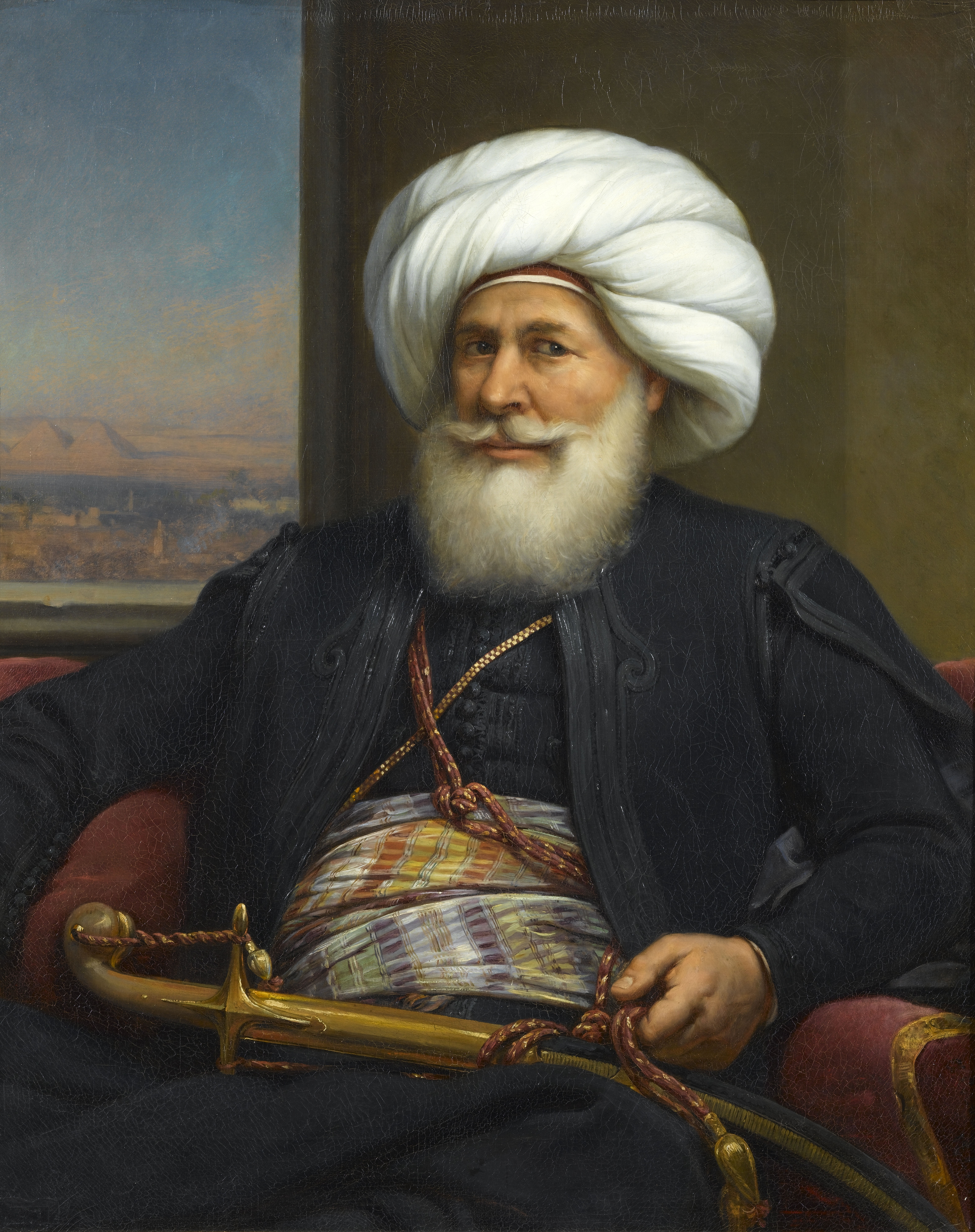
Muhammad Ali of Egypt, 1840

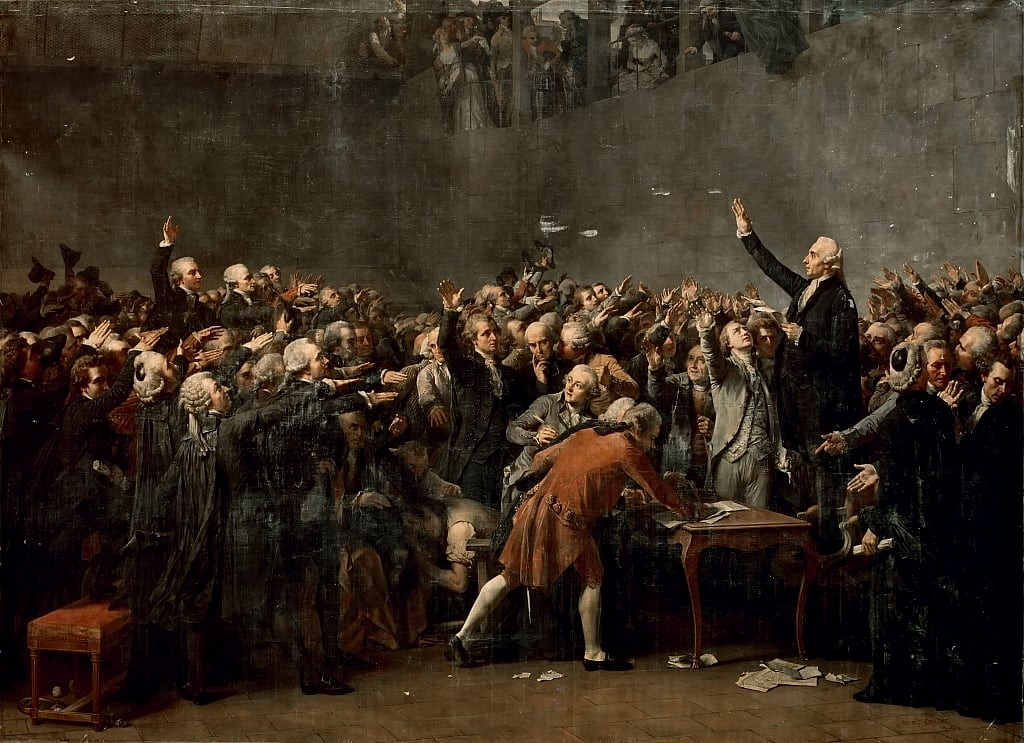
The Tennis Court Oath, 1848

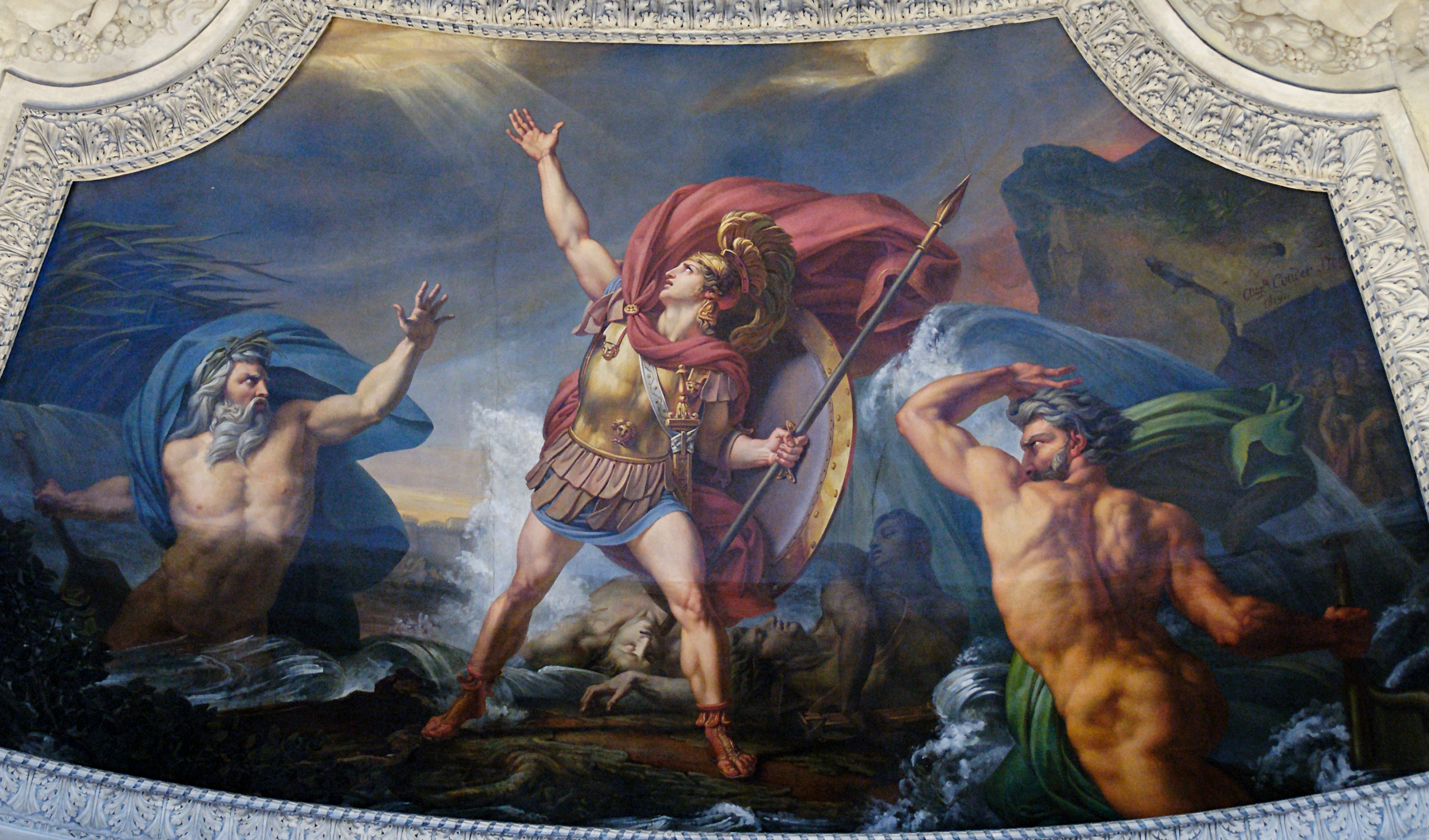
Water, or the Fight of Achilles against Scamander and Simoeis, 1819

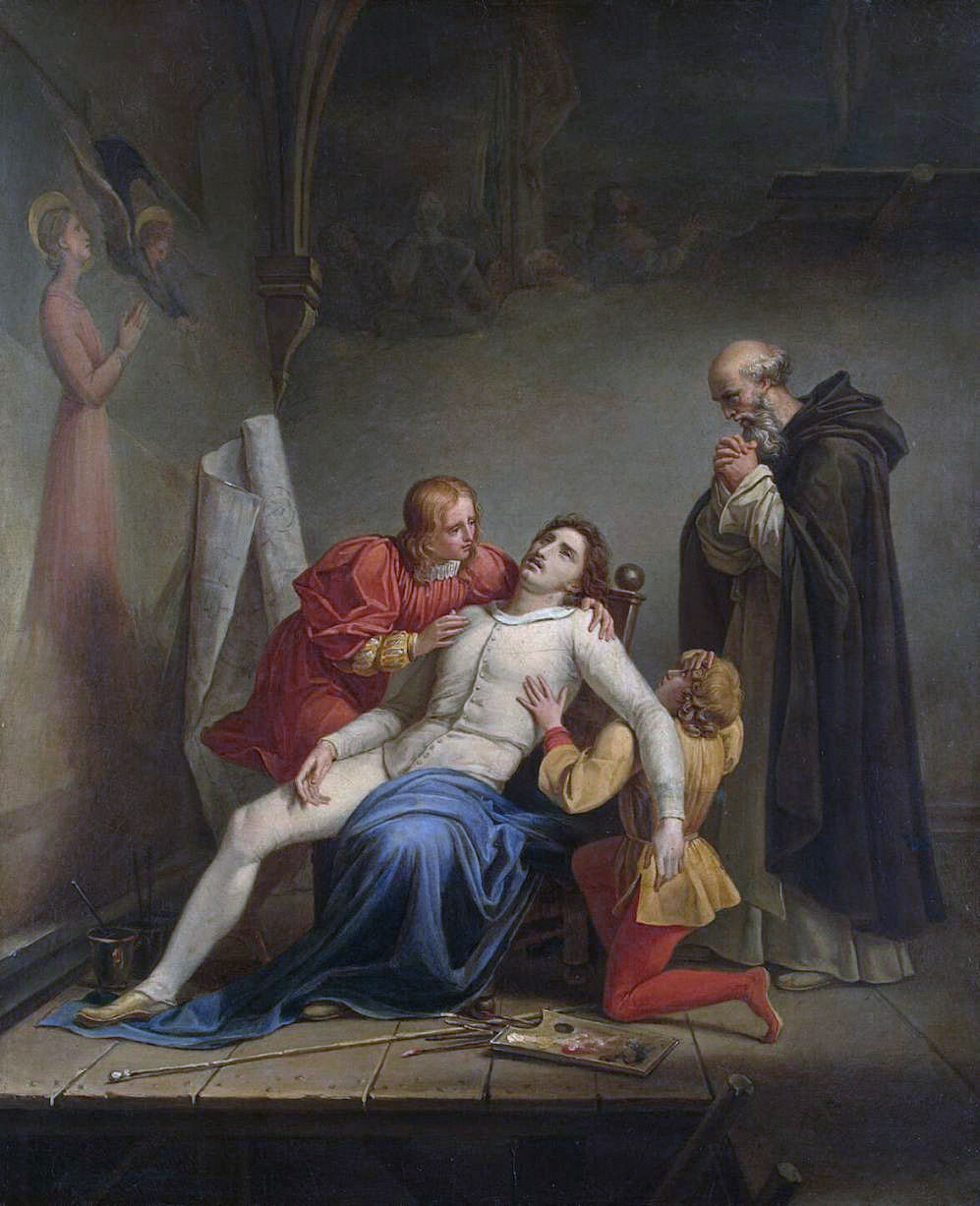
The Death of Masaccio, 1817
