= Feuillant =

Feuillant and its plural Feuillants, a French word derived ultimately from the Latin for "leaf", can refer to the following:

- Les Feuillants Abbey, also known as Feuillant Abbey (Latin: Fulium), a Cistercian monastery in Labastide-Clermont, France
- Congregation of the Feuillants, a Catholic congregation derived from the abbey of the same name; a monk of this order was called a Feuillant, and a nun a Feuillantine
- Convent of the Feuillants (Couvent des Feuillants) in Paris, a monastery belonging to the Congregation of the Feuillants, with its church, the Église des Feuillants
- Feuillant (political group): the Club des Feuillants, a political group of the French Revolution that used the premises of the dissolved Convent of the Feuillants; a member of this group was called a Feuillant
