= Arnaud d'Ossat =

French diplomat and Catholic cardinal (1537–1604)

His Eminence Arnaud d'Ossat
- Bishop of Bayeux
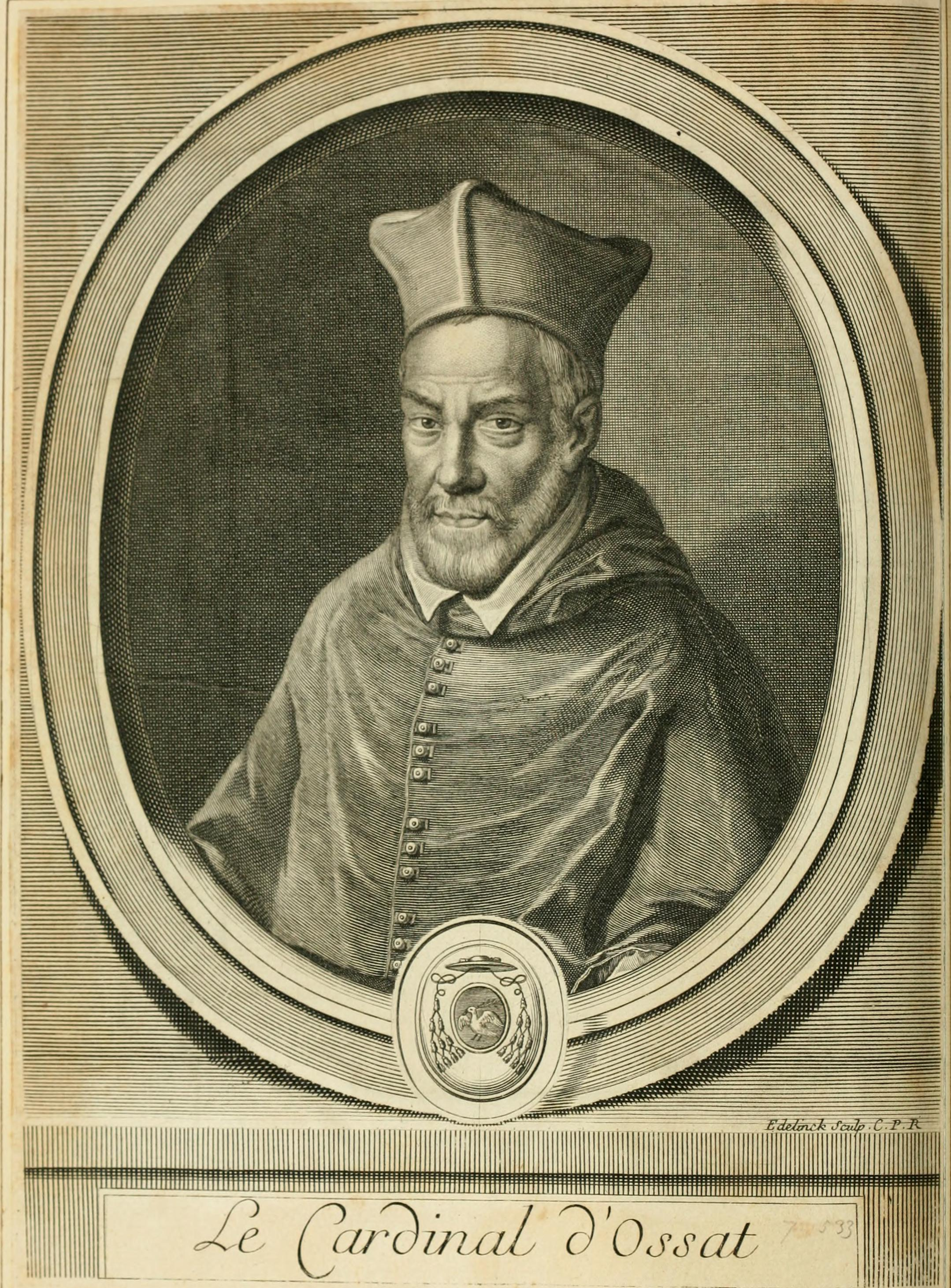
- Church: Catholic Church
- Diocese: Bayeux
- Appointed: 26 June 1600
- Term ended: 13 March 1604
- Predecessor: René de Daillon du Lude
- Successor: Jacques d'Angennes
- Previous posts: Bishop of Rennes (1596–1600)

Orders
- Consecration: 27 October 1596 by Agostino Valier
- Created cardinal: 3 March 1599 by Pope Clement VIII
- Rank: Cardinal-Priest

Personal details
- Born: 20 July 1537 Larroque, France
- Died: 13 March 1604 (aged 66) Rome, Papal States
- Buried: San Luigi dei Francesi
- Coat of arms

Arnaud d'Ossat (20 July 1537 – 13 March 1604) was a French diplomat, writer and a Cardinal of the Roman Catholic Church, whose personal tact and diplomatic skill steered the perilous course of French diplomacy with the papacy in the reign of Henry IV of France.

== Biography ==
=== Early life and studies ===
Arnaud d'Ossat, son of Bernard d'Ossat, was perhaps born at Larroque-Magnoac in Gascony; a contract entered into by M. Arnaud d'Ossat on 22 April 1559 states that he was from La Nogue en Maignac. His mother, Bertrande de Conté, was a native of Cassignebere in Gascony, the property of the Lords of Ramefort. Hence the conjecture (which goes back to Scipion Dupleix' Histoire d' Henri IV of 1635) that Armand was the bastard son of the Lord of Ramefort. Many of the important connections in Ossat's life were with other southerners, the most prominent being Henri IV himself.

On 26 December 1556, he was received into the clergy, by being tonsured by Dominique de Bigorre, Bishop of Albi, administrator of the Diocese of Auch in the name of Cardinal Ippolito d'Este (1551–1563). He was sent first to the nearby College of Auch as tutor to the sons of a local merchant, Thomas de Marca, then, in the first week of May, 1559, to the Collège de France, Paris. There he studied rhetoric and philosophy for more than two years with the famous humanist logician and mathematician Petrus Ramus, who became his friend. He was unfortunately drawn into an academic dispute between his master Ramus and the famous Jacques Charpentier, Rector, Dean, Censor, and finally (in his victory over Ramus) Professor of Medicine and Mathematics at the College Royale (1566). Seeing his own reputation and prospects diminishing as a result of the quarrel, Ossat withdrew to Bourges at the end of 1565 or beginning of 1566. He studied law briefly at Bourges under the famous legist Jacques Cujas, though his legal studies ultimately filled more than two years. He was back in Paris by 8 September 1568, when he wrote to his mother that he was going to practice as an advocate before the Parlement of Paris. Around the same time he agreed to act as a director of the studies of the twenty-three year old Jean de la Barrière, the abbot of the Feuillants and its eventual reformer, who was eager for guidance in the pursuit of an ecclesiastical career.

=== Early Diplomatic Career ===
In 1572 he joined the household of Paul de Foix, Archbishop-elect of Toulouse since 1577, whom he accompanied on various embassies. One of these was certainly the Embassy to Poland for the accession of the Duc d'Anjou as King of Poland in 1573. Immediately after that mission, allegedly to thank all the princes of Italy for their felicitations on the election, King Charles IX sent Foix on an embassy to Italy; the instructions were issued on 7 October 1573. D' Ossat again accompanied him. Their reception at the Papal Curia was not what they had expected. Despite his diplomatic status, Foix found himself under interrogation for his actions and opinions during the events of 1559 leading to the Edict against heresy of 2 June. His orthodoxy was ably defended by d'Ossat in a memoire composed for his defense. However, only too aware of the views and intrigues of his fellow cardinals, Cardinal Prospero Santacroce advised his friend Foix to depart from Rome before any further proceedings could take place. The death of Charles IX on 30 May 1574 provided the appropriate opportunity.

D' Ossat accompanied Msgr. de Foix again on his mission to Rome (1582–1584), where the Archbishop was granted his bulls on 5 November and his pallium on 15 December 1582. Letters of the Archbishop in Rome to the King in France survive. The next Ambassador Ordinary was the Marquis Pitany, who was not received until 1592, after some struggle; this long delay of eight years was due to the irregular status of Henri IV as an heretic; a pope could not enter into direct friendly relations with an heretic, and Sixtus V was violently opposed to Henri IV; he had also excommunicated Henri III for allowing the murders of the Duc de Guise and the Cardinal de Lorraine in 1589. Therefore, after Msgr. de Foix died in Rome on 29 May 1584, d'Ossat remained at the Papal Court in Rome, supervising the French embassy for a year, to the evident satisfaction of King Henri III and Secretary Villeroy, who presented him with a gift of 2,000 ecus on 18 July 1586. They were evidently impressed by the report of the Bishop of Paris, Pierre de Gondi, who had been in Rome in early 1586, attempting to smooth over difficulties between Pope Sixtus V and the French Ambassador Marquis Pitany.

D'Ossat then became secretary to Cardinal Luigi d'Este, the Protector of France before the Holy See, who, unfortunately, died on 30 December 1586. He was succeeded a month later, on 16 February 1587, by Cardinal François de Joyeuse, who took charge of French affairs upon his arrival in Rome on 20 August 1587, and who also enjoyed Ossat's services as secretary. Ossat was ordained to the priesthood around this time, perhaps at the end of 1587; Jacques de Thou wrote that Ossat had written a letter to Henri III in 1588 that he had received ordination.

In 1588 he refused the post of Minister of Foreign Affairs to Henry III, after the King had dismissed all of his secretaries of state, including Villeroy. The refusal was made, no doubt, out of a sense of loyalty to his friend and patron, Villeroy. Then, the Cardinal de Joyeuse and d' Ossat were driven from Rome by the rupture of diplomatic relations with the Pope after the murder of Charles de Guise, Cardinal of Lorraine (1588), but they returned after the murder of Henry III on 2 August 1589 by the Dominican friar Jacques Clément. D'Ossat thereupon undertook to serve as the private agent) procurator) in Rome of the widowed queen, Louise de Vaudemont.

=== Ossat, Henri IV, and Rome ===
He used his unofficial position to support the cause of Henry IV, whose conversion to Catholicism he prepared Pope Clement VIII to accept. On 1 August 1593, Henri IV wrote directly to d' Ossat in Rome that he was sending the Duc de Nevers to negotiate with the Pope, and he instructed d'Ossat to share all of his knowledge of and influence in the Roman Court, as well as his wise counsel, to advance the affairs of France. Shortly before the arrival of Nevers in Rome, the French faced the verbal onslaught of a Spanish chamberlain of the Pope, Gonzalez Ponce de Leon, in the form of a memoire arguing that the pope did not have the authority to absolve a relapsed heretic (such as Henri IV). When it appeared that Clement VIII was impressed by the arguments, D' Ossat undertook to reply to the Spanish chamberlain in a memoire of his own. The arguments, summarized by de Thou in his history, convinced the Pope, who, in the end, preferred to believe that he had more power than less power. Unofficial negotiations therefore continued. As Envoy Extraordinary for Henri, cooperating with Jacques Davy du Perron, Bishop of Évreux, he negotiated the reconciliation of the King with the Roman Catholic Church and the Pope, which took place on 19 September 1595. This was the greatest act of d'Ossat's diplomatic career, assuring as it did the definitive triumph of Henri IV over the House of Guise and the Catholic League, and the restoration of peace to France after more than thirty years of civil war (see French Wars of Religion).

=== Episcopate ===
In January 1596, King Henri IV named d' Ossat Bishop of Rennes. The bishop's letter of thanks to the King is dated 20 February 1596. It was not until the Consistory of Monday, 9 September 1596, however, that Pope Clement VIII authorized the issue of the appropriate bulls authorizing his consecration. He was consecrated in Rome on Sunday, 27 October, in the Church of S. Marco, by Cardinal Agostino Valier, Bishop of Verona. The co-consecrators were Guillaume d'Avançon, Archbishop of Embrun, and Francesco Serini, Bishop of Bagnoregio. Ossat remained at Rome, without any well-defined office, though he was charged with occasional missions to Venice and Florence (1598), and managed the French embassy in the absence of a noble ambassador, as professional diplomats traditionally do, and was always the enlightened and devoted representative of French interests. All the ambassadors of Henry IV had orders to make known to him the business with which they were charged and to be guided by his advice. Villeroy, Henri's minister of foreign affairs, himself consulted him on all matters in any way connected with Rome.

Ossat was pleased to be notified, by a letter and brevet of 6 September 1597, that King Henri IV had named him a Councillor of State.

=== Cardinalate ===
He was created cardinal priest, on the recommendation of King Henri IV of France, in the consistory of 3 March 1599. Later, in the Consistory of 17 March 1599, he was granted the title of S. Eusebio. Ossat was also promoted to the Diocese of Bayeux, a richer and more prestigious benefice, on 26 June 1600. On 4 August 1600, he took possession of the diocese through his procurator, Pierre Ruel, Councillor of the Parlement of Paris, but he never visited his new diocese in person. Only one week before his death, he received permission from the King to relinquish his episcopal throne.

In 1602, he consecrated the Church of San Bernardo alle Terme.

A measure of Ossat's skill and tact may be gained by the French measures he was able to present successfully to the Holy See: the expulsion of the Jesuits from France, the indefinite postponement of the publication of the decrees of the Council of Trent, the Edict of Nantes, and French alliances with England and even with the Sultan of Turkey, the annulment of Henry IV's marriage with Margaret of Valois, and the marriage of the Duc de Bar with Catherine of Navarre, the king's sister and an unrepentant Calvinist.

At the same time d'Ossat used his influence at Rome for the benefit of French humanists: the historian Jacques-Auguste de Thou (witness to the St. Bartholomew's Day Massacres), the philosopher Michel de Montaigne, and the savant Nicolas Claude Fabri de Peiresc.

=== Death ===
Cardinal d'Ossat died on 13 March 1604 (his tombstone says 14 March) in Rome, after brief illness. He was buried in the church of San Luigi dei Francesi, near the Piazza Navona. His tomb is still to be seen, though the inscription is a substitute, ca. 1763, for the original, which was destroyed during renovations of the church. Cardinal Guido Bentivoglio (1579–1644) said of him that never was a man more worthy of the cardinal's hat, because of his religious zeal, the integrity of his morals, and the eminence of his learning.

In the course of his diplomatic career Ossat wrote many letters and memoranda, a selection of which, printed in 1614, long served as models for diplomats, owing not only to the importance of the questions which they treat but especially to the talent for exposition which Ossat displays in them. The Académie Française inscribed Ossat among the "dead authors who have written our French language most purely", and Lord Chesterfield wrote to his son that the "simplicity and clearness of Cardinal d'Ossat's letters show how business letters should be written".

== Bibliography ==
- Arnaud d' Ossat, Expositio Arnaldi Ossati in disputationem Jacobi Carpentarii de Methodo (Parisiis: Apud Andream Wechelum 1564).
- Arnaud d' Ossat, Arnaldi Ossati Additio ad expositionem de methodo (Parisiis: apud A. Wechselum 1564).
- Arnaud d' Ossat, Addition De Qvelqves Lettres De L'Illvstrissime Cardinal D'Ossat; Par luy dressées sous le nom de l'Illustrissime Cardinal de Ioyeuse (Paris: Ioseph Bouillerot, 1626).
- L. Boulanger (editor), Lettres du Cardinal d'Ossat au roy Henry le Grand et à Monsieur de Villeroy depuis l'année 1594 jusques à l'année 1604 revised and augmented (Paris: L. Boulanger, 1627).
- Marie-Geneviève-Charlotte Thiroux d' Arconville, Vie du cardinal d'Ossat 2 vols. (Paris: Herissant le fils, 1771).
- Abraham Nicolas Amelot de La Houssaie (editor), Lettres du cardinal d'Ossat: Avec des notes historiques et politiques de Amelot de La Houssaye 5 volumes (Amsterdam: chez Pierre Humbert, 1708).
- Philippe Tamizey de Larroque (editor), Lettres inédites du cardinal d'Ossat (Paris: Auguste Aubry, 1872).
- Giuseppe Canestrini (editor), Négociations diplomatiques de la France avec la Toscane Tome V (Paris: Imprimerie nationale 1875).
- Antoine Degert, Le cardinal d'Ossat, evêque de Rennes et de Bayeux (1537–1604) (Paris: Victor Lecoffre 1894).
- Remi Couzard, Une ambassade à Rome sous Henri IV (Septembre 1601-Juin 1605): d'après des documents inédits (Tonneins: Impr. G. Ferrier, 1900).
- Louis Dollot, Les cardinaux-ministres sous la monarchie française (Paris: Dominique Walper, 1952).
- Nicola Mary Sutherland, Henry IV of France and the Politics of Religion: The path to Rome (Bristol UK-Portland OR: Elm Bank-Intellect Books, 2002).
- Maria Teresa Fattori, Clemente VIII e il Sacro Collegio 1592-1605: meccanismi istituzionali ed accentramento di governo (Stuttgart: Hiersemann, 2004).
