= Joseph Souberbielle =

French surgeon

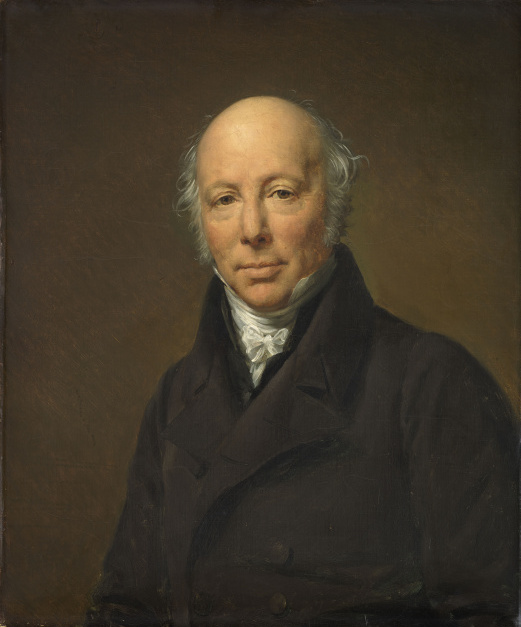

Joseph Souberbielle (18 March 1754 in Pontacq – 10 July 1846 in Paris) was a French surgeon. He was a relative of Jean Baseilhac (1703–1781), a surgeon who was a major influence to Souberbielle's career.

He moved to Paris in 1774, where he was student of Pierre-Joseph Desault (1738–1795). Afterwards, he worked as a military physician, subsequently serving as chief surgeon for the victors of the Bastille (1789). In 1793 he was a juror of the Revolutionary Tribunal.

Known for his work in lithotomy, especially using the suprapubic method. It is believed that he performed over 1200 suprapubic operations for removal of calculi during his career. As did Jean Baseilhac, he advocated use of a caustic paste containing arsenic for cauterization of cancers. The mixture found particular use in treatment of facial ulcers. During the French revolution he was a close associate of Maximilien Robespierre and narrowly survived being guillotined in the events of 9 thermidor 1794.

== Selected works ==
- Considerations medico-chirurgicales sur les maladies des voies urinaires, 1813 - Medico-surgical considerations on urinary tract diseases.
- Opérations de cystotomie suspubienne, ca. 1827 - Operations of suprapubic cystotomy.
- Lettre à l'Académie des sciences, sur la statistique des affections calculeuses présentée par M. Civiale dans la séance du 26 août 1833 - Letter to the Academy of Sciences regarding statistics of calculous affections, etc.
- Recueil de pièces sur la lithotomie et la lithotritie, 1835 - Collection of pieces involving lithotomy and lithotripsy.
