= Jean de la Barrière =

French abbot (1544–1600)

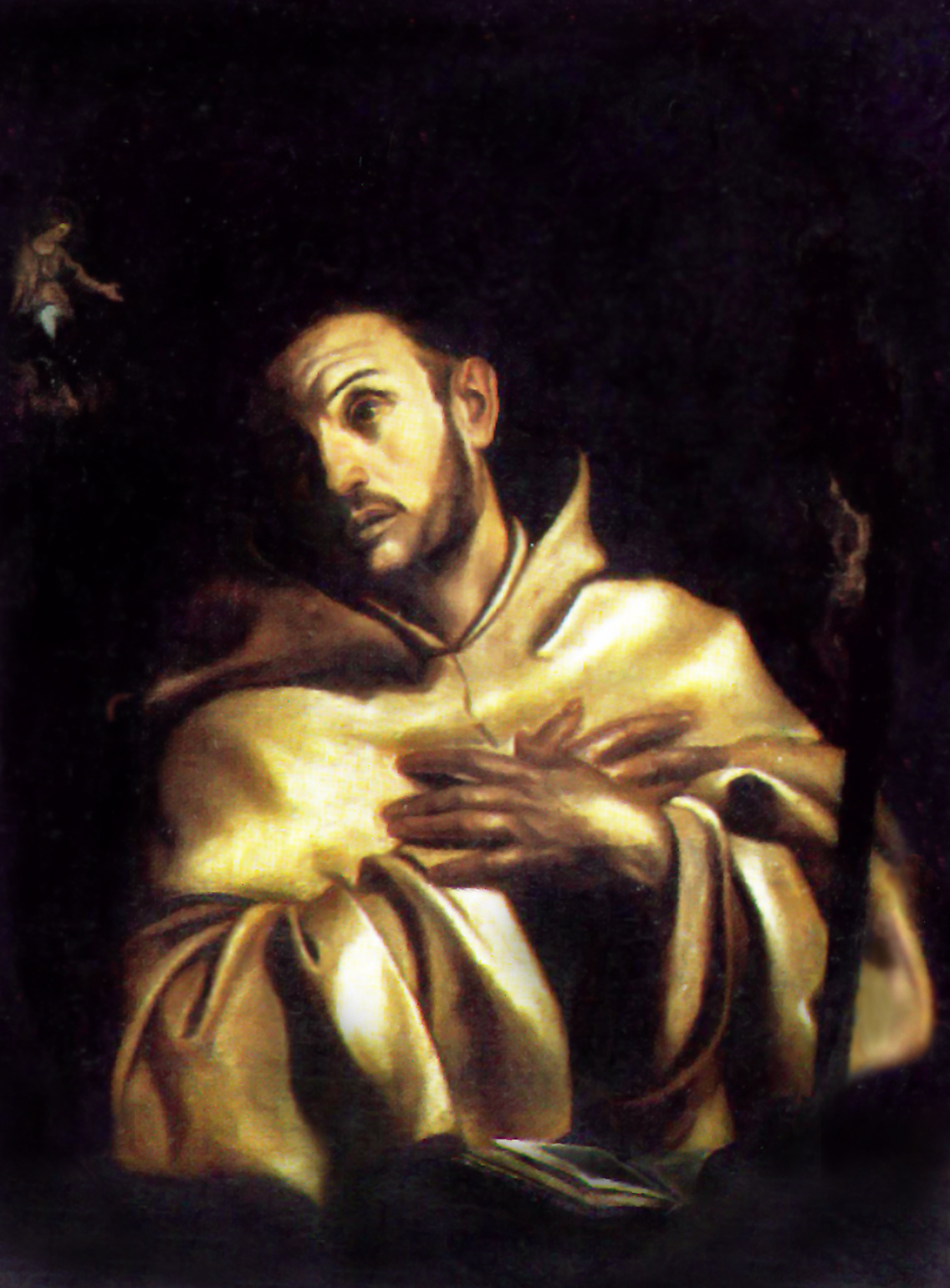
Jean de La Barrière

Jean Baptiste de la Barrière (French pronunciation: [ʒɑ̃ də la baʁjɛʁ]; 1544–1600) was the founder of the reformed Cistercian order, the Feuillants. During his life he became a spiritual adviser to King Henry III of France. During 1587 Henry III built a monastery for the Feuillants to commemorate his friendship with Jean.

== Life ==
Jean Baptiste de la Barrière was born at Saint Cerd in 1544. At the age of nineteen he was made commendatory abbot of Les Feuillants Abbey. In 1568 he went to Paris and then began his lifelong friendship with Arnaud d'Ossat, who agreed to act as a director of his studies.

In 1573 Barrière, having decided to introduce a reform into his abbey, became a novice there himself, and after obtaining the necessary dispensations, made his solemn profession and was ordained priest, some time after 8 May 1573. His was not an easy task. The twelve monks at Les Feuillants, despite the example and exhortations of their abbot, refused to accept the reform, which they disliked so greatly that they tried to poison him. Their resistance, however, was futile. In 1577 Barrière received the abbatial benediction, re-stated his intention of reforming his monastery, and made the members of the community understand that they had either to accept the reform or leave the abbey; most chose to do the latter and dispersed to various other Cistercian houses, leaving a community of five persons: two professed clerics, two novices, and Barrière himself.

The reform that caused such strong feeling consisted of an ascetic interpretation of the Cistercian rule. Jean lived a patient, compassionate life and adopted routines such as sleeping on the floor with a stone pillow and eating without tables. Jean did not eat fish or eggs, nor did he allow his followers to do so. The Feuillants used herbs for sacred rituals. In 1581 Barrière received from Pope Gregory XIII a brief of commendation and in 1589 one of confirmation, which established the Feuillants as a congregation separate from the Cistercian order.

In 1587 Pope Sixtus V called the Feuillants to Rome, where he gave them the Church of Santa Pudentiana. In the same year, King Henry III of France built for them the monastery of St. Bernard, commonly known as Saint-Bernard-de-la-Pénitence or the Couvent des Feuillants, with its church, the Église des Feuillants, in the Rue Saint-Honoré, Paris.

However, the religious wars brought dissension: while Barrière remained loyal to Henry III, preaching his funeral oration at Bordeaux, the majority of his religious declared for the Catholic League. By the end of the French Wars of Religion in 1598, the convent held only nine monks, but enjoyed the favour of the new King, Henry IV, who put the convent under his protection.

== Rome ==
In 1598, Caterina Sforza di Santafiora, niece of Pope Julius III, had San Bernardo alle Terme built for the Feuillants.

Jean died in 1600 in the arms of his friend Arnaud d'Ossat, now a cardinal. Abbot de la Barrière was buried to the left of the main altar in the Church of San Bernardo. He was given the title of Venerable.

== See also ==
- Congregation of the Feuillants
