= Congregation of the Feuillants =

Former Catholic congregation and order

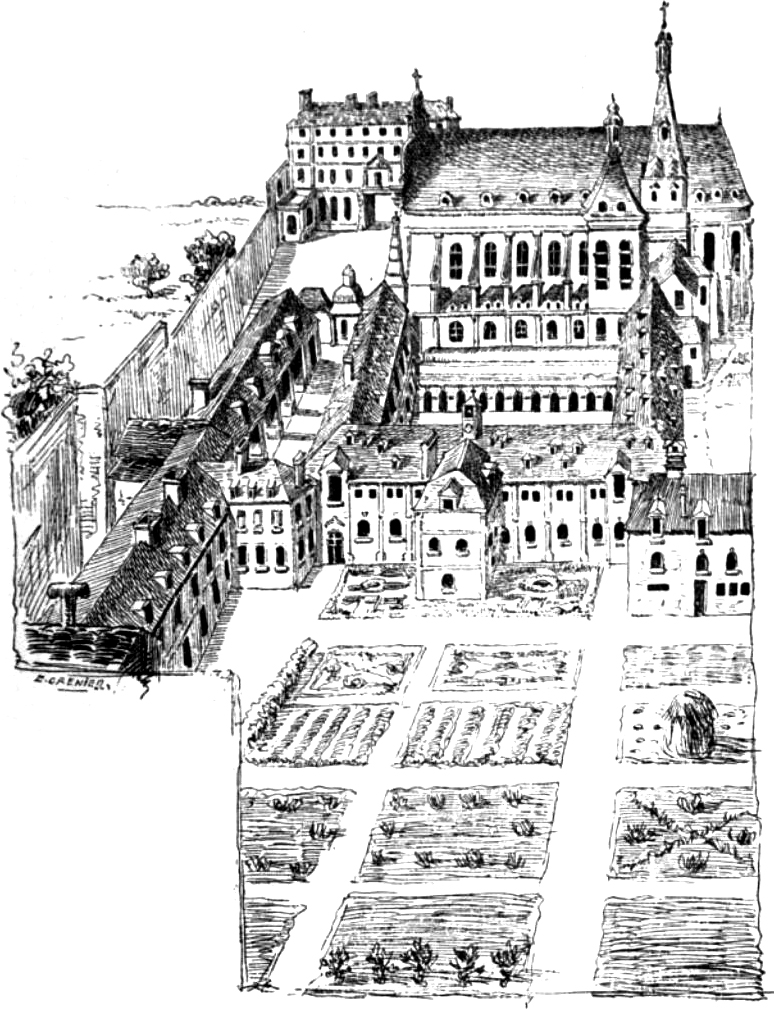
Convent of the Feuillants, Paris

The Feuillants were a Catholic congregation originating in the 1570s as a reform group within the Cistercians in its namesake Les Feuillants Abbey in France, which declared itself an independent order.

In 1630 it separated into a French branch (the Congregation of Our Lady of the Feuillants) and an Italian branch (the Reformed Bernardines or Bernardoni).

The French order was suppressed in 1791 during the French Revolution, but gave its name to the Club des Feuillants. The Italian order later rejoined the Cistercians.

== History ==
Les Feuillants Abbey, the Cistercian abbey near Toulouse (Haute-Garonne) from which the order took its name, was founded in 1145. It passed into the hands of commendatory abbots in 1493, and in that way came in 1562 to Jean de la Barrière (1544-1600). After his nomination he went to Paris to continue his studies, and then began his lifelong friendship with Arnaud d'Ossat, later cardinal. In 1573 Barrière, having decided to introduce a reform into his abbey, became a novice there himself, and after obtaining the necessary dispensations, made his solemn profession and was ordained priest, some time after 8 May 1573.

His was not an easy task. The twelve monks at Les Feuillants, despite the example and exhortations of their abbot, refused to accept the reform, which they disliked so greatly that they tried to poison him. Their resistance, however, was futile. In 1577 Barrière received the abbatial blessing, re-stated his intention of reforming his monastery, and made the members of the community understand that they had either to accept the reform or leave the abbey; most chose to do the latter and dispersed to various other Cistercian houses, leaving a community of five: two professed clerics, two novices, and Barrière himself.

The reform that caused such strong feeling consisted of an ascetic interpretation of the Cistercian rule in its most rigid sense and in many ways exceeded even that.

1. The Feuillants renounced the use of wine, fish, eggs, butter, salt, and all seasoning. Their nourishment consisted of barley bread, herbs cooked in water, and oatmeal.
2. Tables were abolished; they ate on the floor kneeling.
3. They kept the plain white Cistercian habit, but remained bare-headed and barefoot in the monastery.
4. They slept on the ground or on bare planks, with a stone for a pillow, and slept for only four hours.

In addition, silence and manual labour were prized. Despite, or perhaps because of, this austere regime, the community grew with the admission of fervent postulants.

In 1581 Barrière received from Pope Gregory XIII a brief of commendation and in 1589 one of confirmation, which established the Feuillants as a congregation separate from the Cistercian order, the abbots and general chapters of which mostly opposed it fiercely. Their opposition did not prevent the reform from flourishing.

In 1587 Pope Sixtus V called the Feuillants to Rome, where he gave them the Church of Santa Pudentiana. In the same year, King Henry III of France built for them the monastery of St. Bernard, more commonly known as the Convent of the Feuillants (Saint-Bernard-de-la-Pénitence or the Couvent des Feuillants), with its church, the Église des Feuillants, in the Rue Saint-Honoré, Paris. In 1590, however, the religious wars brought dissension: while Barrière remained loyal to Henry III, the majority of his religious declared for the Catholic League, in which they were extremely active: Bernard de Montgaillard, known as the "Petit Feuillant", particularly stood out by the vehemence of his sermons. Once the troubles were over, the Feuillants nevertheless enjoyed the favour of the new King, Henry IV, whom they had previously opposed.

Barrière however had been condemned in 1592 as a traitor to the Catholic cause, deposed, and reduced to the lay state. Only in 1600, through the efforts of Cardinal Bellarmine, was he exonerated and reinstated, but he died early in the same year in the arms of his friend Cardinal d'Ossat.

Monks such as Dom Sans de Sainte-Catherine and Dom Eustache de Saint-Paul became notable as great spiritual directors during what Brémond has called l'invasion mystique ("the mystical invasion").

In 1595 Pope Clement VIII exempted the reform from all jurisdiction on the part of Cistercian abbots, and allowed the Feuillants to draw up new constitutions, containing some relaxations of the initial austerities. These were approved the same year.

In 1598 the Feuillants took possession of a second monastery in Rome, San Bernardo alle Terme. In 1630 Pope Urban VIII divided the congregation into two entirely separate branches: one in France, under the title of the Congregation of Notre-Dame des Feuillants; and one in Italy, under the name of Bernardoni or Reformed Bernardines. In 1634 the Feuillants of France, and in 1667 the Bernardines of Italy, further modified the constitutions of 1595.

During the French Revolution, in 1791, when the Feuillants were suppressed along with the other religious orders of France, the congregation had twenty-four abbeys in France, but not more than 162 members. The Reformed Bernardines of Italy eventually rejoined the Cistercian order.

The order also had women religious, known as the Feuillantines, established in 1588 and abolished in 1791, who had only two houses, one founded at Montesquieu-Volvestre in 1588 and later moved to Toulouse, and the other founded in Paris in 1622 in the Faubourg Saint-Jacques.

The Constituante of 1789-1791 took the former monastic premises in Paris for its offices. The buildings were also used for their meetings by, and gave their name to, the conservative Club des Feuillants, a political club (1791-1792) which united moderates and constitutional monarchists. From 10 to 12 August 1792 the former monastery accommodated Louis XVI and his family.

== Notable members ==
Some of the more distinguished Feuillants were:

- Antoinette d'Orléans-Longueville (1572–1618) as Sister Antoinette of Saint Scholastica
- Eustachius a Sancto Paulo (d. 1640), author of the influential Summa Philosophiae (1609) admired by René Descartes.
- Cardinal Bona, liturgist and ascetical writer (d. 1674)
- Gabriele de Castello (d. 1687), general of the Italian branch, also a cardinal
- Charles de Saint-Paul, first general of the Feuillants of France, afterwards Bishop of Avranches, who published in 1641 the "Geographia Sacra"
- Pierre Comagère, theologian (d. 1662)
- Laurent Apisius, theologian (d. 1681)
- Jean Goulu, theologian (d. 1629)
- Bernard de Montgaillard, preacher, later abbot of Orval
- Brother Cosmas, otherwise Jean Baseilhac, surgeon and lithotomist
- Carlo Giuseppe Morozzi (Morotius), author of the most important history of the order, the "Cistercii reflores centis … chronologica historia".

== Monasteries ==
Among the congregation's houses were:

- Les Feuillants Abbey (Abbaye Notre-Dame des Feuillants) (Labastide-Clermont, Haute-Garonne)
- Abbaye Notre-Dame du Val (Mériel, Val-d'Oise)
- Micy Abbey (Abbaye Saint-Mesmin de Micy) (Saint-Pryvé-Saint-Mesmin, Loiret)
- Abbaye d'Abondance, (Abondance, Haute-Savoie)
- Abbaye Notre-Dame la Blanche (Selles-sur-Cher, Loir-et-Cher)
- Lachalade Abbey (Abbaye de Lachalade) (Lachalade, Meuse)
- San Bernardo alle Terme (Rome)
- Valvisciolo Abbey (Abbazia di Valvisciolo) (Sermoneta, Lazio)
- Convent of the Feuillants, Blérancourt (Aisne) (Couvents des Feuillants, Blérancourt)
- Convent of the Feuillants, Paris (Couvent des Feuillants, Paris)

== Sources ==
- Ariew, Roger. Descartes and the First Cartesians. Oxford: Oxford University Press, 2014. ISBN 9780199563517
- Catholic Encyclopedia: Feuillants
- Nouveau Larousse Illustrée; Dictionnaire Universel encyclopédique, volume 4 (E-G), 1900
- Duval, André, 2000: Dictionnaire de l'Histoire du Christianisme, Paris, Encyclopédia Universalis ISBN 978-2-7028-2976-9
