= San Bernardo alle Terme =

- St. Bernard at the baths; Sancti Bernardi ad Thermas
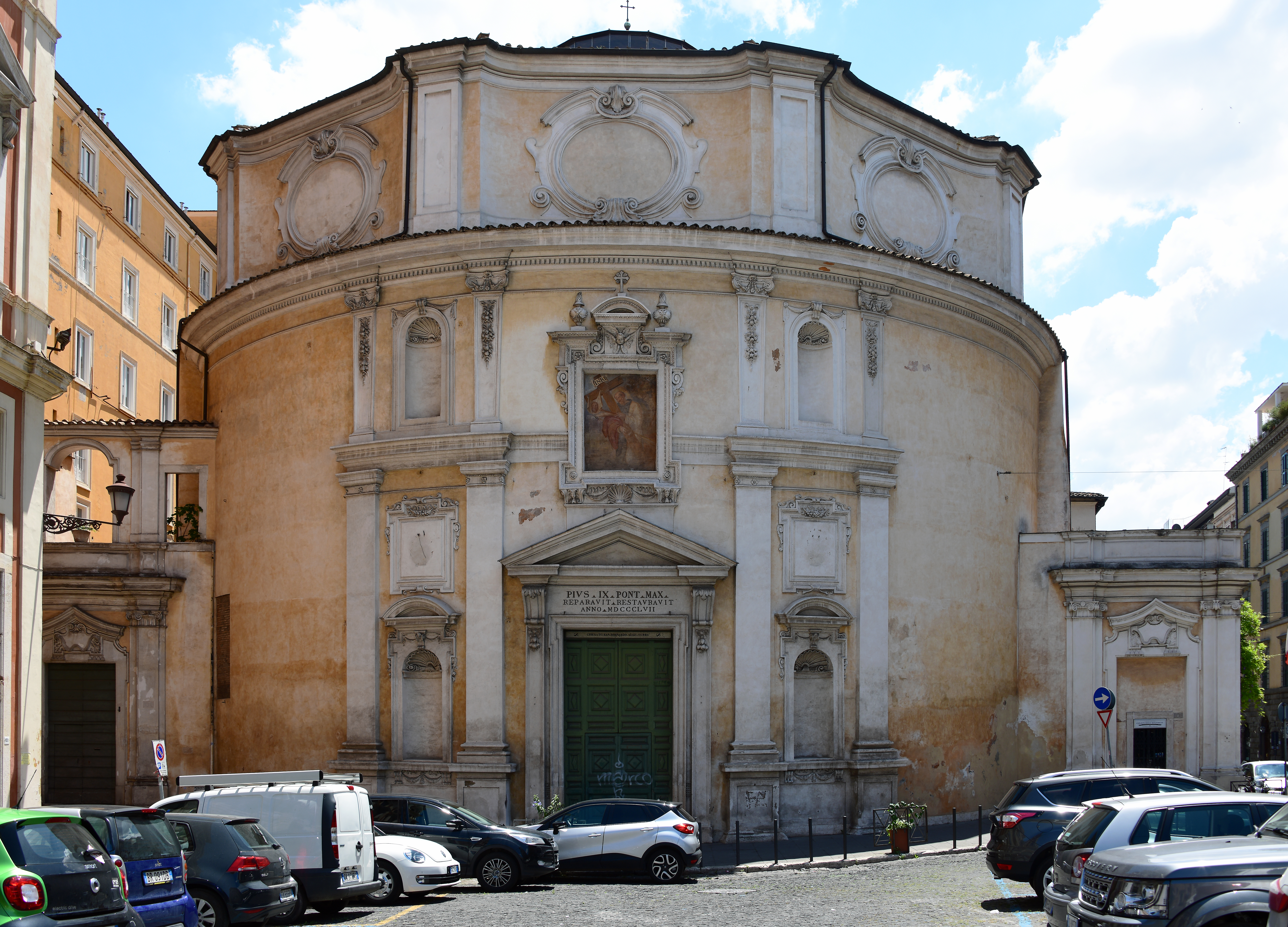
- Façade of San Bernardo
- Click on the map to see marker
- 41°54′13″N 12°29′40″E
- Location: Rome
- Country: Italy
- Language: Italian
- Denomination: Catholic Church
- Sui iuris church: Latin Church
- Tradition: Roman Rite
- Religious order: Cistercians

History
- Status: Titular church

Architecture
- Architectural type: Baroque architecture

San Bernardo alle Terme is a Baroque style, Catholic abbatial church located on Via Torino 94 in the rione Castro Pretorio of Rome, Italy. It is administered by the Cistercians.

== History ==
The church was built on the remains of a circular tower, which marked a corner in the southwestern perimeter wall of the Baths of Diocletian (its symmetrically matched tower is today part of a hotel building, 225 meters southeast from San Bernardo alle Terme). These two towers flanked a large semicircular exedra; the distance between the towers attests to enormous scale of the original structure.

In 1598, under the patronage of Caterina Sforza di Santafiora, niece of Pope Julius III, this church was built for the French Cistercian group, the Feuillants, under the leadership of Giovanni Barreiro, abbot of Toulouse.

In 1602, the church was consecrated by Cardinal Arnaud d'Ossat, a friend of Abbot Jean de la Barrière.

in 1670, Giovanni Bona was named Cardinal priest of San Bernardo and began a thorough restoration of the church. Eight stucco statues of saints, each housed in wall niches, are the work of Camillo Mariani. They depict the saints Augustine of Hippo, Monica, Mary Magdalene, Francis of Assisi, Bernard, Catherine of Alexandria, Catherine of Siena, and Jerome. These are a good example of the late Mannerist sculpture. Mariani's figures are particularly praised for their chiaroscuro effects and bold modeling.

As Cardinal-priest, Domenico Silvio Passionei had an apartment built on the second floor of the monastery. Intended for use during annual spiritual devotions, it was also used to entertain friends and house a collection of books and impressive portrait prints.

Later, after the dissolution of the Feuillants during the French Revolution, the edifice and the annexed monastery were ceded to the Congregation of St. Bernard of Clairvaux, after whom the church is named.

The abbey was sequestered by the Italian government in 1872, and used as army barracks for several years. In 1901 it was demolished to make way for the Via Torino.

The current Cardinal Priest of the Titulus S. Bernardi ad Thermas is George Alencherry.

== Art and architecture ==
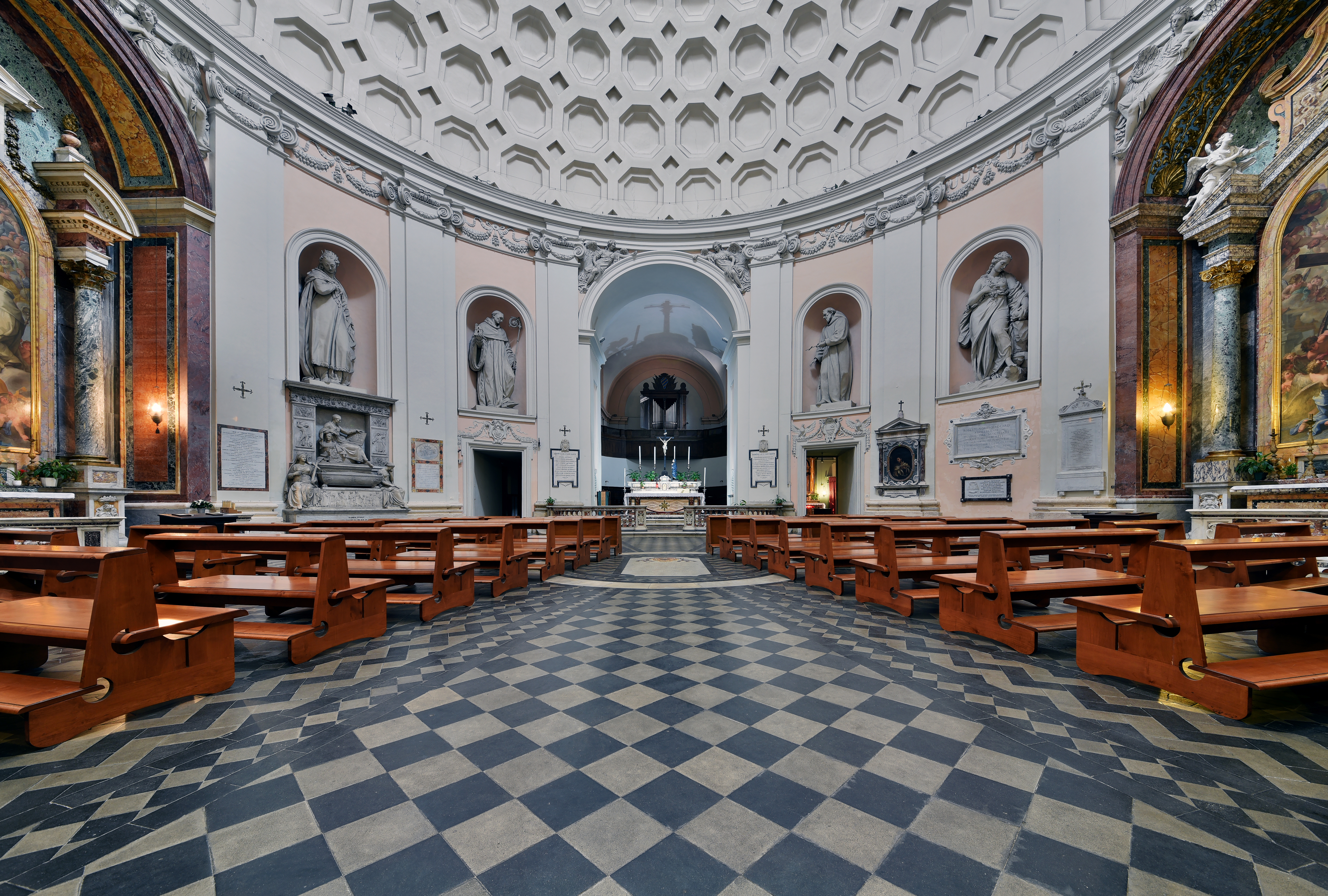
The church

The structure of San Bernardo alle Terme is similar to the Pantheon, since it is cylindrical, with a dome and an oculus. Devoid of windows, it receives natural light only from the large circular hole (impluvium) placed in the center of the octagonal dome. The edifice has a diameter of 22 meters. The octagonal dome coffers recall those of the Basilica of Maxentius.

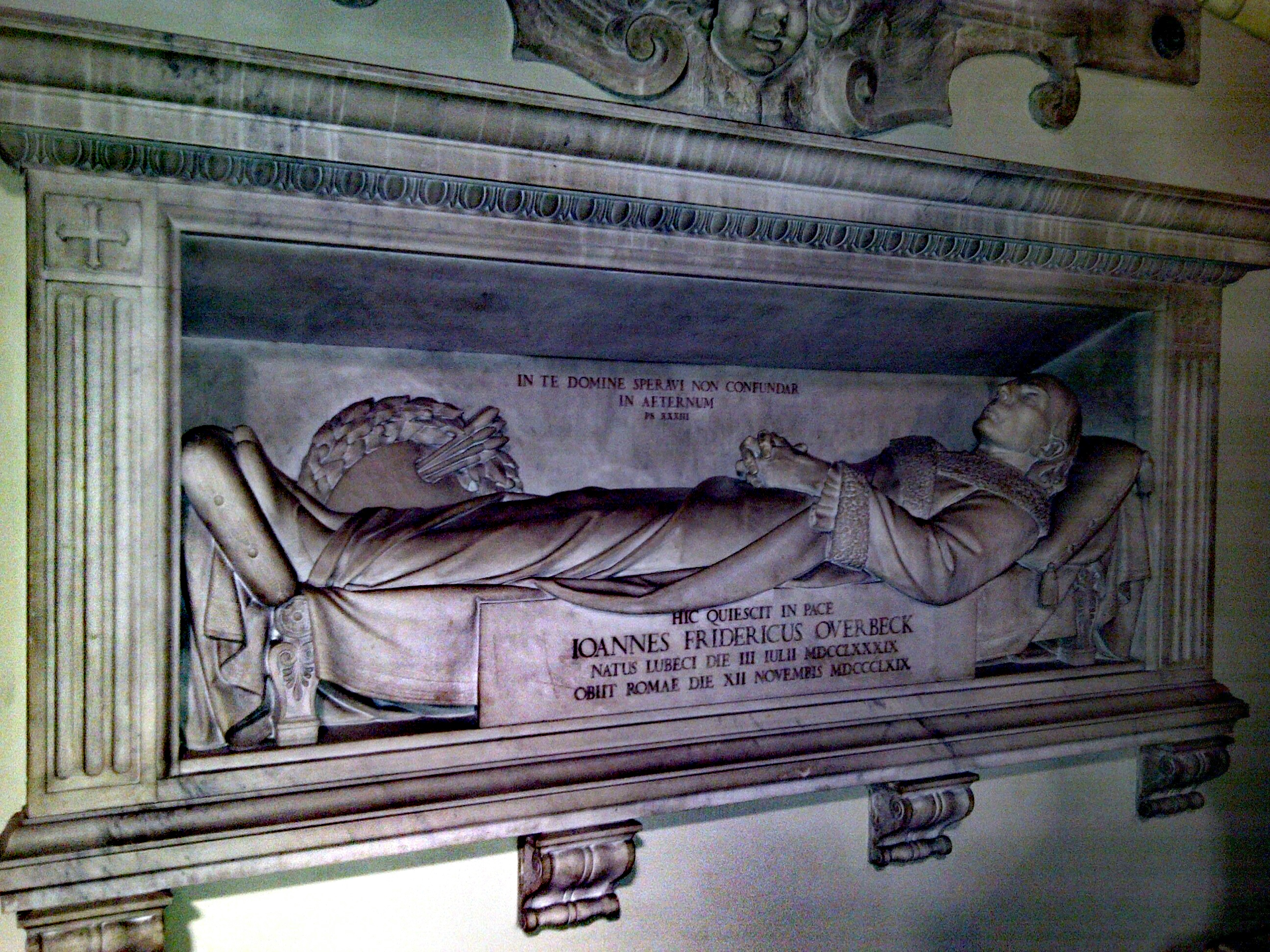
Tomb of Johann Friedrich Overbeck

The Chapel of St Francis is an addition to the ancient rotunda, and contains a sculpture of St Francis by Giacomo Antonio Fancelli. The German painter Johann Friedrich Overbeck, founder of the Nazarene art movement, is buried here.

The left side altar is dedicated to Robert of Molesme; right to Bernard of Clairvaux. The large canvases are by Giovanni Odazzi.

== Burials ==
- Abbot Jean de la Barrière (†1600) is left of the main altar;
- Cardinal Francesco Sforza (†1624)
- Cardinal Giovanni Bona (†1674)
- Frédéric Napoléon Baciocchi Levoy (†1833) son of Elisa Bonaparte, Grand Duchess of Tuscany.

== List of cardinal protectors ==
This church is the seat of cardinalatial title of S. Bernardi ad Thermas.

- Giovanni Bona, O.Cist., (19 May 1670 – 28 October 1674)
- Galeazzo Marescotti, (23 March 1676 – 22 September 1681)
- Giambattista Costaguti, (10 April 1690 – 12 November 1691)
- Urbano Sacchetti, (22 December 1693 – 14 January 1704)
- Lorenzo Casoni, (25 June 1706 – 21 January 1715)
- Francesco Barberini, (6 May 1715 – 11 May 1718)
- Bernardo Maria Conti, (16 July 1721 – 23 April 1730)
- Henri-Pons de Thiard de Bissy, (14 August 1730 – 26 July 1737)
- Domenico Silvio Passionei, (23 July 1738 – 17 February 1755; 17 February 1755 – 5 July 1761)
- Ignazío Michele Crivelli, (17 August 1761 – 29 February 1768)
- Gennaro Antonio de Simone, (19 April 1793 – 16 December 1780)
- Giuseppe Maria Capece Zurlo, (17 February 1738 – 31 December 1801)
- Carlo Oppizzoni, (28 May 1804 – 8 July 1839)
- Filippo de Angelis, (11 July 1839 – 20 September 1867)
- Victor-Auguste-Isidor Deschamps, CSSR, (31 March 1875 – 29 September 1883)
- Francesco Battaglini, (30 July 1885 – 8 July 1892)
- Giuseppe Melchiorre Sarto, (15 June 1893 – 29 August 1903)
- Emidio Taliani, (12 November 1903 – 24 August 1907)
- Pietro Gasparri, (19 December 1907 – 22 January 1915; 22 January 1915 – 9 November 1915)
- Giovanni Cagliero, SDB, (9 December 1915 – 16 December 1920)
- Achille Locatelli, (25 May 1923 – 5 April 1935)
- Alfred-Henri-Marie Baudrillart, (19 December 1935 – 19 May 1942)
- Clemens August von Galen, (22 February 1946 – 23 March 1946)
- Georges-François-Xavier-Marie Grente, (15 January 1953 – 5 May 1959)
- Aloisius Joseph Muench, (17 December 1959 – 15 February 1962)
- Raúl Silva Henríquez, SDB, (22 March 1962 – 9 April 1999)
- Varkey Vithayathil, (21 February 2001- 1 April 2011)
- George Alencherry, (18 February 2012–present)

== Sources ==
- Le chiese barocche di Roma, Federico Gizzi, Newton Compton, Rome, 1994
