= Giovanni Bona =

Catholic cardinal (1609–1674)

His Eminence Giovanni Bona
- Cardinal-Priest of San Bernardo alle Terme
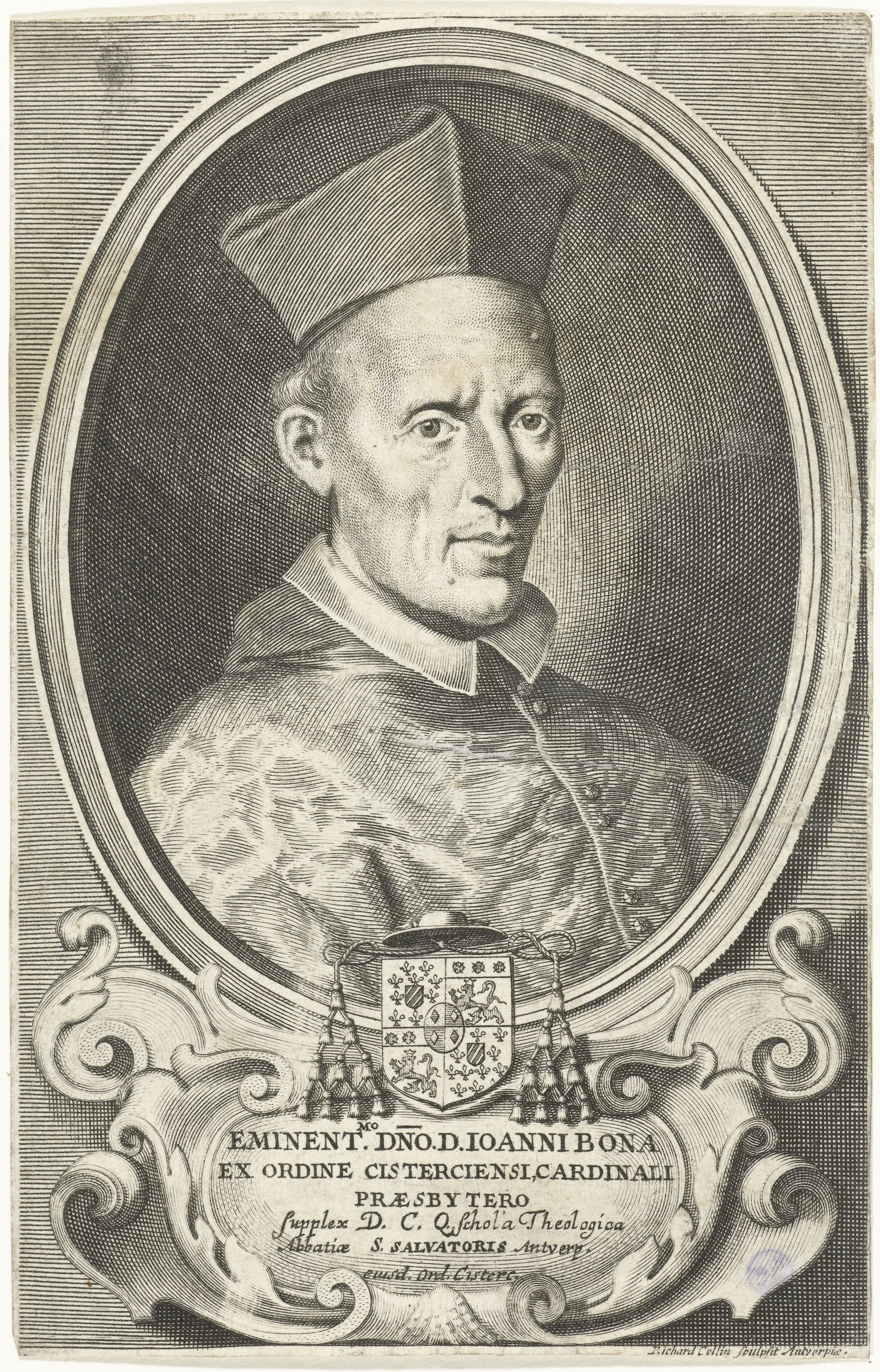
- Church: Catholic Church
- Appointed: 19 May 1670
- Term ended: 28 October 1674
- Successor: Galeazzo Marescotti

Orders
- Created cardinal: 29 November 1669 by Pope Clement IX
- Rank: Cardinal-Priest

Personal details
- Born: 10-19 October 1609 Mondovì, Piedmont
- Died: 28 October 1674 (aged 64–65) Rome, Papal States
- Coat of arms

Giovanni Bona (1609–1674) was an Italian Cistercian, cardinal, liturgist and devotional author.

== Biography ==
Bona was born of an old French family at Mondovì, in Piedmont, northern Italy, on 19 October (according to some, 10 October) 1609. His father favoured a military career for him but, after passing some years at a nearby Jesuit college, he entered the Cistercian monastery of the Congregation of the Feuillants at Pinerolo in 1624. There, as also later at Rome, he pursued his studies with exceptional success.

He worked for fifteen years in Turin, then as prior in Asti and as abbot in Mondovi, and, in 1651, was called to preside over the whole congregation as superior general. During his seven years of official life in Rome he modestly declined all further honours, refusing the Bishopric of Asti.

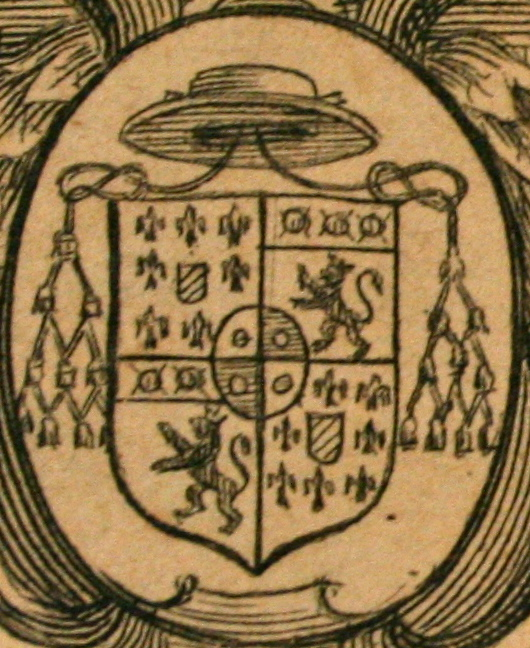
Bona's coat of arms

He welcomed the expiration of his third term, in the scholar's hope that he would be allowed to enjoy a life of retirement and study, but his intimate friend, Pope Alexander VII, wishing to honour his culture and piety, made him Consultor to the Congregation of the Index and to the Holy Office. In 1669, Clement IX made him a cardinal. There was no change in his extremely simple manner of life, and every year he donated his surplus revenue to the needy priests of the Missionary College at Rome. He died at Rome on 28 October 1674, aged 65.

== Writings ==
His best known ascetical works include "Via Compendii ad Deum" (1657), translated into English in 1876 by Henry Collins O. Cist. under the title "An Easy Way to God", "Principia et documenta vitae Christianae" (1673), and "Horologium Asceticum" (Paris, 1676).

His "Manuductio ad cælum" (1658) is often compared to Thomas a Kempis's "The Imitation of Christ" on account of simplicity of the style in which the solid doctrine is taught. Besides passing through fourteen Latin editions in four decades, it has been translated into Italian, French, German, Armenian and Spanish. Sir Roger L'Estrange produced an English translation ("The Guide to Heaven", 1680), later reprinted as "A Guide to Eternity" (London 1900).

Shortly after his ordination he collected some of the most beautiful passages in the Church Fathers on the Mass, and later published them in a booklet, which with certain additions grew into his "De Sacrificio Missae".

In addition he composed several unpublished works, known as "Ascetici", for the instruction of members of his own order.

But his fame does not rest solely on the devotional writings. He was a deep student of antiquity, and so successful in treating of the use of the Psalter in the Christian Church ("De Divinâ Psalmodiâ", Paris, 1663) that Cardinal Pallavicini urged him to undertake the history of the Mass. Realizing the magnitude of the task, at first he declined, but finally set to work and after more than seven years labour brought out his famous work: "De Rebus Liturgicis" (Rome, 1671), a veritable encyclopedia of historic information on all subjects bearing on the Mass, such as rites, churches, vestments and so on. The first of many editions of his complete works was published at Antwerp in 1677.

== Sources ==
- Herbermann, Charles, ed. (1913). "Giovanni Bona" . Catholic Encyclopedia. New York: Robert Appleton Company.
- Pius Maurer: Kardinal Giovanni Bona. Cistercienser, geistlicher Schriftsteller und Pionier der Liturgiewissenschaft, in: Analecta Cisterciensia 59 (2009) 3-166
