= Bourdons-sur-Rognon =

- Commune
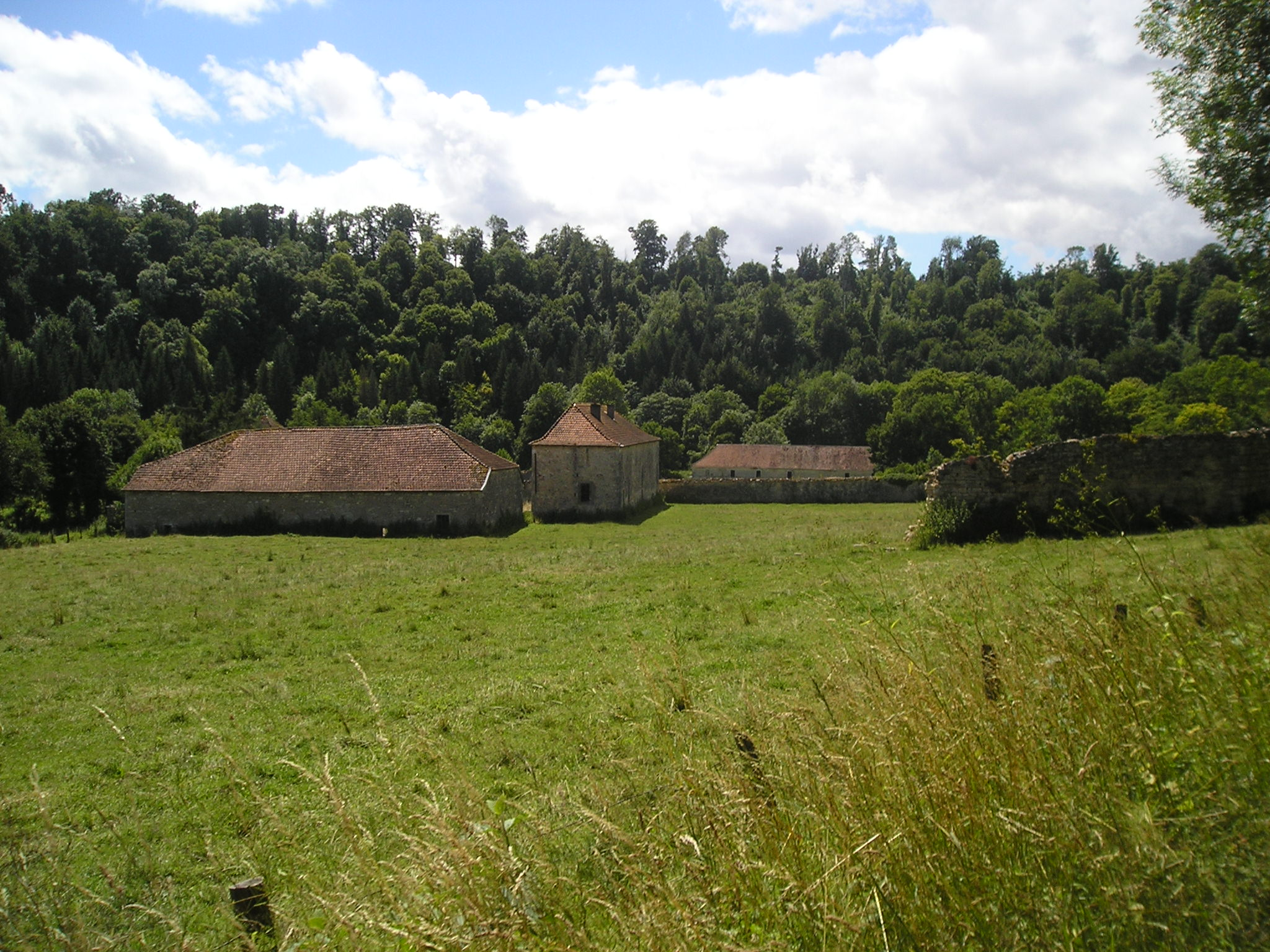
- The Crête abbey in Bourdons-sur-Rognon

- Coat of arms
- Location of Bourdons-sur-Rognon
- Location within France Location within Grand Est
- Coordinates: 48°10′03″N 5°21′03″E
- Country: France
- Region: Grand Est
- Department: Haute-Marne
- Arrondissement: Chaumont
- Canton: Bologne

Government
  - Mayor (2020–2026): Gilles Berthet
- Area^{1}: 39.45 km^{2} (15.23 sq mi)
- Elevation: 338 m (1,109 ft)
- Highest elevation: 360 m (1,180 ft)
- Lowest elevation: 310 m (1,020 ft)
- Population (2023): 293
  - Density: 7.43/km^{2} (19.2/sq mi)
- Time zone: UTC+01:00 (CET)
  - Summer (DST): UTC+02:00 (CEST)
- INSEE/Postal code: 52061 /52700
- ^{1} French Land Register data, which excludes lakes, ponds, glaciers > 1 km^{2} (0.386 sq mi or 247 acres) and river estuaries.

Bourdons-sur-Rognon (French pronunciation: [buʁdɔ̃ syʁ ʁɔɲɔ̃]) is a commune in the Haute-Marne department in northeastern France.

The former La Crête Abbey was located here.

== Population ==
Historical population
Year	Pop.	±% p.a.
1968	413	—
1975	365	−1.75%
1982	338	−1.09%
1990	306	−1.24%
1999	294	−0.44%
2007	295	+0.04%
2012	260	−2.49%
2017	285	+1.85%
2023	293	+0.46%
Source: INSEE

== See also ==
- Communes of the Haute-Marne department
