= Salle du Manège =

Seat of deliberations during most of the French Revolution

Coordinates: 48°51′55.16″N 2°19′38.16″E

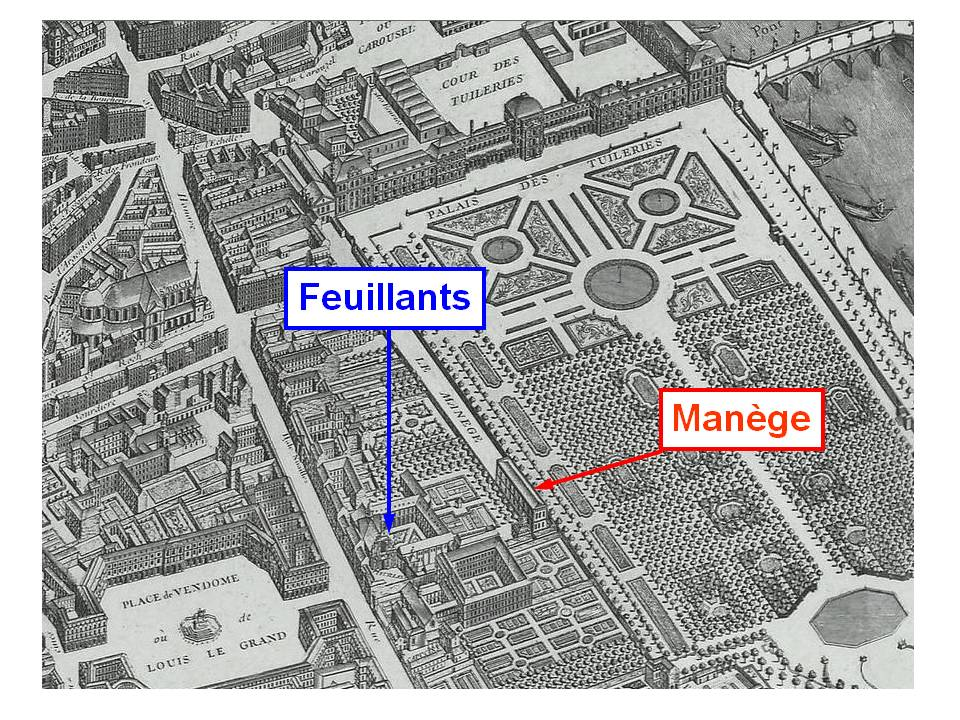
The Salle du Manège on the plan de Turgot

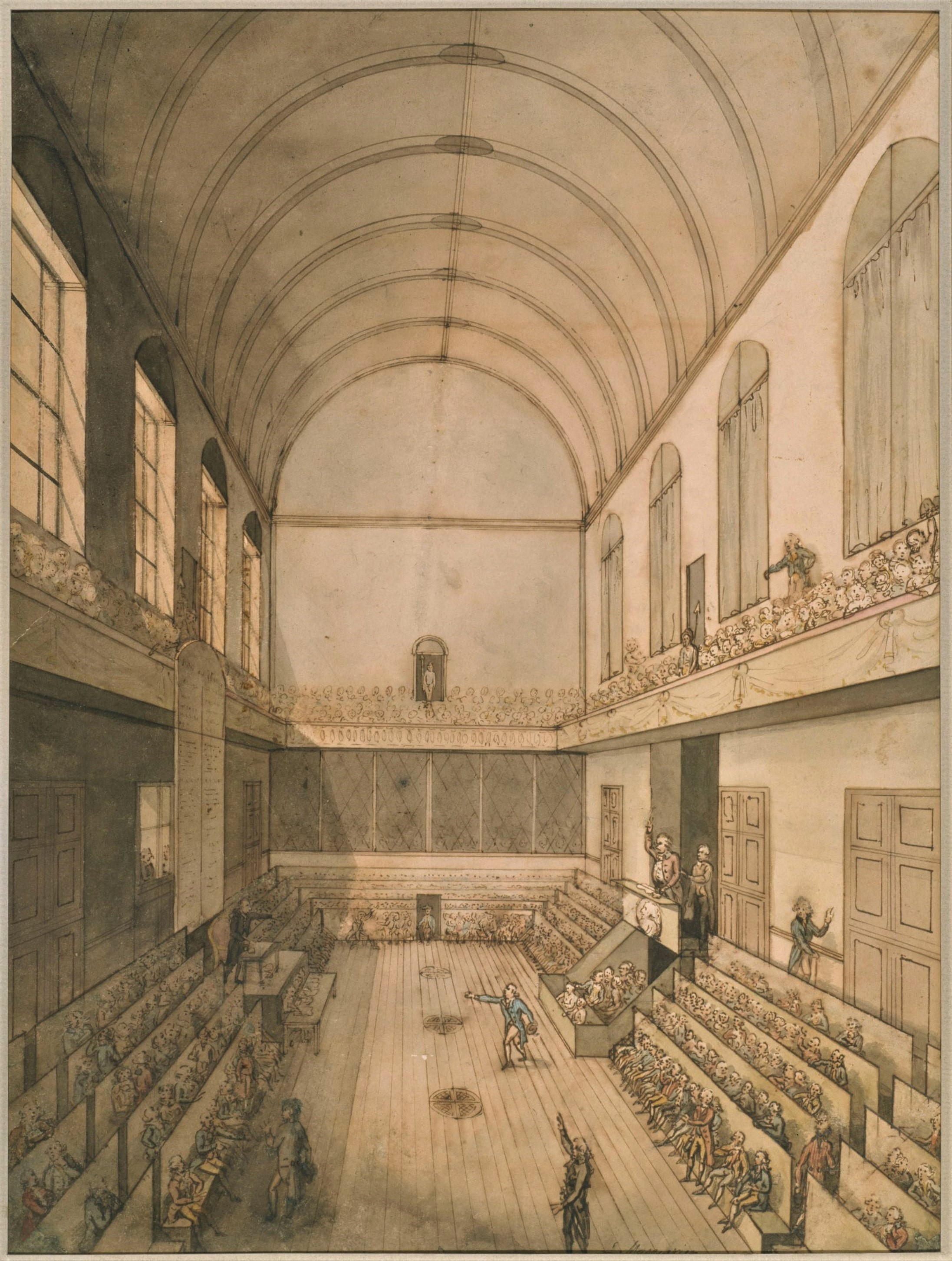
The Salle du Manège during the French Revolution

The indoor riding academy called the Salle du Manège (French: [sal dy manɛʒ]) was the seat of the various national legislatures during most of the French Revolution, from 1789 to 1798. It was demolished in 1804 to make way for the rue de Rivoli.

== History ==
=== Before the Revolution ===
Before the revolution, the Salle du Manège ("Riding Hall"), situated along the north end of the Tuileries Gardens to the west of the Tuileries Palace in Paris, was home to the royal equestrian academy. Built during the minority of Louis XV, when it lay conveniently close to the Regent's Palais Royal, it was allowed to pass afterwards from hand to hand as the site of privately conducted riding schools, though it was never formally sold.

=== French Revolution ===
On 9 November 1789 the National Assembly, formerly the Estates-General of 1789, moved its deliberations from Versailles to the Tuileries in pursuit of Louis XVI and installed itself in the Salle du Manège on the palace grounds. Having nationalised the goods of the Church, the Assemblée nationale, requiring more space than the Manège alone could provide, extended its occupation to two adjacent convents, those of the Capuchins, which soon housed the Revolutionary printing presses in its former refectory, and of the Feuillants, whose handsome library received the archives of the Assemblée.

The proportions of the Salle du Manège, ten times as long as it was wide, offered poor acoustics for the debates that went on continually under its high vaults. Six tiers of banquettes permitted space for the deputies, ranged on either side of the central tribune, initially planned for the orators' podium. Seated together for solidarity, the deputies seated themselves according to their political opinions, to right and to left of the president's desk. During the National Assembly, the right benches were occupied by conservatives like the Monarchiens and the left ones by Jacobins and other radicals; this pattern continued into the period of the Legislative Assembly, though with the conservatives being largely replaced with moderate liberals like the members of the Feuillant Club. After the National Convention was called in 1792, The Mountain quickly occupied the left benches, while Girondins, after some hesitation, occupied the ones on the right vacated by the now-defunct Feuillants. The Plain sat in the lowest rank of banquettes, from which they were wont to cross to the opposite side, as their opinions dictated. The public found places to witness the spectacle at either end of the hall and in the loge seats above.

In 1795 under the French Directory, the Council of 500 sat in the structure until the body moved to the Palais-Bourbon in 1798. In 1799, the Jacobin Club du Manège had its headquarters there.
