= La Crête Abbey =

Abbey in Haute-Marne, France

Coordinates: 48°12′57″N 5°19′6″E

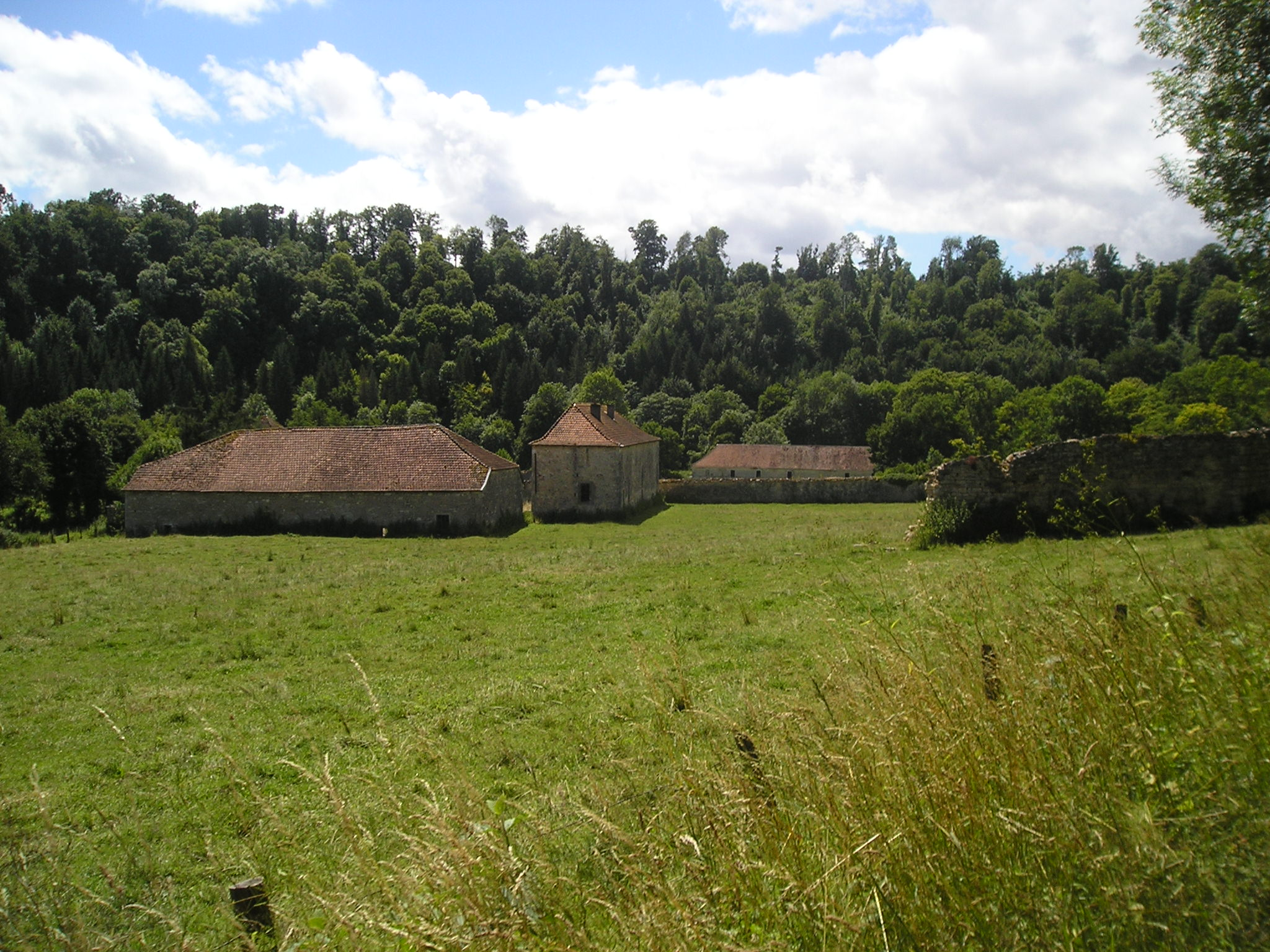
Abbey remains

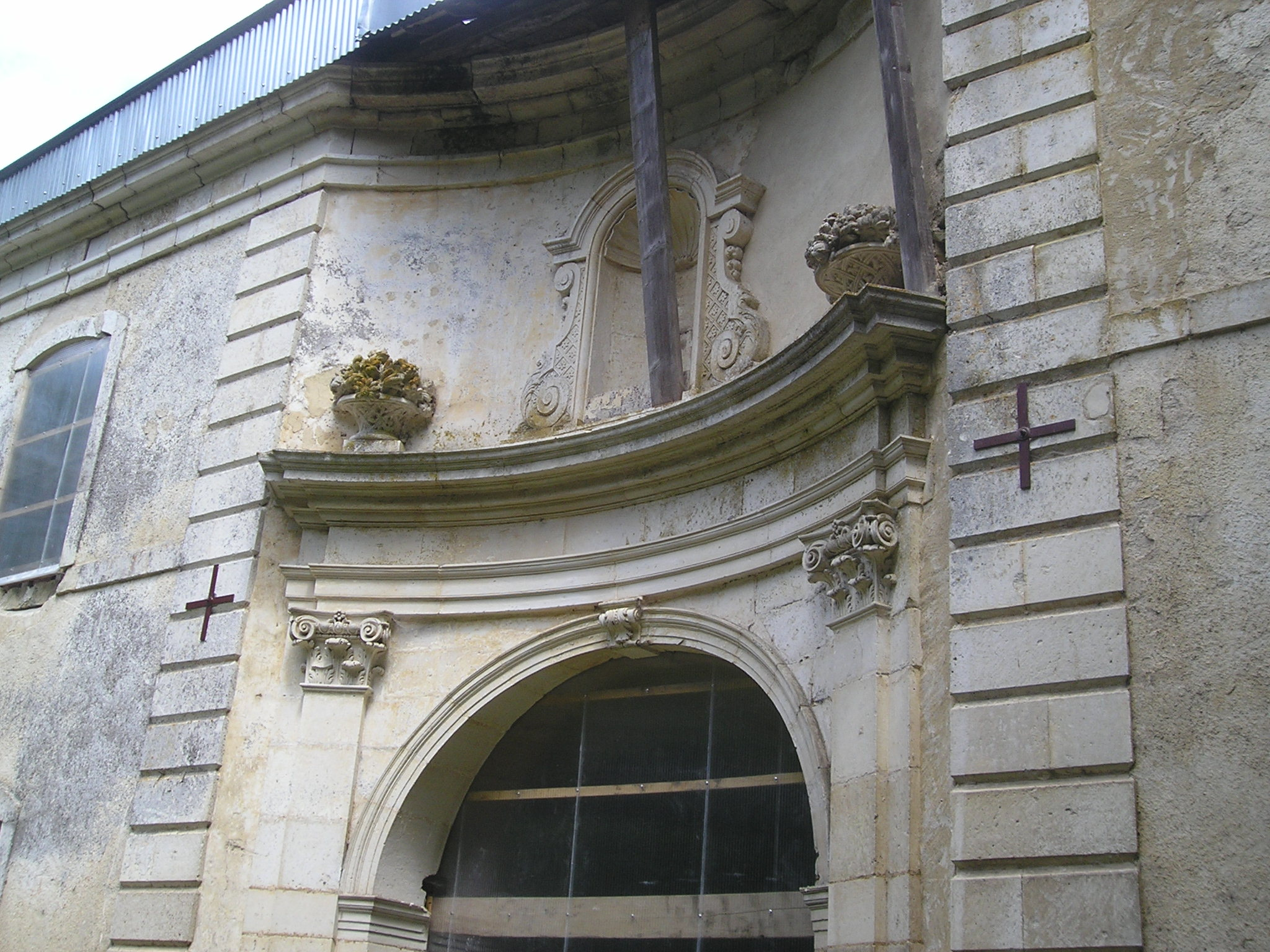
Gate house

La Crête Abbey (French: Abbaye de La Crête, anciently La Chreste; Latin: Crista alba) was a Cistercian monastery in the commune of Bourdons-sur-Rognon in the département of Haute-Marne, France.

It was founded in 1121 as the second daughter house of Morimond Abbey by Simon de Clefmont, after a failed attempt at a foundation in 1118 at the site now known as La Vieille-Crête. The abbey was very active in founding further monasteries: Les Vaux-en-Ornois in Saint-Joire (1130), Saint-Benoît-en-Woëvre (1132), Les Feuillants (1145) and Matallana in Villalba de los Alcores (1173).

It was suppressed during 1791 in the French Revolution, when the church and conventual buildings were mostly demolished.

Little remains of the mediaeval structures, known from a plan of 1705, apart from the chapter house. The gate house of 1715 also survives.

== Sources ==
- Bernard Peugniez, 2001: Routier cistercien. Abbayes et sites. France, Belgique, Luxembourg, Suisse (p. 137; new expanded edition). Éditions Gaud: Moisenay ISBN 2840800446
- Isabelle Lambert, Jean-Marie Mouillet, Jacques Charlier, 2006: L'abbaye de La Crête, 1121–1789. Des pierres aux prières. Éditions Dominique Guéniot: Langres ISBN 2878253620
