= Les Feuillants Abbey =

Abbey in Haute-Garonne, France

Coordinates: 43°21′14″N 1°08′23″E

Les Feuillants Abbey, also Feuillant Abbey (French: Abbaye des Feuillants, Abbaye des Feuillans or de Feuillant, also Abbaye Notre-Dame-des-Feuillants, des Feuillans or de Feuillant; Latin: Fulium), was a Cistercian monastery located in the present commune of Labastide-Clermont, about 8 kilometres south of Rieumes, department of Haute-Garonne, France. From the 16th century it was the centre of the Cistercian reform movement to which it gave its name, the Feuillants.

== History ==
The abbey was founded in 1145 on land given by Count Bernhard IV of Comminges as a dependency of Dalon Abbey. In 1169 (or possibly 1163) the new foundation joined the Cistercian movement as a daughter house of La Crête Abbey of the filiation of Morimond. Later it became a daughter house of Loc-Dieu Abbey.

From 1577 the ascetic reforms introduced by the commendatory abbot Jean de la Barrière were practised here, and were so widely taken up in other monasteries that in 1589 the abbey became the head of the Feuillants as an independent order, which separated from the Cistercian Order.

It was dissolved, along with the order of which it was the mother house, in 1791, during the French Revolution.

== Buildings ==
There are very few visible remains of the structures of the abbey.

== Sources ==
- Héliodore Castillon, Histoire des populations Pyrénéennes du Nébouzan et du pays de Comminges: depuis les temps les plus anciens jusqu'à la révolution de 89, Toulouse, Delsol, 1885, 497 p. (online version)
