= Bernard de Montgaillard =

The Reverend Lord Bernard de Montgaillard OCist
- Abbot of Orval Abbey
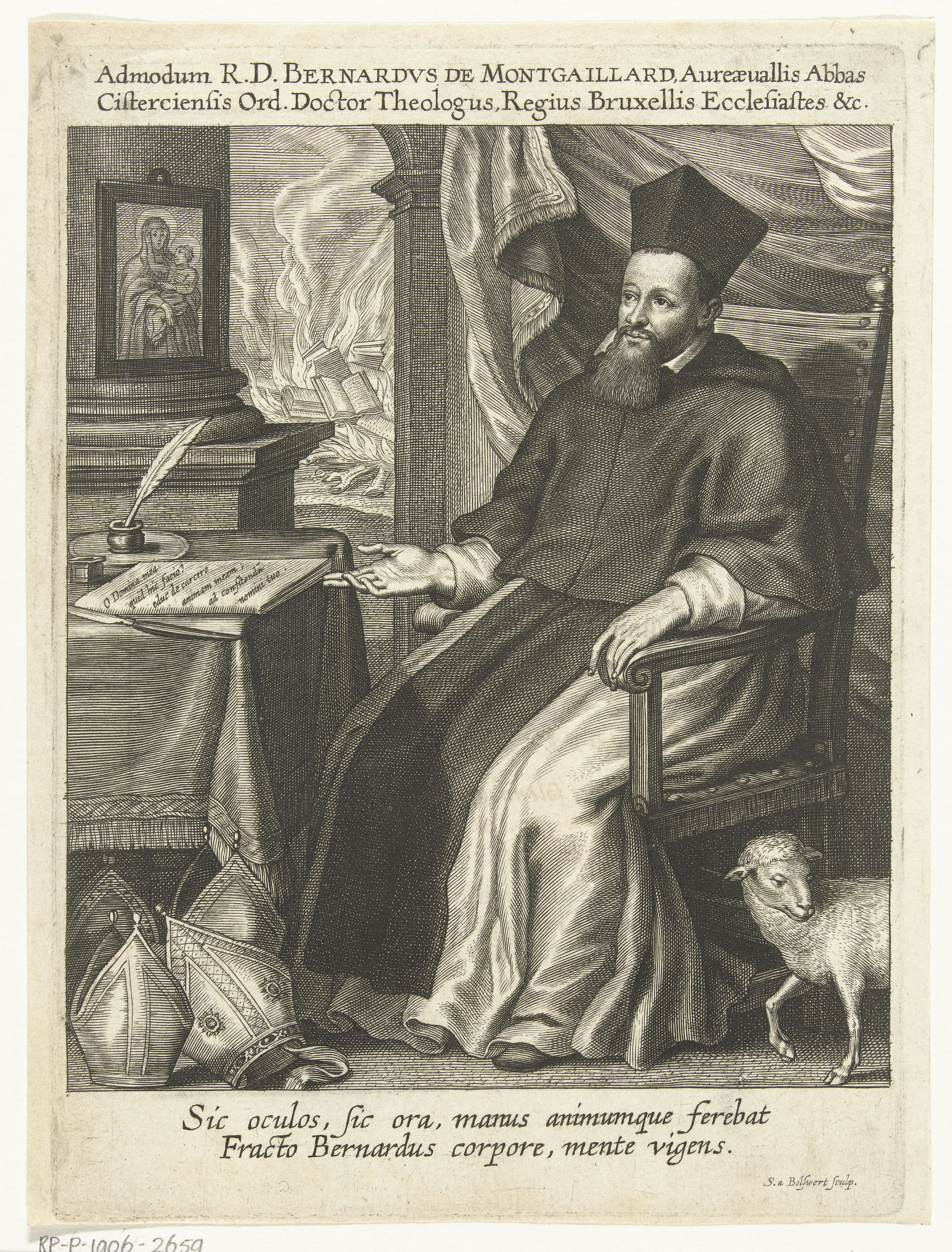
- Engraved portrait by Schelte a Bolswert
- Church: Catholic
- Installed: 1605
- Term ended: 1628

Personal details
- Born: Bernard de Percin de Montgaillard; 1563
- Died: 8 June 1628 (aged 64–65)

Bernard de Montgaillard (1563–1628) was a French Cistercian preacher and abbot of Orval Abbey.

== Life ==
Bernard was born in 1563, the son of Bertrand de Percin, lord of Montgaillard, and Antoinette Du Vallet. In 1579, aged 16, he joined the Congregation of the Feuillants, whose rule prescribed a single meal per day, in the evening, with no meat, fish eggs or butter. His eloquence as a preacher brought him to royal notice, so that he was invited to preach the Lenten sermons at Saint-Germain l'Auxerrois in Paris. At the death of Henry III of France in 1589, he became a prominent figure in the Catholic League opposing the accession of Henri IV, taking part in the procession of armed clergy in Paris on 13 May 1590. He left Paris in 1593 and travelled to Rome, before going into exile in the Spanish Netherlands. There he was affiliated to the Cistercians and preached for six years in Antwerp before being appointed preacher to the court chapel of the Archdukes Albert and Isabella. In January 1601, Justus Lipsius wrote to him praising his eloquence.

In 1605 he became abbot of Orval, in the Duchy of Luxemburg. In 1622 he preached a funeral oration for the Archduke Albert, which was the only one of his sermons to be published. At the approach of his own death, Bernard burned all his manuscript sermons. He died at Orval on 8 June 1628 and was buried in the abbey.

== Works ==
- Responce du Pere Dom Bernard, doyen des Religieux Feuillentins lez Paris, à une lettre que luy a escripte Henry de Valois ([Paris, Jean Pillehotte], 1589)
- Le soleil eclipsé ou Discours sur la vie et mort du serenissime archiduc Albert (Brussels, Hubert Anthoine, 1622)
