= Val Abbey =

Abbey in Val-d'Oise, France

Coordinates: 49.0786°N 2.2264°E

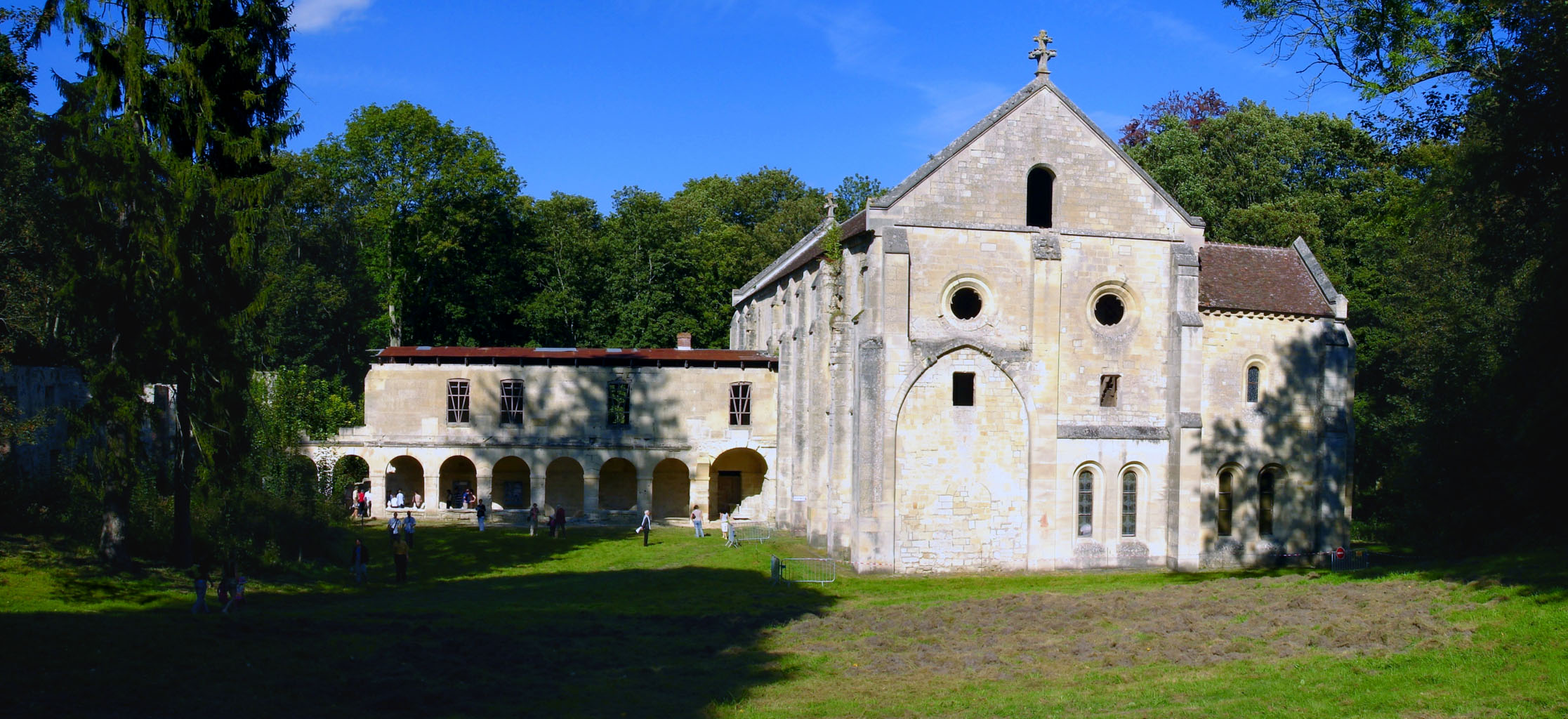
The surviving buildings

Val Abbey (Abbey of St Mary of Val) (Abbaye Notre-Dame du Val) was a Cistercian abbey in Mériel and Villiers-Adam in Val-d’Oise, 30 kilometres (19 mi) north of Paris. It was the oldest Cistercian foundation in Île-de-France, dating to 1125, more than a century before the neighbouring Royaumont Abbey and Maubuisson Abbey. It was demolished and used for building stone in 1822 and 1845, leaving it mostly in ruins, though some of its buildings survive, including its dormitories and one gallery of its cloister. The monks' building was classed as a historical monument in 1947, as were the other buildings in 1965.
