= Labastide-Clermont =

- Commune
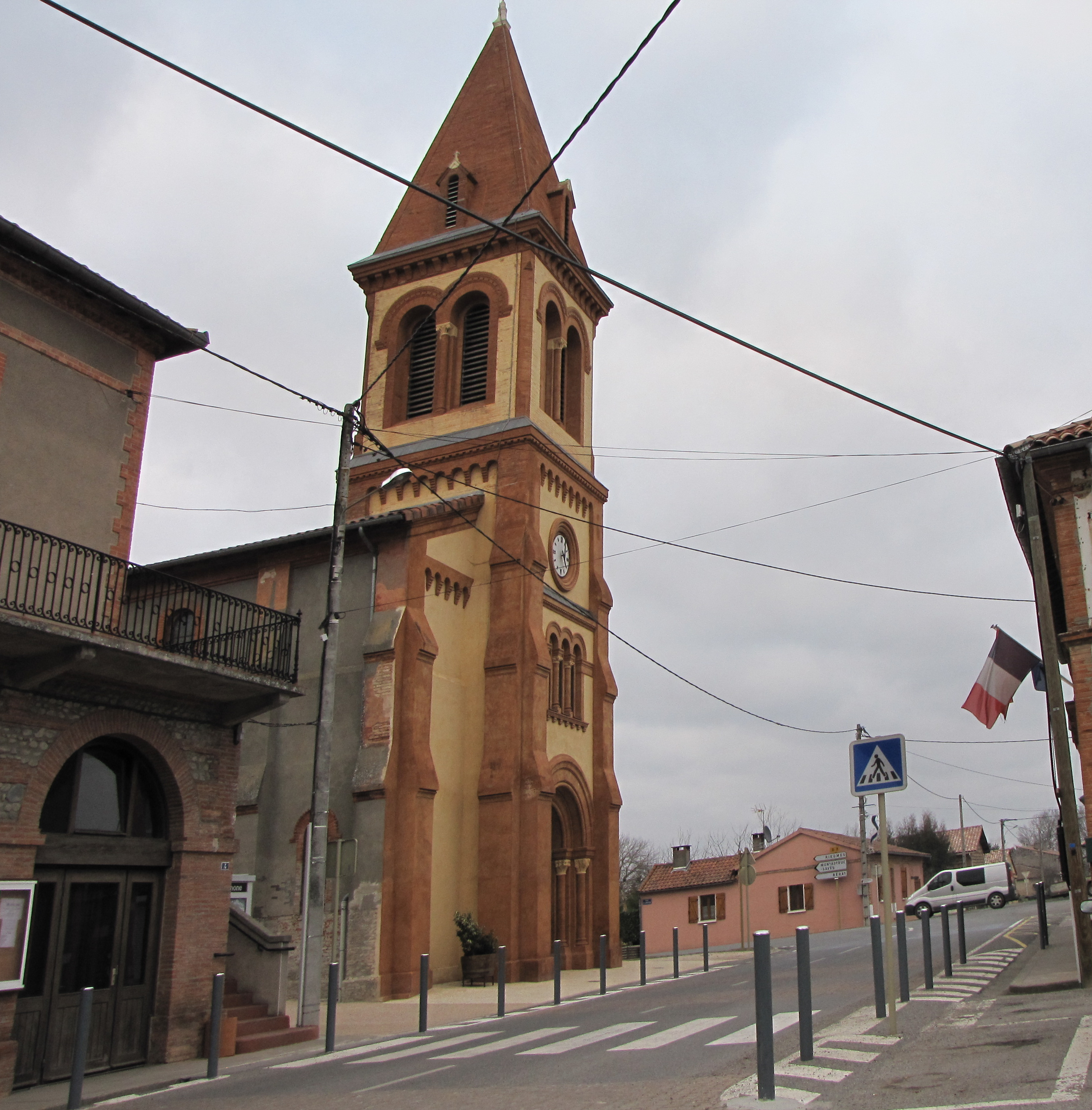
- The church in Labastide-Clermont
- Location of Labastide-Clermont
- Location within France Location within Occitanie
- Coordinates: 43°20′58″N 1°07′19″E
- Country: France
- Region: Occitania
- Department: Haute-Garonne
- Arrondissement: Muret
- Canton: Cazères

Government
  - Mayor (2020–2026): Pierre-Alain Dintilhac
- Area^{1}: 14.58 km^{2} (5.63 sq mi)
- Elevation: 294 m (965 ft)
- Highest elevation: 349 m (1,145 ft)
- Lowest elevation: 222 m (728 ft)
- Population (2023): 690
  - Density: 47/km^{2} (120/sq mi)
- Time zone: UTC+01:00 (CET)
  - Summer (DST): UTC+02:00 (CEST)
- INSEE/Postal code: 31250 /31370
- ^{1} French Land Register data, which excludes lakes, ponds, glaciers > 1 km^{2} (0.386 sq mi or 247 acres) and river estuaries.

Labastide-Clermont (French pronunciation: [labastid klɛʁmɔ̃]; Occitan: La Bastida de Clarmont) is a commune in the Haute-Garonne department in southwestern France.

== Population ==
Historical population
Year	Pop.	±% p.a.
1968	291	—
1975	275	−0.80%
1982	325	+2.42%
1990	347	+0.82%
1999	416	+2.04%
2007	624	+5.20%
2012	695	+2.18%
2017	664	−0.91%
2023	690	+0.64%
Source: INSEE

== See also ==
Communes of the Haute-Garonne department
