= Jean Baseilhac =

Surgeon

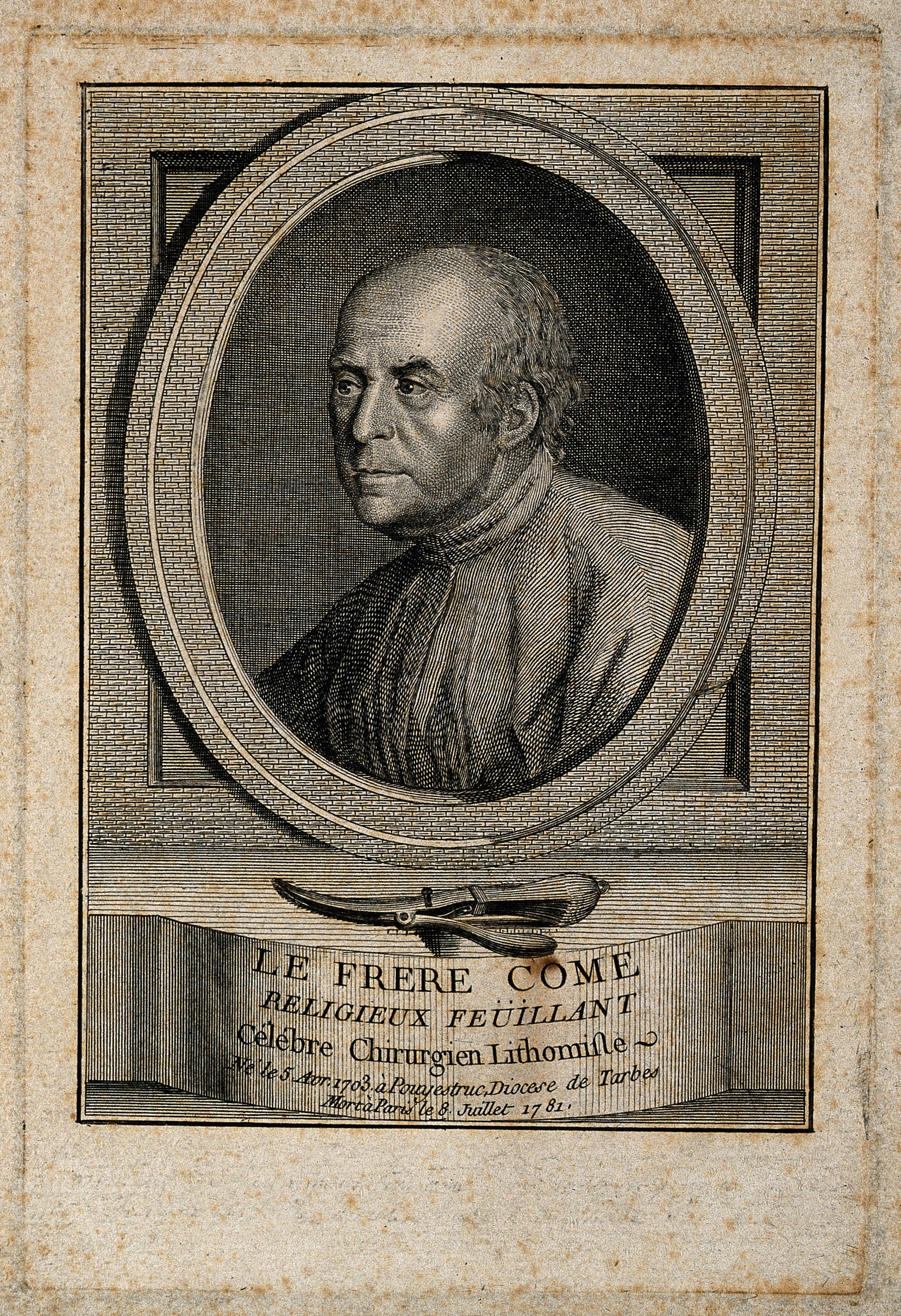
- Born: 1703; Pouyastruc, Tarbes, France
- Died: July 8, 1781 (aged 77–78)
- Occupations: Physician and surgeon

Jean Baseilhac known as Brother Côme (or Cosme) (1703 – July 8, 1781) was a French surgeon and lithotomist.

== Biography ==
Born near Tarbes, he came from a family of surgeons. In 1726, he went to practice in Paris and was attached to the Hôtel-Dieu. He already enjoyed a great reputation when he took the habit with the Feuillants in 1729. It was there that he received the name of Brother Jean de Saint-Côme, Saint Côme being the patron saint of surgeons. He founded at his own expense in Paris a hospice for the poor where he practiced in person. In 1767, through her solicitations from the Comptroller General Bertin, Jean Baseilhac, convinced of the usefulness of the courses she gave, obtained a patent for the famous midwife Angélique du Coudray.

On July 1, 1750, Baseilhac performed his first cataract extraction, and may have been the trigger that caused two other cataract surgeons (Natale Pallucci and Jacques Daviel) to begin performing with experimenting with cataract extraction in the first week of July 1750, thus initiating a revolution in ophthalmology, for which cataract couching had been the predominant technique since antiquity.

He is the ancestor of the president of the Commercial Court of Tarbes Jean Baseuilhac.

== Works ==
Jean Baseilhac is the inventor, among other instruments, of the lithotome, the operation of which limited the drawbacks and dangers of previous methods - in particular that of Jacques de Beaulieu (1651-1714). A controversy opposed him to the famous surgeon Claude-Nicolas Le Cat about his practice of the hidden lithotome (Parallel of the lateral size with that of the hidden lithotome, published by Le Cat in 1766 in Amsterdam under the pseudonym A.-P. Nahuys).

== Publications ==
- Method of extracting the stone from the urinary bladder over the pubis (…), Paris, d'Houry, 1779. With intaglio figures

== Notoriety ==
The figure of Brother Cosme appears several times in Diderot, notably in Jacques le fataliste where the Master attributes to him a successful size operation and in his letter to Sophie Volland du December 1, 1765.
