= Saint-Nicolas-des-Champs, Paris =

Roman Catholic church in Paris

Coordinates: 48.8653°N 2.35389°E

Saint-Nicolas-des-Champs
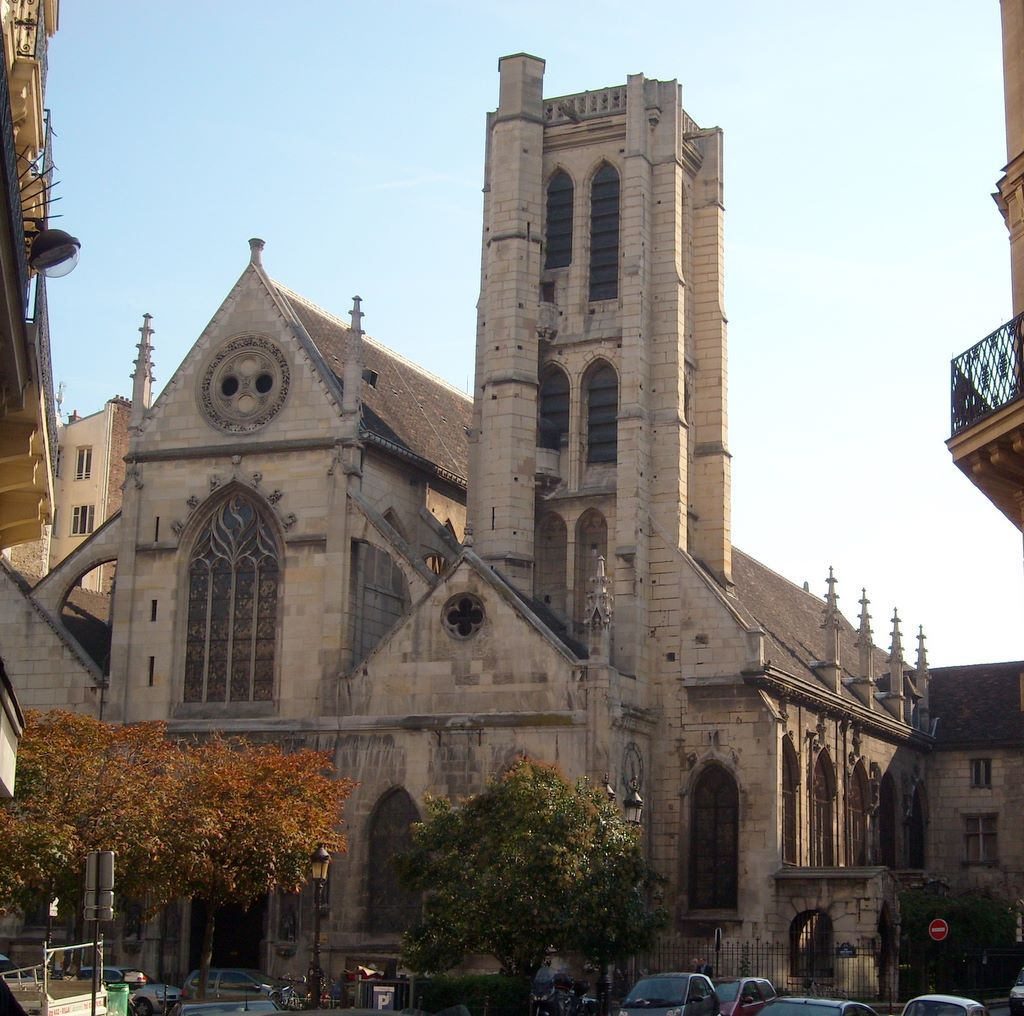
- Saint-Nicolas-des-Champs west front

Religion
- Affiliation: Catholic Church
- Province: Archdiocese of Paris
- Region: Île-de-France
- Rite: Roman Rite
- Status: Active

Location
- Location: 254 Rue Saint-Martin, 3rd arrondissement of Paris
- State: France
- Interactive map of Saint-Nicolas-des-Champs

Architecture
- Type: Church
- Style: French Gothic, French Renaissance
- Groundbreaking: end of the 12th century
- Completed: 1615

Website
- asaintnicolas.com

The Church of Saint-Nicolas-des-Champs (French: Église Saint-Nicolas-des-Champs; literally, St Nicholas-in-the-Fields) is a Catholic church in Paris' Third arrondissement. Early parts of the church, including the west front, built 1420–1480, are in the Flamboyant Gothic style, while later portions, including the south portal, mostly built 1576–86, are examples of French Renaissance architecture. It is notable particularly for its Renaissance carved sculpture, decoration and large collection of French Renaissance paintings in the interior.

== History ==
The first chapel was constructed at the end of the 11th century by the monks of the Priory of Saint-Martin-des-Champs, a Benedictine monastery, as a church for the servants of the abbey. The abbey at this time was one of the most important in France; it was called "the third daughter of Cluny", after Cluny Abbey in Burgundy, the monastery responsible for the order's Cluniac reforms. It is located next to the Musée des Arts et Métiers, a museum of industrial arts and crafts, which occupies the site of the original Priory of Saint Martin, and preserves a portion of the old monastery.

At the time when the abbey and chapel were built, they were outside the city walls, but gradually the city surrounded them, and the chapel was also used by the residents of the new neighbourhood that grew up around the priory. The church was rebuilt and enlarged at the end of the 12th century. The early features of the church, including the west front, the lower bell tower, the seven first traverses of the nave, and the first collateral aisle on the south side. These were built between 1420 and 1480 in the Flamboyant late Gothic style.

As the population continued to grow, the church was enlarged again between 1576 and 1586. Additional traverses were added to the nave, as well as double aisles on the lower collateral portions on the north and south, and very decorative portal to the south transept. The tower, originally separate, was surrounded by church structure and raised in height. All these additions were in the French Renaissance style.

Another enlargement took place from 1613 to 1615. This added two additional traverses to the nave, as well as a double disambulatory with radiating chapels. The choir was enlarged and the apse chapel and dome were constructed at the east end.

The church was closed during the French Revolution, and converted briefly into a Temple devoted to "Hymen and Fidelity". Much of the art was destroyed or disappeared. In December 1792, a painter and entrepreneur named Croupart received an order from the Revolutionary government to cover with plaster all the murals in a dozen of the chapels, "in order to remove the symbols of feudalism and superstition". It became a church again in 1802, and was fully restored between 1823 and 1829. It was shut down for three months during the Paris Commune (March–May 1871) and used as a socialist meeting hall.

In 1995, the church became formally associated with Emmanuel Community, an evangelical Catholic movement.

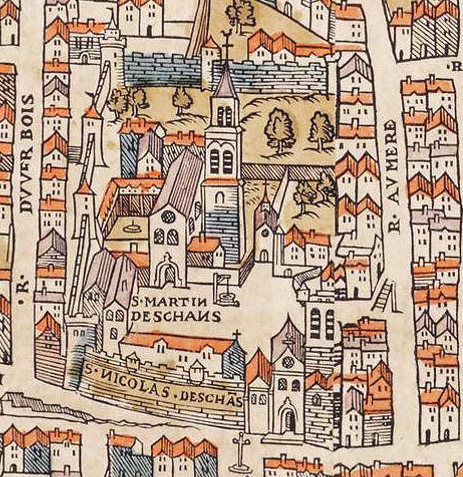
The church in 1550 below the Priory of Saint Martin

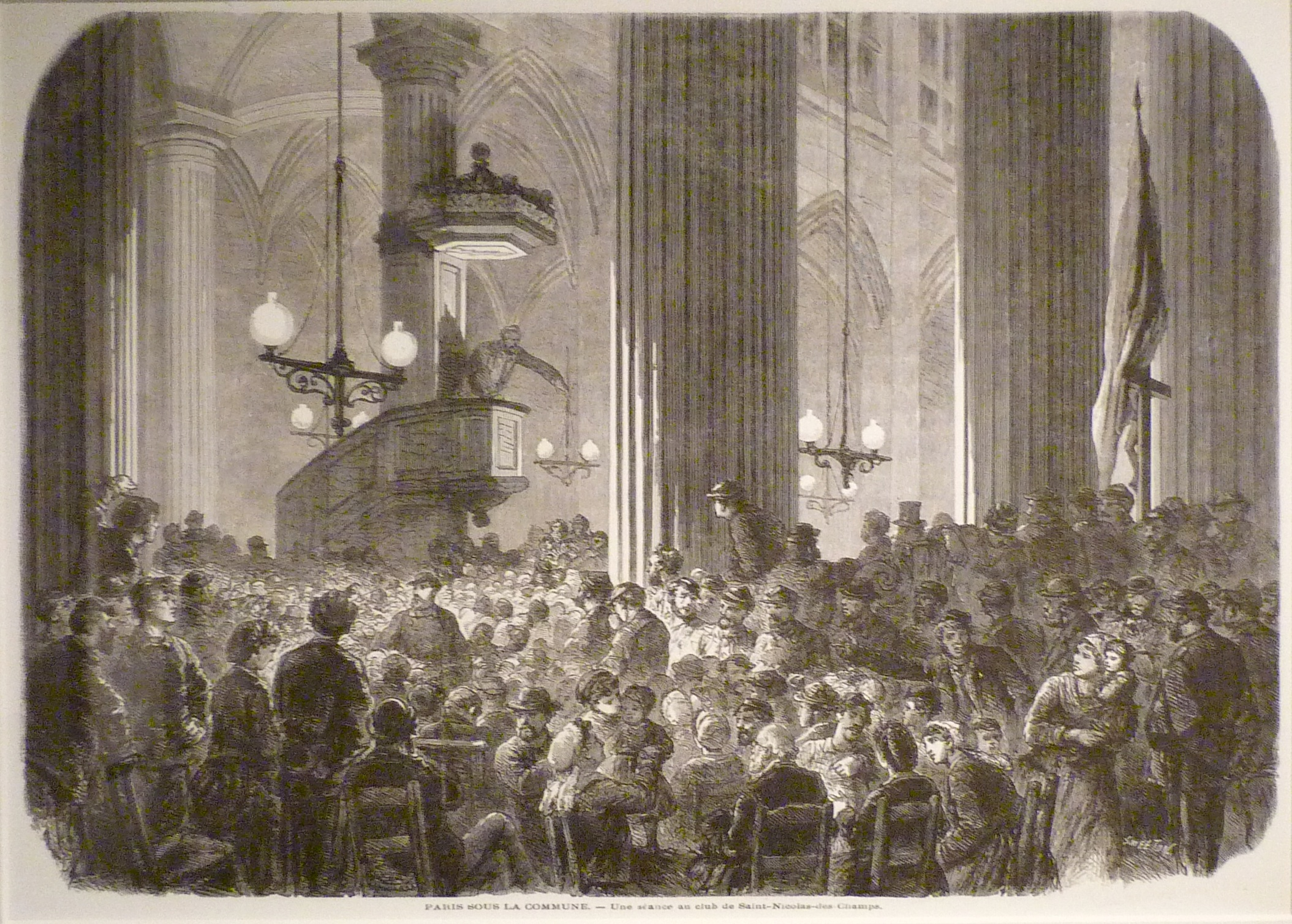
Church transformed into a socialist meeting hall during Paris Commune (April 1871)

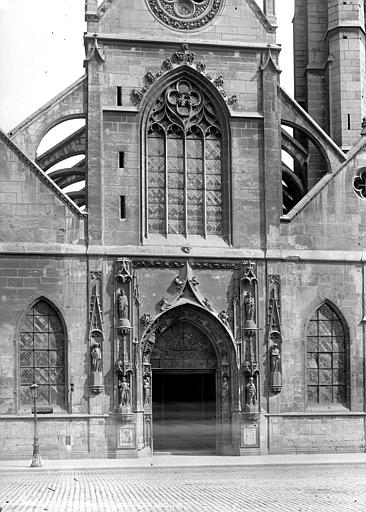
The western facade before 1892

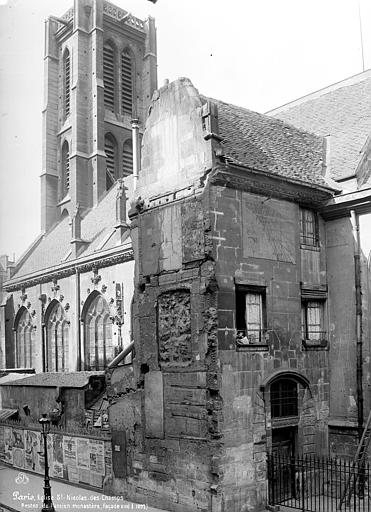
Vestige of the old abbey next to the church (1892 - Médiathèque de l'architecture et du patrimoine)

== Exterior ==
The bell tower is positioned slightly back from the west front. The lower portion dates to the 15th century, while the upper portion was rebuilt in the 17th century.

The west front, or facade dates to the 15th century, and is Flamboyant in style, with three pignons or pointed gables corresponding to the nave and the two lower aisles. The outer pignons have small circular windows, and are connected with the central pignon with flying arches. The central west front has the main portal, framed by a pointed arch and an accolade and two buttresses. Above the portal is large window with three vertical ribs. Above the window is a larger gable, at the top of which is a small rose window with three lobes. All the sculpture on the west front dates from 1843.

While the west front is Flamboyant, the south front features a Renaissance portal constructed at the end of the 16th century, with pilasters and columns representing the classical orders. Its decoration includes sculpted busts of women and angels sounding trumpets to the glory of God. On the west front, the underside of the porch is decorated with particularly elaborate carved oak sculpture from the 17th century. The consoles of the walls on the west front are decorated with sculpted figures of winged female figures sounding trumpets.

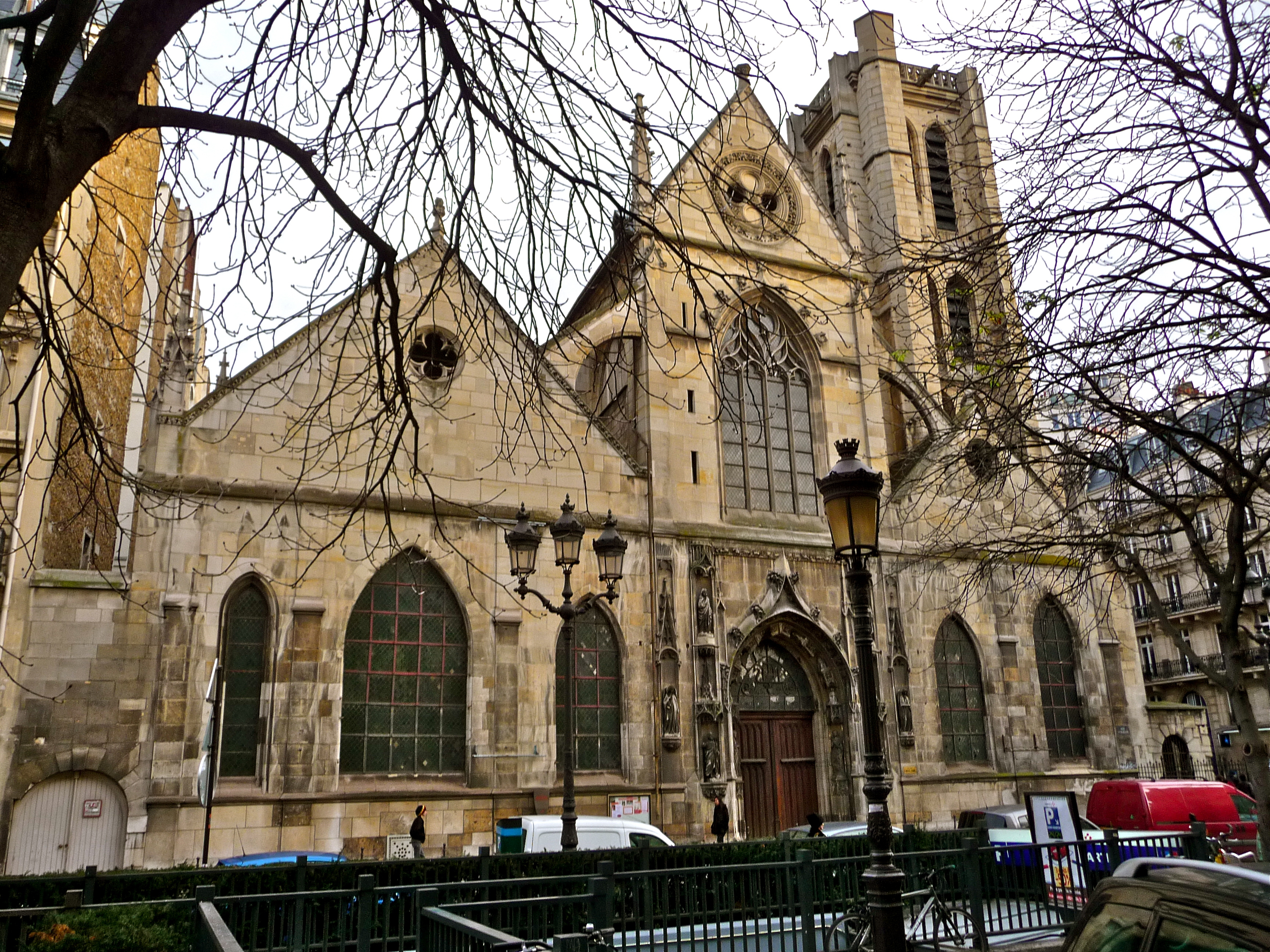
The west front

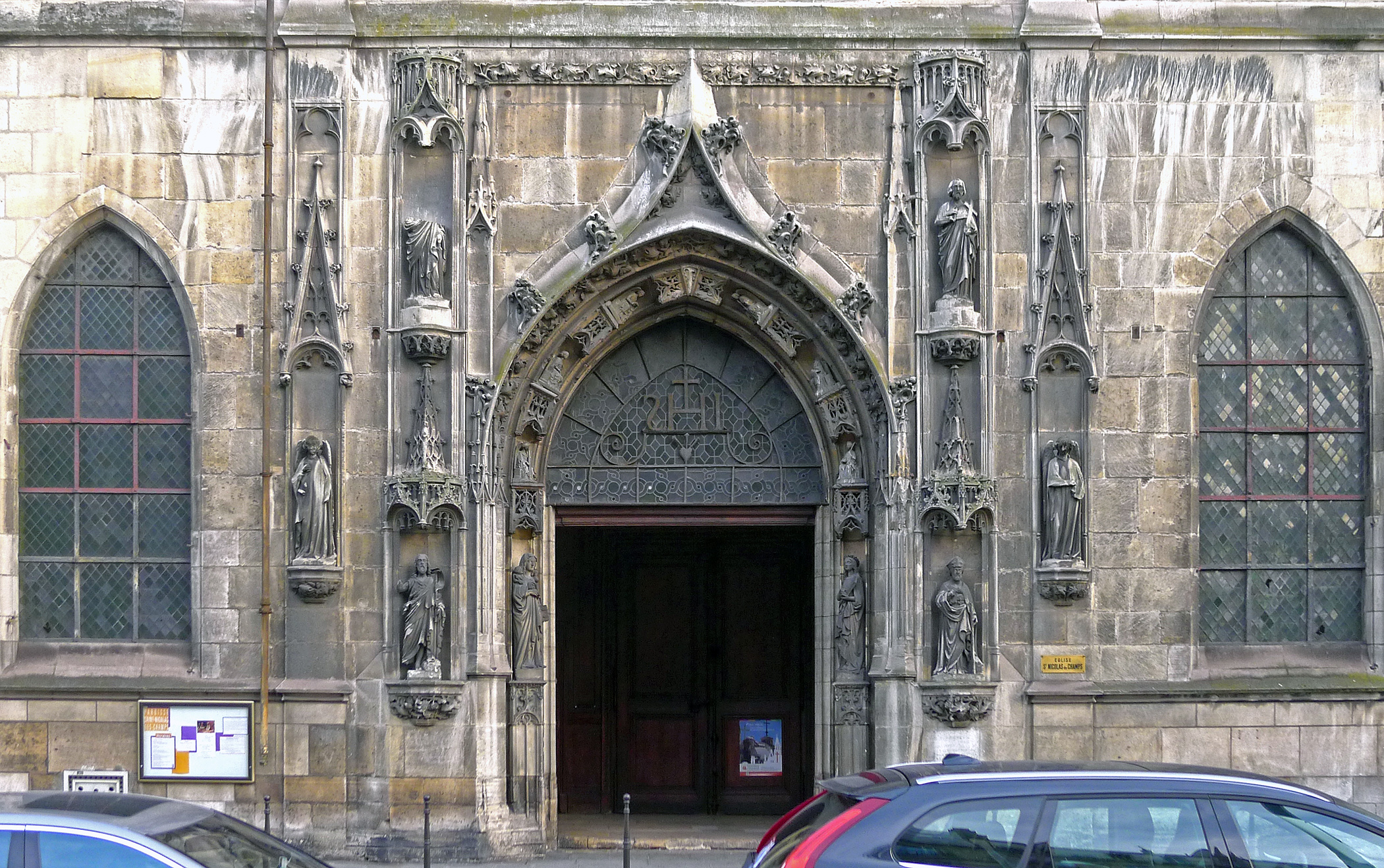
The west portal, in Flamboyant Gothic style (15th c.)

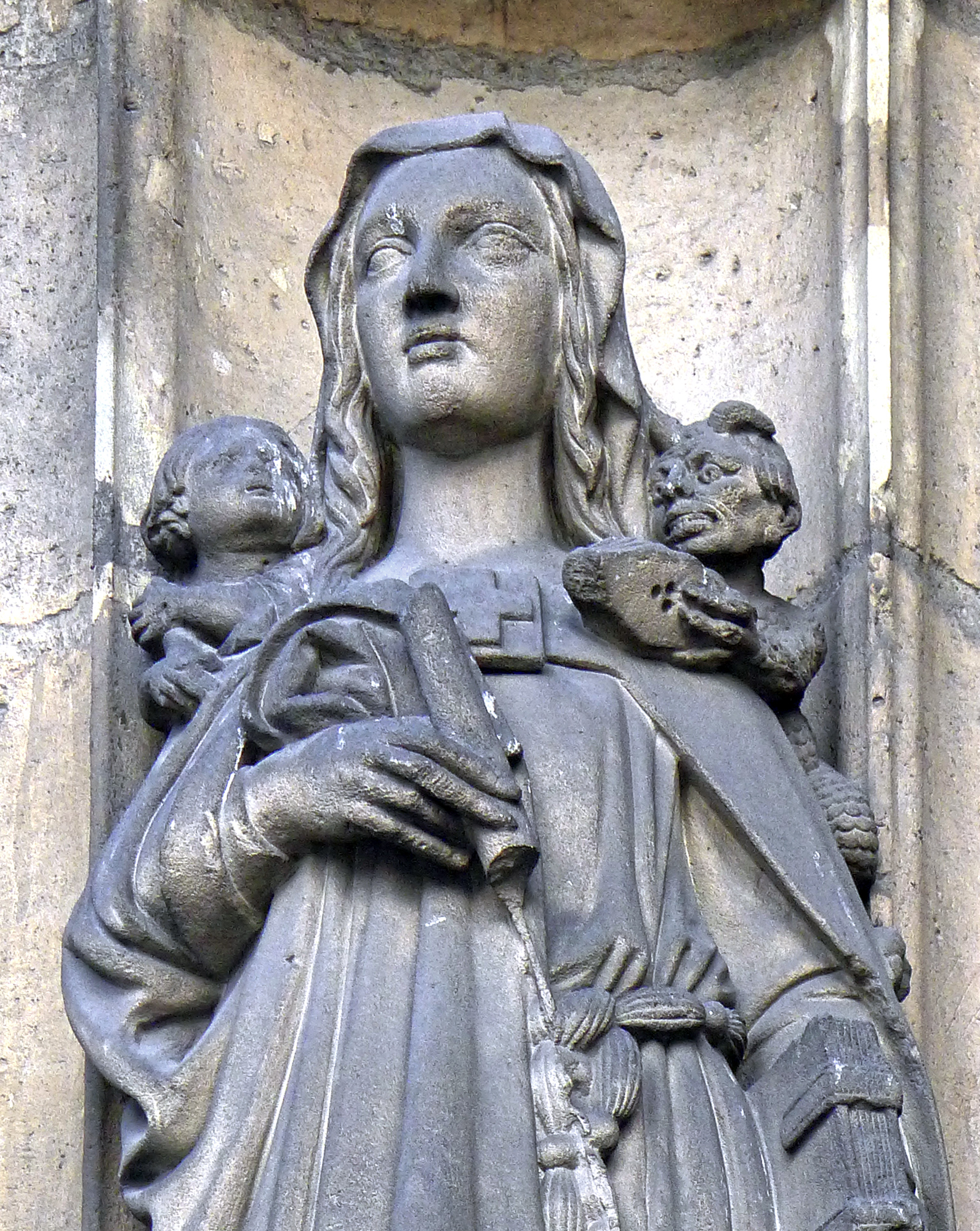
Sculpture of the west portal (19th c.)

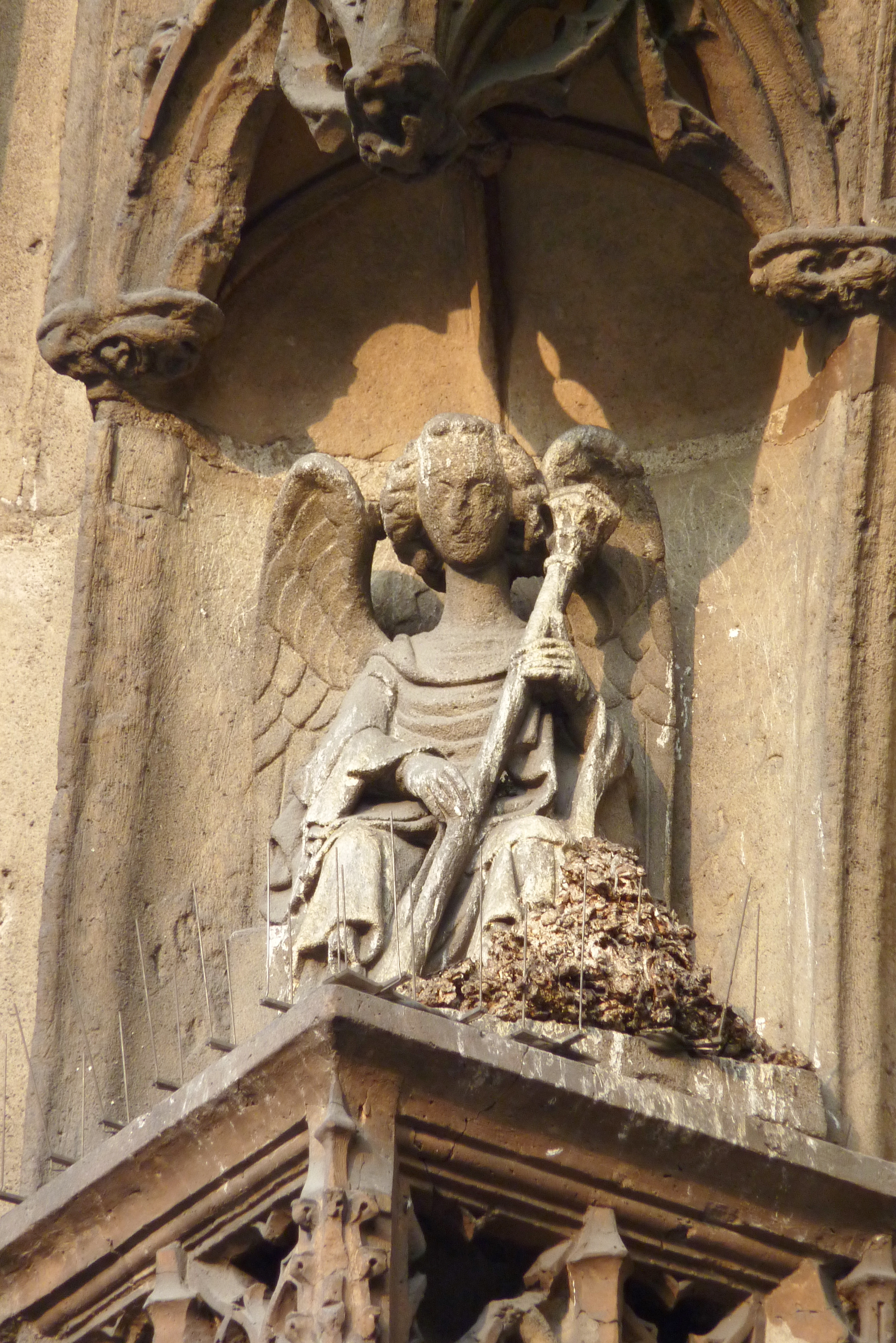
Sculpture of angel with trumpet, south portal

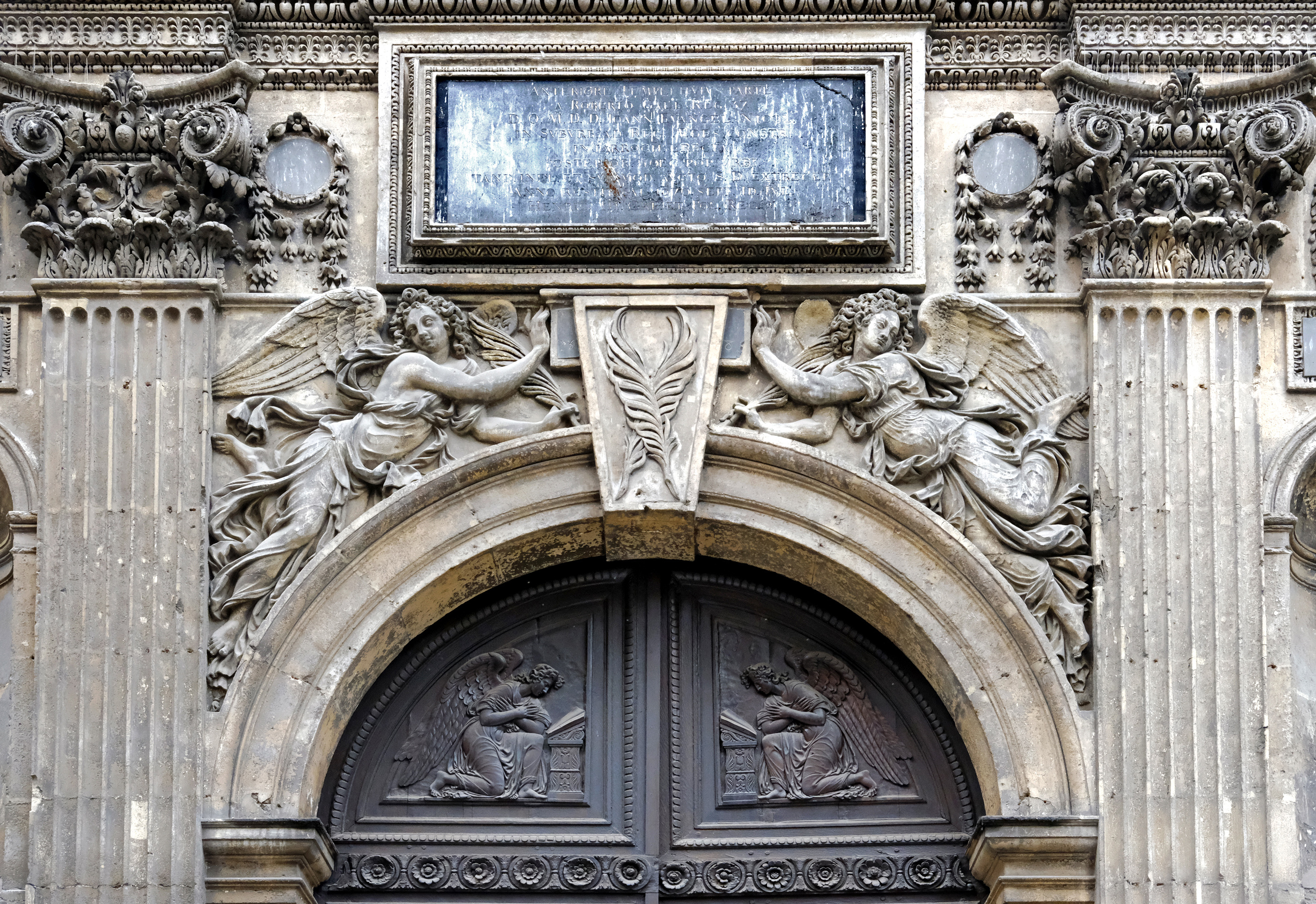
Detail of the south portal, in Renaissance style (17th c.)

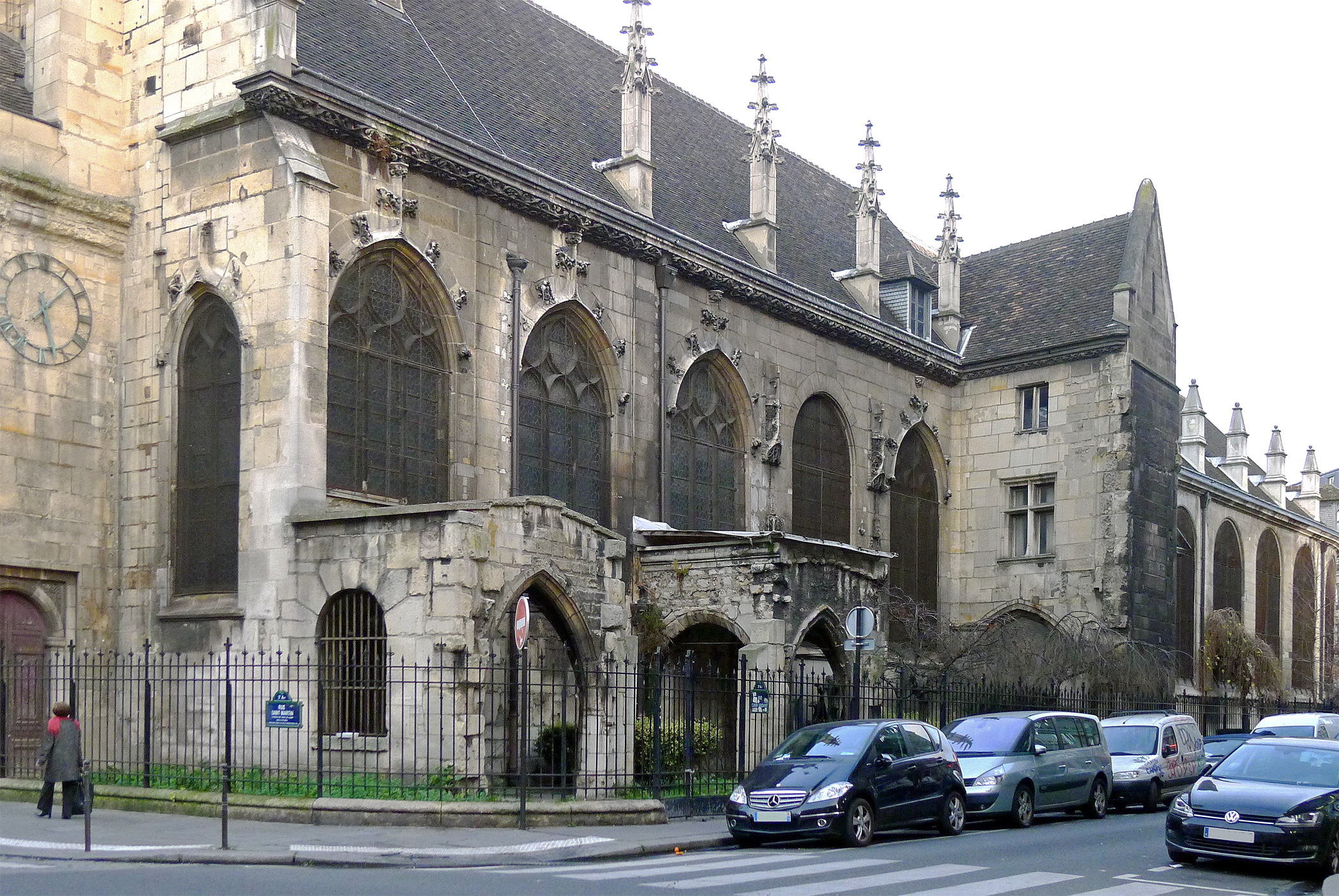
South front and transept, with pinnacles on the concealed arches

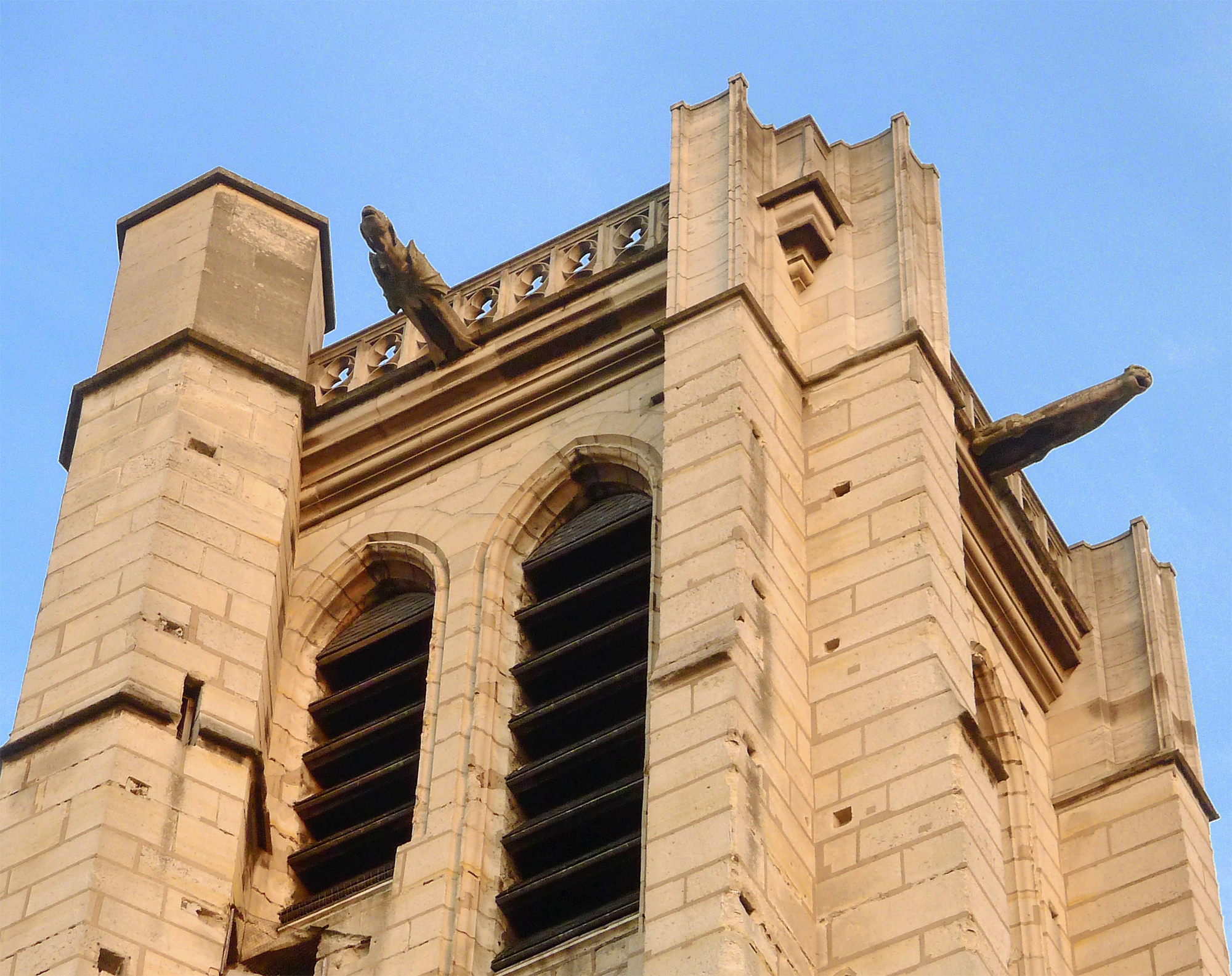
Detail of the tower, with gargoyles to eject rain water

== Interior ==
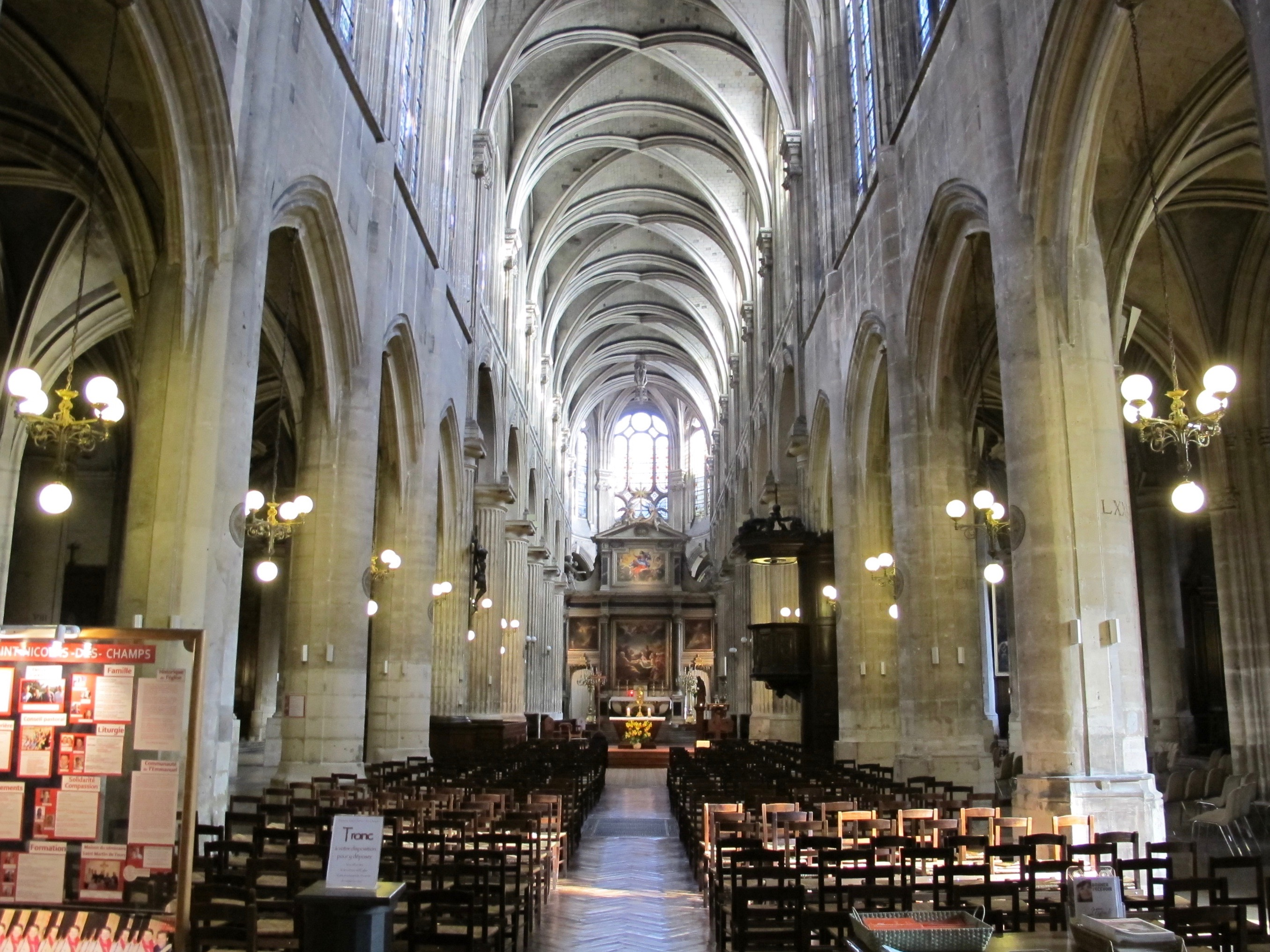
The nave from the west, facing the choir

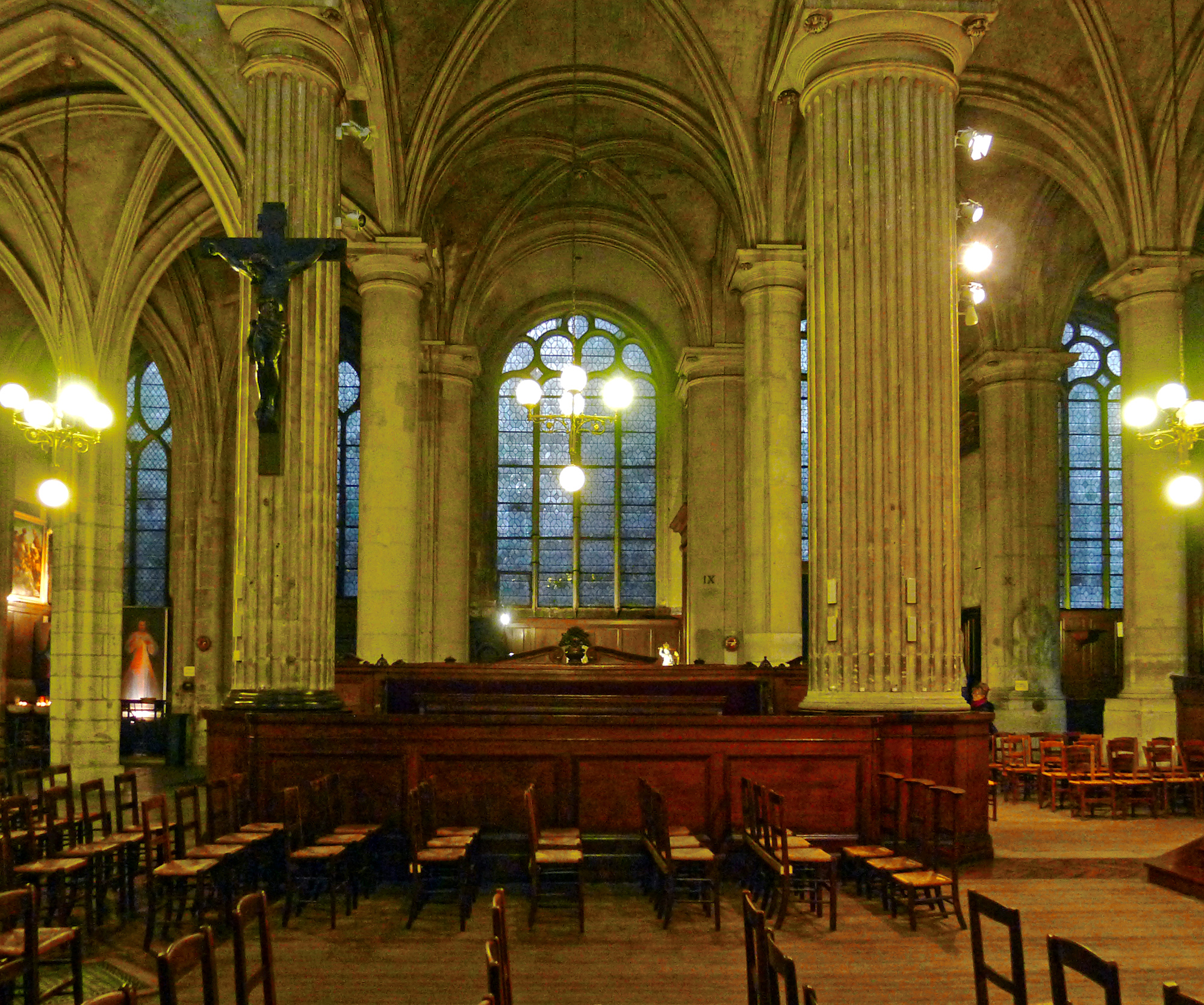
The choir and transept, with classical columns

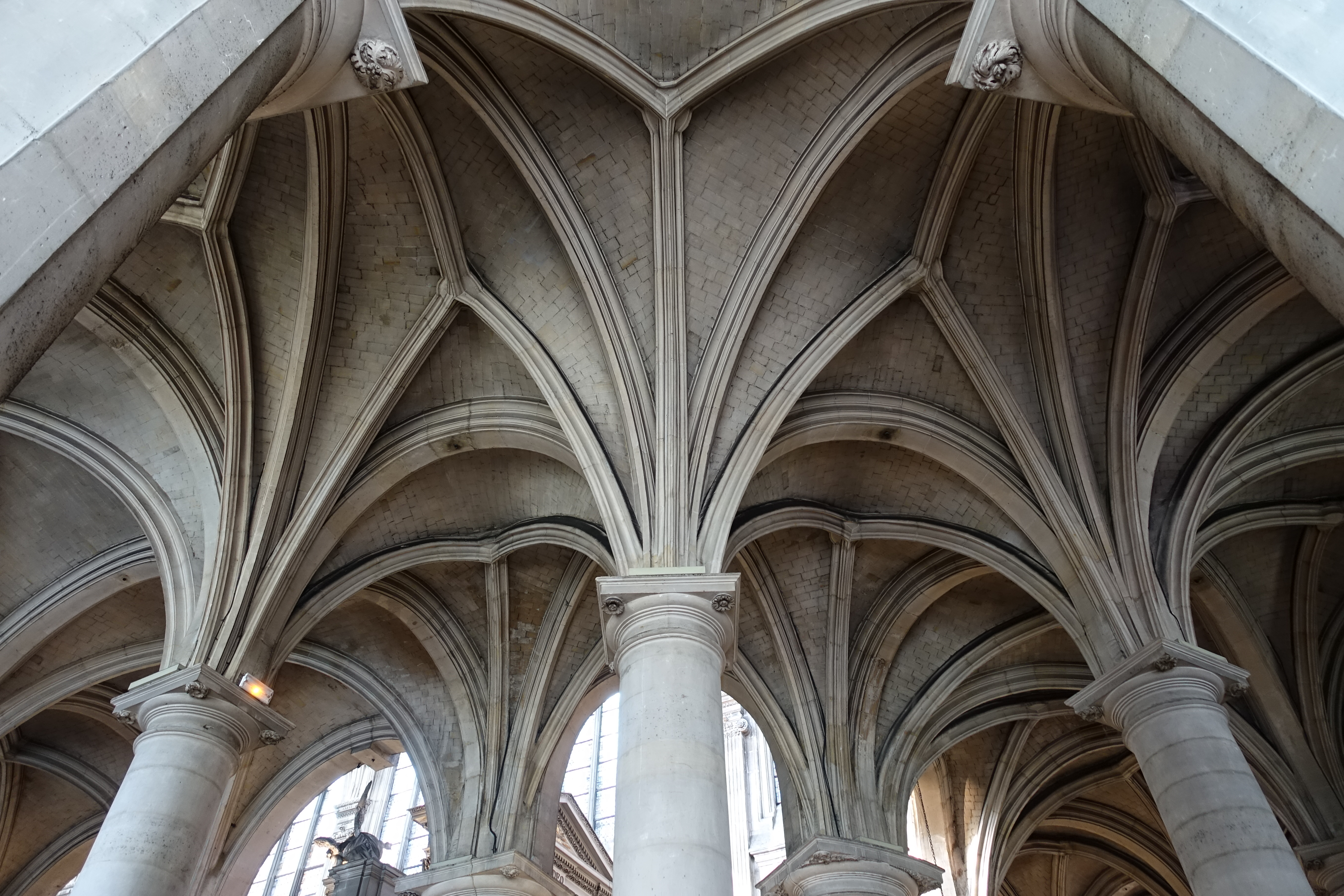
Flamboyant vaults of the choir

The most striking sight of the interior is the forest of one hundred columns. The Flamboyant interior was largely modified in the 17th and 18th century to meet the demands of the more classical style of French Renaissance architecture style. The Gothic pillars that supported the arcades and vaults in the choir were replaced by classical Doric order columns, topped by pilasters in the Ionic style. In addition, most of the stained glass in the upper widows was removed and replaced with white glass, to bring more light into the interior, and to make it easier to read texts.

The oldest part of the interior, from the fifteenth century, contains the seven first traverses of the nave, and the first collateral aisle on the south side. In the 16th century, the next four traverses were added, and a second lower aisle on the south, and two new lower aisles on the north. At the beginning of the 17th century, the final two traverses were added, along with the choir, the double disambulatory, or aisles around the east end behind the choir; and the chapels in the apse.

=== Interior of the west porch (17th c.) ===
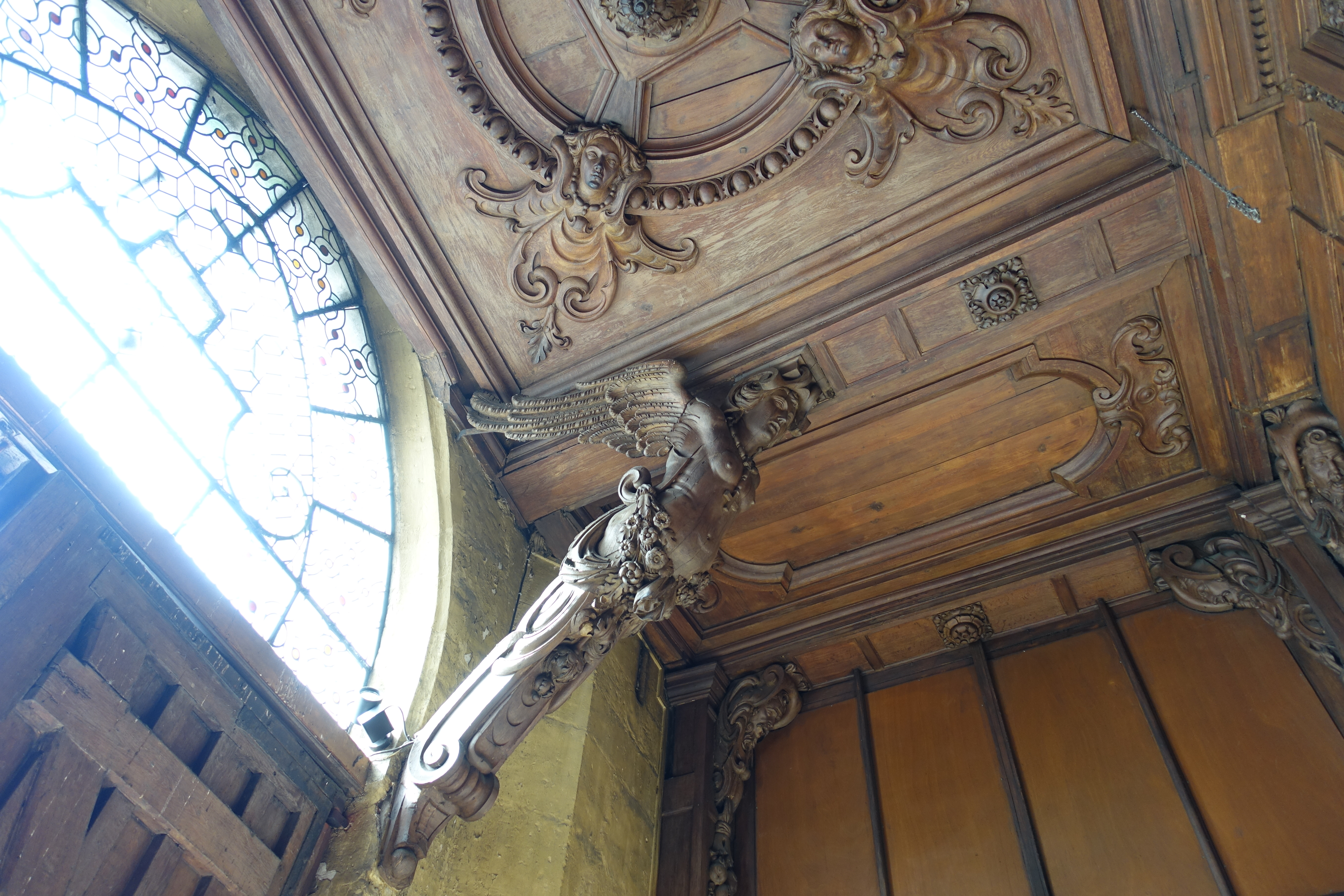
Carved interior decoration of the west porch

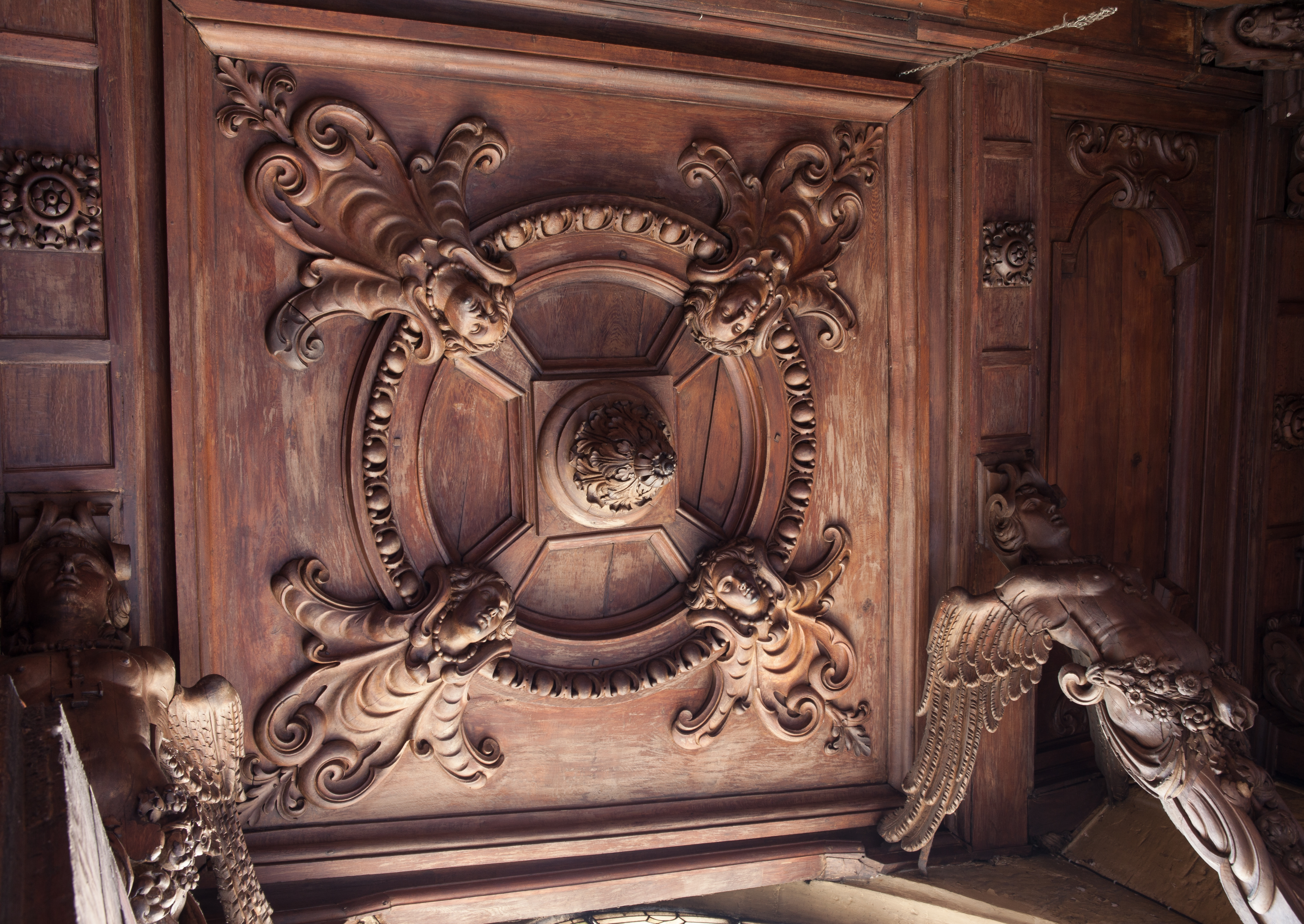
Carved ceiling of the west porch (17th c.)

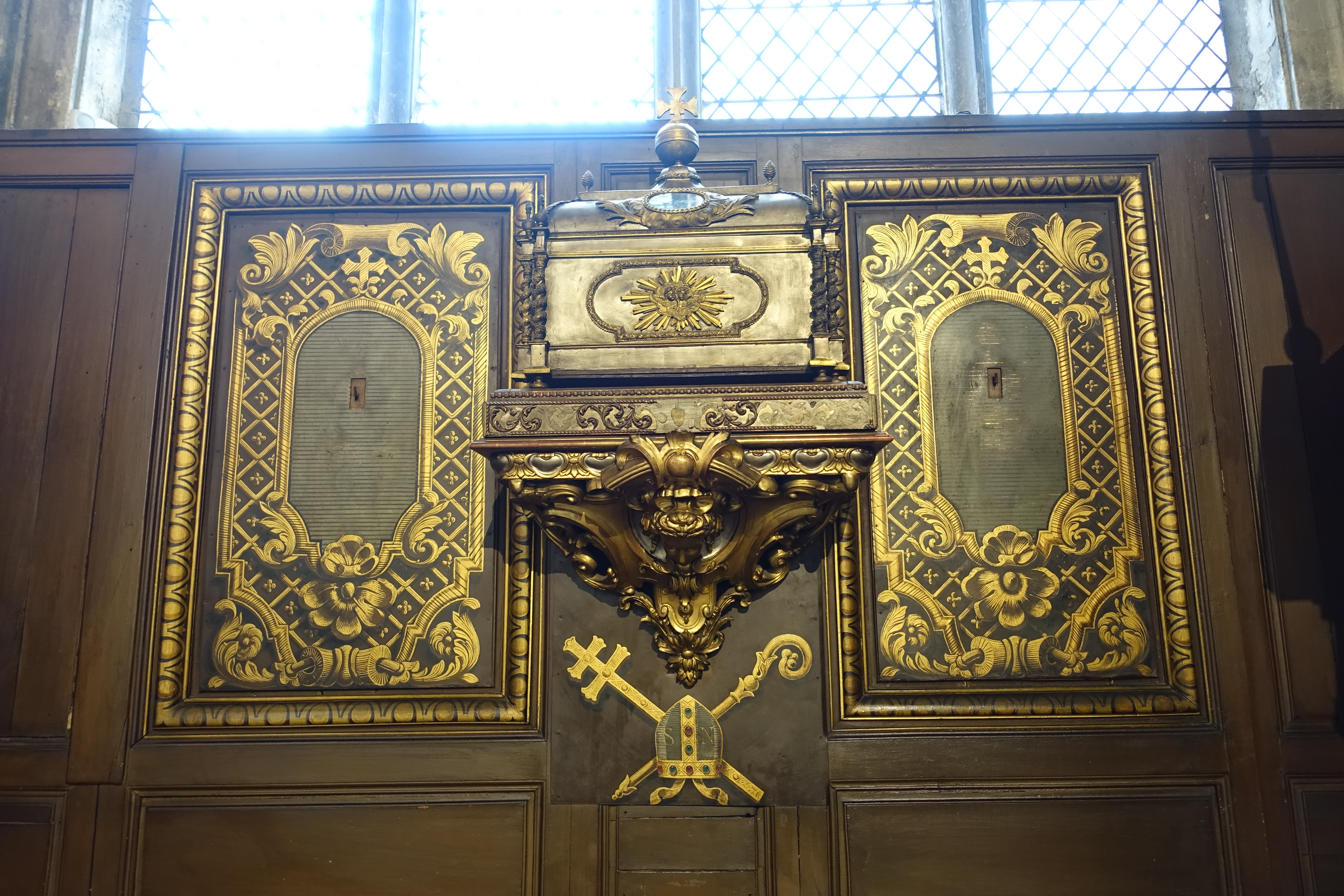
Detail of the carved and gilded interior, west porch

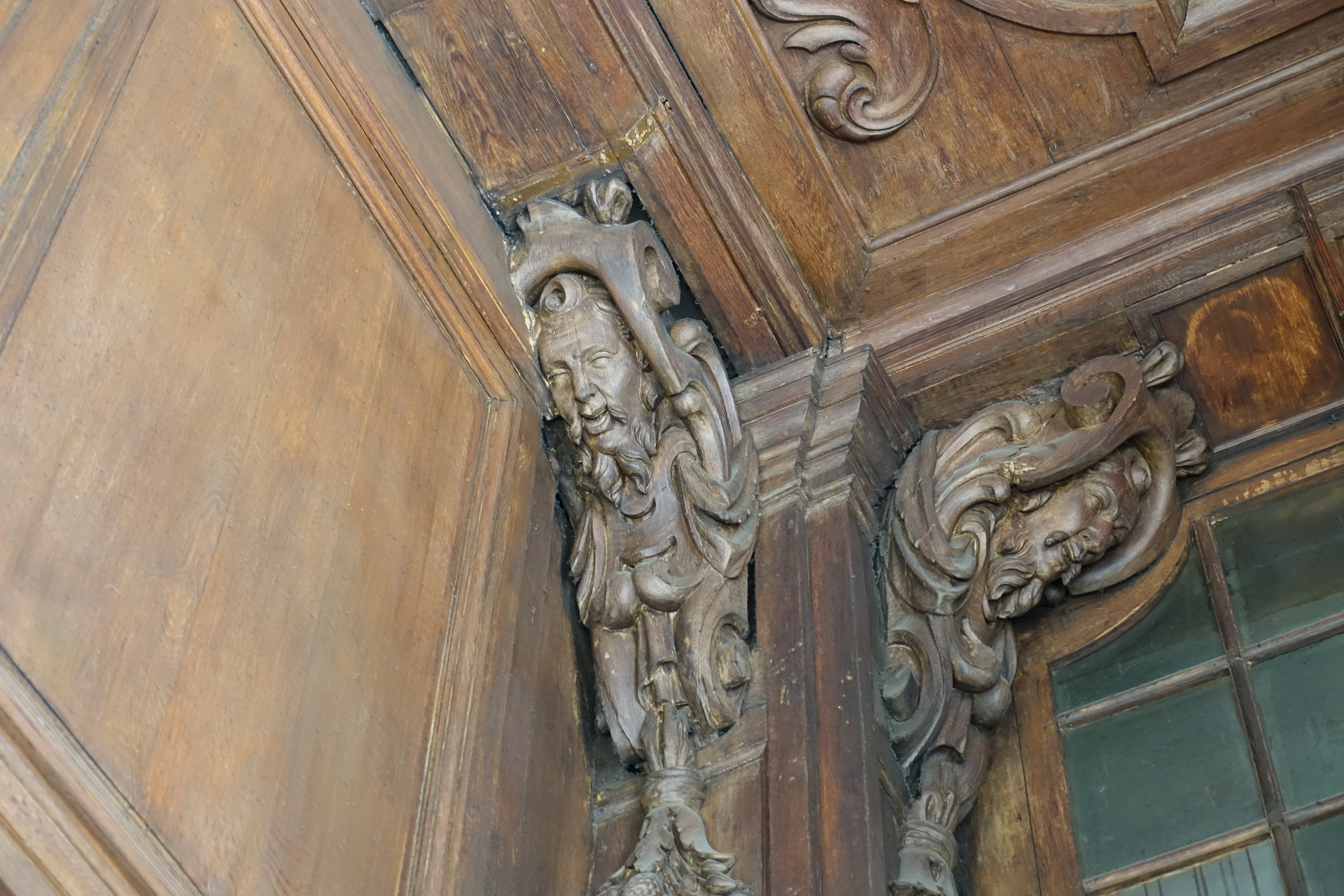
Detail of the west porch carvings

The west porch is the vestibule of the church, and was frequently used for ceremonies, including baptisms, blessings of wedded couples, and the presentation of alms to the poor. The wood carving and sculpture was made in 1647–1649 by Adrien Lepautre and Philippe de Buyster. The ceiling is supported by two large consoles, in the forms of the torsos of women with wings. They also made an ornate carved bench in the interior of the church for the church wardens who were responsible for the elderly parishioners. This bench disappeared during the Revolution. It was replaced in 1806 with a new bench, now on the north side of the nave, made by the master wood carver Jacob-Desmalter, who made furnishings for the residences of Napoleon. It formerly had eight carved columns, but these were removed in 1856.

== Art and decoration ==
=== The retable or altarpiece (17th c.) ===
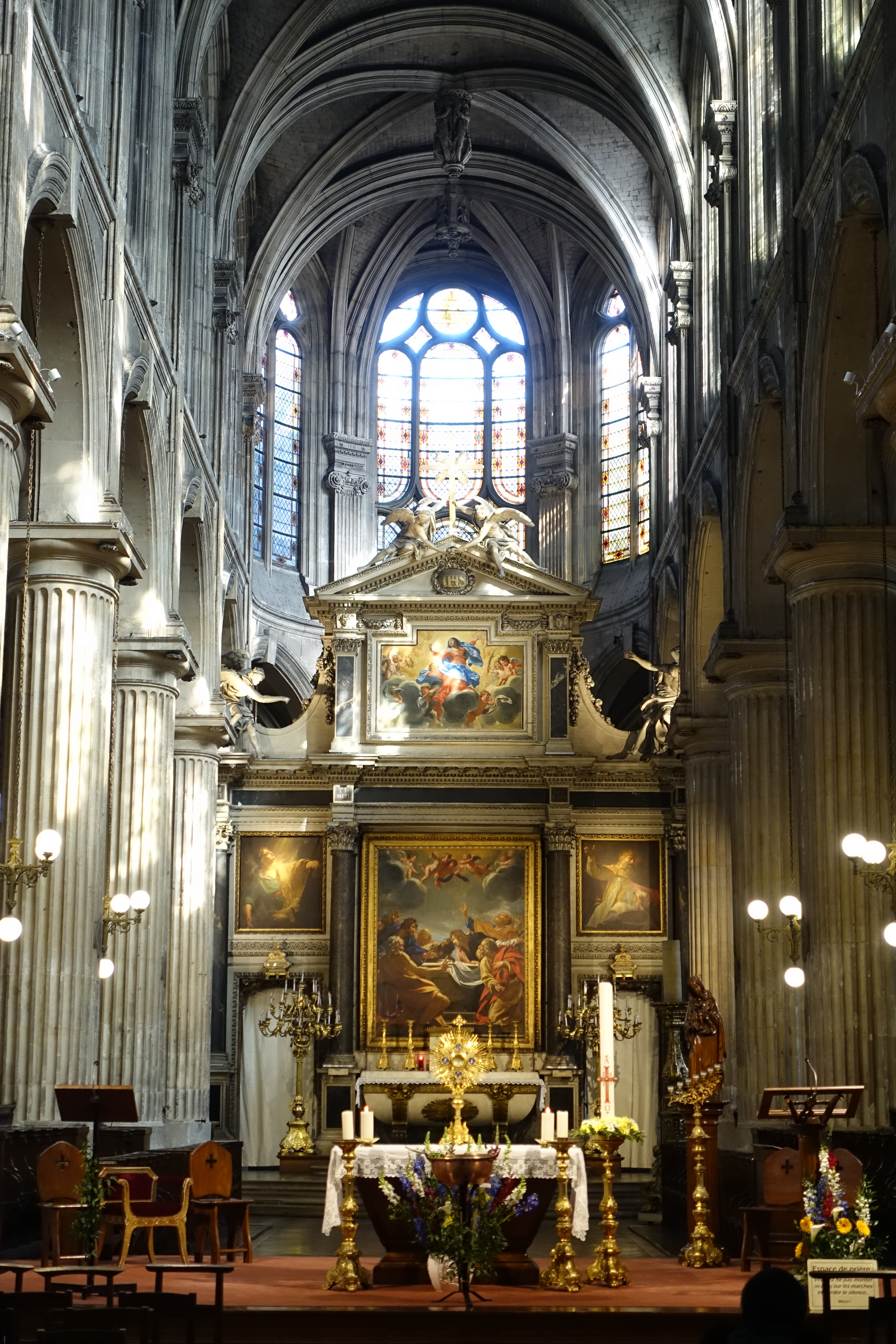
Retable of Saint-Nicolas-des-Champs (1629)

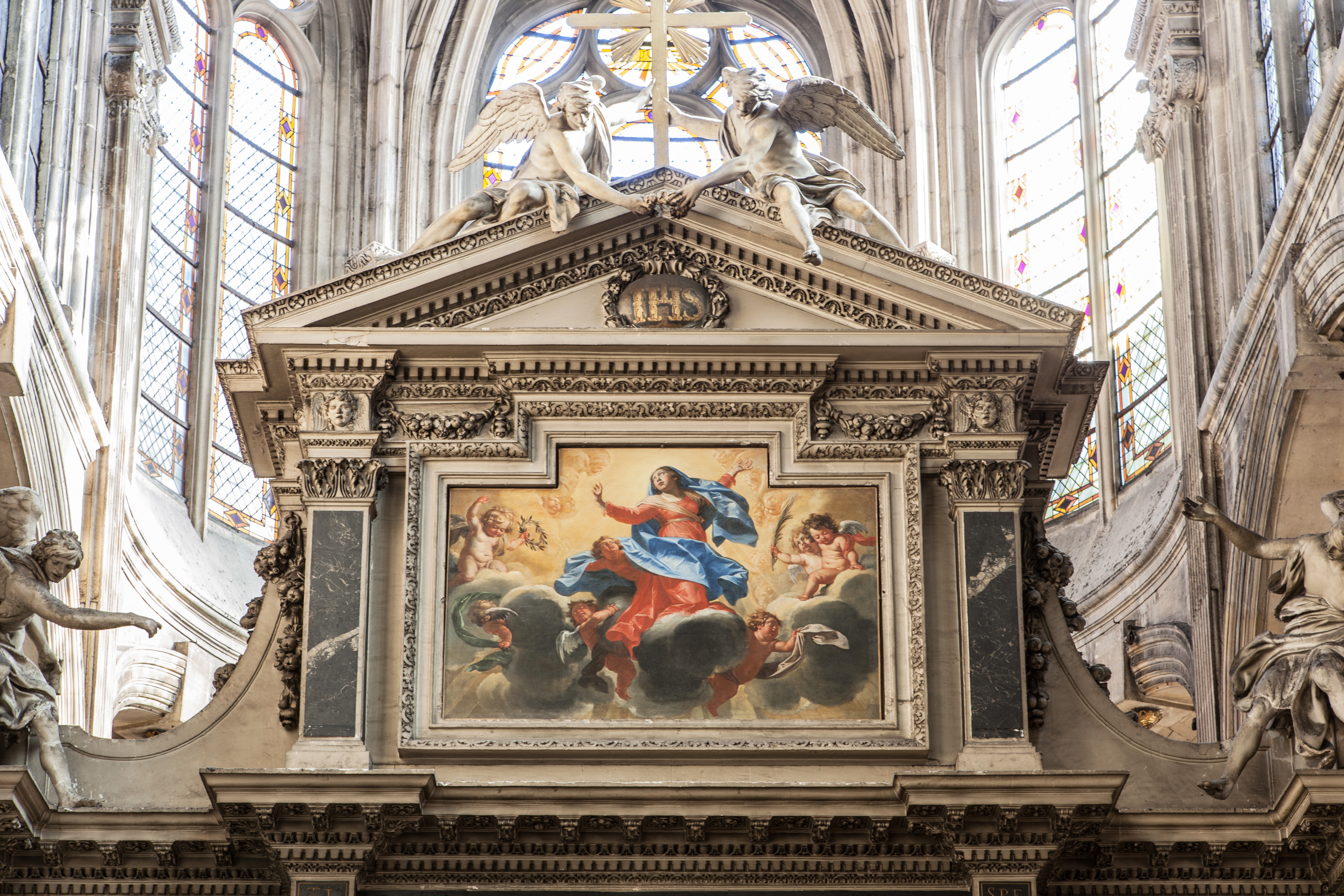
The Assumption of the Virgin" (top painting), by Simon Vouet

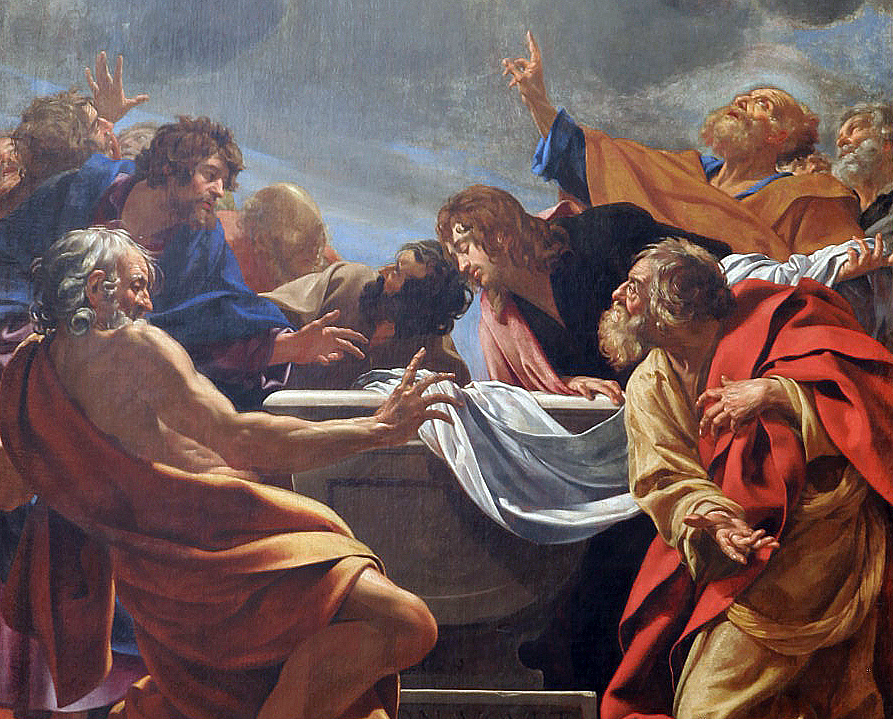
Detail of "The Assumption of the Virgin" lower painting in Retable by Simon Vouet

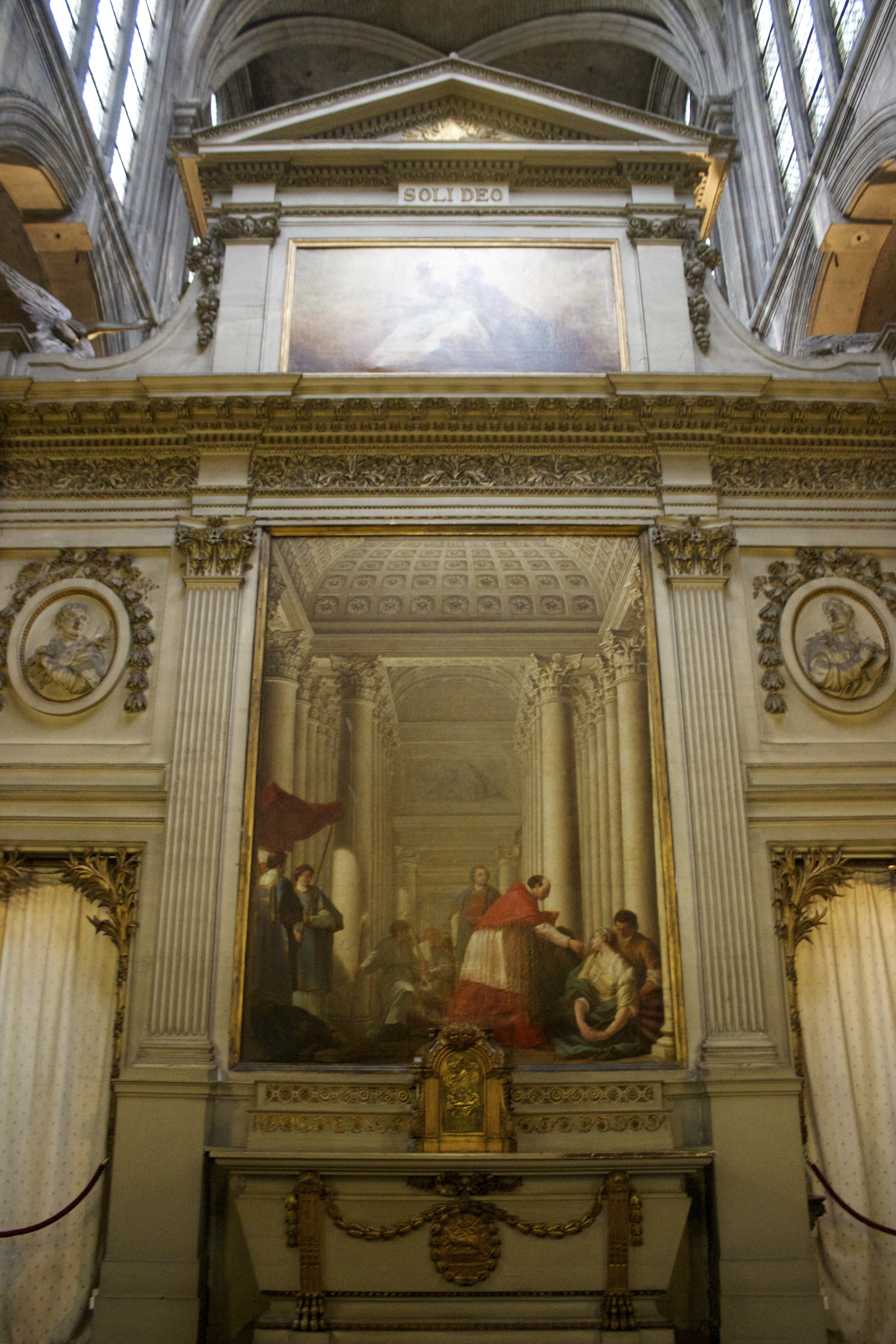
The Retable (1629)

The most dramatic feature of the interior is the retable, or altarpiece. It was finished in 1629, and is one of the rare examples a major altarpiece from the 17th century in Paris. The altar was made by the sculptor Jacques Sarazin (1592–1660. It occupies the entire choir, and takes the architectural form of the Jesuit churches of Rome. It was designed primarily to display two paintings by Simon Vouet (1590–1649): "The Apostles at the Tomb of the Virgin" (Bottom) and "The Assumption of the Virgin", top. depicting the glory of heaven. A group of angels at the top the lower painting serves as a link between the two subjects.

=== Frescos ===
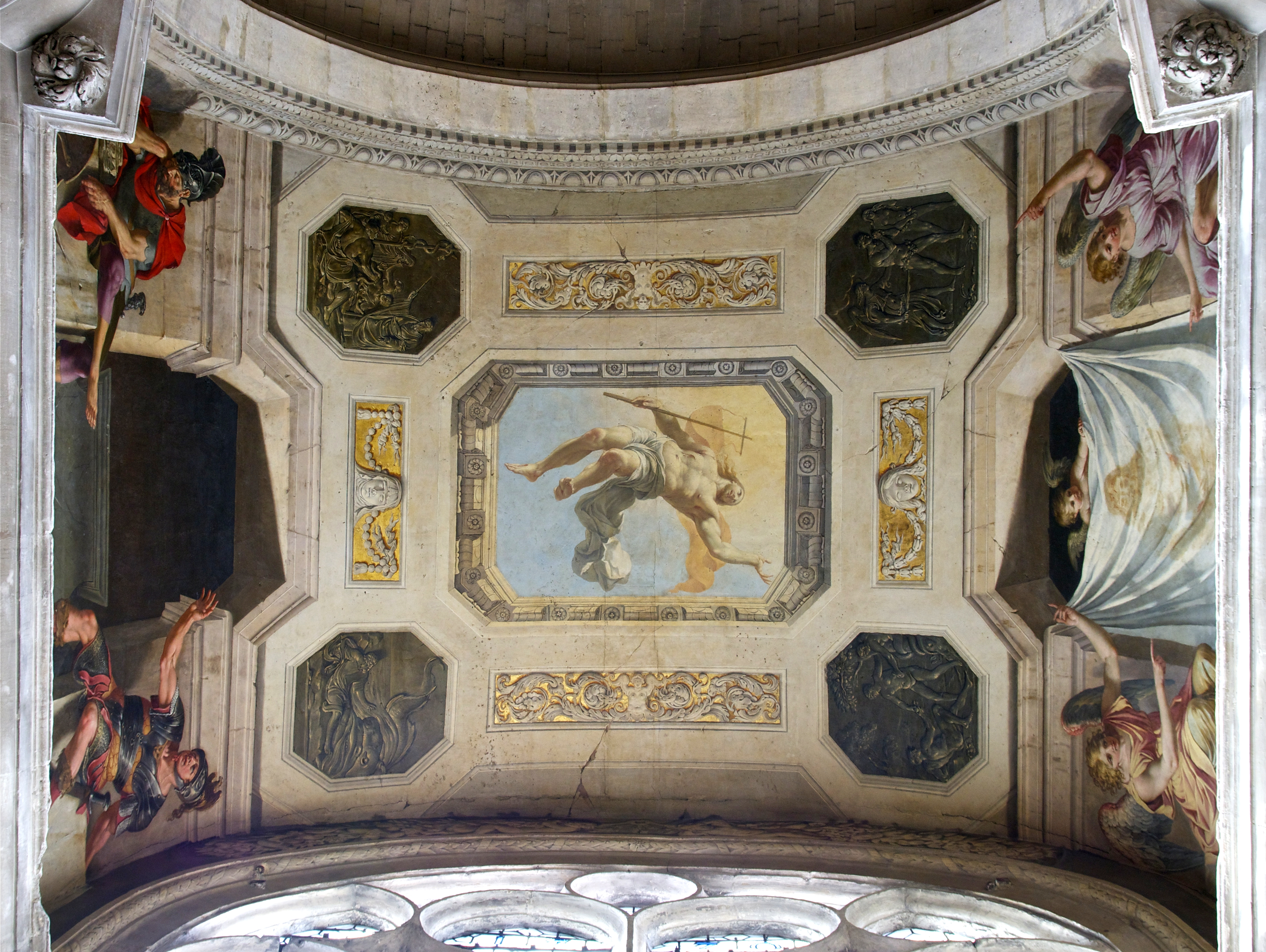
The Resurrection fresco vault, by Michel Corneille the Elder (1601-1664),

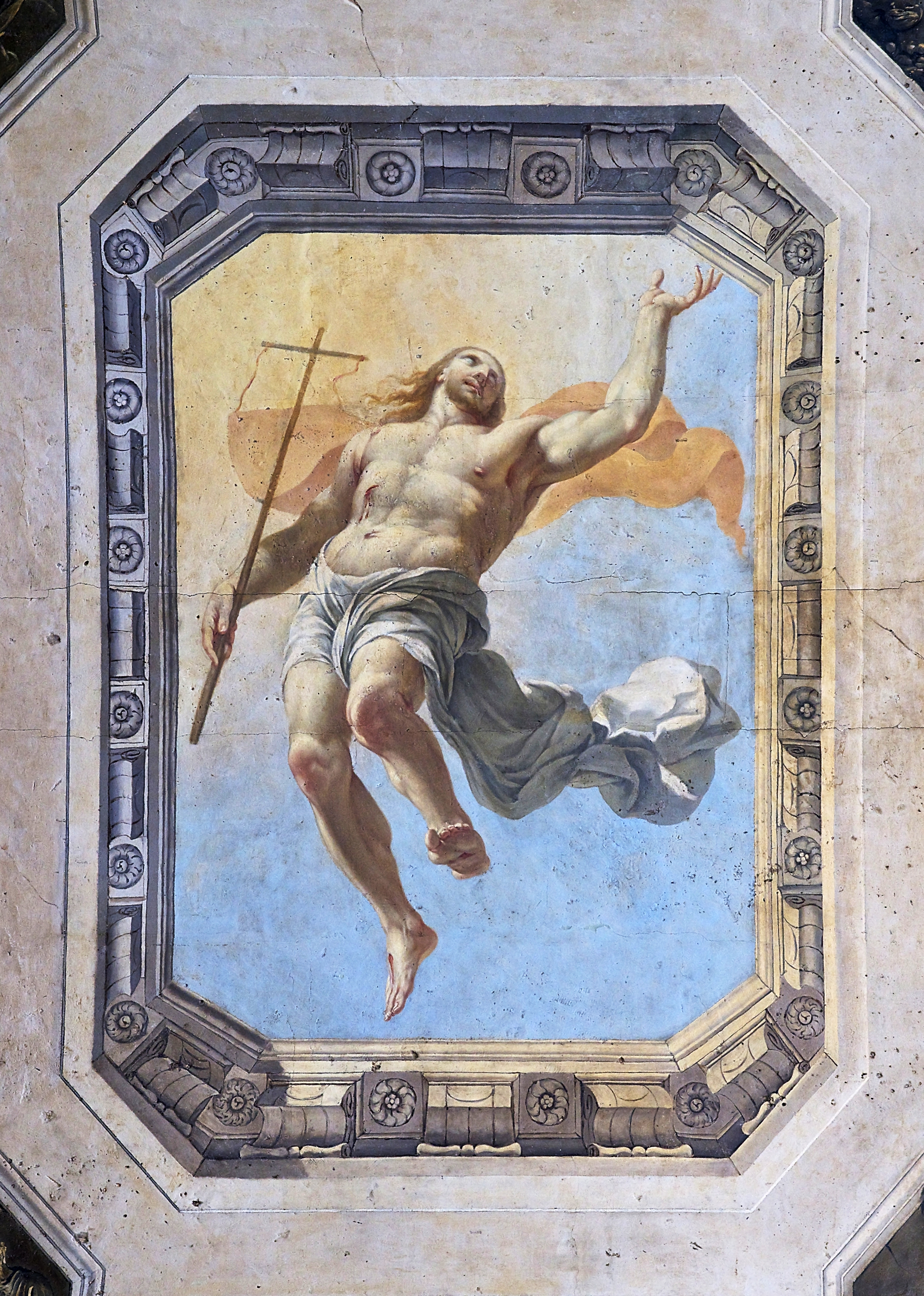
Detail of the Resurrection fresco vault, by Michel Corneille the Elder (1601-1664)

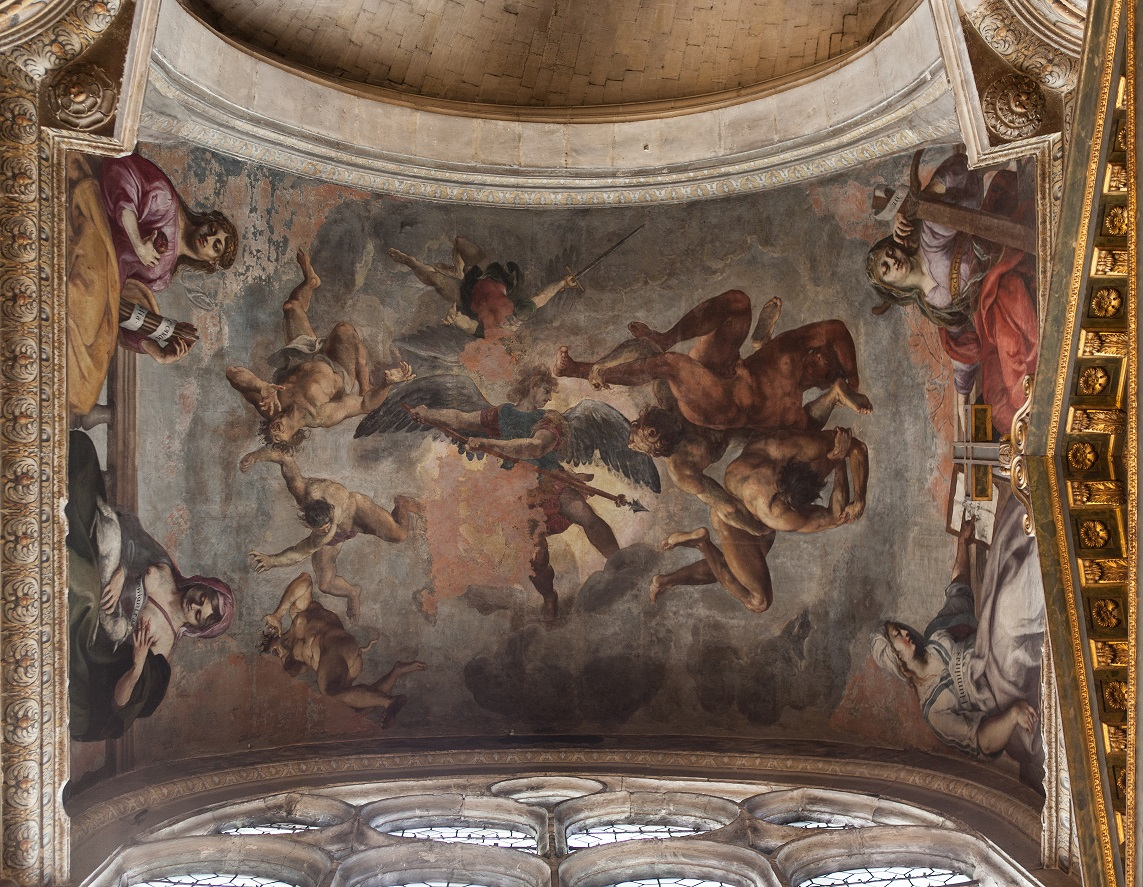
"Fall of the Rebel Angels", by Quentin Varin (Chapel 16)

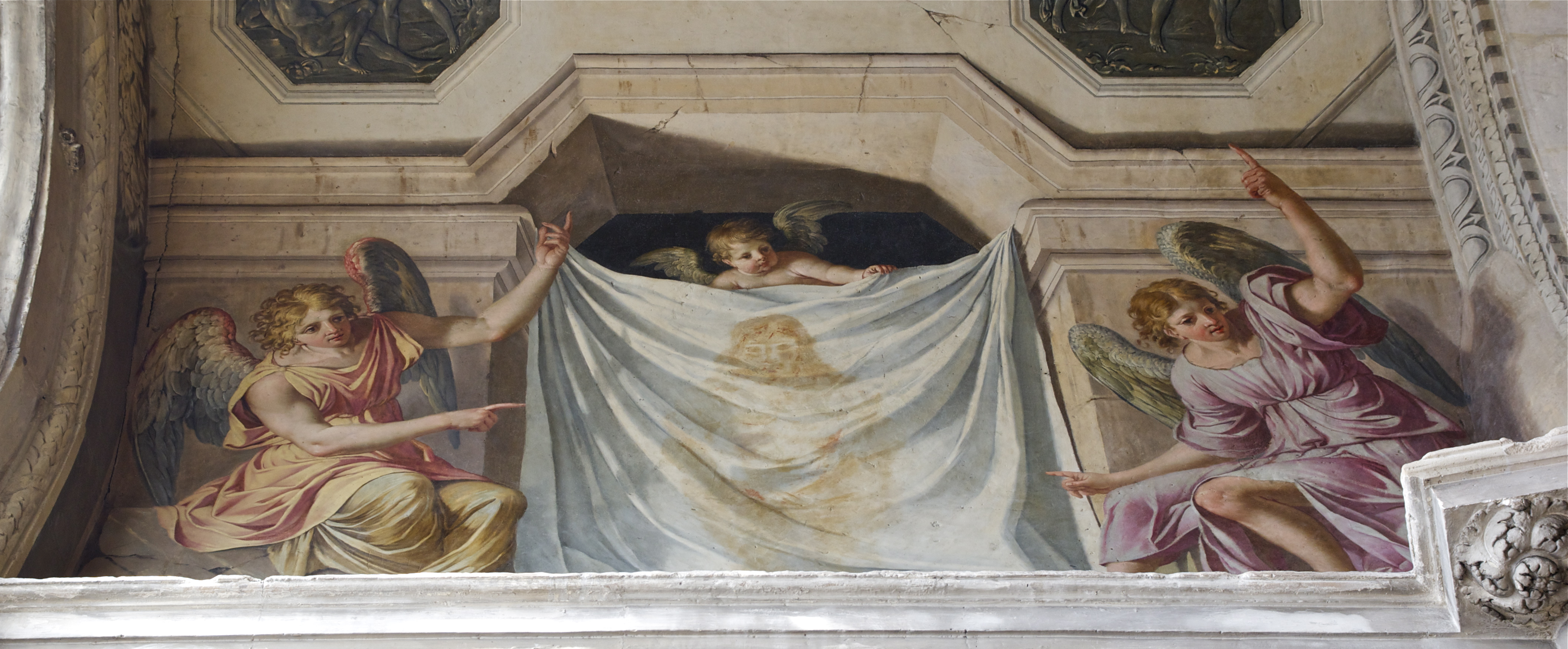
Vault of Chapel 21 (south side), with angels and the Holy Shroud

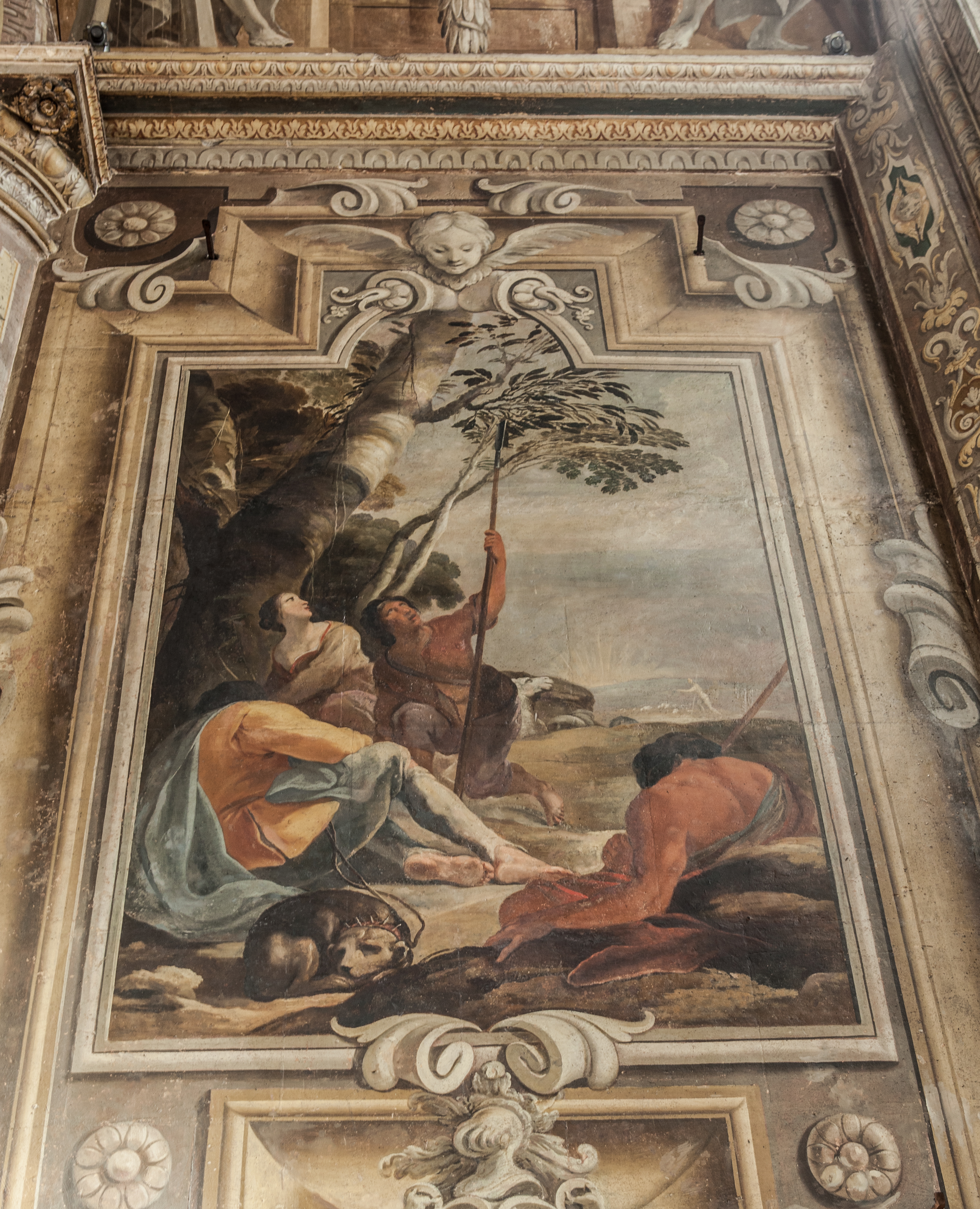
The Announciation to the Shepherds, by Nicolas Chaperon (1612-1656)

The Frescoes on the walls and ceilings of the chapels represent the work of some of the major French artists of the 17th century. Nicolas Chaperon was a student of Poussin in Rome, and Michel Corneille the Elder and Quentin Varin created major decorative work in Paris churches. The most famous work of Michel Corneille the Elder, "St. Paul and St. Barnabas at Lystra", is found in Notre Dame de Paris.

=== Paintings in chapels ===
The thirty-three chapels of the church present a varied and colourful galley of works by major French religious painters, as well as Italians and Spaniards, of the 16th and 17th centuries.

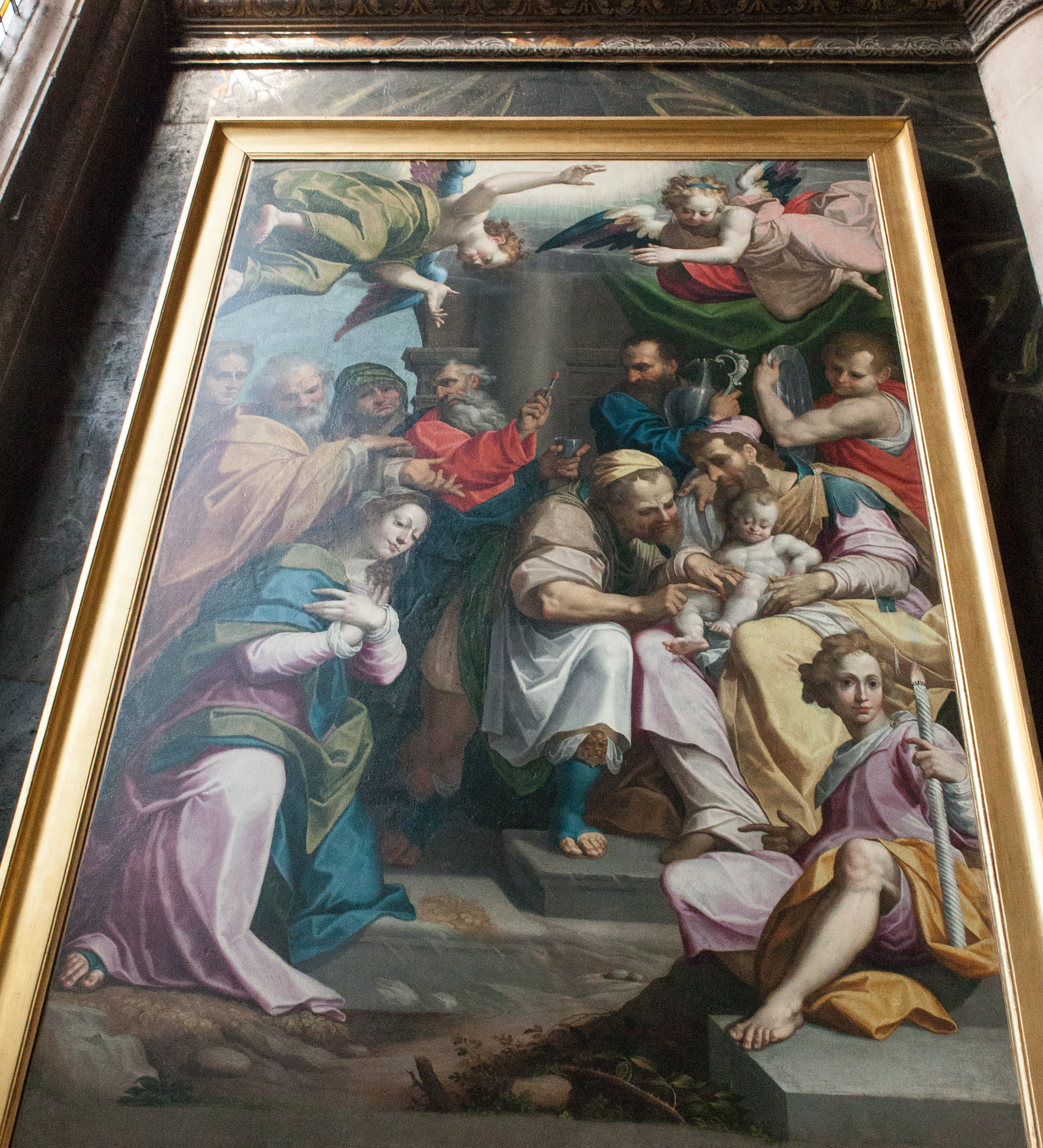
"The Circoncision of Christ" by Giovanni Battista Trotti (1559-1619)(Chapel of the Saviour, Disambulatory)

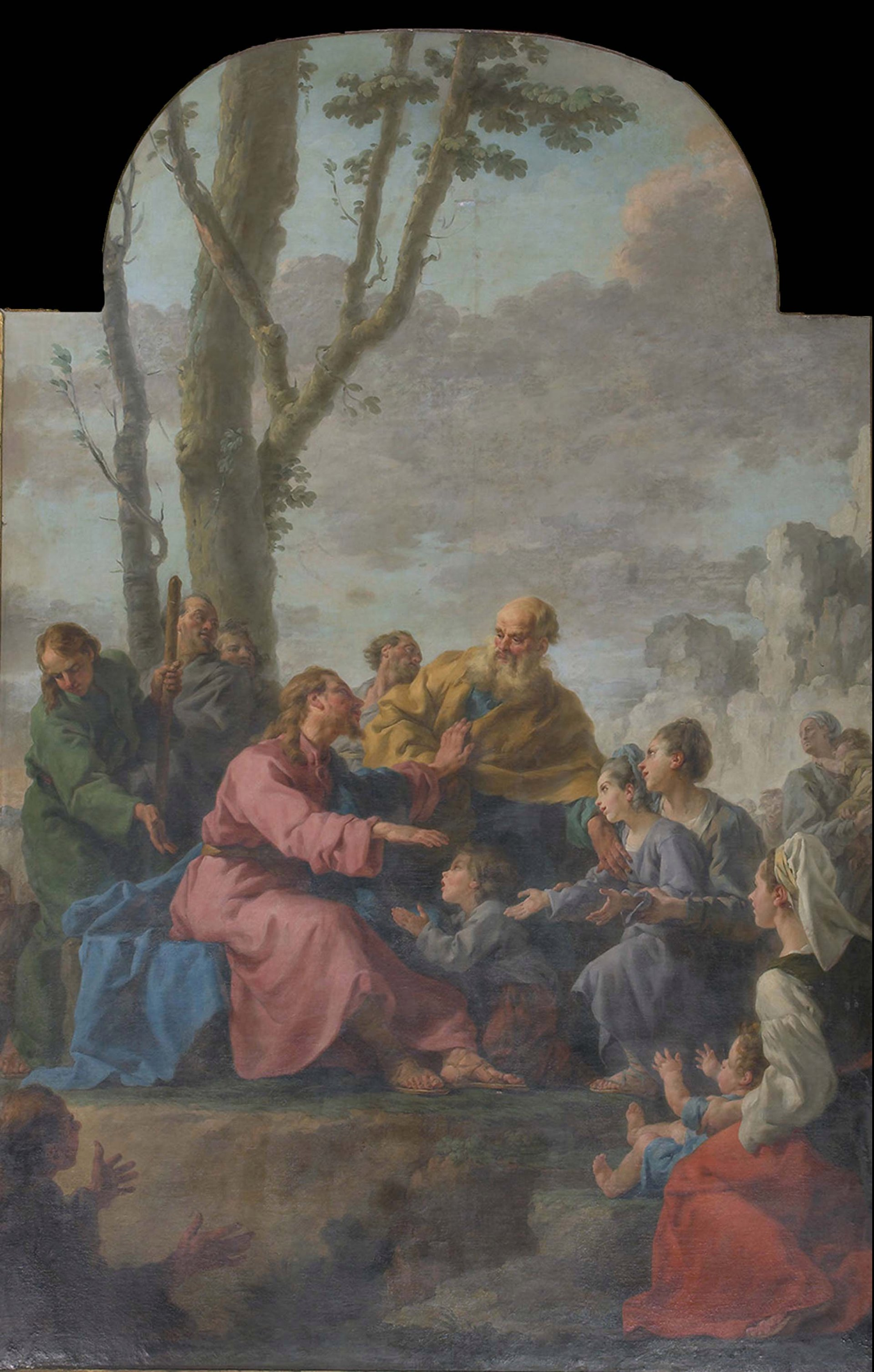
"Christ and the Children" by Noël Hallé (1775), (Chapel 1)

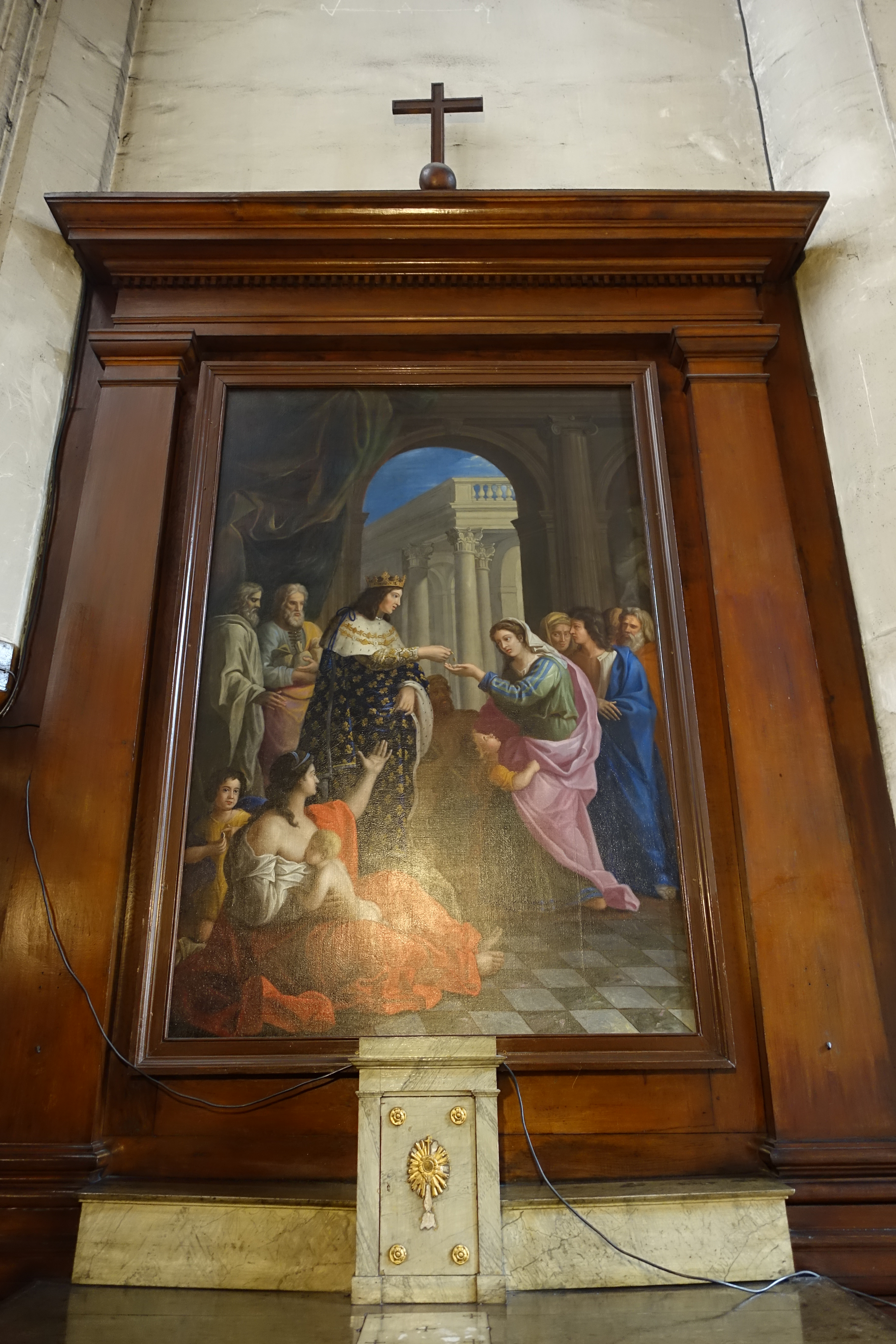
"Saint Louis giving alms", (Chapel 8)

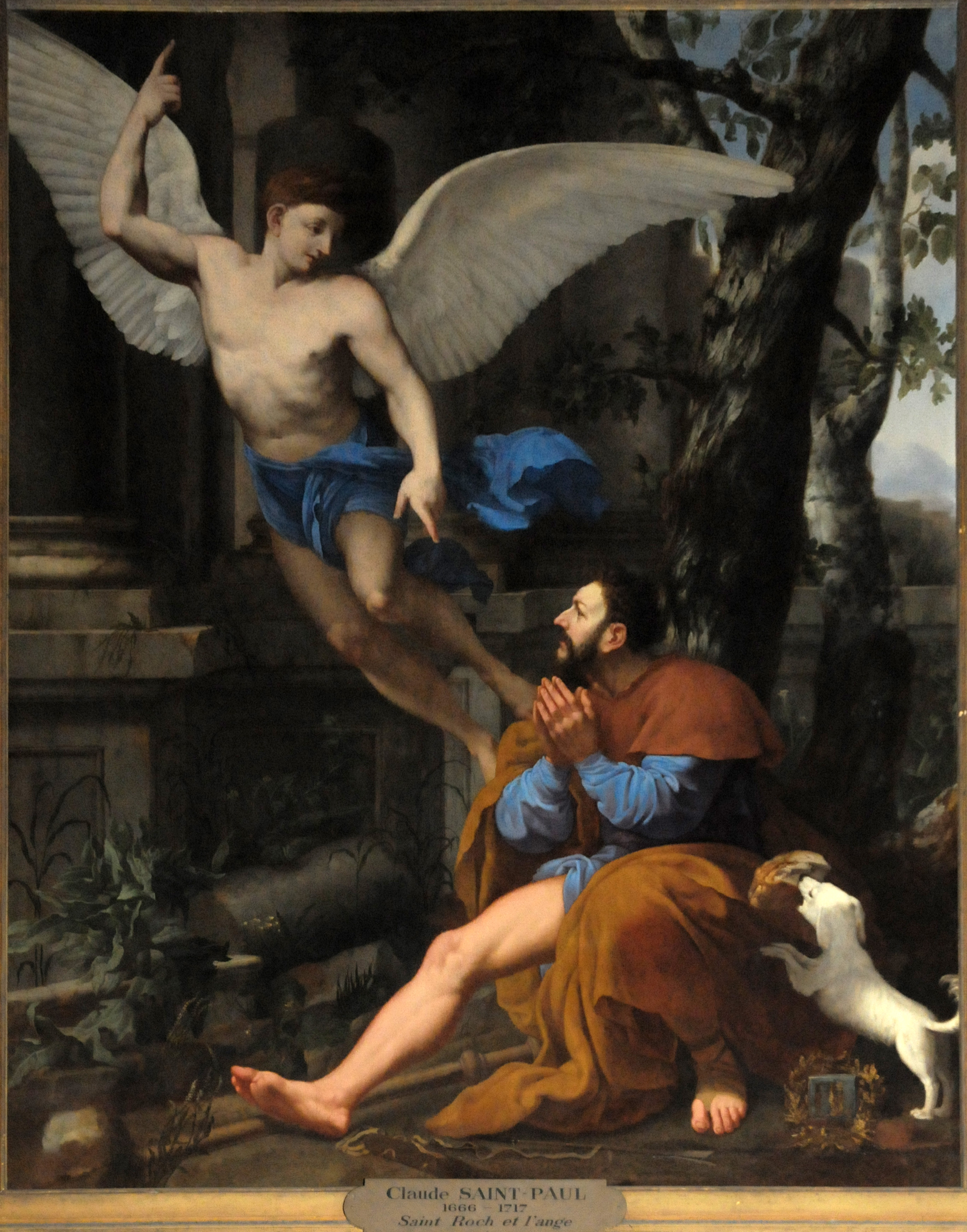
"Saint Roche and the Angel" by Claude Simpol (c. 1680-1700) (Chapel 17, now entrance to sacristy)

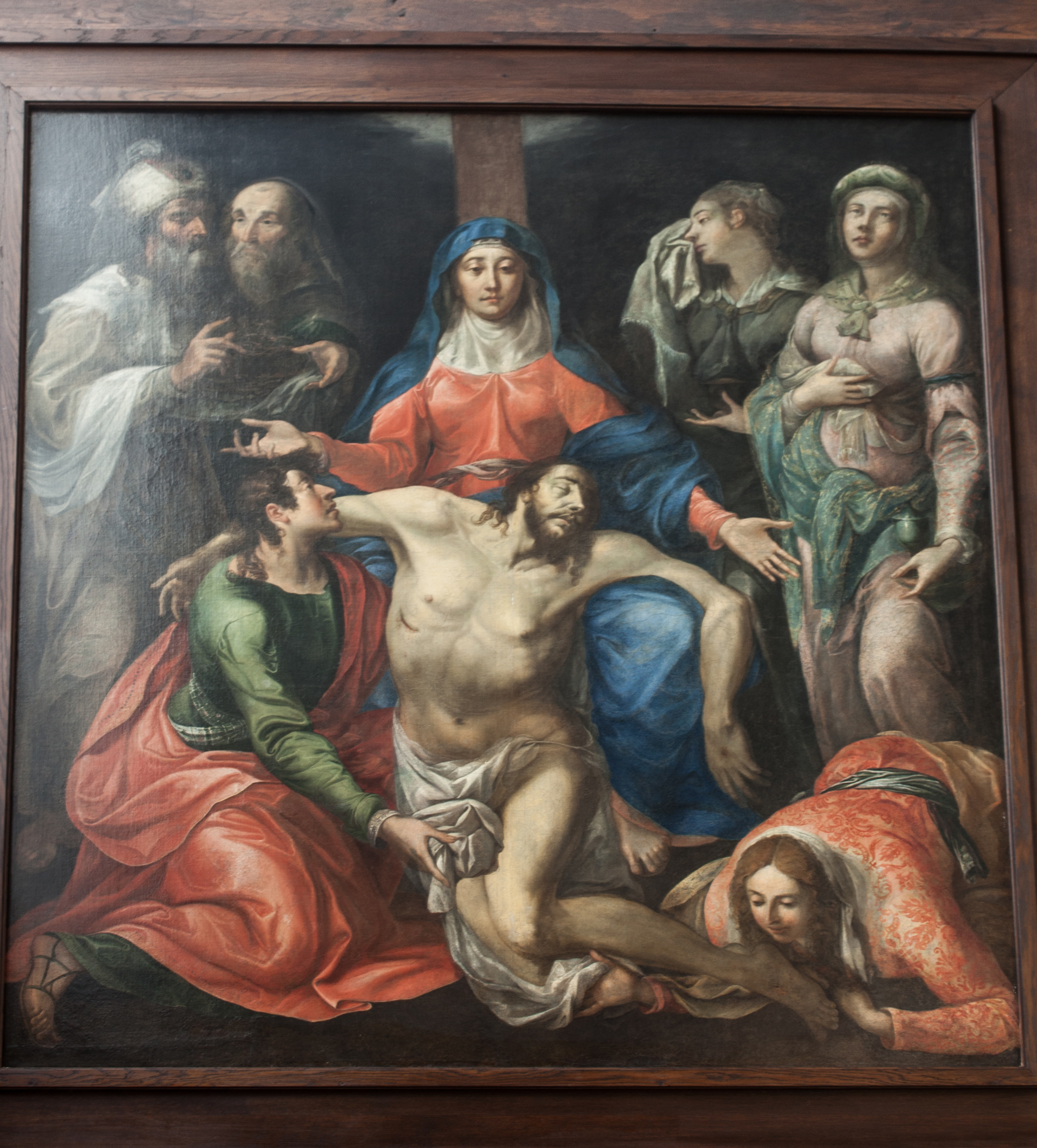
"The Virgin of Pity" by Georges Lallemant (Chapel of Compassion, left collateral aisle))

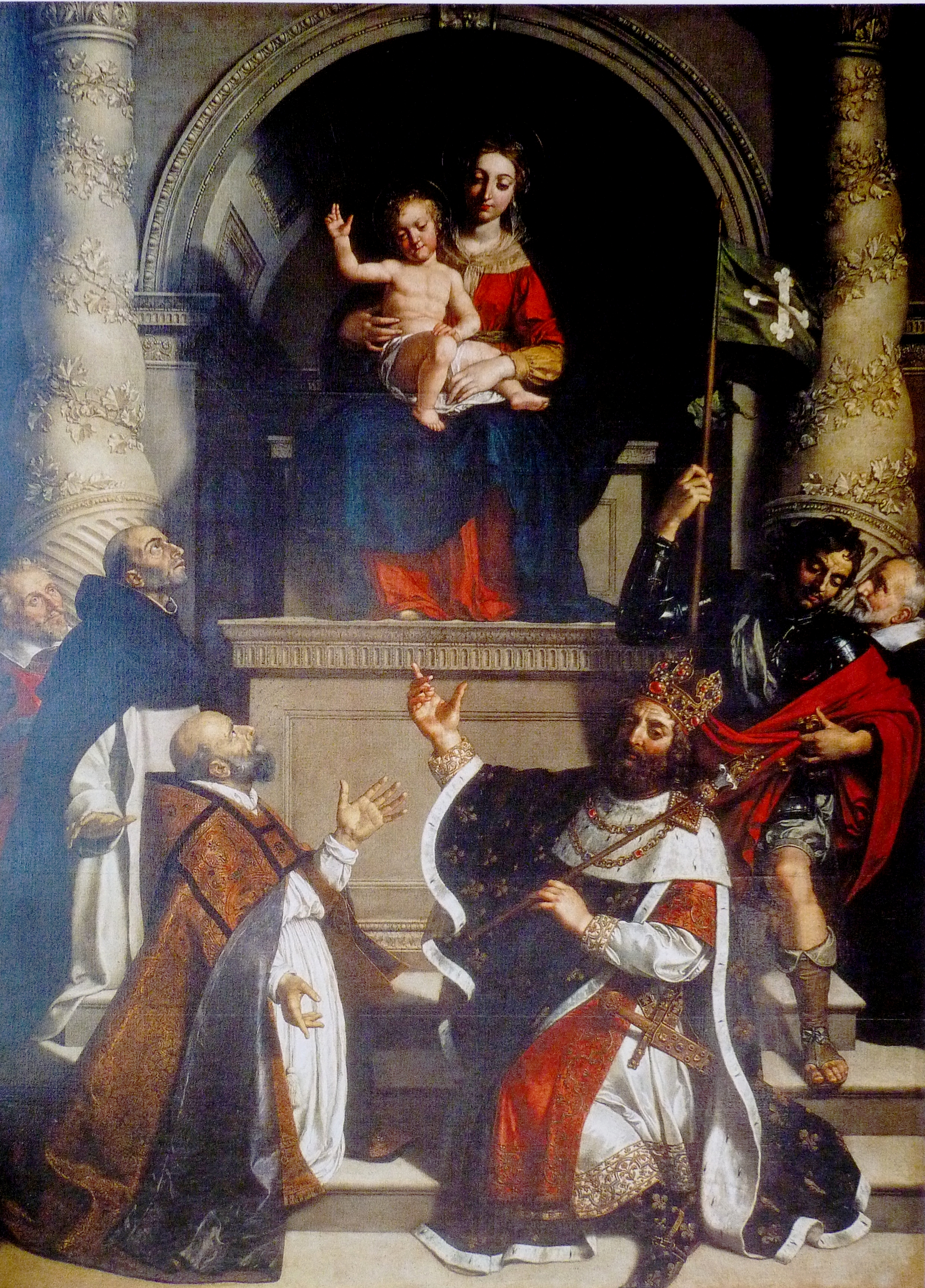
"The Madonna of the Vic Family", by the Frans Pourbus the Younger (1617)

"The Circumcision of Christ" by Giovanni Battista Trotti (1559-1619) was an important Italian Mannerist painter. This work was seized by Napoleon's army from a chapel in Cremona during his Italian campaign, like a number of paintings in Paris churches, and was carried to Paris. It is now found in the Chapel of the Saviour in the disambulatory.

One important early work is "The Madonna of the Vic Family", by the celebrated Flemish portrait painter, Frans Pourbus the Younger (1617). It portrays Louis IX with his sword, sceptre, and golden spurs, adoring the Virgin and the Christ Child. It takes its name from the donors, Méry and Dominique Vic, who also appear in the painting. It is found in chapel 23, the Chapel of Saint Anne, on the disambulatory around the apse.

Another important early work is "The Virgin of Pity" by Georges Lallemant, found in the Chapel of Compassion on the left collateral aisle. In addition to the Virgin and Christ, it depicts Nicodemus and Joseph of Aramathea, as well as Saint John and Mary Magdelene at the feet of Christ.

The more modern Spanish realist painter Leon Bonnat (1833-1922) is represented by the painting "Saint Vincent de Paul repurchases the galley slaves", found in the Chapel of the Holy Family in the left collateral aisle. His works are also found in the Panthéon and the Hotel de Ville, Paris.

The disambulatory is also decorated with a modern work by the contemporary artist Jean-Paul Froidevaux. an updated version of the Stations of the Cross. in vivid and warm colors.

=== Stained glass ===
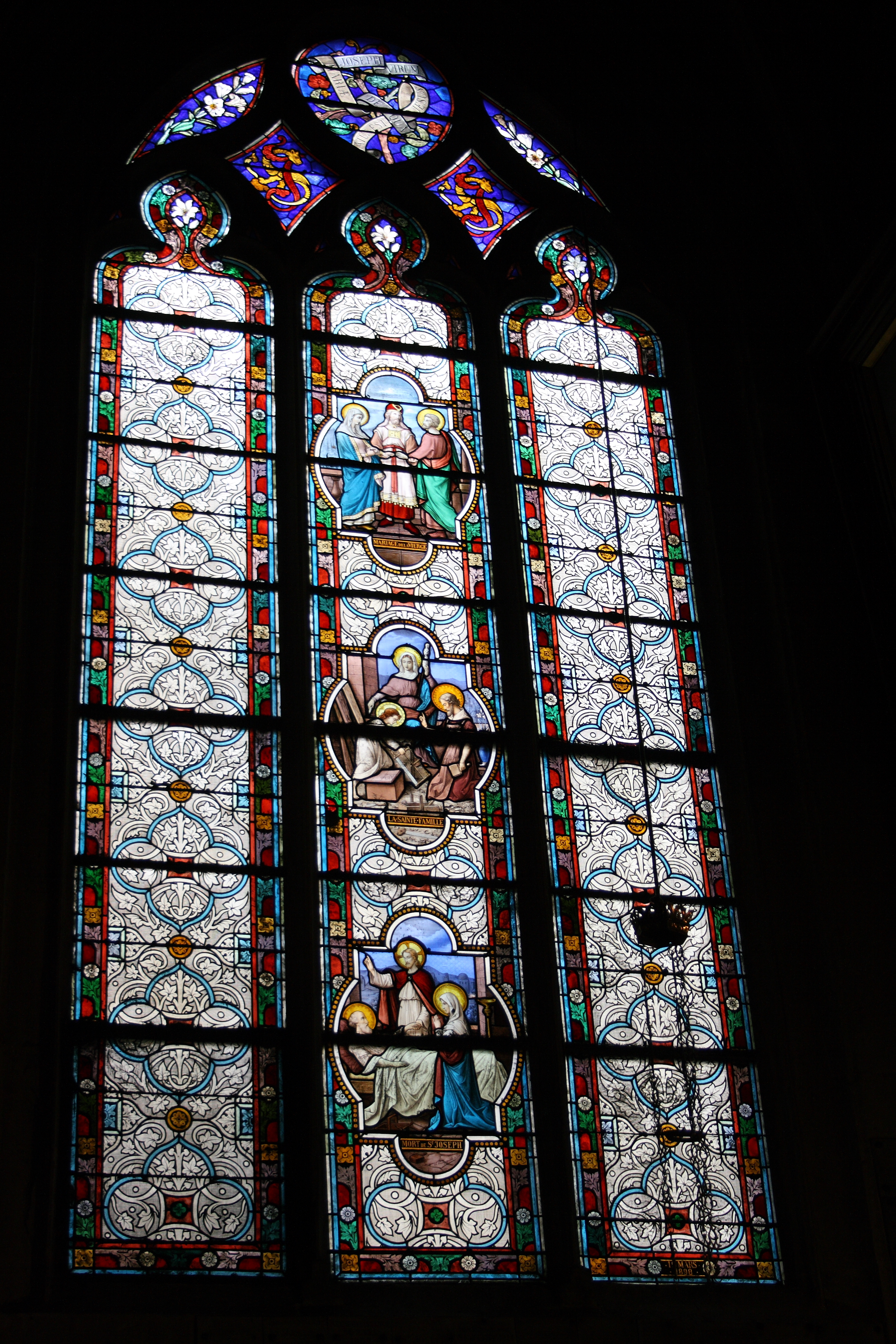
Stained glass of the choir

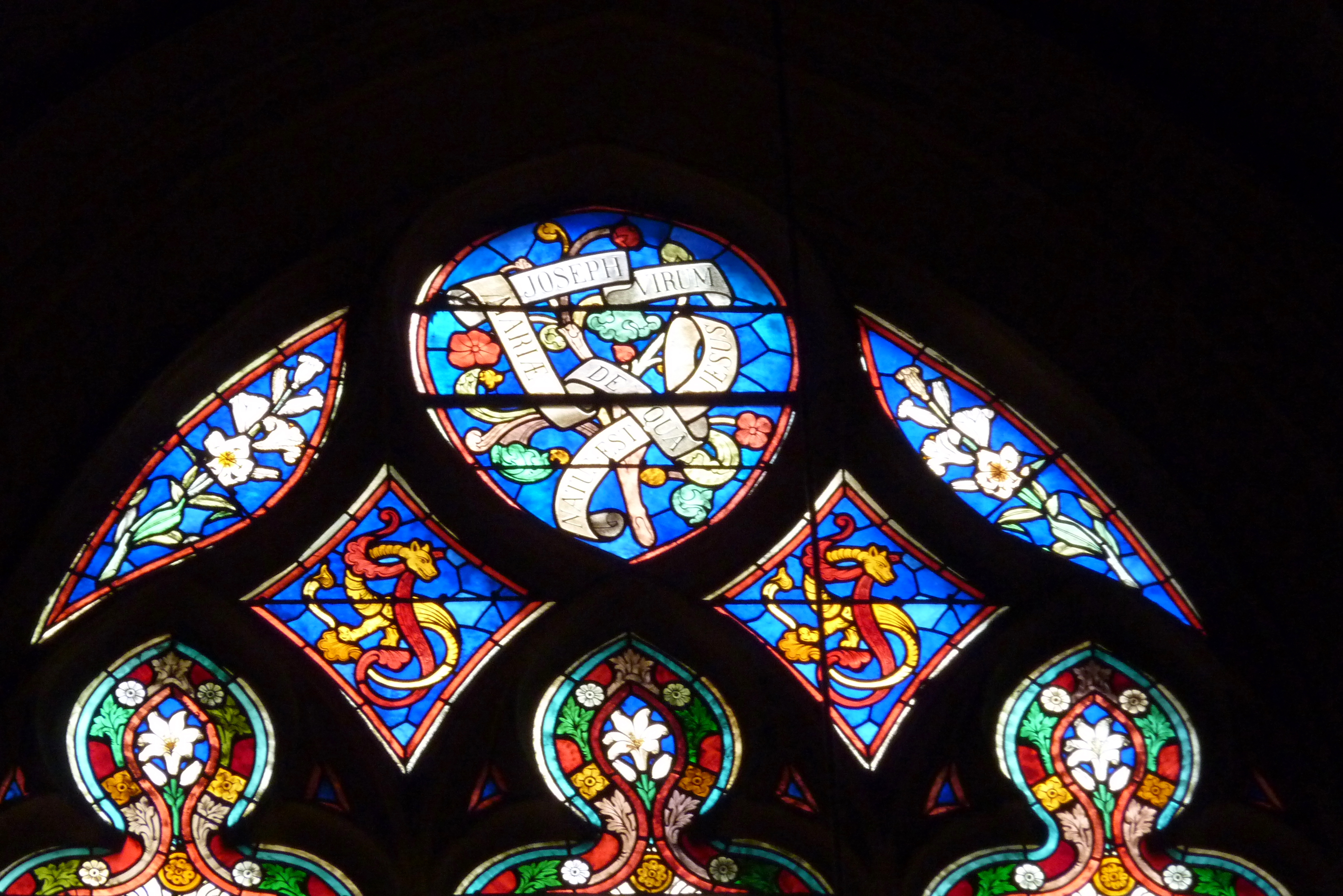
Stained glass of the choir

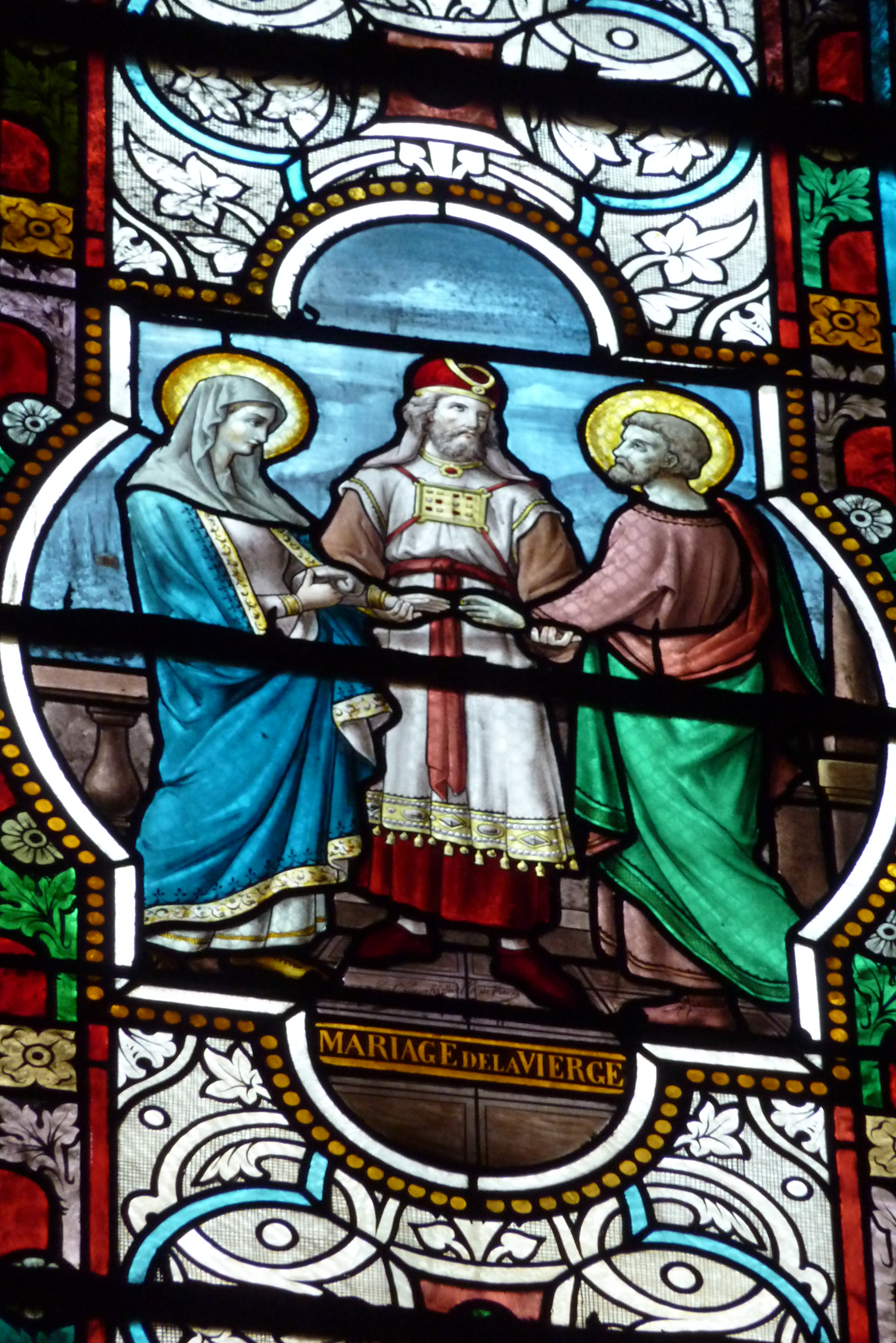
Stained glass depicting of marriage of Mary and Joseph

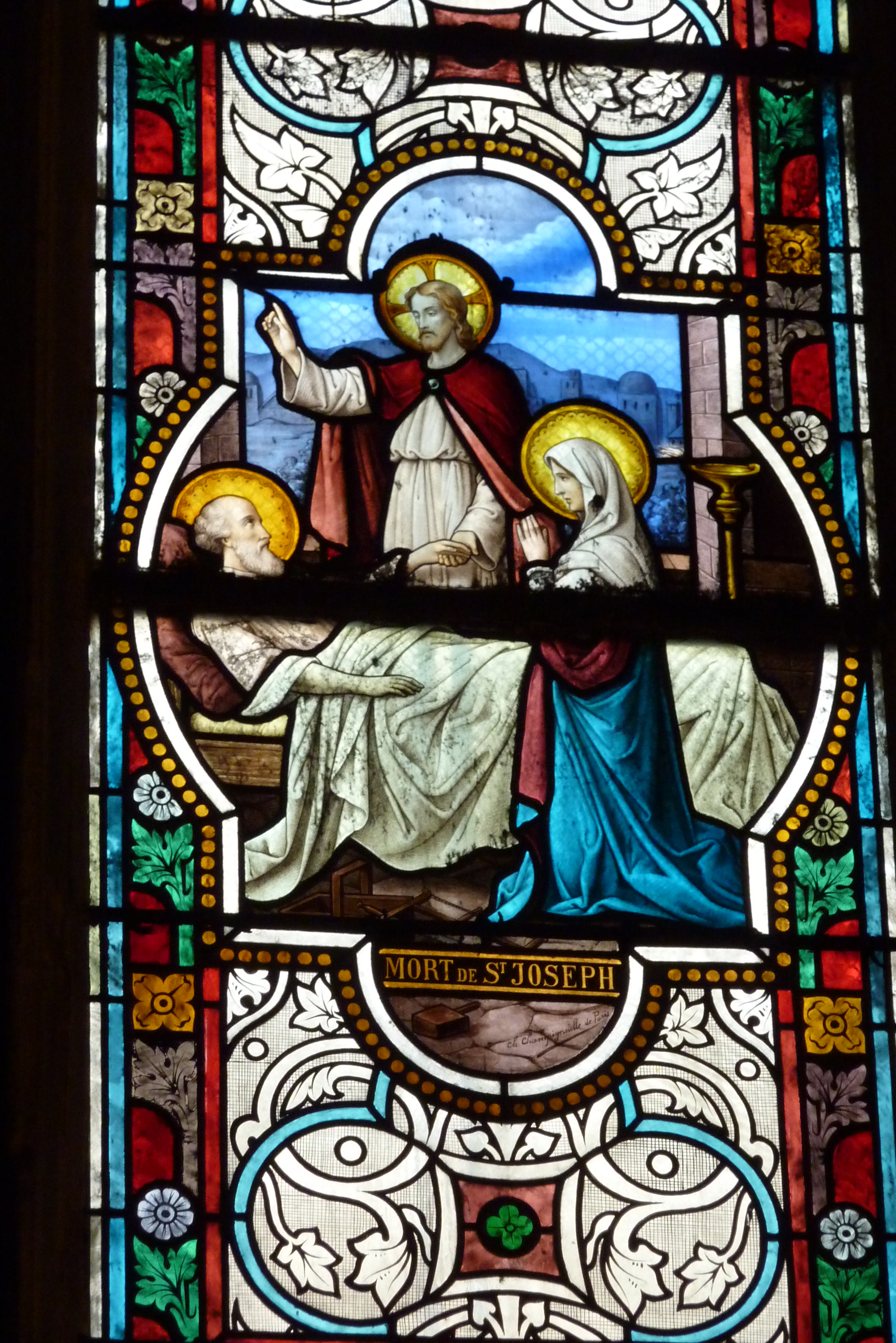
Detail of stained glass

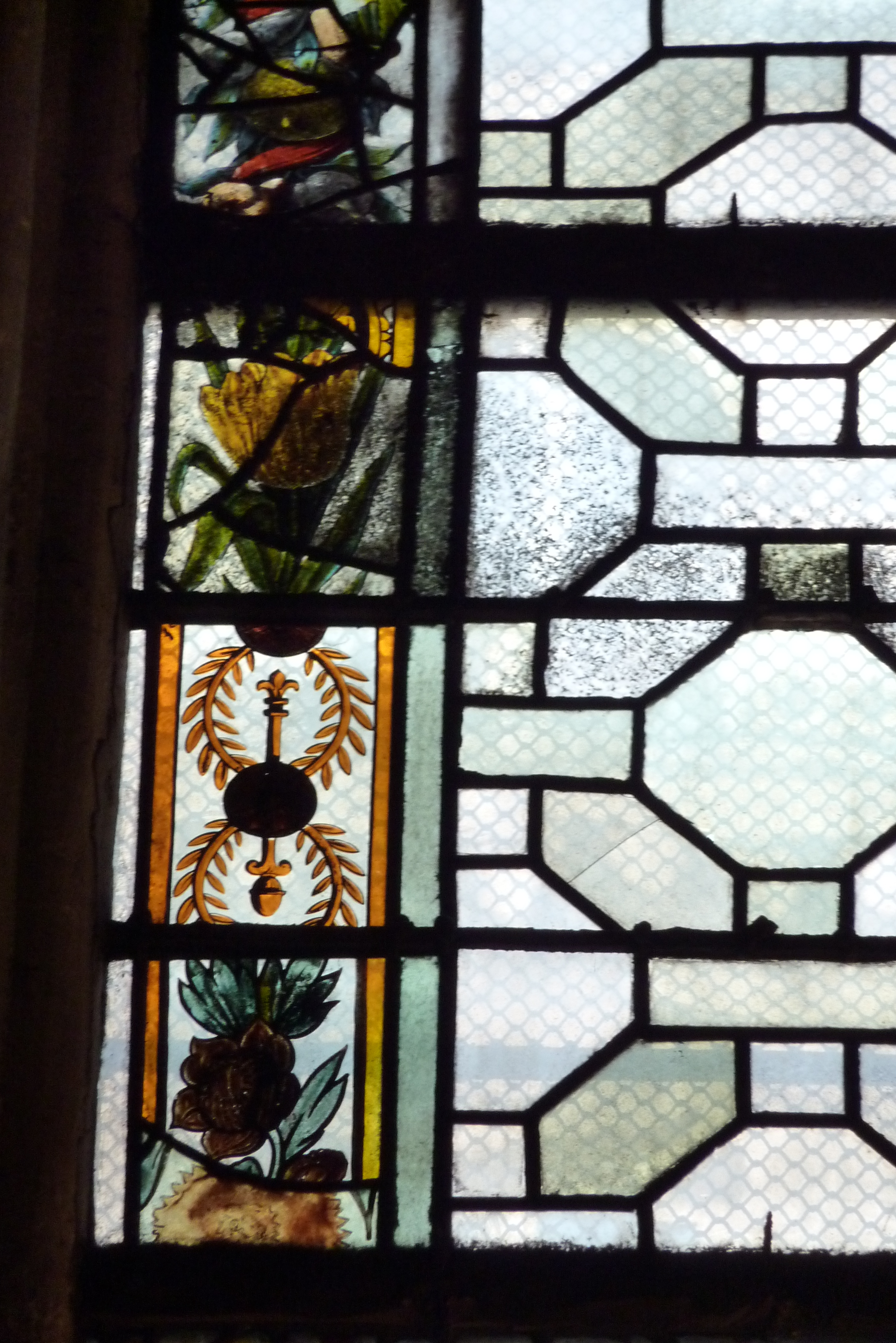
Detail of border of stained glass

The stained glass windows, like most such windows during the Baroque and classical period, were made with largely white glass, designed to admit a maximum of light, to make reading text easier and to make the art inside more visible. The figures and details on most of the stained glass in this period was painted on the glass with various mineral compounds such as silver stain, then baked onto the glass, to give three dimensions and shading and other effects similar to paintings.

== Organs ==
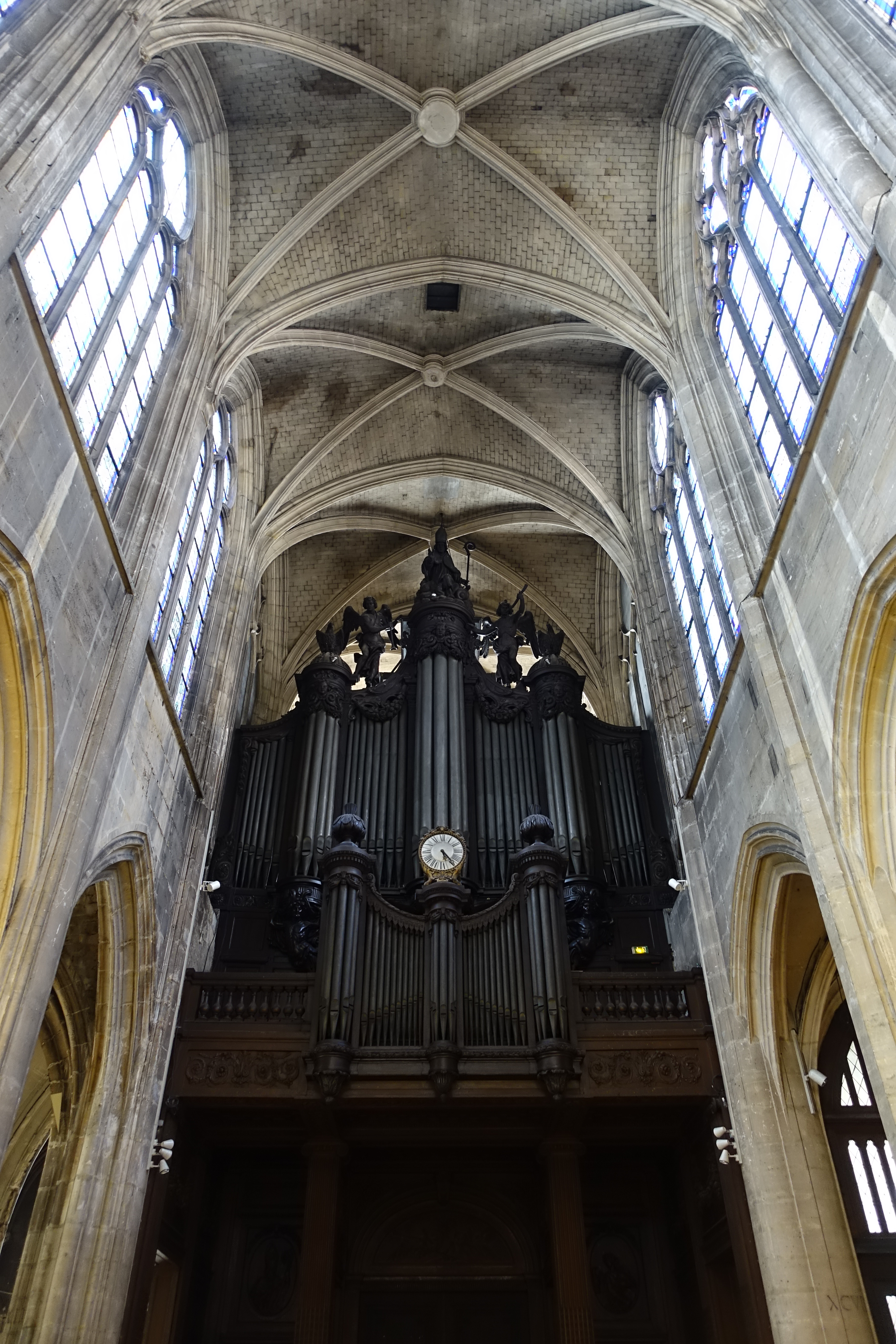
View of the grand organ over the west end

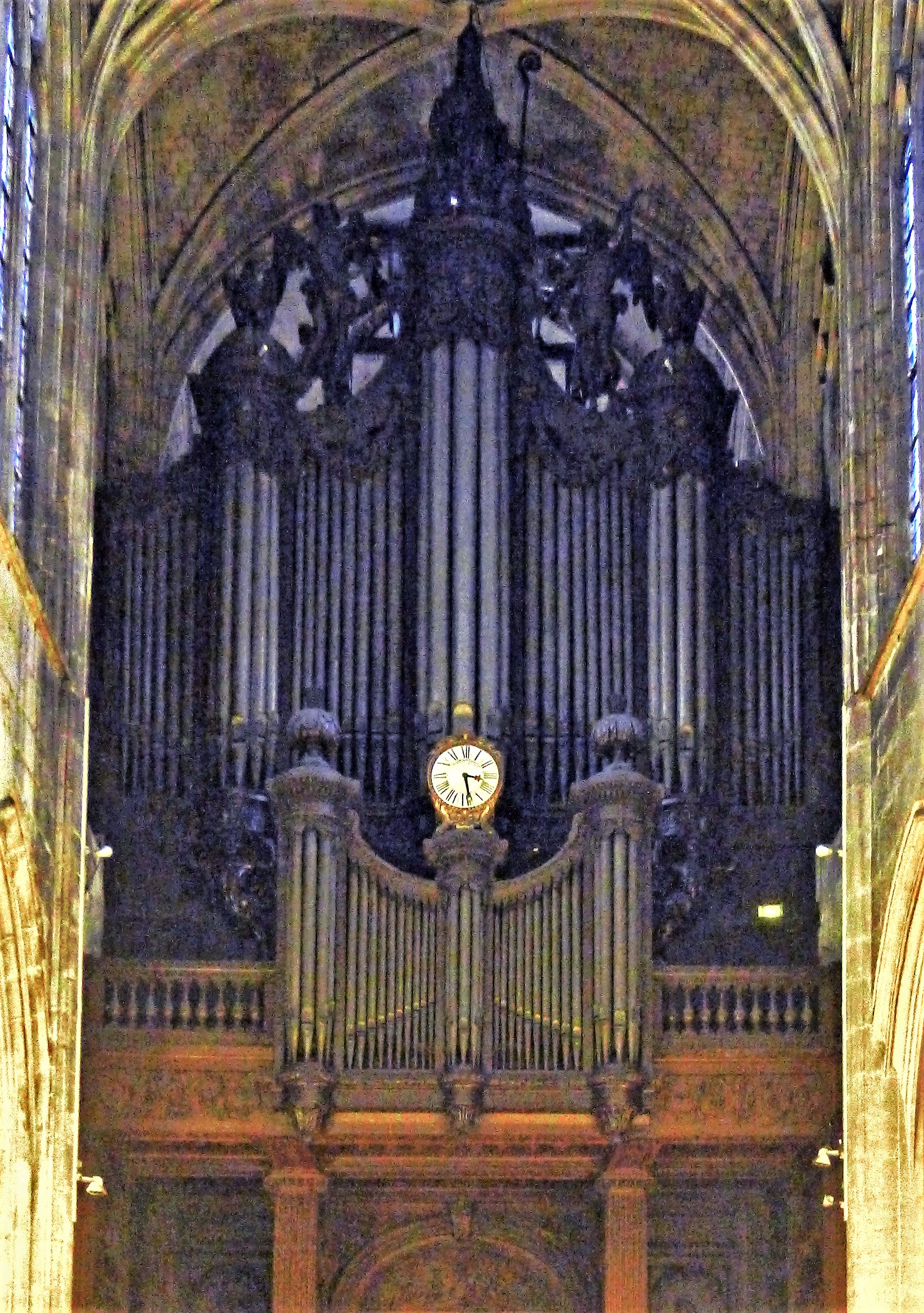
Case of the grand organ

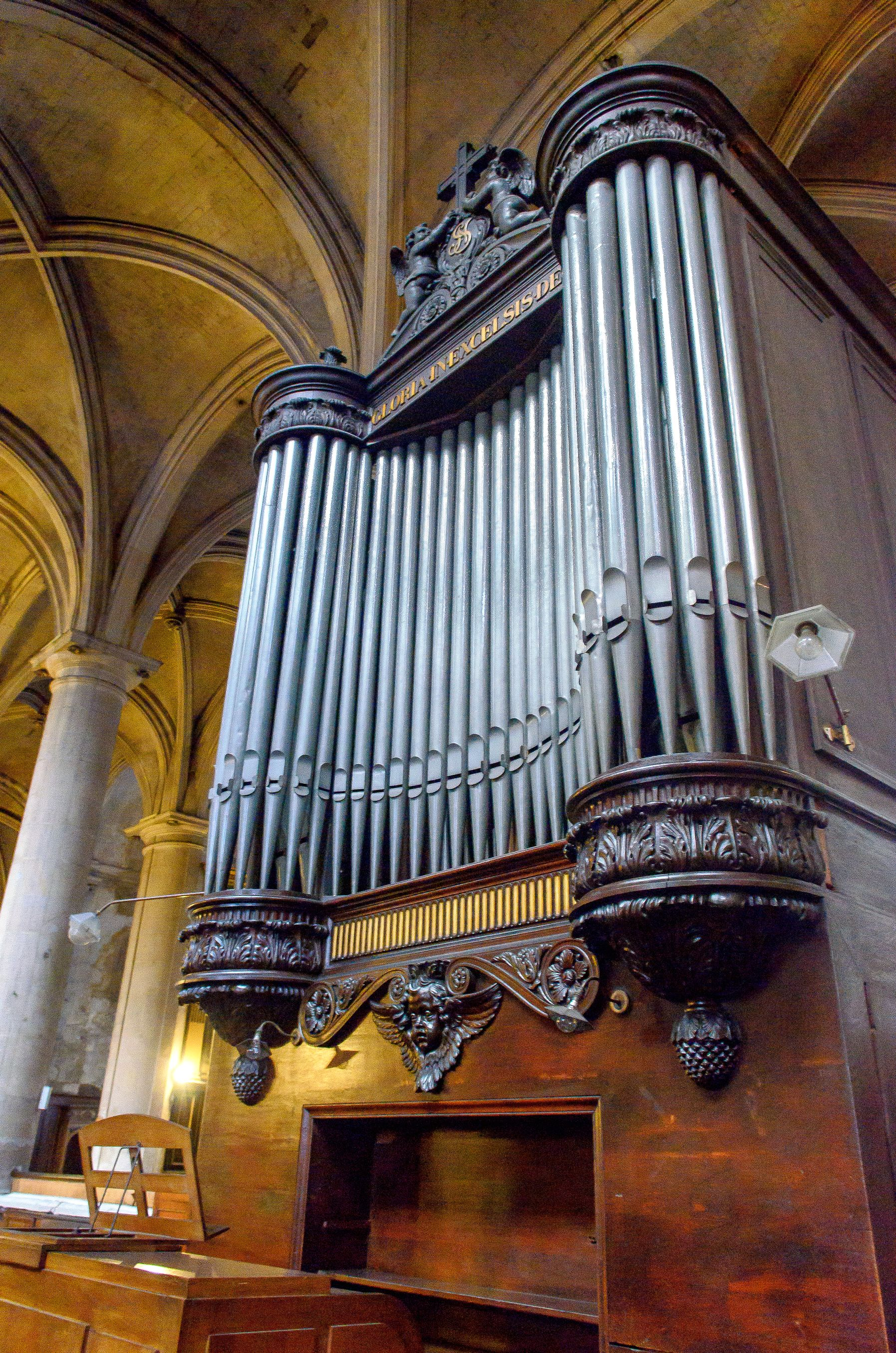
The choir organ (1845)

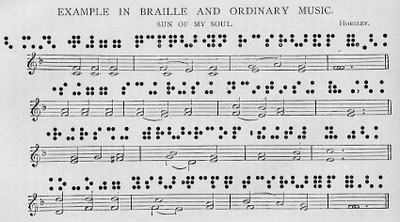
Musician notation for blind musicians developed by Louis Braille, church organist (1834–39)

The present organ is a 17th-century instrument rebuilt in 1777 by François-Henri Clicquot and further modified in 1930, when an Expression pedal was added. Among the organists who worked at the church were Nicolas Gigault (1652–1707), Etienne Richard (1651–1669), Louis Braille (1834–1839), François-Xavier Joseph Wackenthaler (1854–1855), Jean-Chrisostome Hess (1855–c.1889), and Michel Chapuis (1954–1972).

From 1834 to 1839, the organist of the church was Louis Braille, the author of the famous reading and writing system for the blind, and pioneer of a method to allow the blind or visually-impaired to read music. He was blind in both eyes. During his time at the church he revised his 1829 book, "Method of Writing Words, Music, and Plain Songs by Means of Dots, for Use by the Blind and Arranged for Them.' It was republished in 1837.

A smaller organ in the choir, housed in finely-sculpted wooden case, was installed in 1845,

To hear the main organ being played at a 1935 concert with its full range of effects (four minutes), click link below:

== Bibliography (in French) ==
- Dumoulin, Aline; Ardisson, Alexandra; Maingard, Jérôme; Antonello, Murielle; Églises de Paris (2010), Éditions Massin, Issy-Les-Moulineaux, ISBN 978-2-7072-0683-1
- Hillairet, Jacques; Connaissance du Vieux Paris; (2017); Éditions Payot-Rivages, Paris; (in French). ISBN 978-2-2289-1911-1

== (in English) ==
- Mellor, C. Michael (2006). Louis Braille: A Touch of Genius. Boston: National Braille Press. ISBN 978-0-939173-70-9.

== See also ==
- List of historic churches in Paris
- Journal d'un bourgeois de Paris
