= Saint-Joseph-des-Carmes =

Church located in Paris

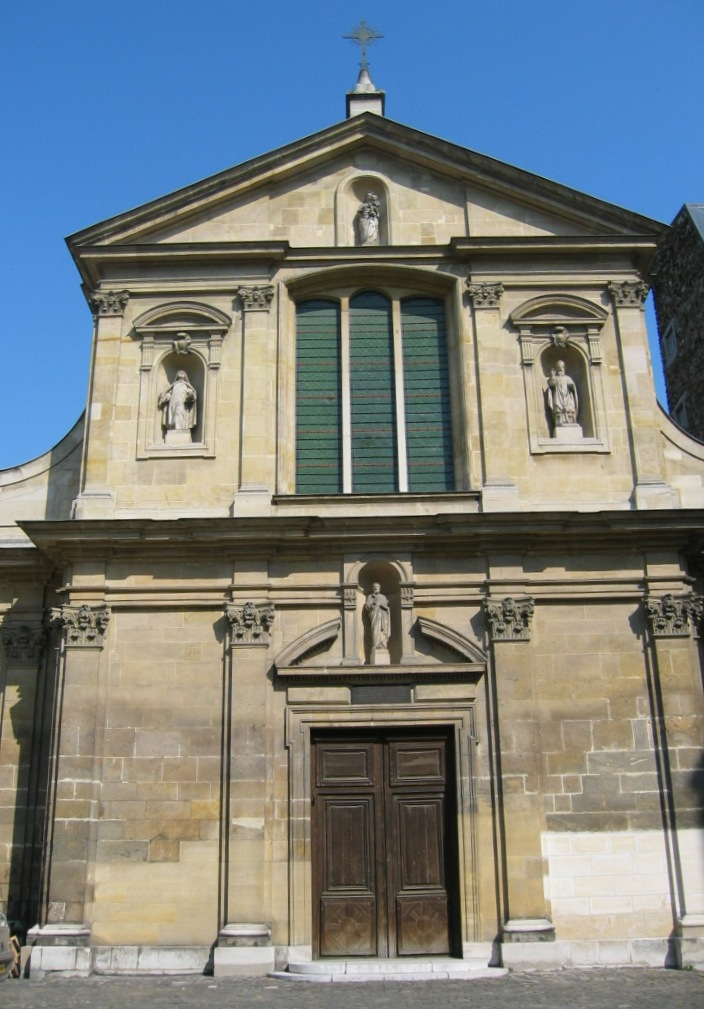
- Saint-Joseph-des-Carmes

Location
- Location: 70 rue de Vaugirard in the 6th arrondissement, Paris, France
- Interactive map of Saint-Joseph-des-Carmes
- Coordinates: 48.8485°N 2.3303°E

Architecture
- Architect: Louis Hippolyte Lebas
- Style: Neoclassical and Baroque
- Groundbreaking: 1620
- Completed: 1625

Website
- www.sjdc.fr

Saint-Joseph-des-Carmes (Saint-Joseph-des-Carmes) is a Catholic chapel located at 70 rue de Vaugirard in the 6th arrondissement of Paris. It was originally built as the chapel of a convent of the mendicant order of Discalced Carmelites. It is now the church of the Catholic Institute of Paris, a university-level seminary for training priests, and is also a parish church for the neighbourhood. It is dedicated to Saint Joseph, husband of the Virgin Mary. Built between 1613 and 1620, it combines elements of Classical architecture on the exterior with a remarkable display of Baroque architecture and art in the interior. The chapel is open to the public at limited hours.

The site was a prison of the French Revolution, formed of a vast enclosure bounded by rue du Regard, rue du Cherche-Midi and rue Cassette – it was also bordered to the south by rue de Vaugirard. It was the site of one of the September Massacres in 1792 and features in the 1927 film Napoléon. It was also the home of the famed Carmelite mystic Brother Lawrence.

== History ==
In 1610, two sisters of the Discalced Carmelites (so-called because they wore sandals as a symbol of their vow of poverty) traveled from Rome to Paris to found a convent. It was a period of great religious fervour in France; seventy-seven new churches and other religious establishments were created between 1600 and 1670 in Paris alone. In 1613, the first stone of the new church was laid by the Queen-Regent Marie de Médicis, whose residence in the Luxembourg Palace was not far away. The exterior of the church was largely completed by 1620, so decoration of the interior could begin. The first mass was celebrated in that year on 19 March, the Day of Saint Joseph. The church was consecrated on 21 December 1625 by Leonor d'Étampes de Valencay, Bishop of Chartres and close collaborator with Cardinal Richelieu. it was the first church in Paris dedicated to that saint, to whom the Carmelites, led by Teresa of Ávila, expressed a particular devotion.

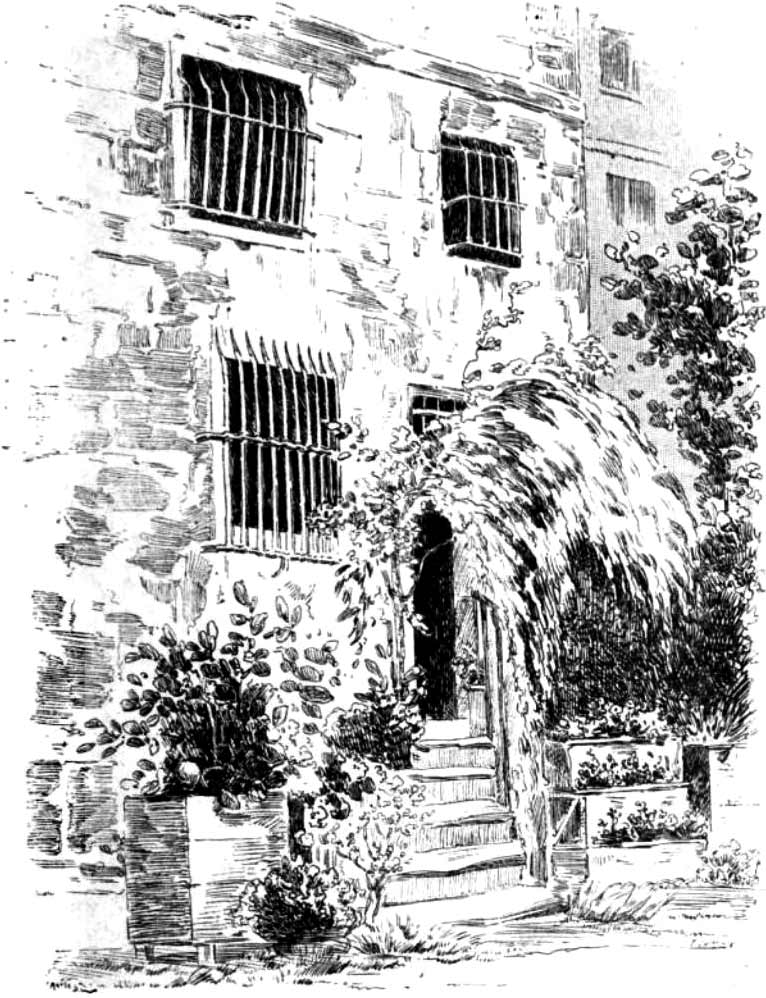
The steps of the couvent des Carmes.

At the same time that the church was constructed, the adjoining convent of the Discalced Carmelites was built. It was composed of two cloisters, a smaller cloister for those coming from outside the convent and a larger one for those resident. It contained a refractory, cells for the sisters, a capitulary hall and a hall for novices. It could house between forty and sixty novices. This structure is almost entirely intact today, and was used by the seminary.

A men's community of Carmelites was also located on the property. One famous resident was Brother Lawrence of the Resurrection, whose writings later became part of the classic Christian text, The Practice of the Presence of God. St. Jean-Baptiste de La Salle famously made a retreat at the monastery as well, having had a particular devotion to St. Teresa.

=== French Revolution – the September Massacres ===
In 1789, after the outbreak of the French Revolution, the new revolutionary National Assembly voted to nationalise the property of the church and clergy. The Civil Constitution of the Clergy was adopted on 12 July 1790, setting up a system for electing priests and bishops and imposing punishments, including a possible a death sentence, on priests who refused to swear allegiance to it. Some 126 of 130 bishops and 100,000 out of 130,000 priests refused to swear to it, and on 27 May 1792 a decree of the Legislative Assembly ordered them deported. Those who refused, called refractaires, became a target of the new government. About one thousand of them were arrested and imprisoned in several sites, including Saint-Joseph-des-Carmes.

On 2 September 1792, rumours reached Paris that a Prussian Army was approaching the city to rescue the king. The Revolutionary leader Georges Danton called on the sans culottes to put to death anyone who did not take up arms against the Prussians. The event known as the September Massacres ensued, taking the lives of some 1400 victims, including 223 priests, between 2 and 4 September. The largest number of priests, 115, were killed at Saint-Joseph-des-Carmes. Among the dead where Solomon Leclercq and Jacques Jules Bonnaud. They were given a last chance to take the oath to the government, then taken down the stairs to the garden before the crowd of Sans-Culottes, who were armed with axes, pikes and swords. Over the course of two hours, one hundred fifteen priests, a layman, and a religious were killed by the mob.

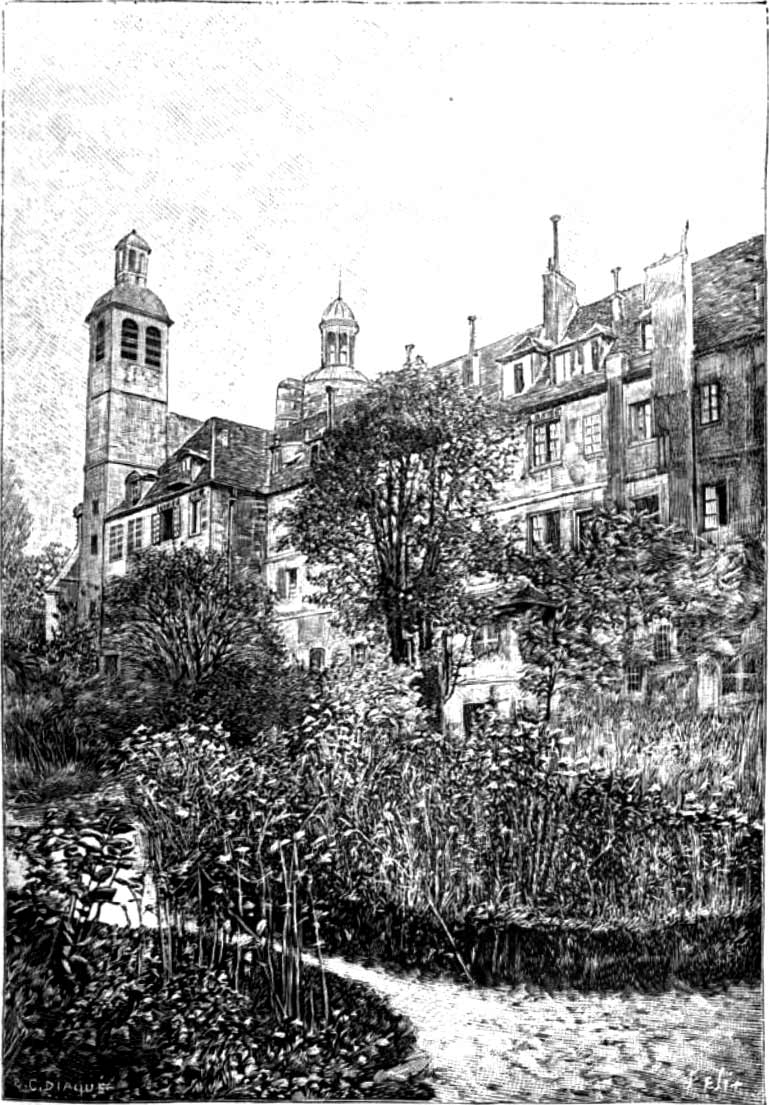
The garden of the couvent des Carmes.

Jean Marie du Lau d'Allemans (Archbishop of Arles), his vicar general Armand de Foucauld de Pontbriand, François-Joseph de La Rochefoucauld-Bayers (bishop of Beauvais) and his brother Pierre-Louis de La Rochefoucauld-Bayers (bishop of Saintes) were shut up in the monastery church and between 2 and 5 September all three of them were killed in the monastery garden along with the priests André Grasset, Ambroise Chevreux, François-Louis Hébert and Joseph-Marie Gros. The stairway is now called the Stairway of Martyrs. Those killed included the Bishops of Arles, Beauvais and Saintes, Charente-Maritime.

The monastery's household silver and library were seized and the community was forced to leave the monastery building, which was turned into a prison. 188 priests and three bishops were massacred in particularly violent conditions under commissioner Stanislas-Marie Maillard, who executed orders from the surveillance committee. At the Abbaye Prison the violence lasted until the end of the morning of 4 September, with 21 priests and 151 others killed out of a total of 29 priests and 209 other prisoners – at Carmes it only ended at 6pm, with 116 killed out of between 162 and 172 prisoners. All the monks who refused to take the oath before the tribunal at the prison were bayoneted or impaled on pikes on the threshold. The massacre at Carmes lasted all night.

The church continued to serve as a prison (Carmes Prison; French - prison des Carmes) until the end of the Revolution, and was the scene of a second massacre. On July 23, 1794, a group of forty-nine aristocrats, accused of conspiracy, were executed. They included the Count of Soyecourt, and Alexandre de Beauharnais, the first husband of Empress Joséphine, Josephine herself was also held prisoner there, but survived to become the wife of Napoleon Bonaparte,

In 1797 a Carmelite supporter, Madamoiselle de Soyecourt, bought the abandoned church and cloister and made it the home of a community of Carmelite sisters. One of the cells from this period has been preserved and can be visited.

=== Later years ===
In 1841 the buildings were purchased by the Archbishop of Paris for use as a higher school of ecclesiastical studies. In 1845 the Carmelite sisters departed, In 1851 the church took on the function of a parish church. In 1867 the Dominican monks also departed. In 1875 it became the home of the Catholic University of Paris, which was in 1880 was renamed formally the Catholic Institute of Paris. The church is now used by the Seminary, but is also a parish church for the neighbourhood.

In 1867, during the construction of Rue de Rennes, the graves of the priests massacred at the church in 1792 were discovered. The remains were transferred to the church and placed in Crypt of Martyrs, which was dedicated in 1868.

The land occupied by the church and Institute today is less than half of the original land of convent and church. It was reduced by the construction of a new street, rue d'Assas, in 1798, and by a new boulevard built by Napoleon III, the Rue de Rennes, in 1866. In the 18th century, the Carmelites found a new source of income in building private houses for rental along Rue du Regard. Some of these houses, at 1,5 and 13 rue du Regard, still exist.

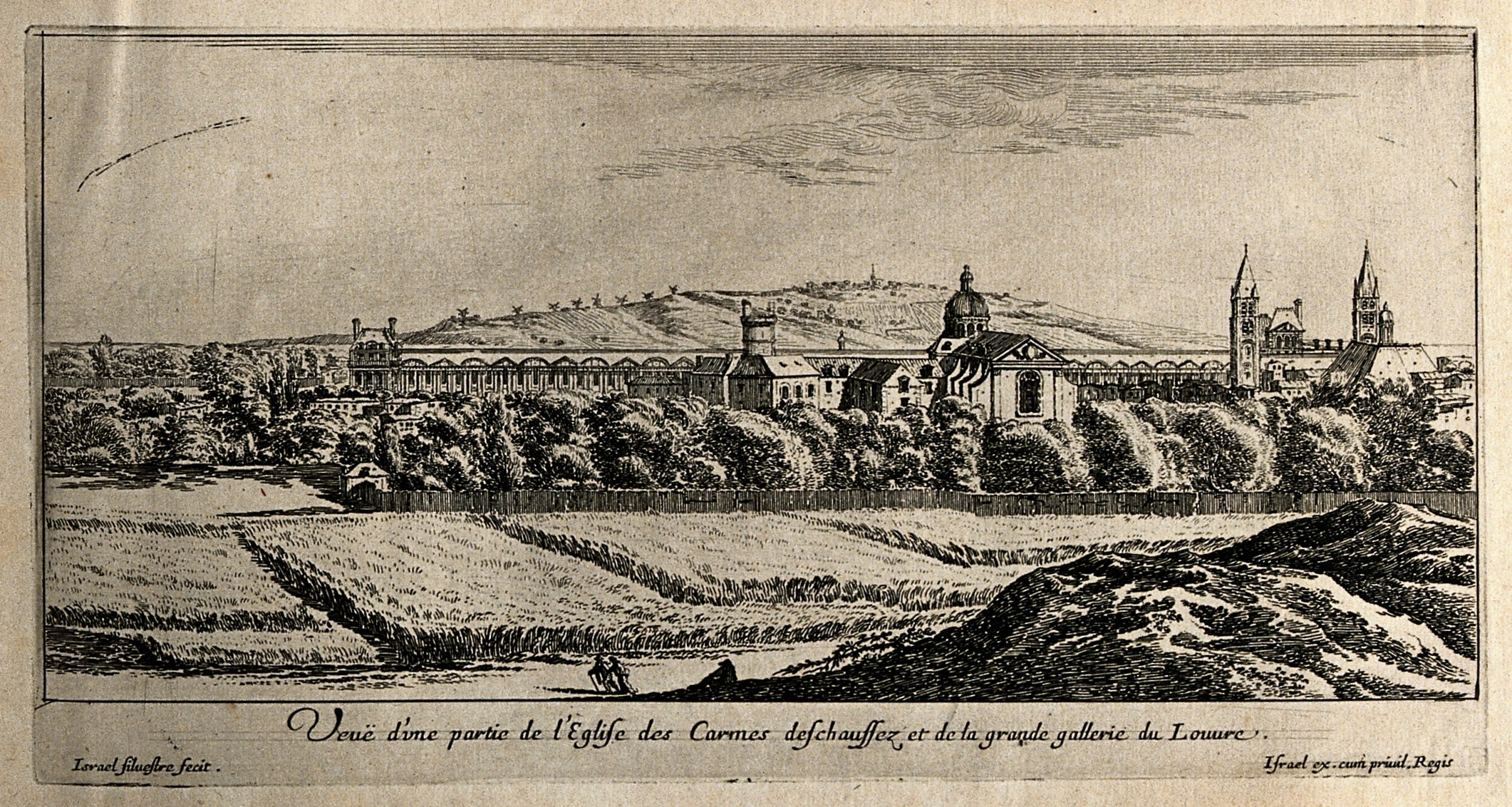
The Convent and church in the 1670s, with Louvre in background

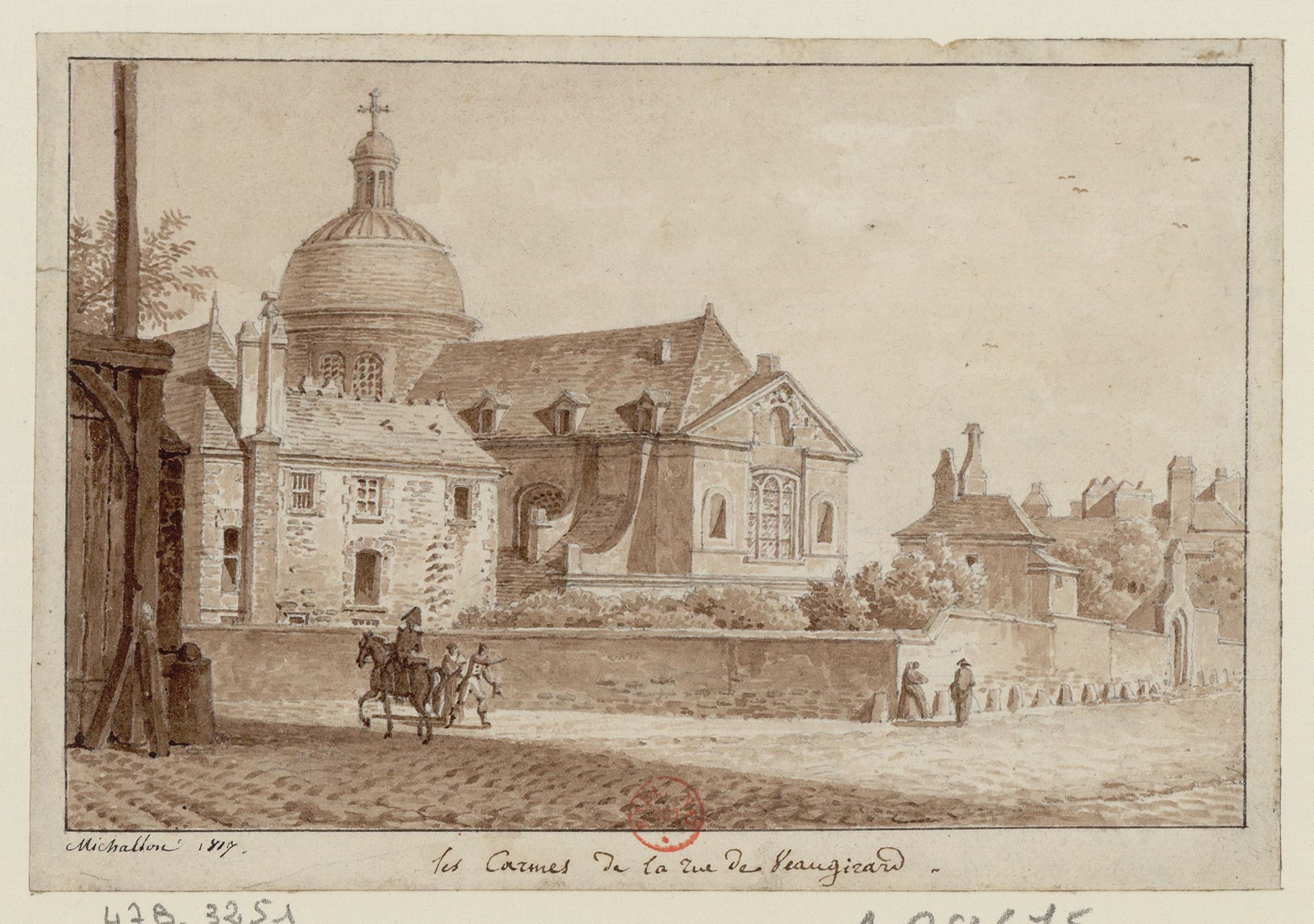
The chapel in 1817

== Exterior ==
=== Facade ===
The exterior of the church was influenced by classical architecture and particularly the Italian Baroque style, as first seen at Santa Maria Novella church in Florence in 1470, then widely copied in Rome in other cities in the late 16th century. It uses the elements of ancient Roman architecture; with three levels diminishing in size going upwards, and is and crowned by a classical triangular fronton, with a statue of the Virgin Mary, the patron saint of the Carmelites. The facade is decorated with pilasters, or simulated columns with Doric capitals appearing to be part of the structure.

The facade was considerably reworked in the 1870s by architects Louis and Lucienne Dovillard. The surviving elements of the 17th century facade are the Doric pilasters and an entablement with triglyphs and metopes.

=== Dome ===
The dome was a great novelty in Paris at the time it was built; it was only the second to be built in Paris, after the dome of the convent of the Petits-Augustins; (that dome is now found at the Ecole des Beaux Arts nearby). It was designed by Louis et Lucien Dovillard. It was soon imitated by other Paris domes; at the Sorbonne (1634), Saint-Paul-Saint-Louis (1630), Val-de-Grâce (church) (1660), and the Invalides (1694).

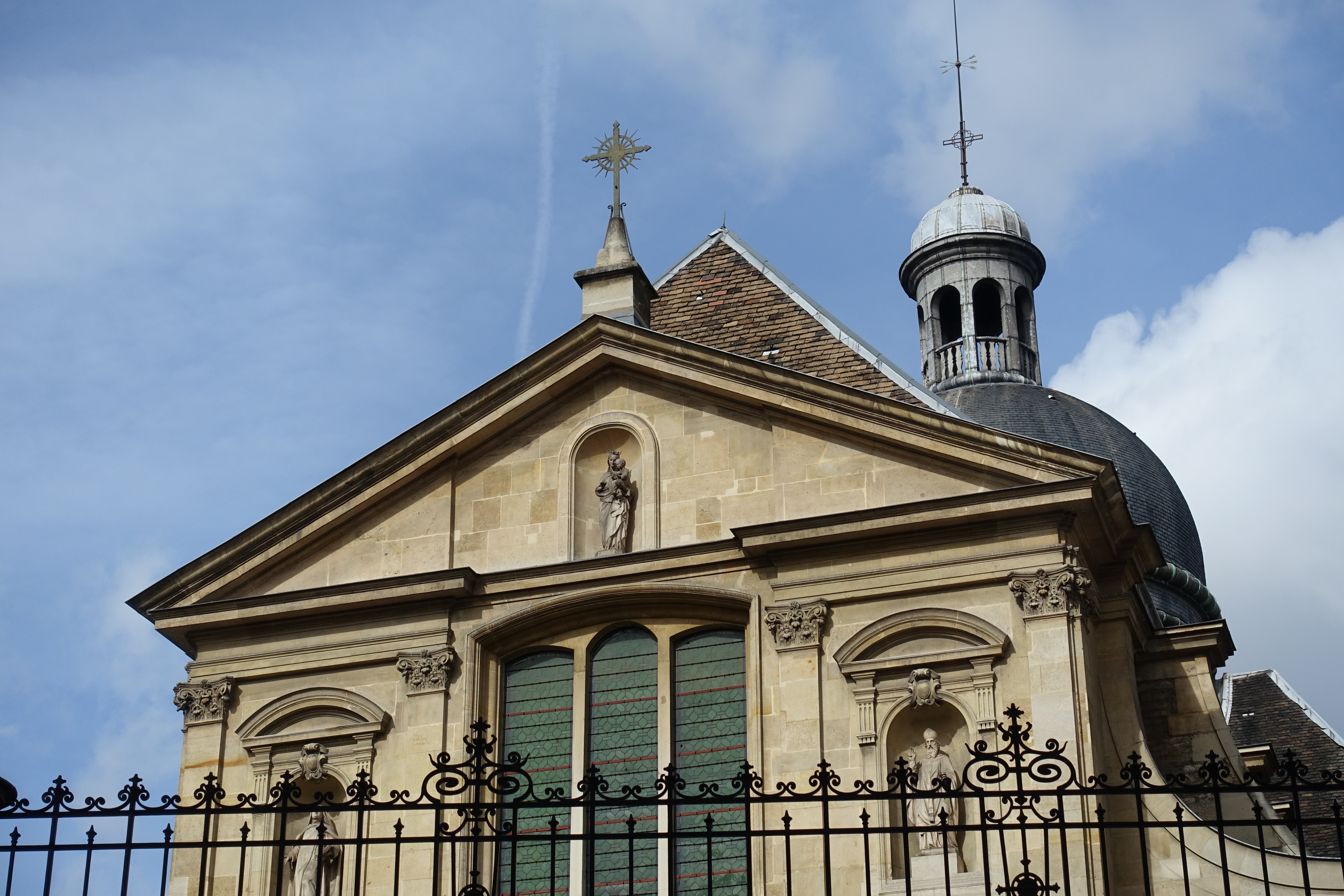
Facade and the dome, the second in Paris

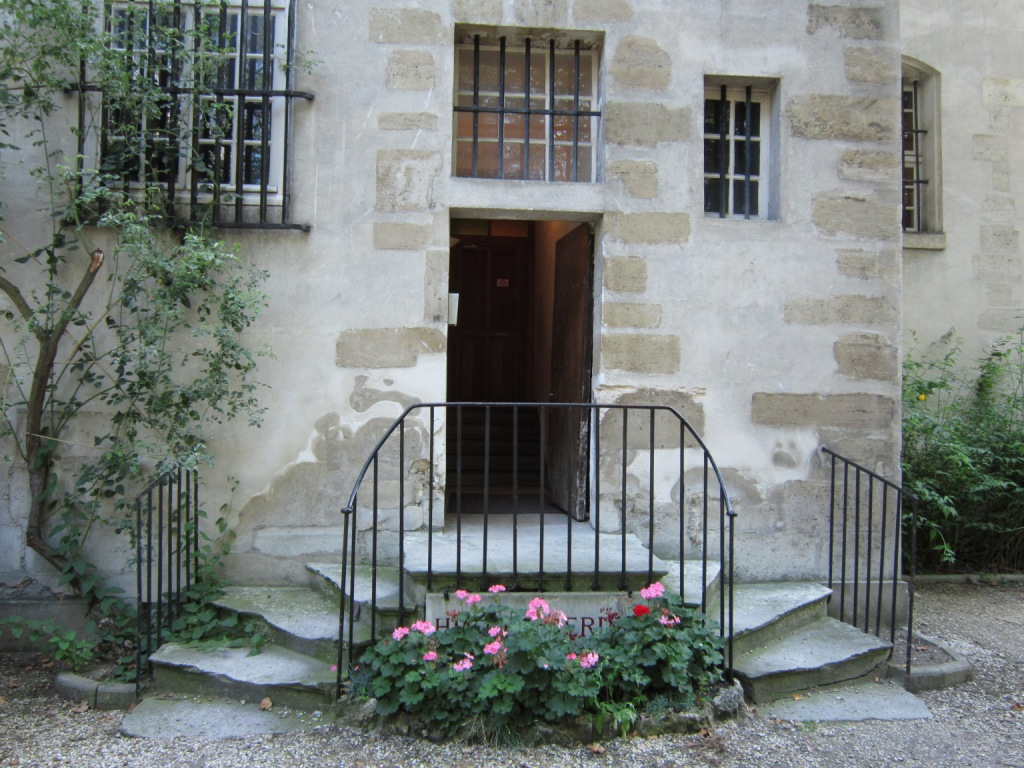
Stairway of Martyrs, scene of the September Massacres on Sept. 2, 1792. Inscription on steps reads in Latin, "Hic ceciderund" ("Here they fell.").

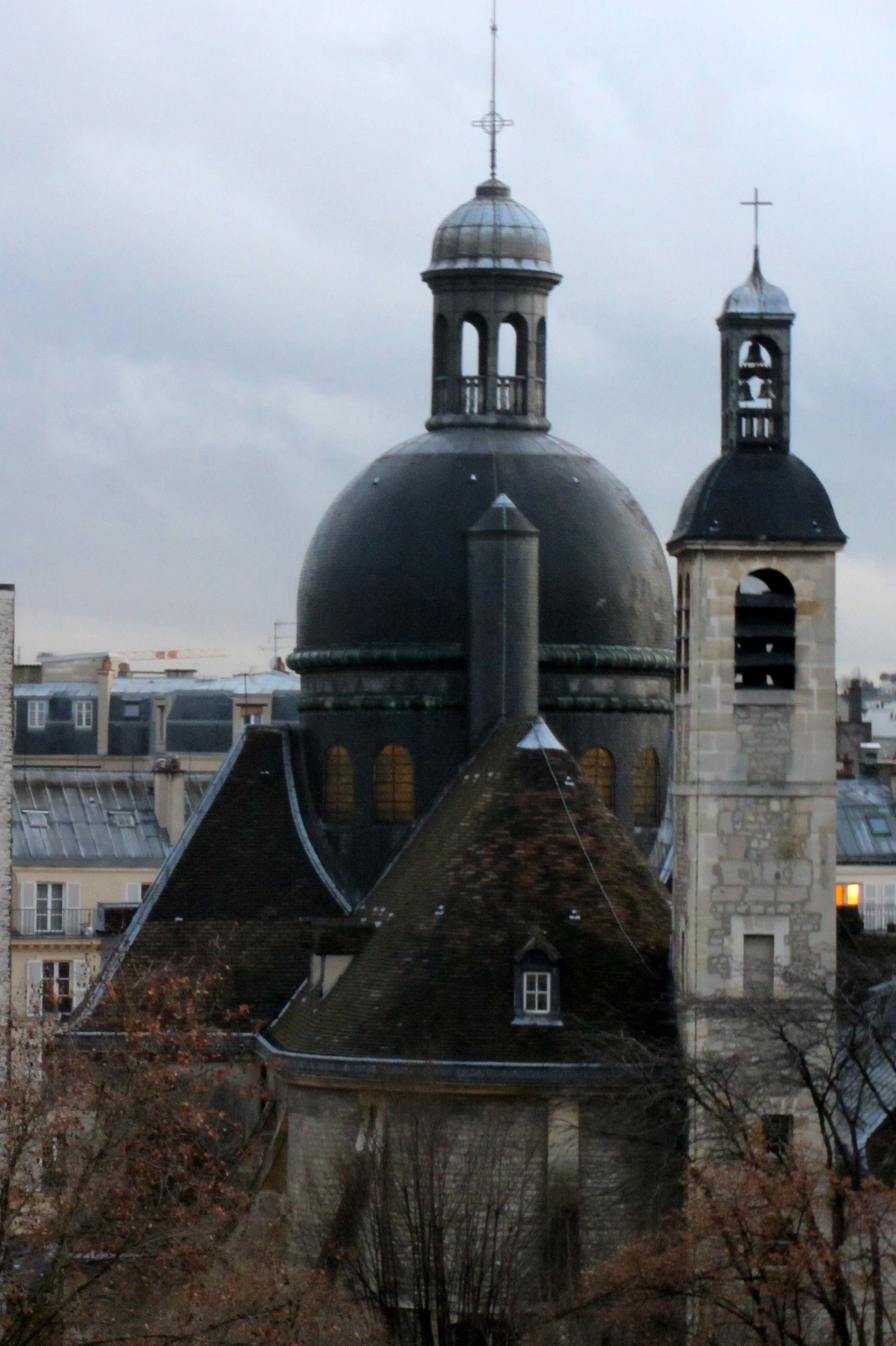
The dome, the second in Paris, and the campanile

== Interior ==
While the exterior of the church is rather formal and austere, the interior is very Baroque, full of color, illusionist effects and a sense of movement given by the architecture and the art. The nave is covered with rounded vaults, and is lined with Doric columns and pilasters, painted to resemble marble. Rounded arches, ghly decorated, separate the nave from the chapels oon either side, and from the apse. The apse, formerly the choir where the sisters of the order took their place, is now largely hidden by the altar.

The interior shows the influence of the Council of Trent, a Papal doctrine which called for churches to be more decorated and more designed to appeal to lay churchgoers. The stalls of the choir where the clergy was seated, were moved behind the altar, almost out of sight, so that the ordinary parishioners would be closer to the altar, and would have a greater sense of participation.

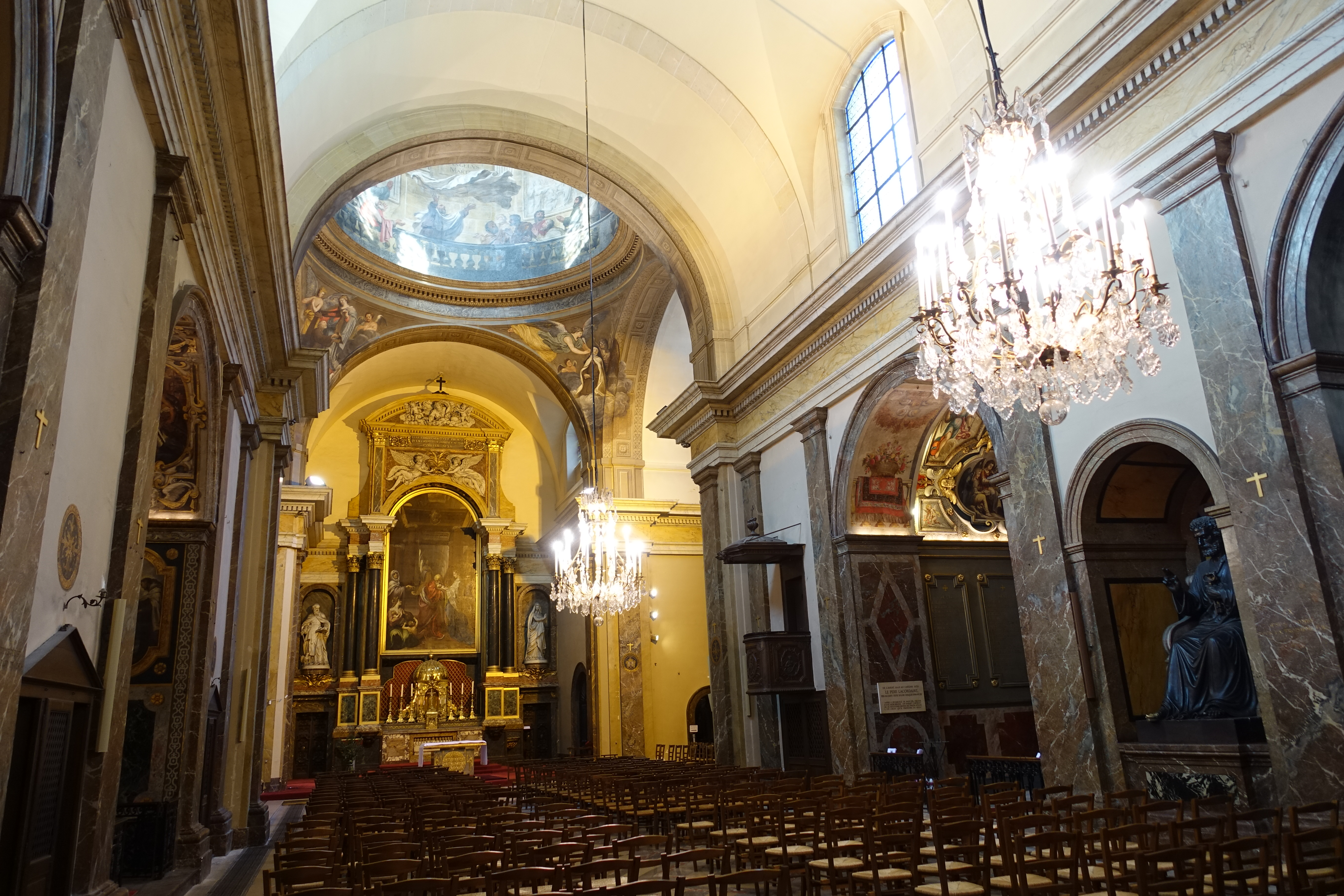
The nave and the choir, with side chapels

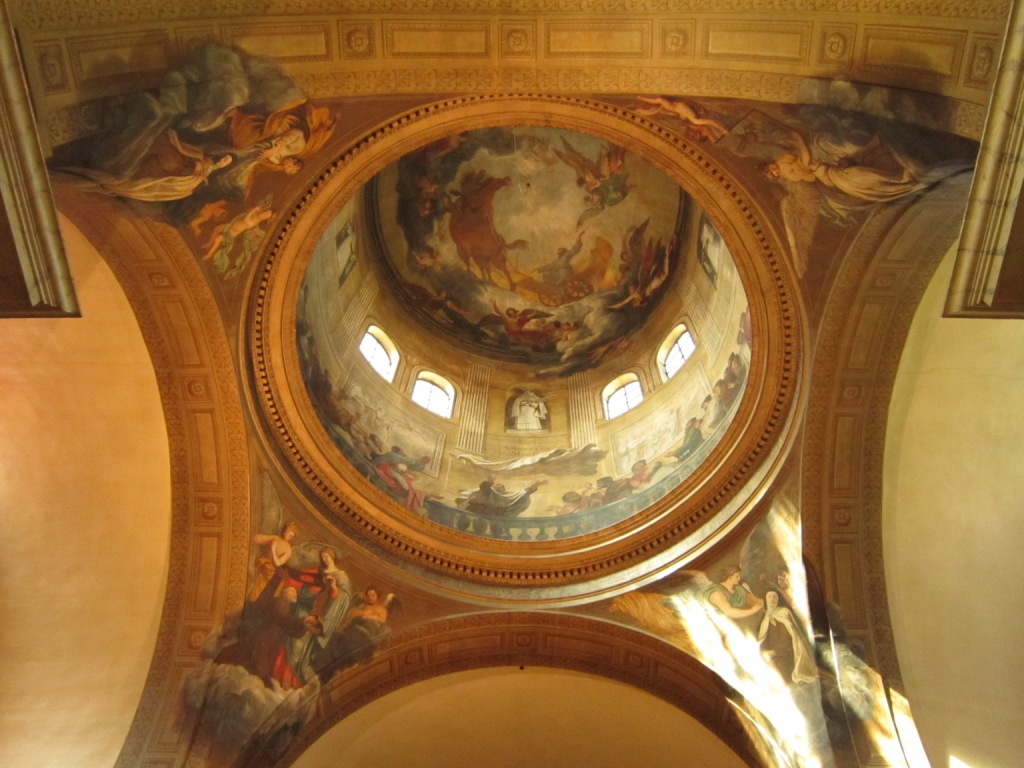
The dome over the transept

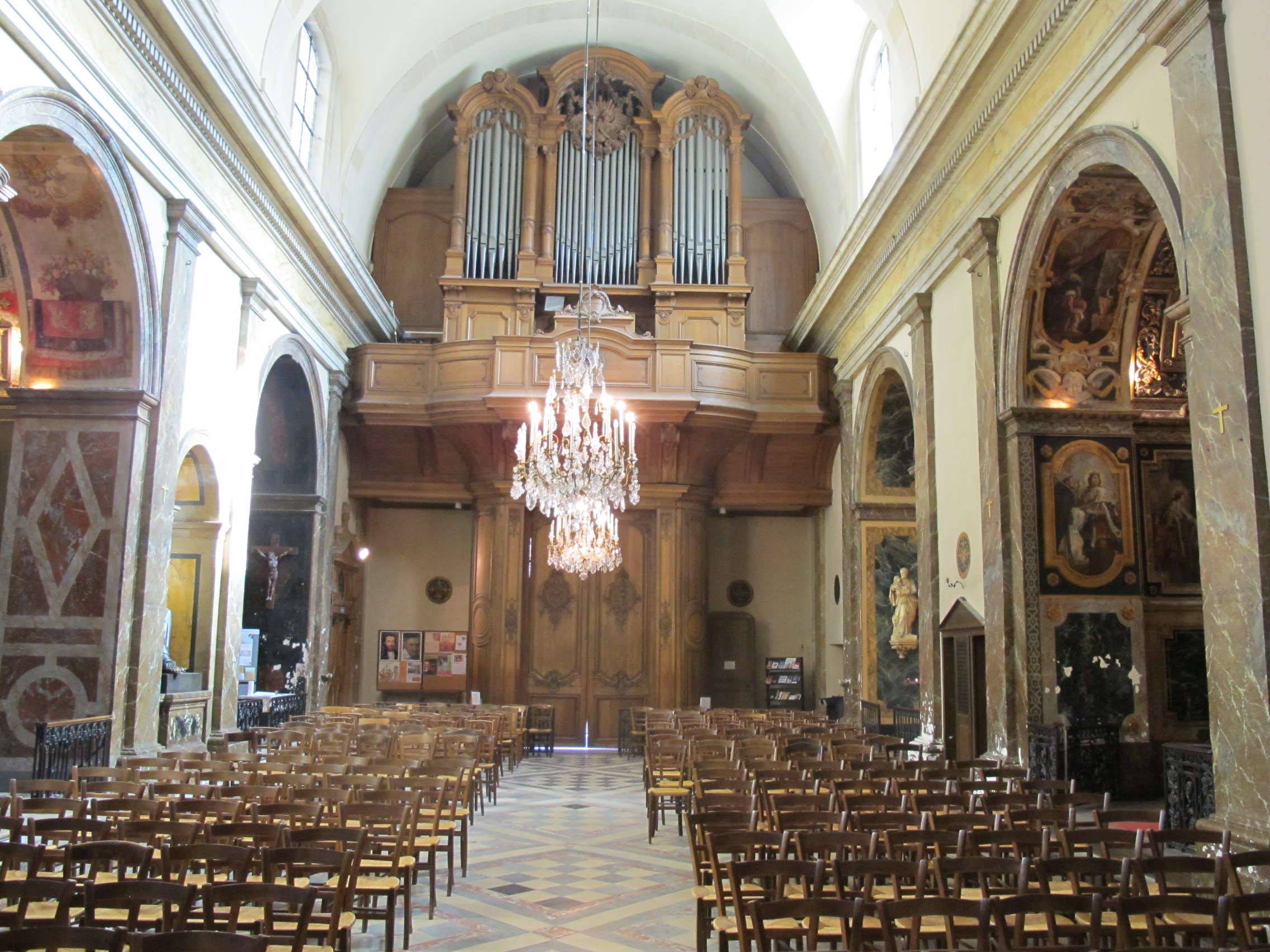
The nave and tribune with the grand organ

== The Cupola interior ==
The cupola or dome ia one of the distinctly Italian features featured in the church. It is 9.4 meters in diameter, and is placed over the crossing of the transept. It was the first dome in Paris to rest upon a drum, a cylinder of stone with a circle of windows that light the church below. It is built of wood covered with a plaster, with a framework of wood above which supports the tiles of the roof and a lantern like a crown on the top.

The interior of the cupola feature a painting of Elijah riding a chariot of fire to heaven, surrounded by angels. It painted in 1644 by Walter Damery, a painter of Liège, assisted by Bertholet Flémal. The two painters had studied together in the atelier of Peter Paul Rubens in Antwerp, and in Italy. This was the first painted cupola in Paris.

Elijah was chosen as the main figure because he was highly admired by the Carmelites. In the painting, he is wearing a costume of the Carmelites (a white cape and brown hood.

The paintings in the upper part of the dome present scenes of Elijah in the heavenly world, while those of the lower portions depict scenes in his terrestrial life.

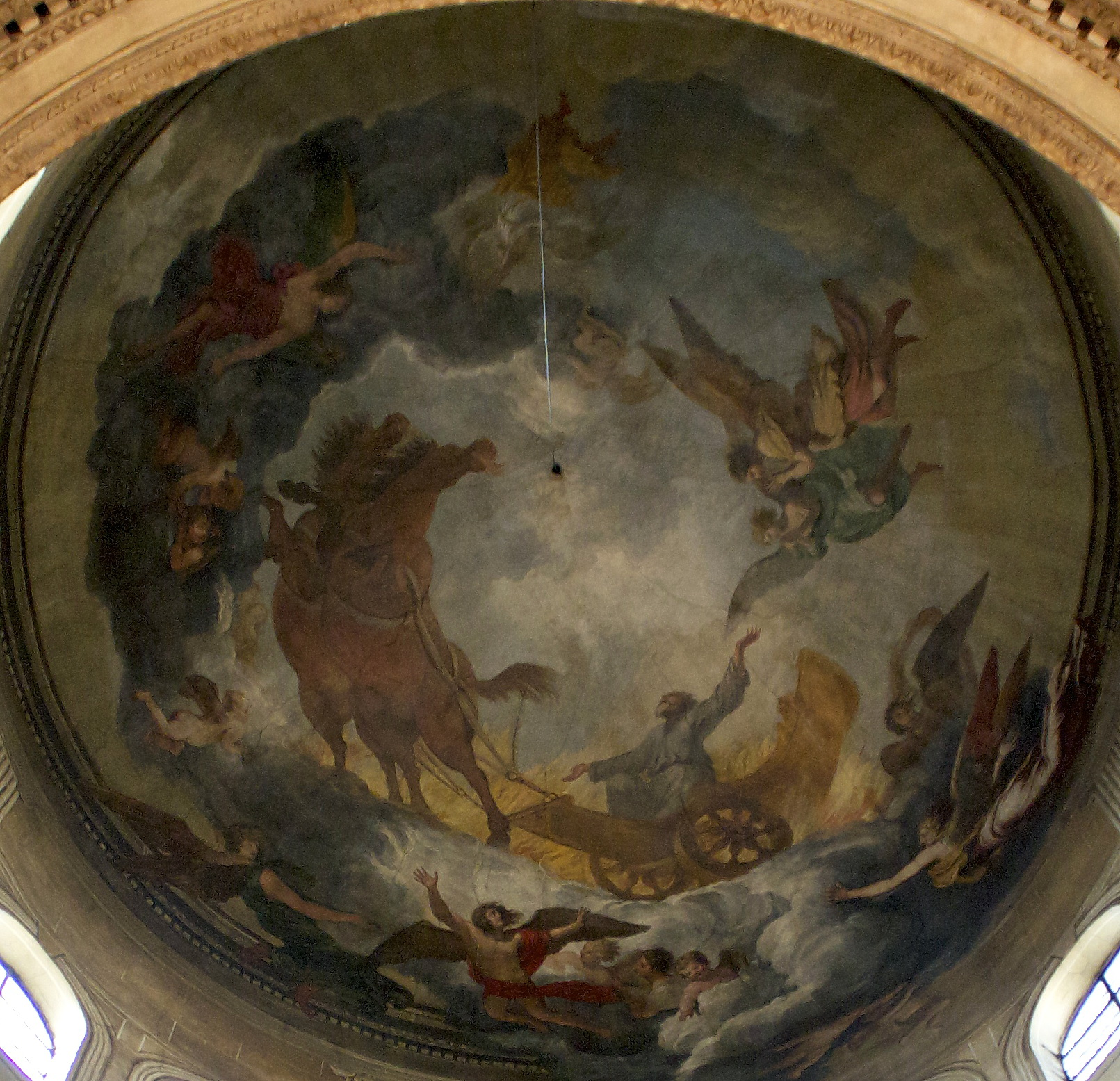
Upper cupola; Prophet Elijah being transported to heaven in a chariot of fire

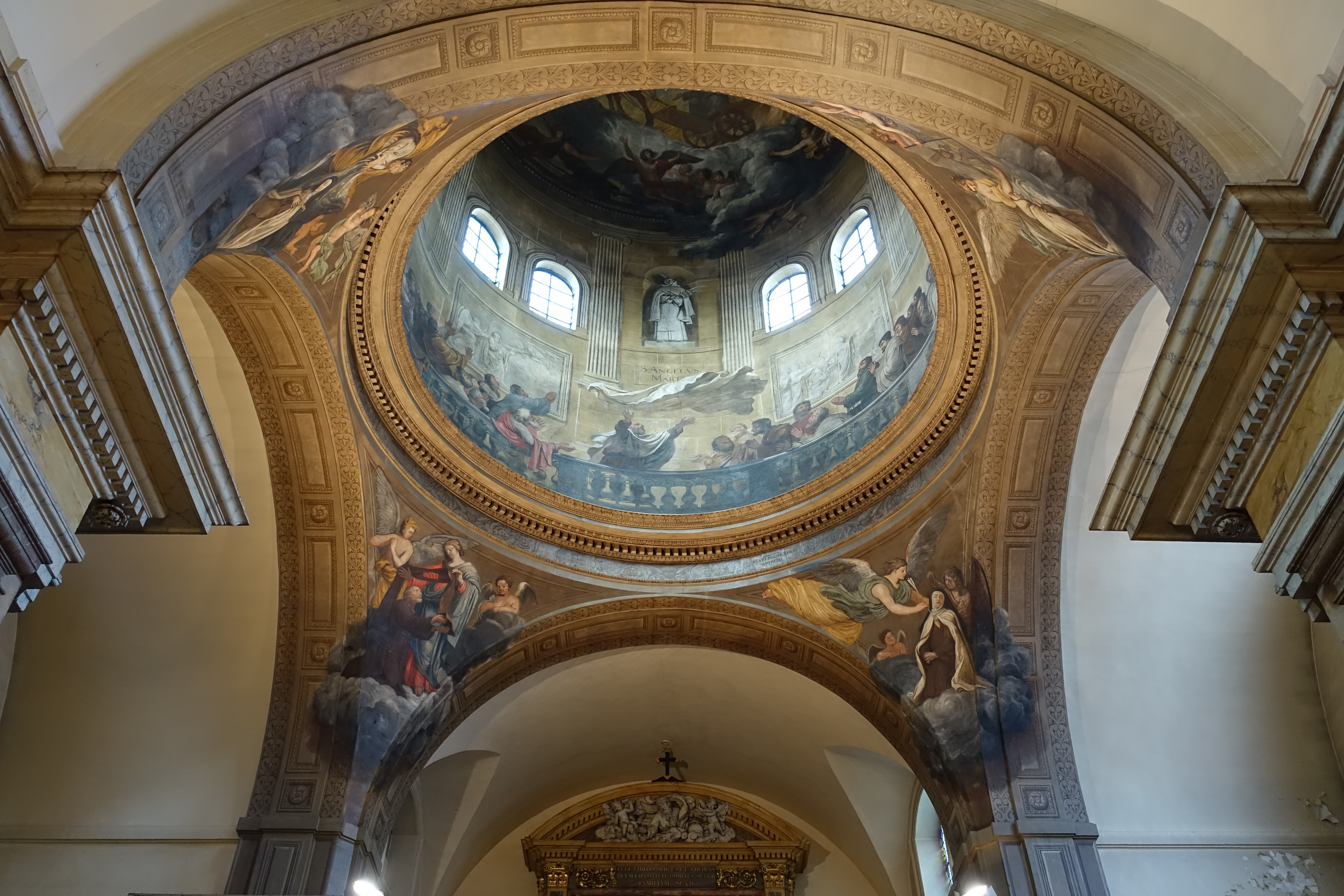
Lower cupola; scenes of earthly life of Elijah

== Retable and Altar ==
The high altar was ordered by Chancellor Pierre Séguier in 1633. The carvings were the work of Simon Guillain and François Anguier. The altarpiece was given to the convent of the Discalced Carmelites by Queen Anne of Austria in 1624; it was painted by Quentin Varin and depicts the Presentation of Christ in the Temple.

The altar It is directly below the dome, and had the function of separating the choir behind the altar, where the clergy are seated, from the nave, where the parishioners worship. It features four columns of black marble, with a statue of the Prophet Elijah by Simon Guilan on the left. The original statue to the right was of Saint Therese of Avila, but it was replaced by a statue of an unnamed saint in the 19th century.

The retable of the main altar displays one of the major works of art in the church, "The Presentation of Jesus in the Temple", painted by Quentin Varin (1570-1634). It is in the school of Mannerism, and is dated 1624. It was given to the church b Above the retable and painting are group of sculpted angels. The altar displays a very ornate Neo-Baroque tabernacle, made in the 19th century, which replaced the original 17th century work created by Pierre Mignard.

On the front of the main altar is a remarkable bas-relief of the Last Supper from the 14th century, vividly depicting the faces of Christ and the Apostles. It is attributed to Evrard d'Orleans (1292-1357).It originally belonged to the Abbey of Maubuisson, but was moved to Paris after the French Revolution.

In front of the main altar is a smaller modern altar of marble and gilding, made in 1991 by sculptor Philippe Kaeppelin. It illustrates his vision of a modern Apocalypse, "The Martyrs of the Grand Test", a reference to the priests killed at the church for their beliefs during the French Revolution.

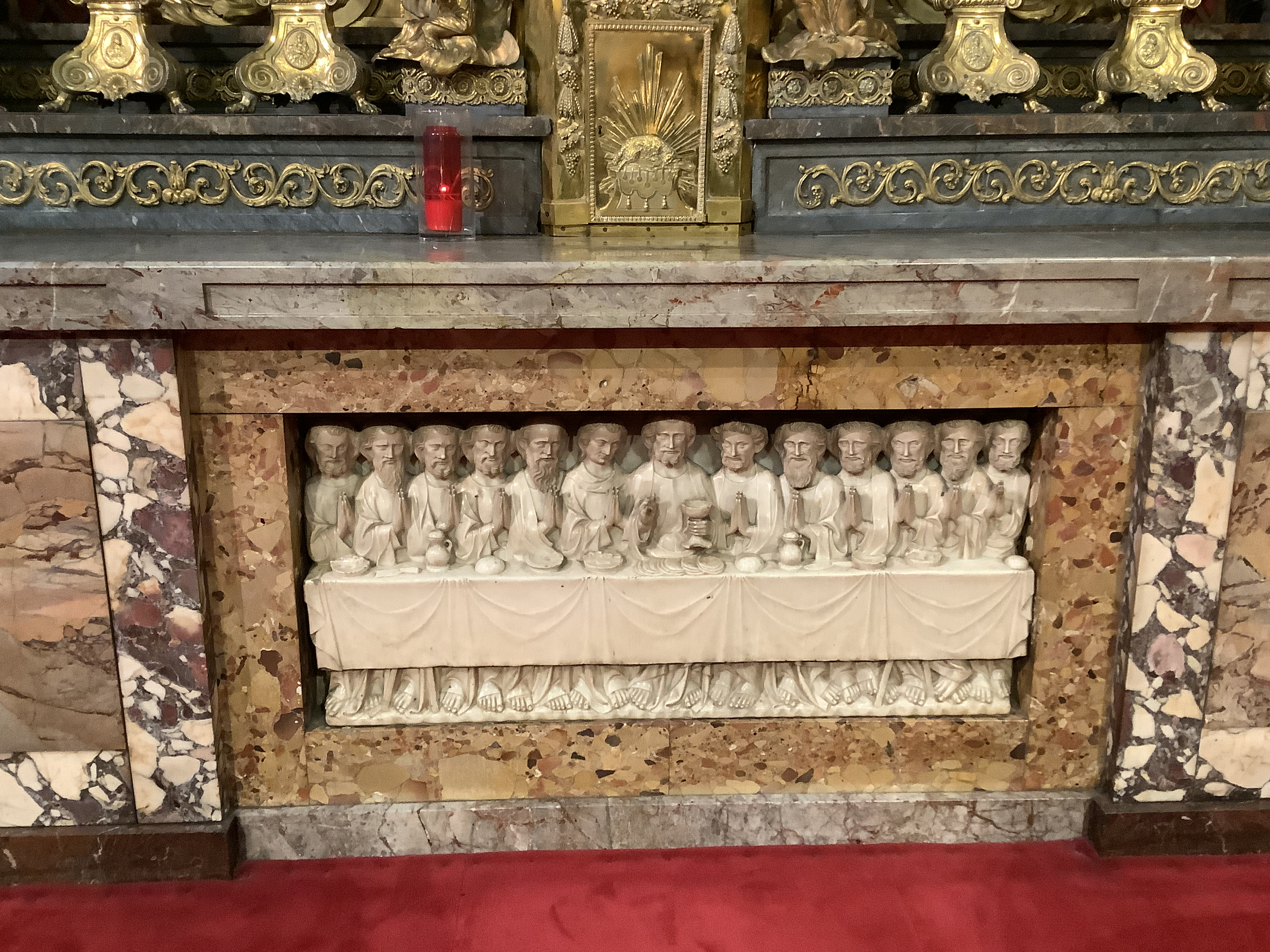
Marble depiction of "the Last Supper" (14th century)

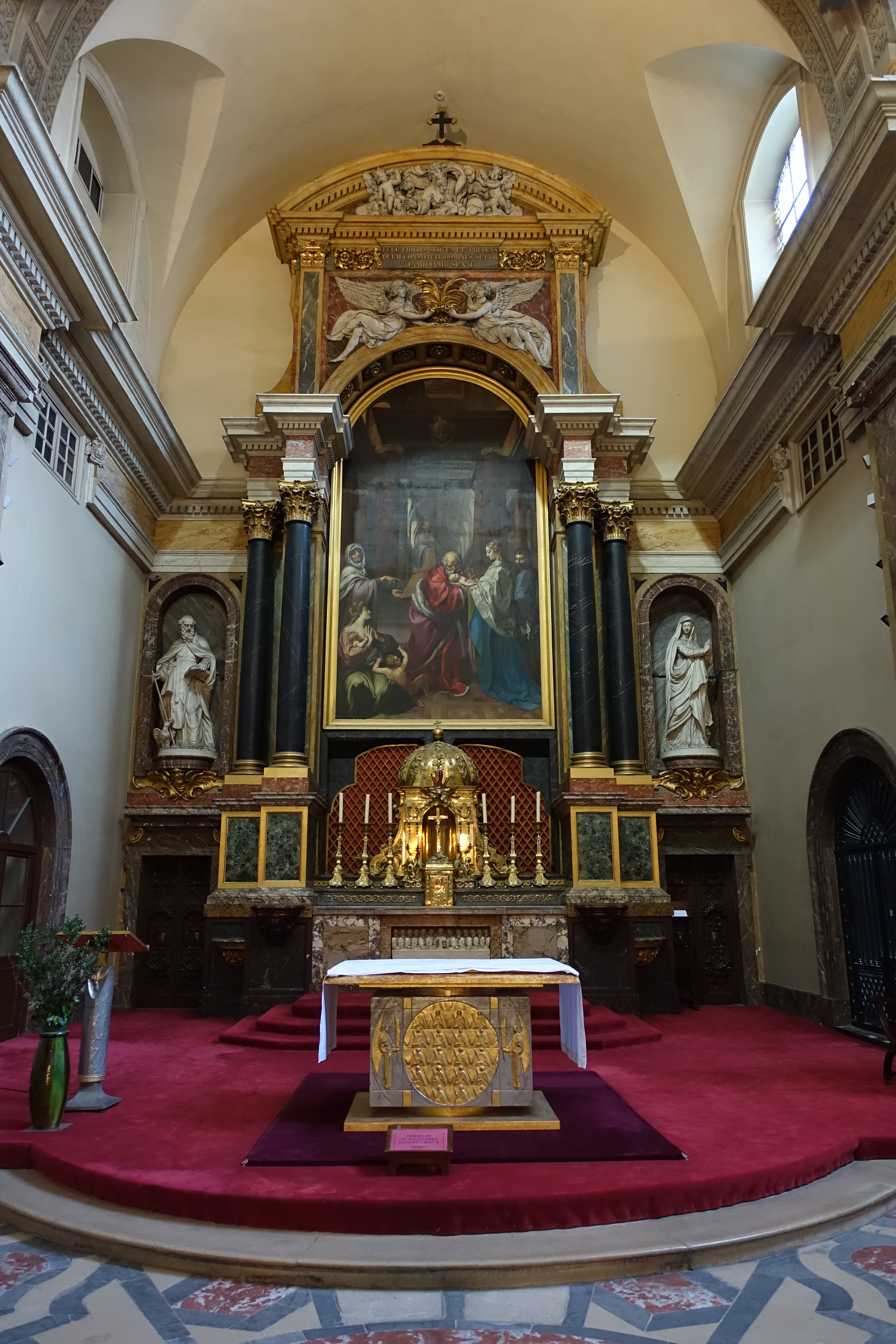
The altar and retable

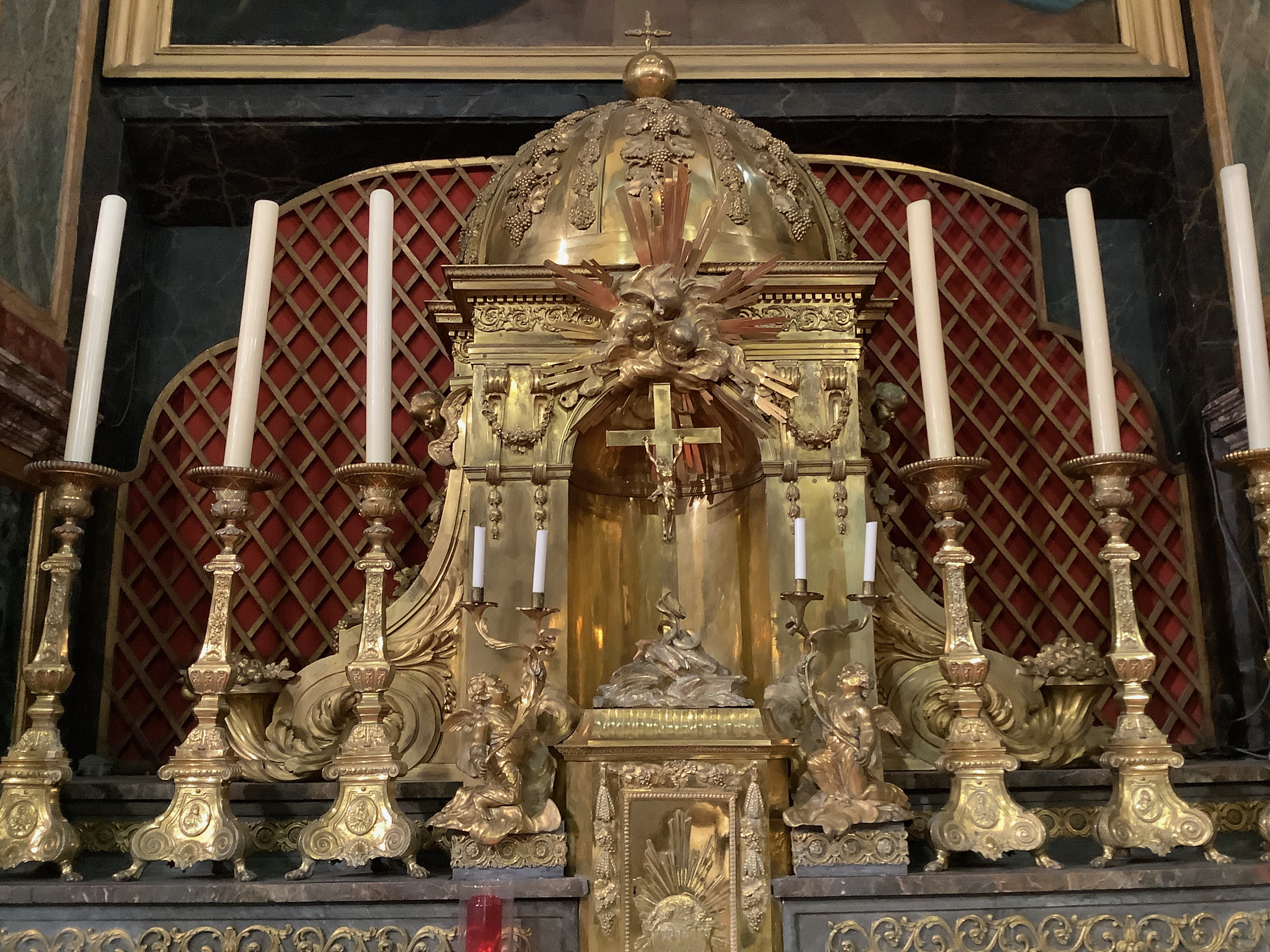
Neo-Baroque tabernacle of the main altar

== The Chapels ==
The Chapel of Saint Anne, begun in 1620, was the first of the chapels to be completed, and has a dense and colorful arrangement of interlocking Baroque paintings, gilding, and sculpture. It was built under the patronage of Pierre Brûlard de Sillery, a wealthy nobleman who was Minister of War and Foreign Affairs of King Louis XIII. The art recounts events in the life of the Virgin Mary, and her connection with her mother, Saint Anne. The central painting over the altar, attributed to Michel Corneille, depicts "The Education of the Virgin surrounded by her parents, Anne and Joachim." The paintings are good examples of the style called Mannerism popular in the period.

The walls of the chapel are covered with a cycle of paintings in very elaborate settings illustrating scenes from the life of the Virgin Mary, surrounded by painted angels, grotesques and flowers, in the French style of the early 17th century. Over the entry is a painting of the Annunciation, while the ceiling is occupied by paintings of the Four Evangelists, surrounding a painting of the Virgin, who in turn is surrounded by angels. The chapel was entirely restored in 2012 by the City of Paris, funded by private donations.

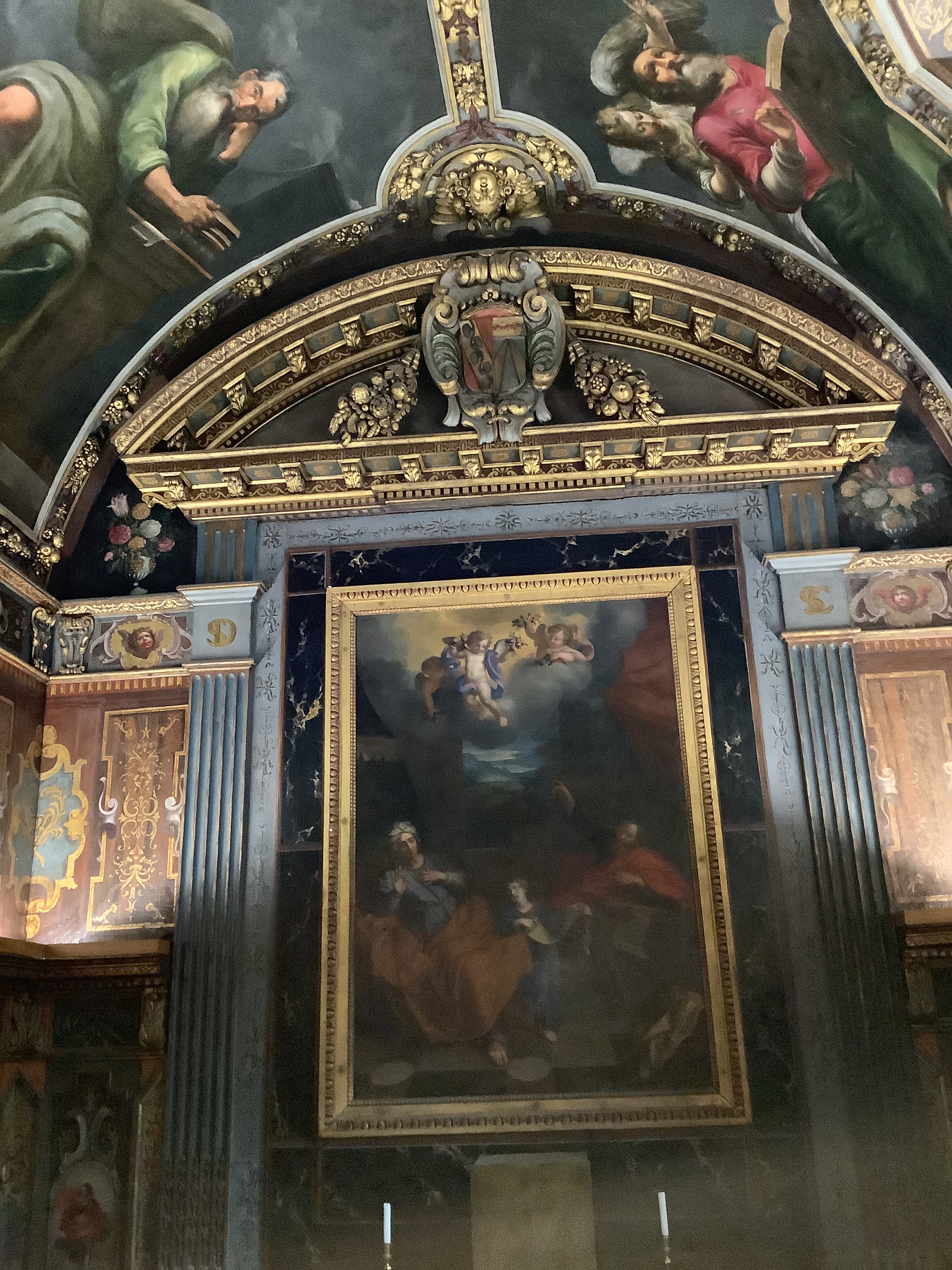
"Education of the Virgin Mary by her parents, Saint Anne and Saint Joachim" (Chapel of Saint Anne)

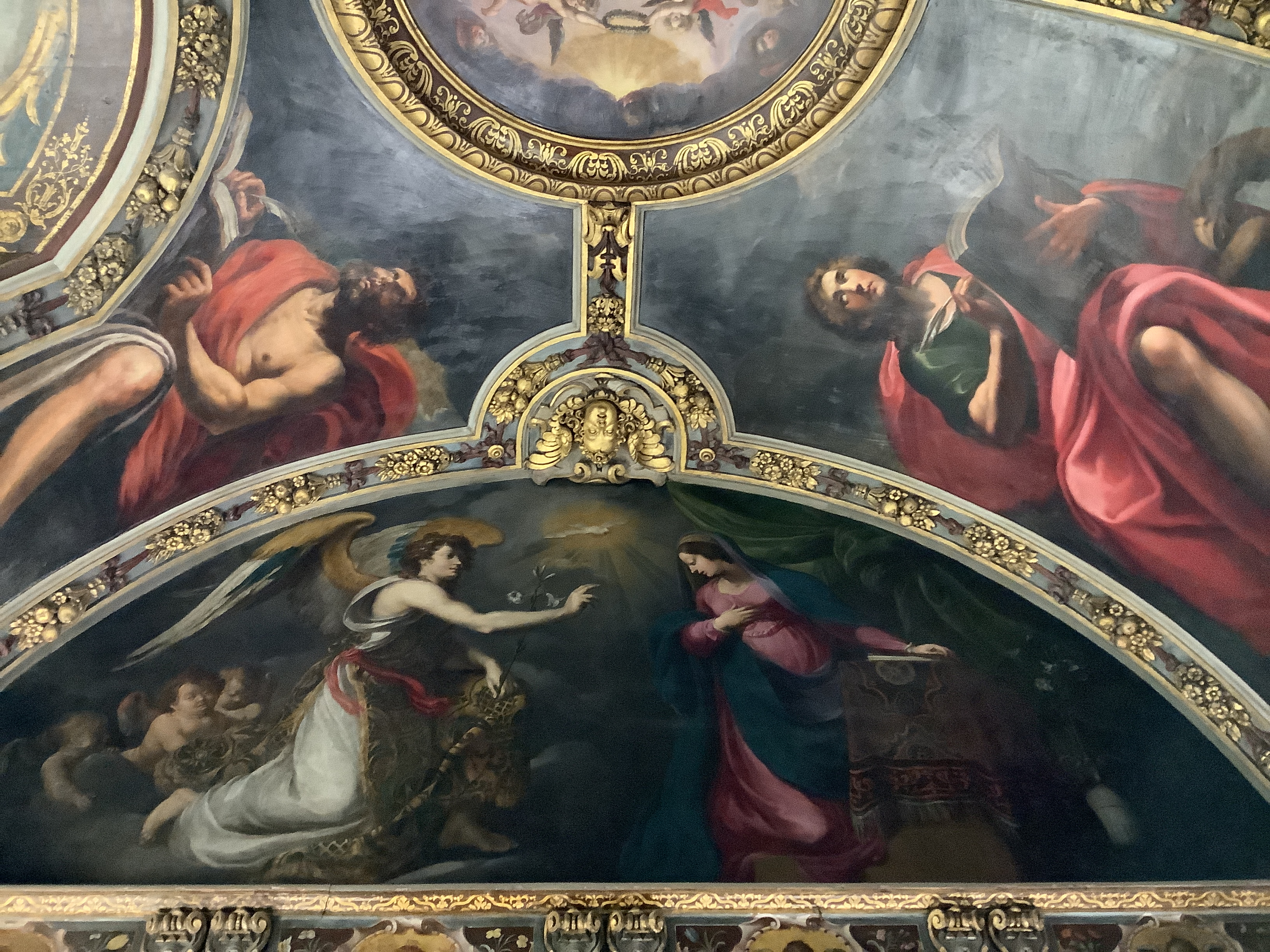
"The Annunciation", Chapel of Saint Anne

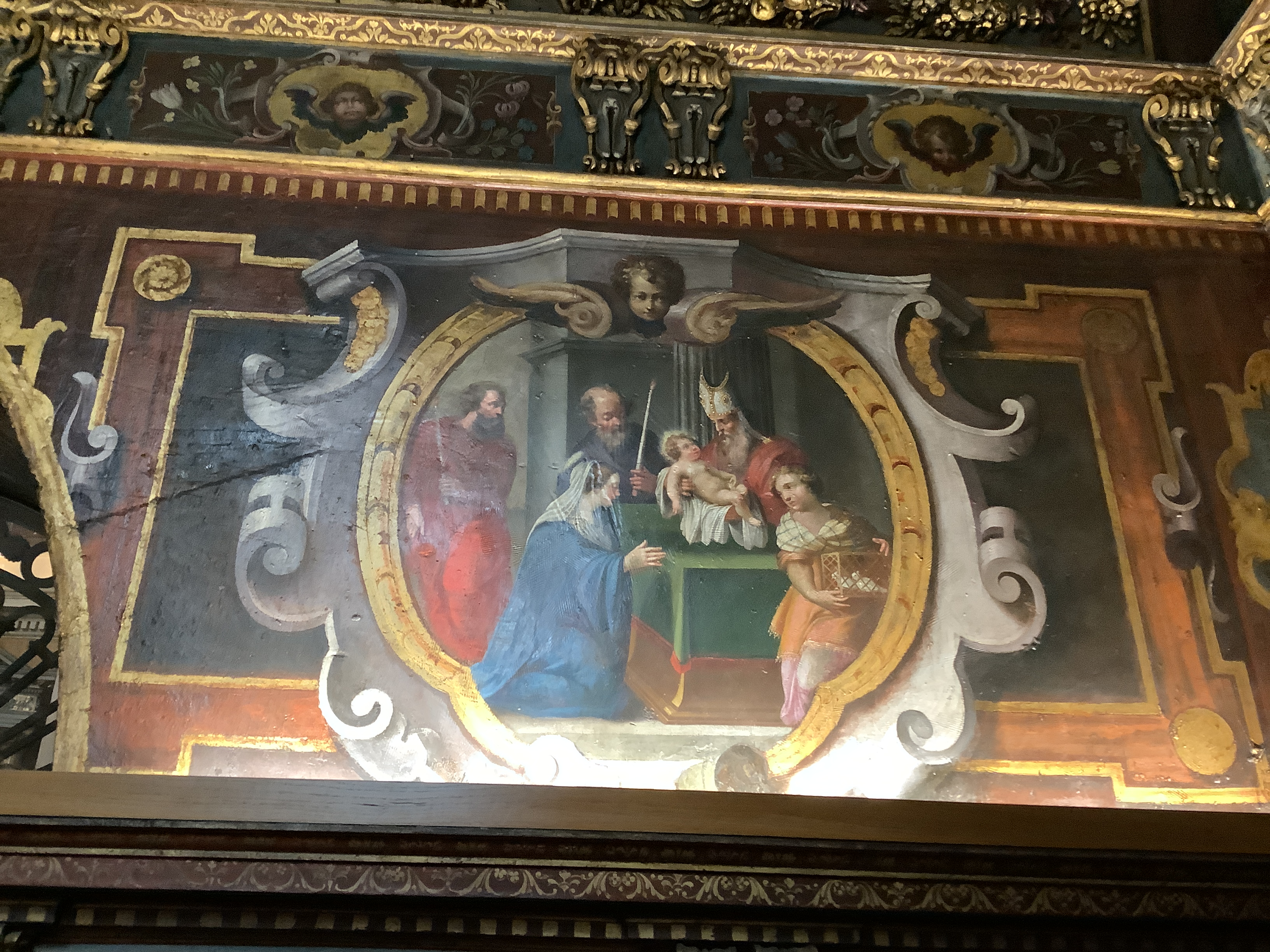
Decorative scene, Chapel of Saint Anne

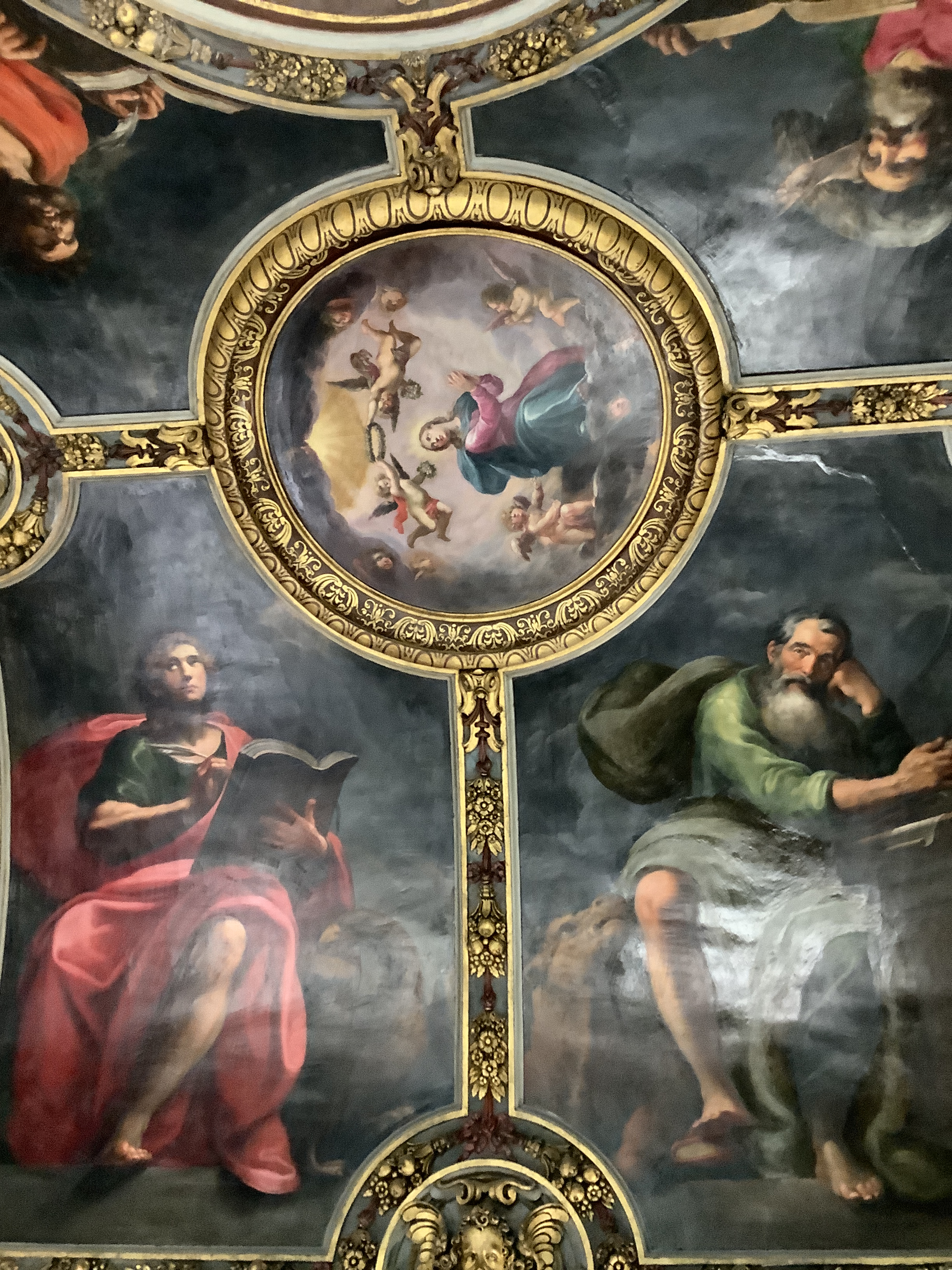
Saint John and Saint Luke; Ceiling of Chapel of Saint Anne

The Chapel of Saint Jacques or Francis of Assisi), begun in 1635, is a lateral chapel along the nave which is also entirely covered with dense Baroque art and decoration. It was sponsored by Jacques d'Éstampes de Molinay, his wife and son beginning in 1635.

The altar painting depicts Saint James the Great, painted by Pierre van Mol in the 17th century. The ceiling paintings depict episodes of the life of Saint James, arranged around the central painting of the Transfiguration of Christ. The paintings on the left side show scenes from King Louis IX, or Saint Louis, including his departure for the Seventh Crusade, his charitable activities, and his reception of the relics of the passion of Christ at Sainte Chapelle.

The wall on the right is devoted to scenes from the life of Saint Dominic, the founder of the Dominican Order, including his meeting with Francis of Assisi, Saint Dominic, the founder of the Dominicans, and Saint Ange, the leader of the Carmelites.

The frescos are largely the work of Abraham Van Diepenbeeck (1596-1675), a Flemish artist who apprenticed in the studio of Peter Paul Rubens in Antwerp,

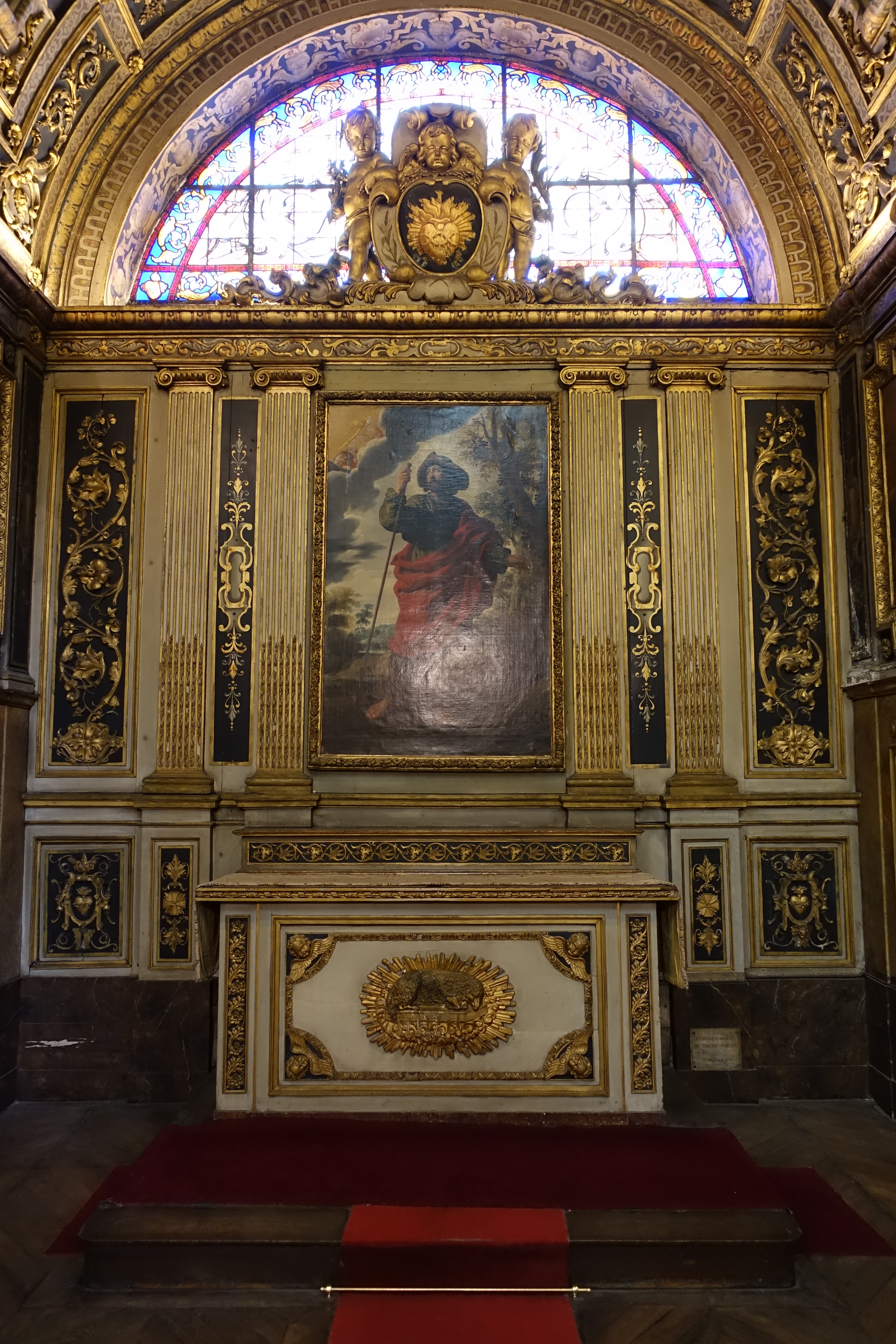
Chapel of Saint-Jacques

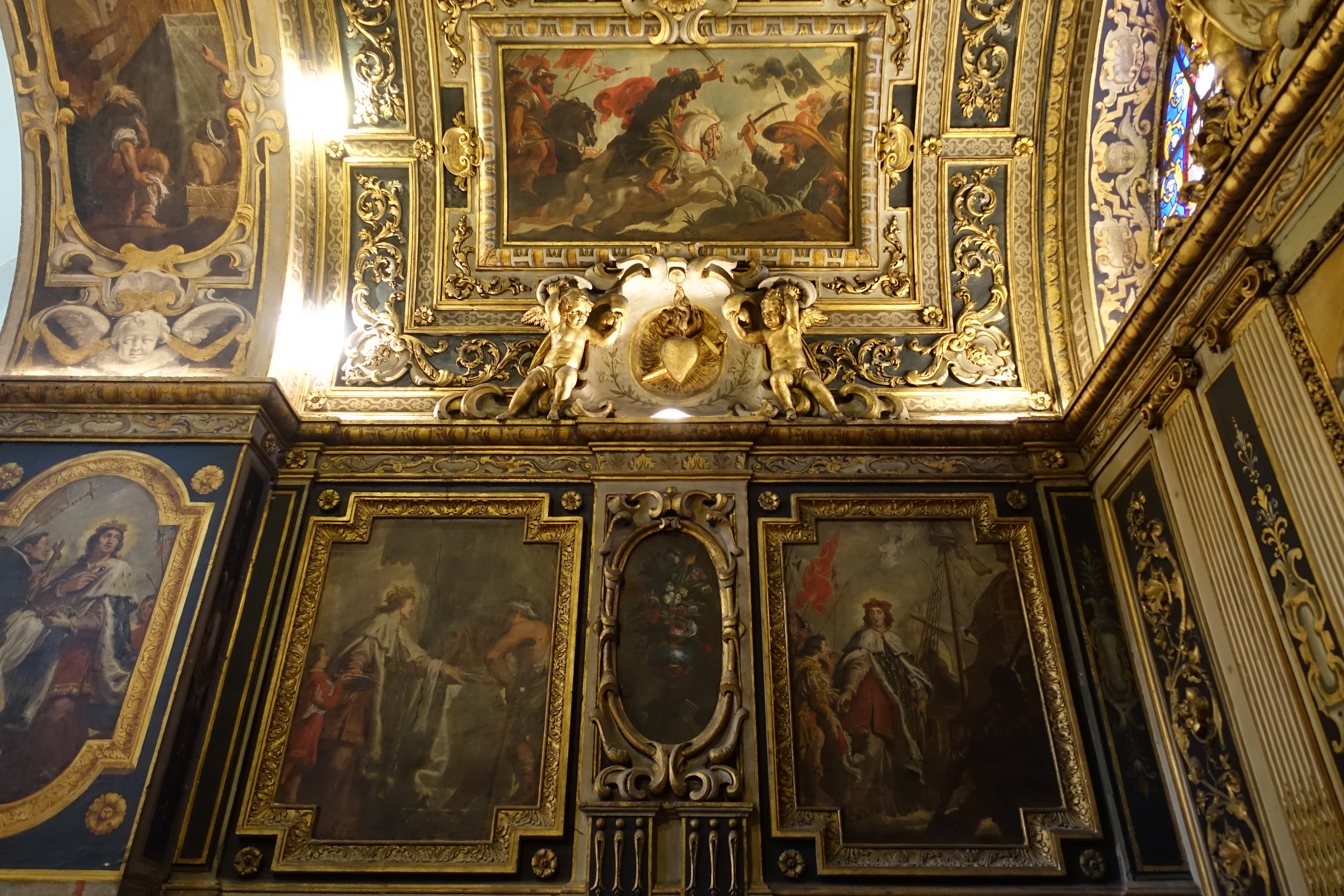
Chapel of Saint-Jacques

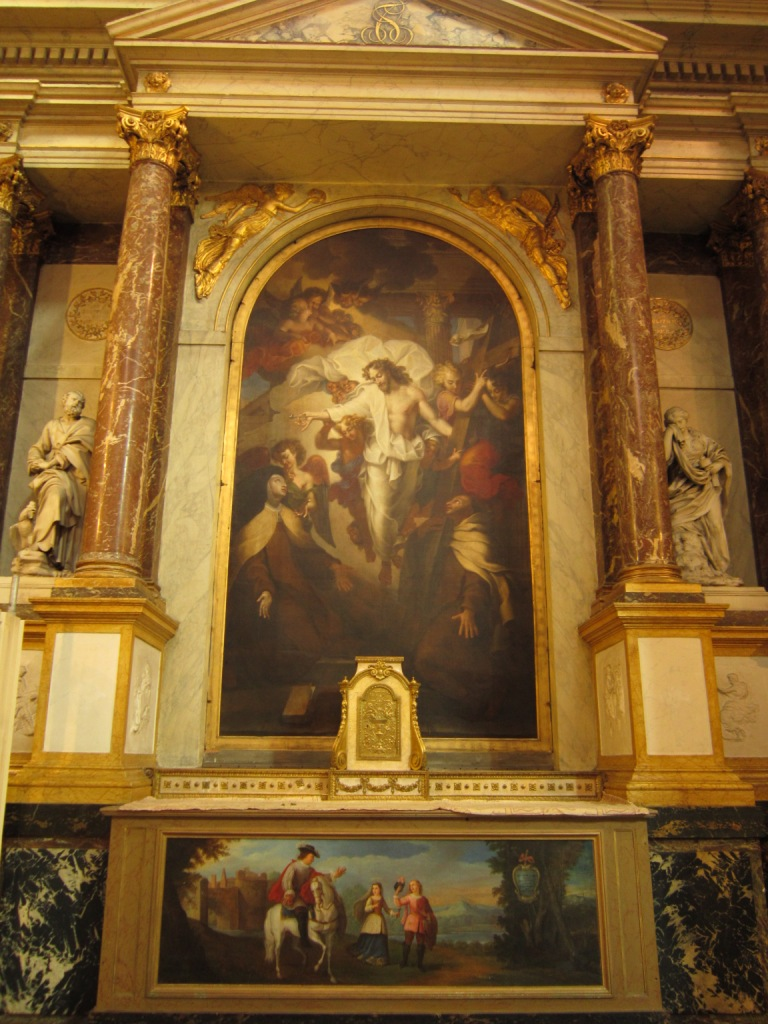
“Christ appears to sainte Thérèse d'Avila and to Saint John of the Cross” (c. 1676) (right transept chapel) (Jean-Baptiste Corneille (1649-1695)

The Chapel of the Virgin, is located on the left side of the transept, to the left of the main altar. Its central element is a marble statue of the Virgin Mary by the Italian sculptor Antonio Raggi (1624–66), a pupil of Gian Lorenzo Bernini. It was offered to the church by Cardinal Antonio Barberini, the brother of Pope Urban VIII, and the Papal envoy to Paris in 1656. It was installed in the church in 1663. Though the sculpture was not made by Bernini himself, it was made to his design, as is the marble altar, resembling a Roman temple, with delicate columns and friezes, is placed below and in front of it.

The Chapel of the Martyrs of 1792 on the right side of the nave, displays a lit to the names of the 115 victims of the September Massacres, killed September 2 1792. They were beatified in 1926.

The paintings of floral bouquets on the arches over the chapel, by Claude Deruet (1588-1660), from between 1630 and 1640, are some earliest original decor of the church. Other early work on the ceiling includes paintings of the crowing of the Holy Virgin by the Trinity, and figures of the archangels Michael, Gabriel, and Raphael, and painting our contains the only example of the original interior decoration from the early church, depicts Angel-Musicians, as well as a more recent scene, "The Virgin appears to the priests massacred in September 1792", an event that took place at the church during the September Massacre in 1792, during the French Revolution.

The pulpit of the church, located near the chapel, was carved in the 17th century for another church. It was the pulpit used by the priest Father Lacordaire, who, during his time at the church, introduced the custom of giving commentaries or sermons based on a Biblical text, a practice very rare before his time, but now very common in Paris churches.

At the end of the left transept is an alabaster statue of Saint Francis by Gilles Guérin.

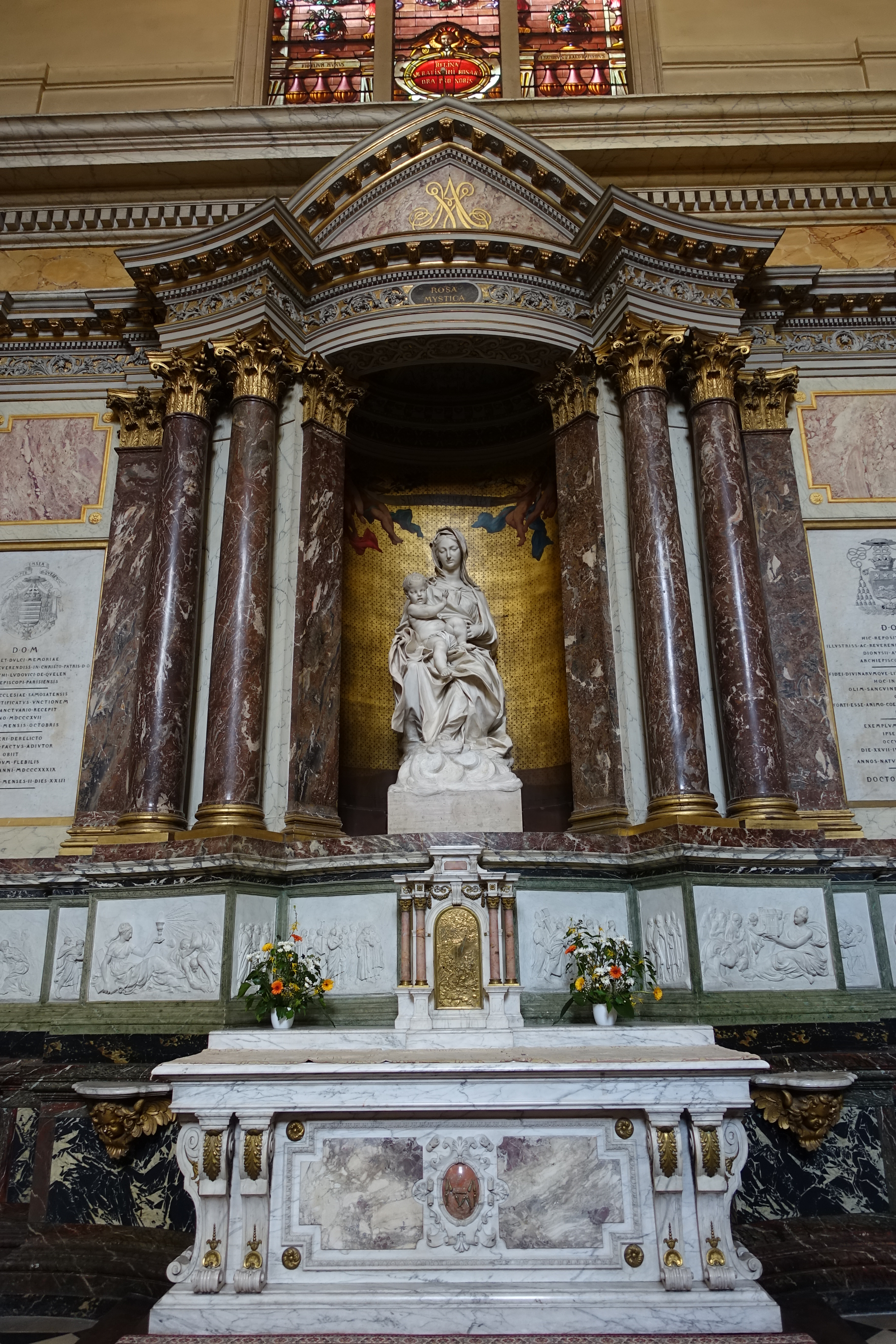
Chapel of the Virgin with Bernini altar

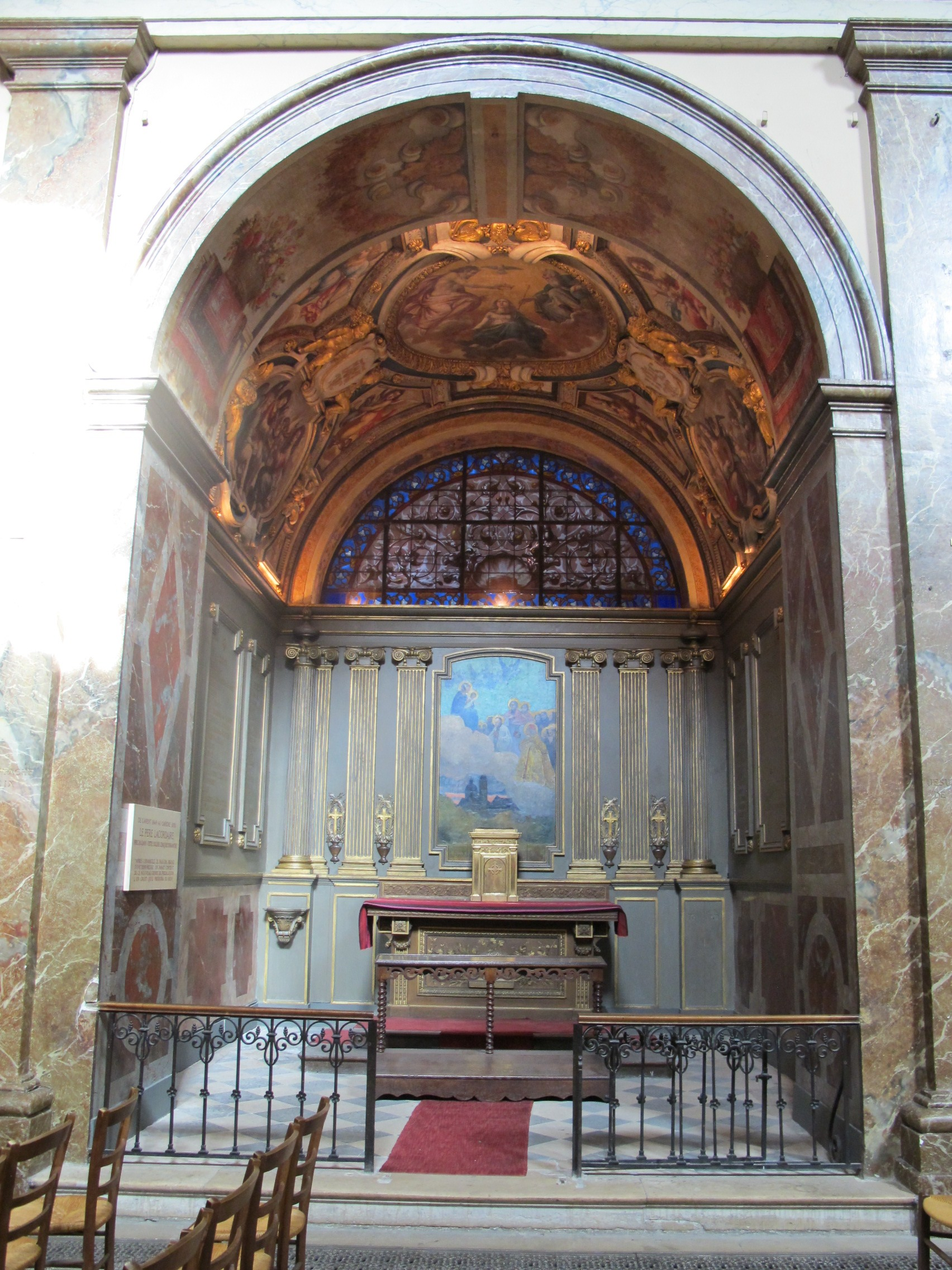
Chapel of the Martyrs

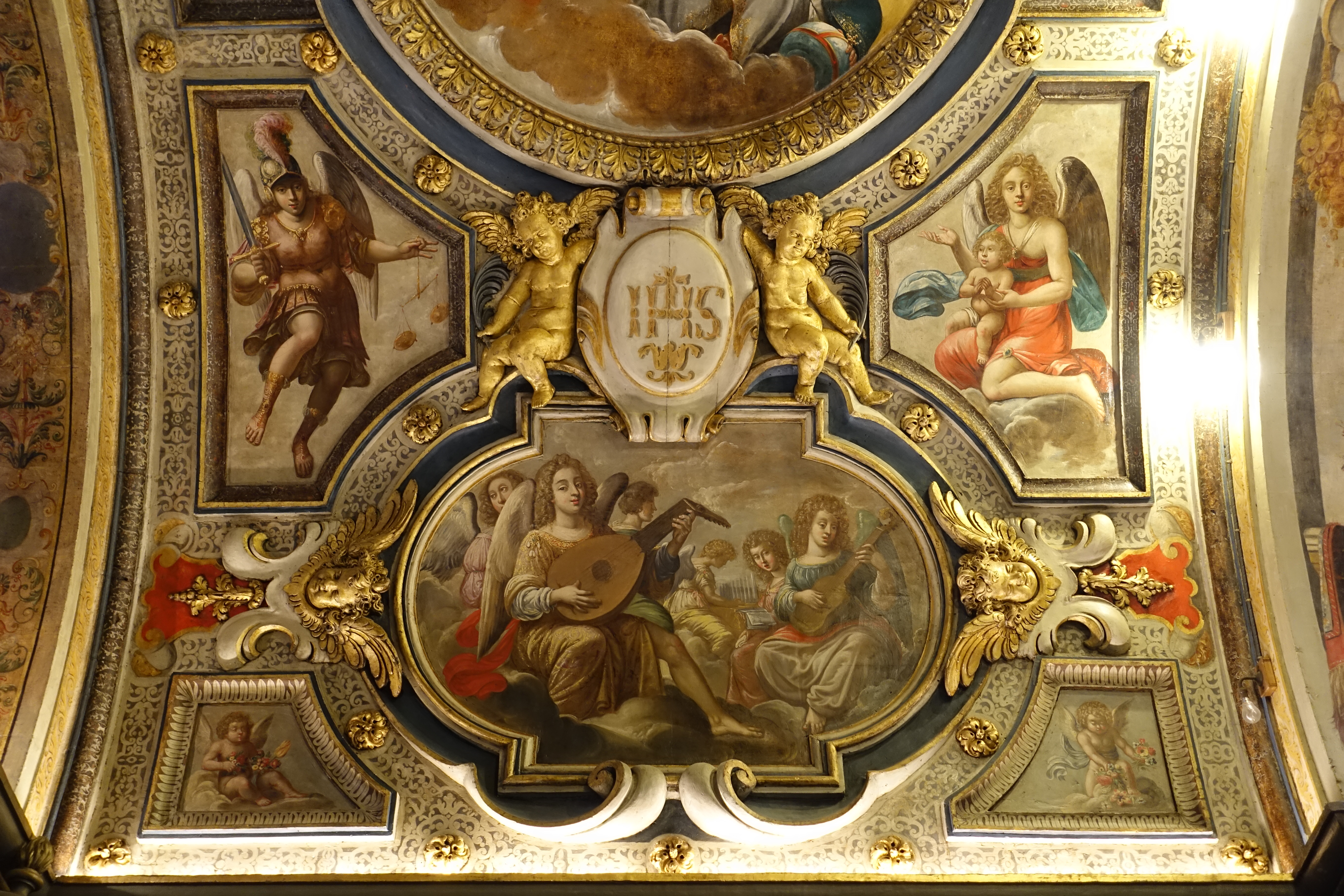
Angel-musicians on the vaults of the Chapel of Martyrs

The Chapel of Thérèse of Lisieux, a modern Saint (1873-1897) canonized 1925, is located at the right of the transept, the crossing point between the nave and choir. The rector of the Seminary of the Catholic Institute and future Cardinal, Verider, commissioned the chapel as well as a group of four paintings in the chapel about her life, painted by Paul Buffet (1864-1941), and his brother Amédée (1869-?). One panel depicts the Saint watching over French soldiers in the trenches in the First World War. The style of the two brothers resembles that of Maurice Denis and the Nabis, active at that time. In addition to the statue of Saint Therêse, this chapel contains two 17th-century statues representing contrition, made by Jacques Sarazin (1592-1660). One depicts Saint Peter, and the other Mary Magdalene, Their faces, and even their twisted figures, suggest sorrow and repentance.

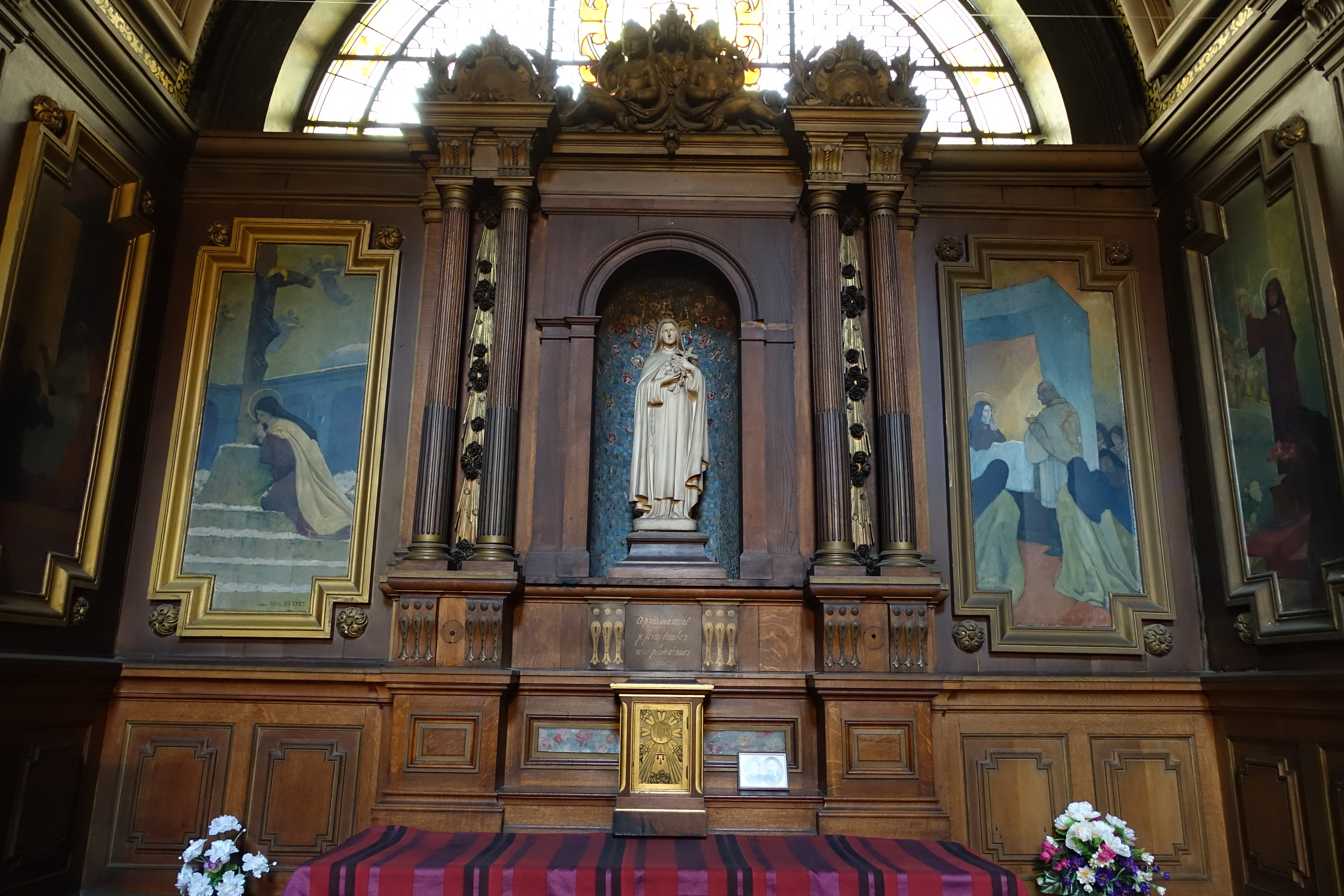
Chapel of Sainte-Thérèse de Lisieux, with paintings by Paul and Amadee Buffet.

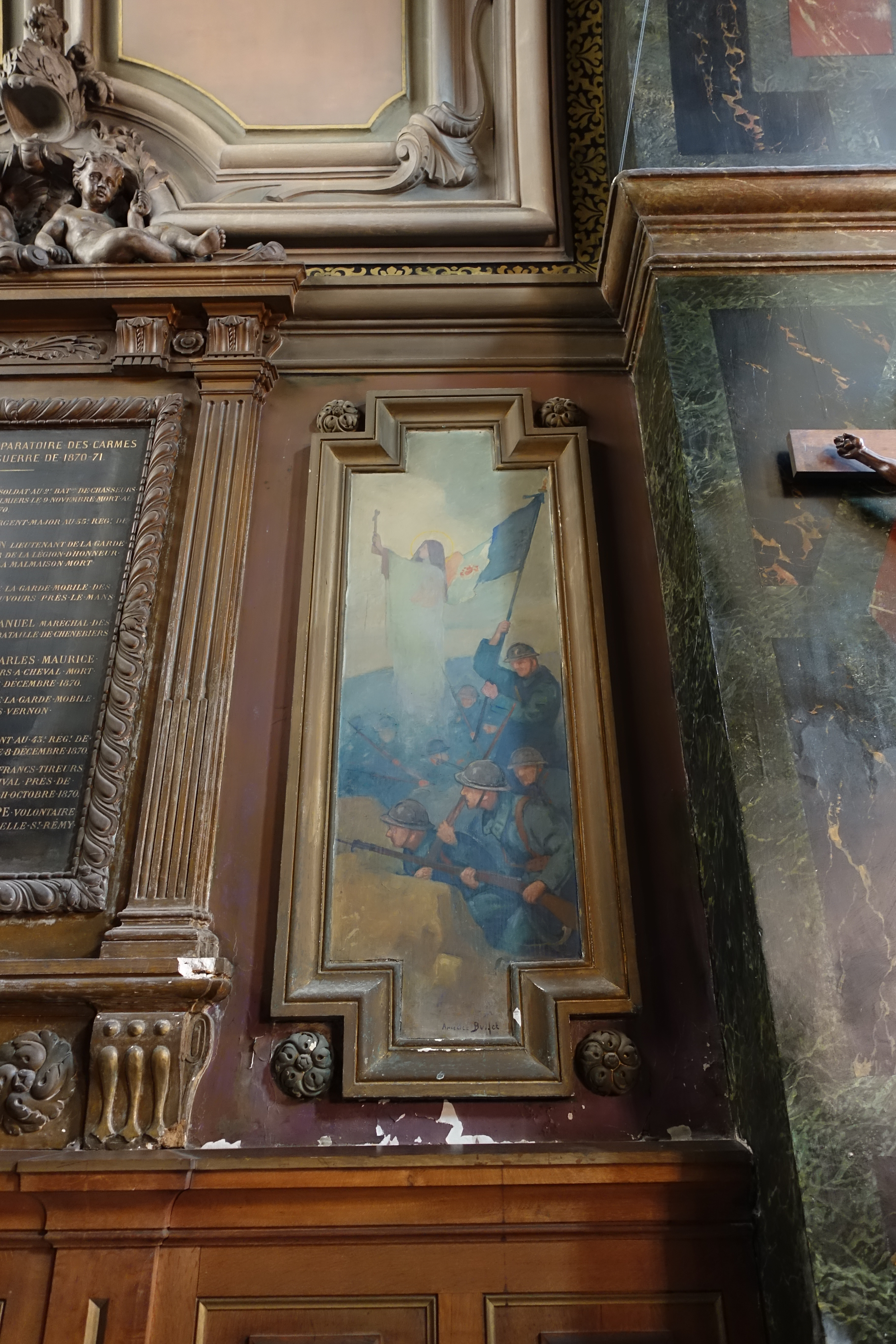
Saint Therese over the World War I battlefield

== The Crypt of the Martyrs ==
The Crypt of the Martyrs contains a memorial to the clerics who were killed at the church during the September Massacres (2-4 September 1792) of the French Revolution. In the 1860s, during the construction of a new street as part of Napoleon III's reconstruction of Paris, several mass graves were found in trenches close to the church; the bones showed injuries from the massacre. In 1867 the remains were transferred to the new chapel. In 1926, one hundred ninety-one were recognized as martyrs by Pope Pius IX, and were beatified. These included Jean Marie du Lau-d'Allemans, the Archbishop of Arles, two bishops, 127 priests, and fifty-six other religious and laical figures.

The Crypt also contains several additional chambers, including the tomb of Frederic Ozanam, the founder of the Society of Saint-Vincent-de-Paul, who was beatified in 1997. It also holds a number of tombs of sisters of the earlier convent of the Carmelites.

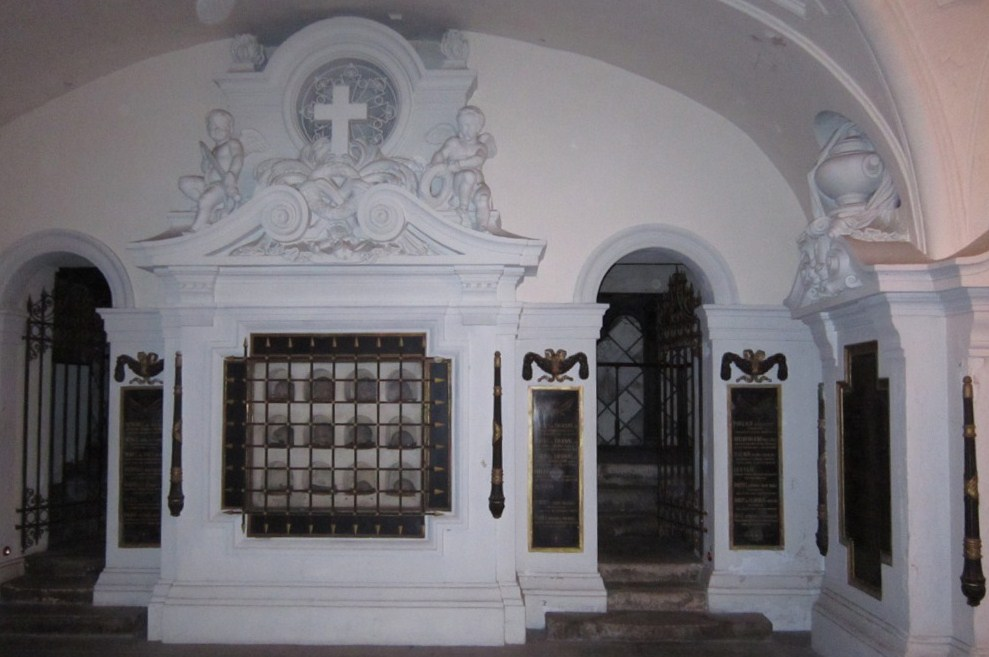
The Crypt of the Martyrs

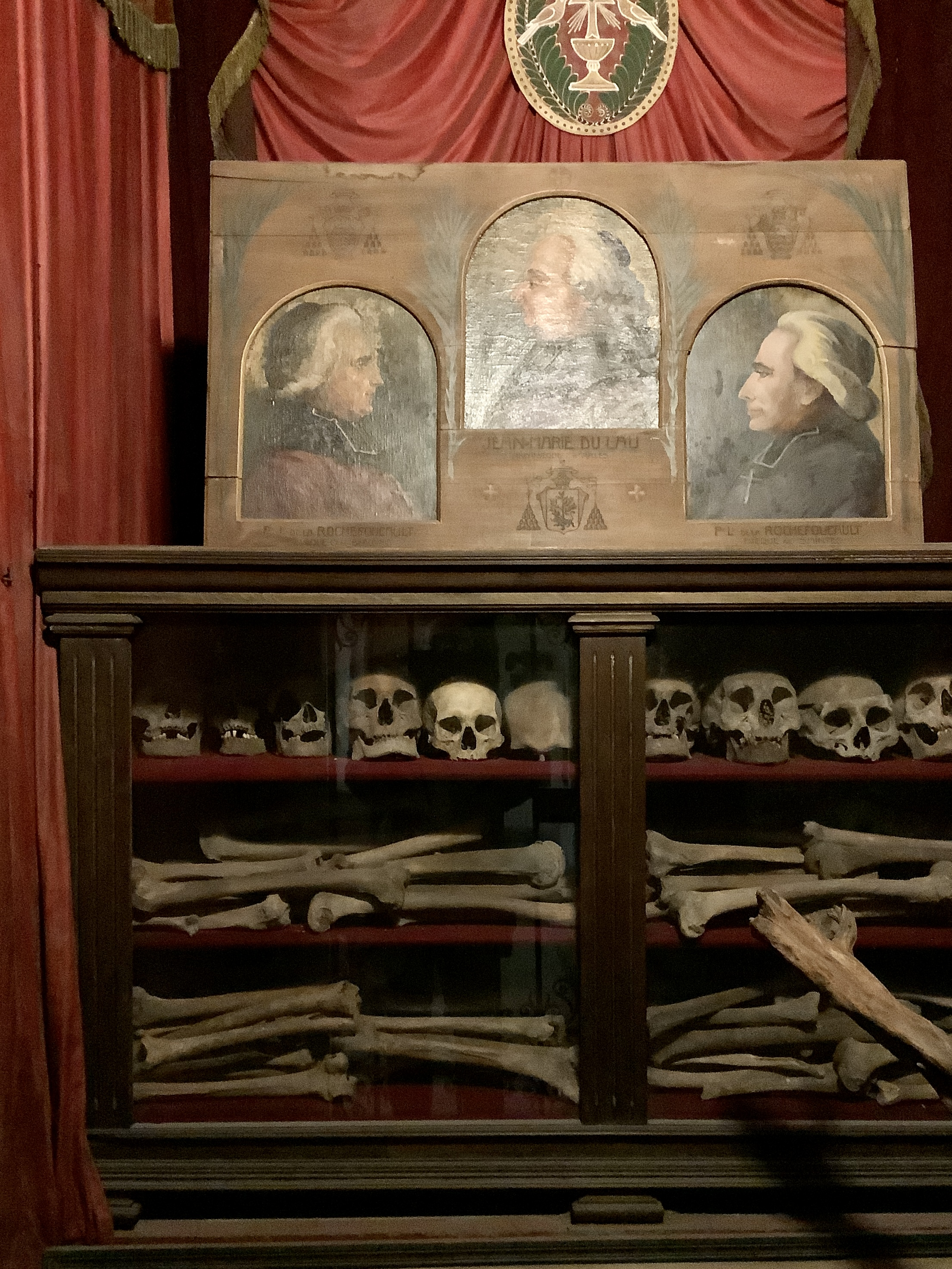
Portraits of martyred bishops and bones of massacred clergy

== Art and Decoration ==
=== Stained Glass ===
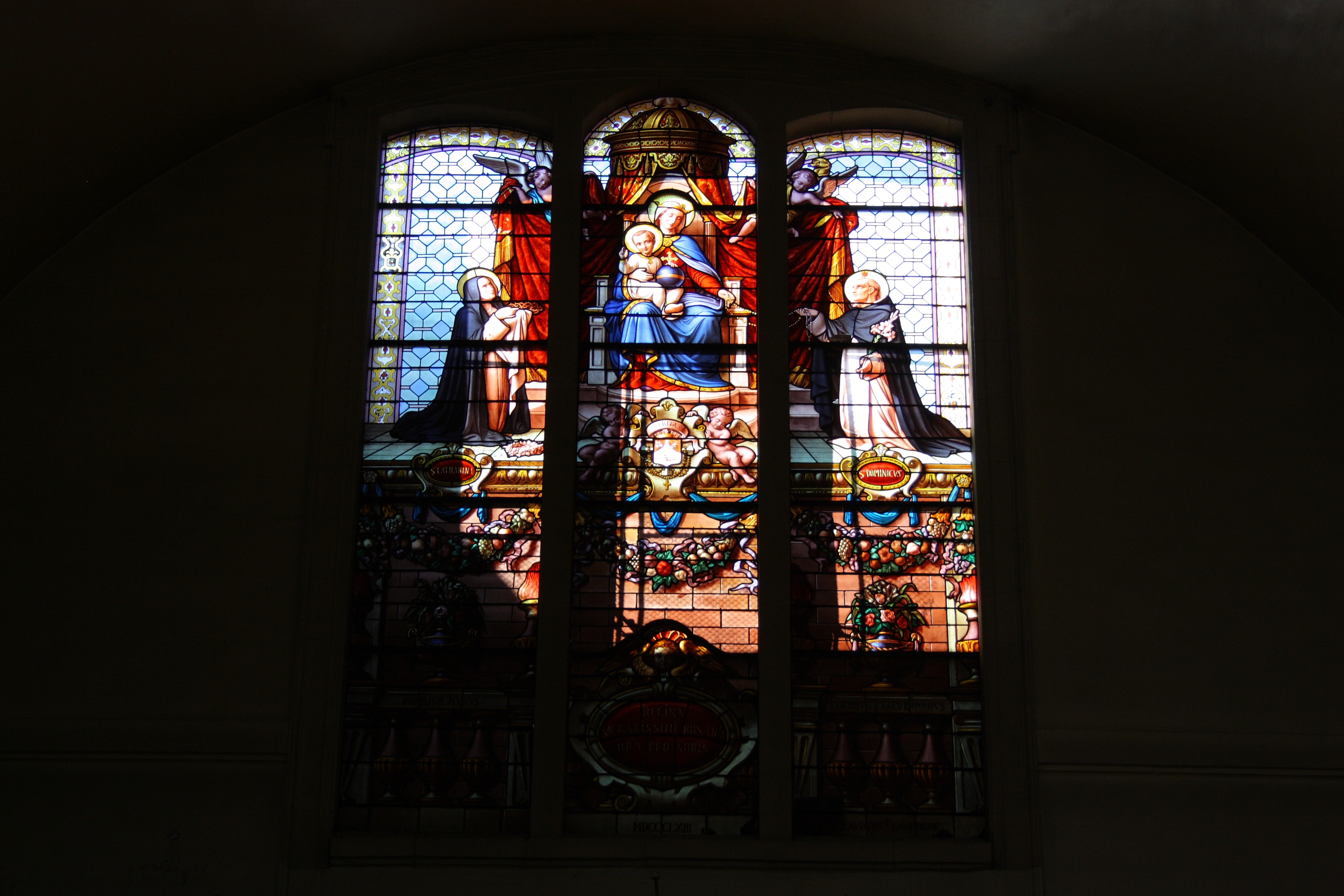
Christ and the Virgin Mary with Saint Dominic

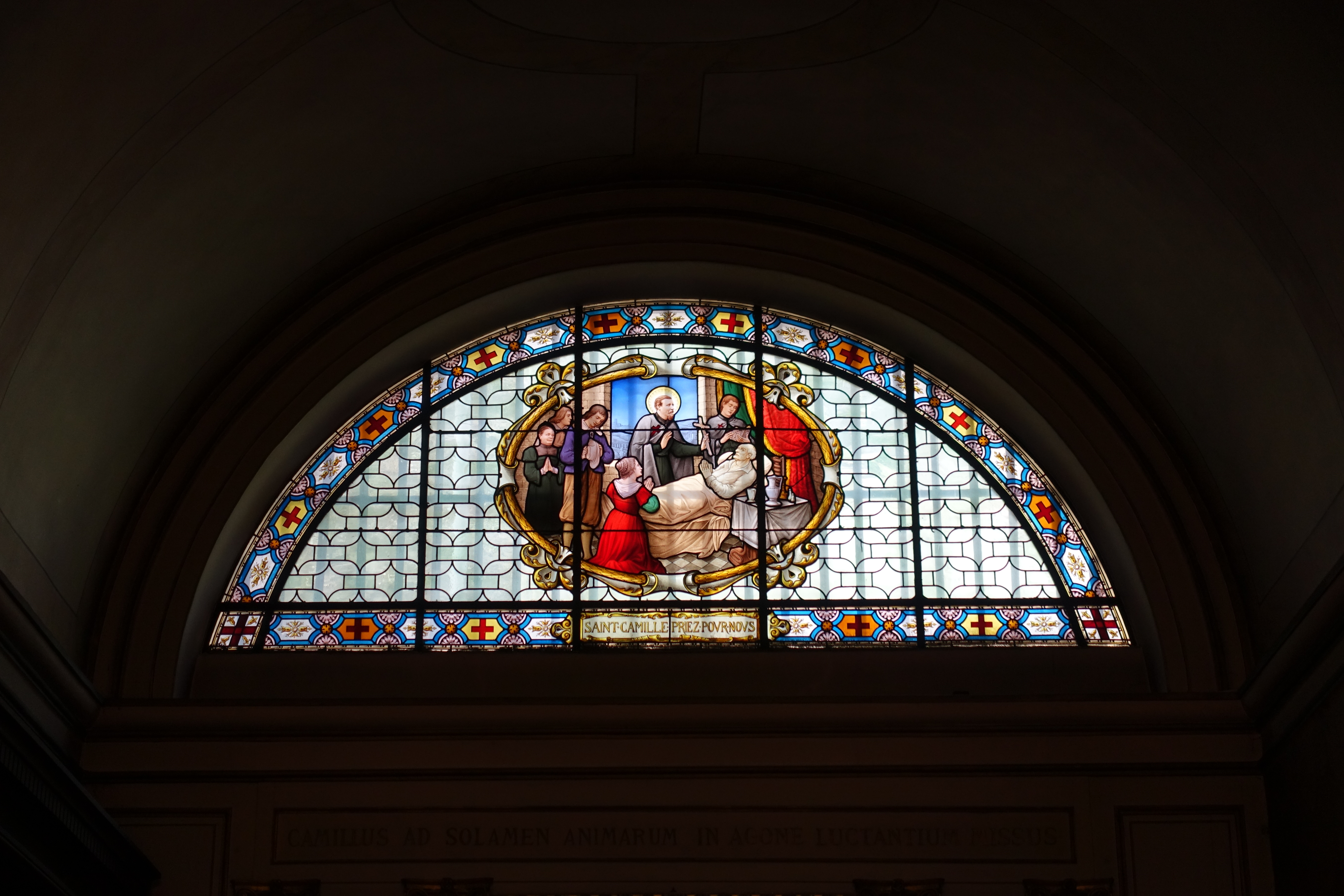
The death of Saint Camille de Lellis (1856), (late 19th century)

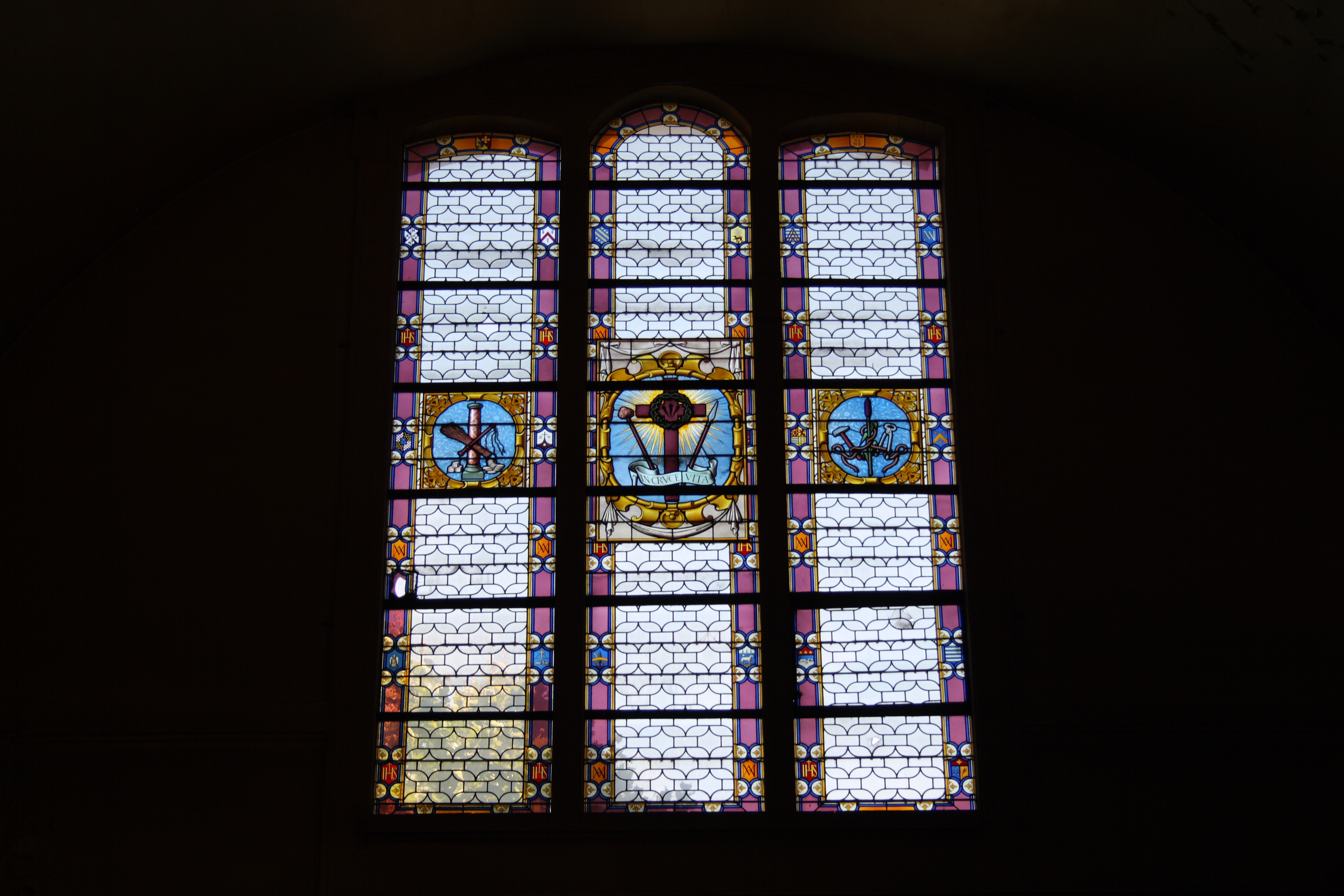
Upper window in nave

== The Organ ==
The organ was constructed by the Lorraine organ builder Henri Didier in. 1902. It was restored in 1971 and again in 1992. Ih has twenty-five stops on two keyboards and a set of pedals. The transmission from the keyboard to the pipes is mechanical rather than electronic.

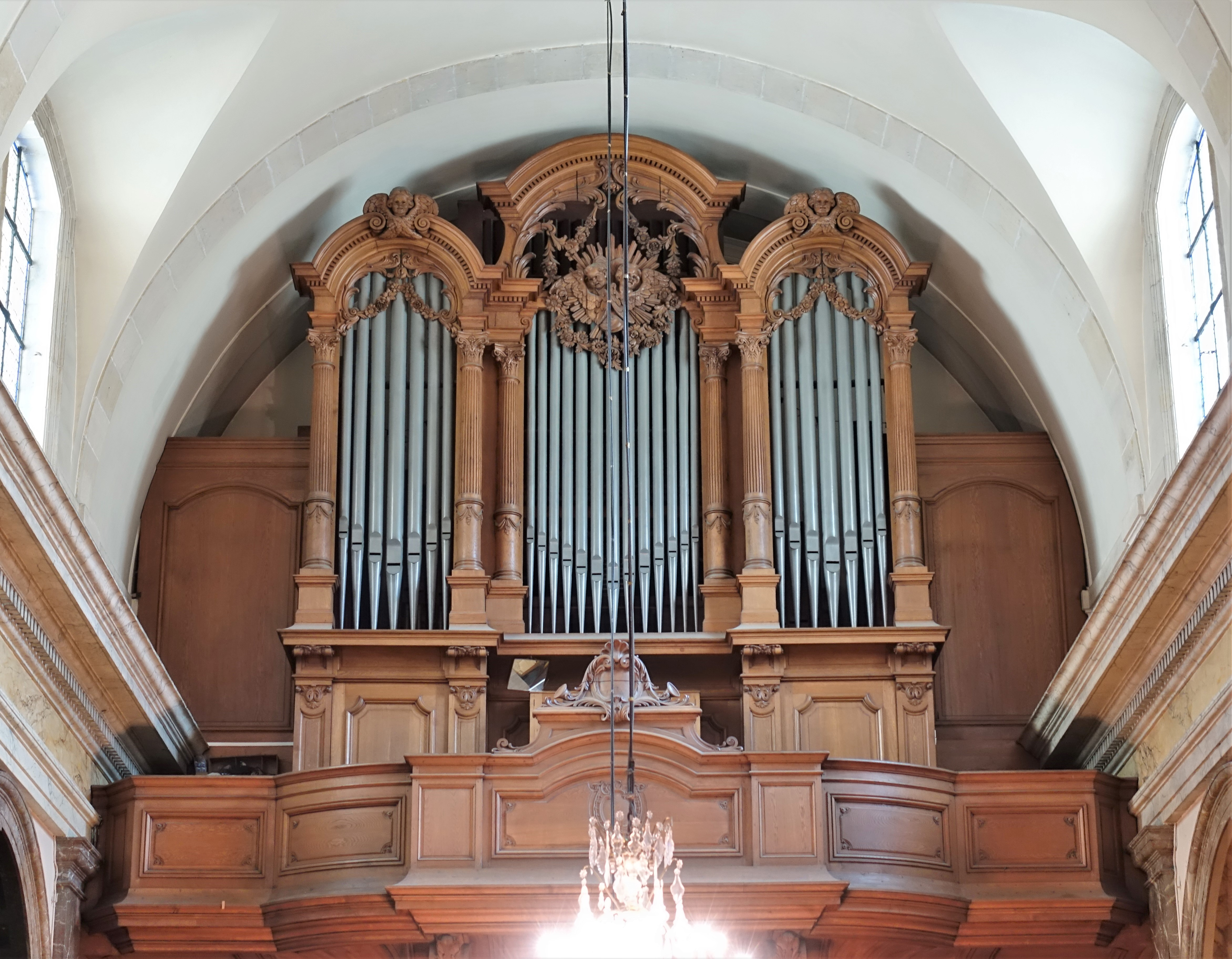
The organ of the church

== See also ==
- List of works by Gian Lorenzo Bernini

== Bibliography ==
- Dumoulin, Aline; Ardisson, Alexandra; Maingard, Jérôme; Antonello, Murielle (2010). Églises de Paris (in French). Éditions Massin, Issy-Les-Moulineaux. ISBN 978-2-7072-0683-1.
- Losserand, Léonore (2019). Église Saint Joseph des Carmes (in French). Église Saint Joseph des Carmes. ISBN 979-10-699-4051-2.
- Wittkower, Rudolf (1966). Gian Lorenzo Bernini: the sculptor of the Roman baroque. London: Phaidon P.

(Some portions of this article have been translated from the French Wikipedia article)

- (in French) Gérard Cholvy (editor), Un évêque dans la tourmente révolutionnaire, Jean Marie du Lau, archevêque d'Arles, et ses compagnons martyrs, 1792–1992, colloque du II^{e} centenaire tenu à Arles les 2–4 octobre 1992, Montpellier, Université Paul Valéry, 1995.
