= Jacques Jules Bonnaud =

Haitian-French Jesuit priest and martyr

Blessed Jacques Jules Bonnaud SJ
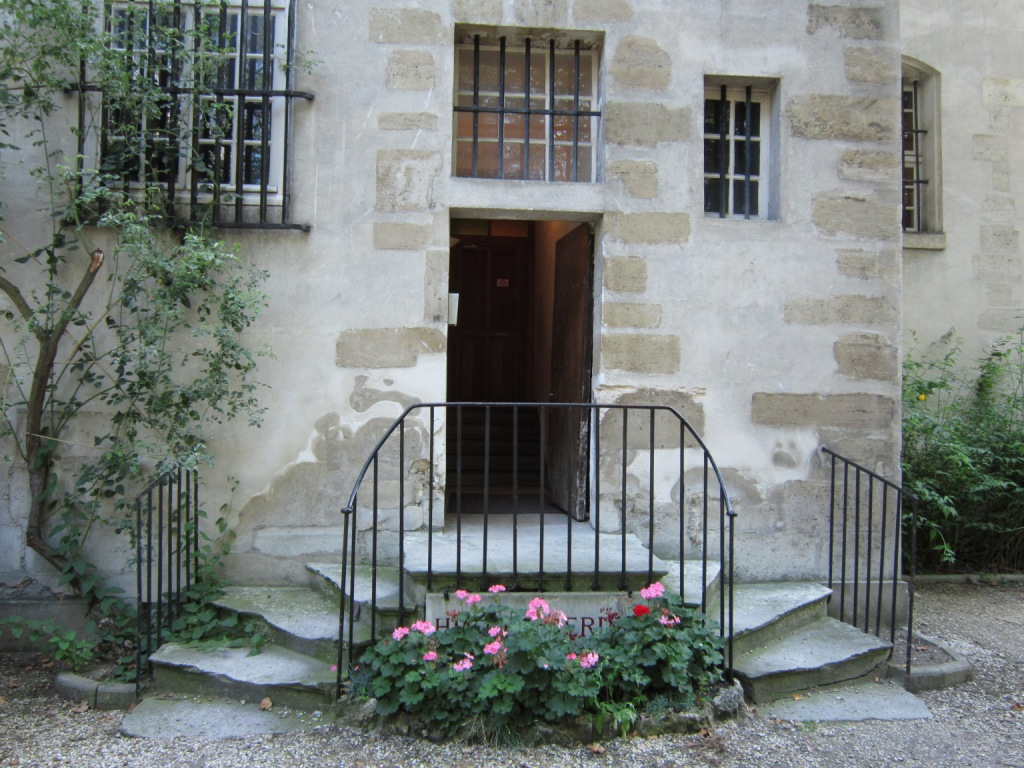
- Saint-Joseph-des-Carmes Church in Paris, formerly a prison where Bonnaud and others were martyred in 1792 during the French Revolution.
- Born: October 27, 1740; Cap-Haitien, Haiti
- Died: September 2, 1792 (aged 51); Carmes Prison, Paris
- Cause of death: Assassination
- Honored in: Catholic Church
- Beatified: October 17, 1926 by Pope Pius XI
- Major shrine: Saint-Joseph-des-Carmes
- Feast: September 2 November 5 (All Saints and Blesseds of the Society of Jesus)

Jacques Jules Bonnaud, SJ (also James Julius Bonnaud or Jacques-Julien Bonnaud; 1740 – 1792) was a Haitian-born French Jesuit priest who, with several others, was assassinated in the September Massacres during the Reign of Terror as part of the French Revolution. He was likely the first Haitian professor or theologian in Europe.

Having died out of loyalty to the Catholic Church and the pope, he is recognized as a martyr and was beatified on October 17, 1926, by Pope Pius XI, at the same time as many other secular priests, Jesuits, Capuchins and Carmelites who were victims of the excesses of the Revolution. As of 2024, he Is the only beati of African descent from North America.

== Biography ==
Born in Cap Français in Saint-Domingue (now Cap-Haïtien, Haiti) on October 27, 1740, as the son of a French father and Black Haitian mother, Jacques Bonnaud came to France while still young to avoid racism. He received his education at the College of La Flèche and entered the Jesuit novitiate on December 20, 1758. He taught for two years in Quimper, likely becoming the first Haitian professor or theologian in Europe.

When the Jesuits were expelled from France in 1762, Bonnaud continued his ecclesiastical studies at the Saint-Firmin Seminary in Paris and then moved to the Southern Netherlands where he completed his studies in theology, civil law and canon law. After his priestly ordination, he first served the Diocese of Paris (1764). From 1783 to 1787, he was vicar general under Pierre-Louis de Leyssin, Archbishop of Embrun.

Bonnaud was very present in theological and ecclesiastical controversies. In his Tartuffe épistolaire démasqué, he proved that a letter attributed to Pope Clement XIV was the work of a former priest of the Oratory, Luigi Caraccioli. He was also the author of an anti-Protestant 1787 pamphlet, Speech to be read to the Council, in the presence of the King, by a patriotic minister, on the project of granting Civil Status to Protestants, familiarly called "Mémoire de Madame de Noailles" (because she was responsible for "taking it to the members of the Council and Parliament").

In 1788, Bonnaud was called to Lyon by Archbishop Yves-Alexandre de Marbeuf, who made him one of his vicars general and assigned him the priories of Sermaize and Arnicourt. Bonnaud was the author of the archbishop's pastoral letter in 1789, alerting the faithful and calling on them to be vigilant and courageous in the face of imminent religious persecution during the French Revolution.

Bonnaud then settled in Paris, where he wrote pamphlets and tracts defending the rights of the Catholic Church and opposing the Civil Constitution of the Clergy, which he refused to sign and derided as Jansenist. Arrested around August 10, 1792, Bonnaud was locked up in the Carmes Prison in Paris, where he was massacred by the sans-culottes along with many other priests and religious during the September Massacres on September 2, 1792.

== Veneration ==
Considered to have died a victim of anti-Catholic persecution, Bonnaud was declared a martyr alongside his companions and was beatified in 1926 by Pope Pius XI. As of 2024, he is still the only Black beatified person from North America.
