= Joseph-Marie Gros =

French secular cleric and clergy deputy

Joseph-Marie Gros (23 May 1742, Lyon - 3 September 1792, Paris) was a French secular cleric and clergy deputy to the Estates-General of 1789.

== Life ==
After being ordained he received his theology doctorate and taught at the College of Navarre from 10 May 1785. As curé of the Paris church of Saint-Nicolas-du-Chardonnet, his charity efforts gained him the nickname of "the new saint Vincent de Paul". On 30 April 1789 he was elected a clergy deputy in the fourth place, after Antoine-Éléonor-Léon Leclerc de Juigné, François-Xavier-Marc-Antoine de Montesquiou-Fézensac and abbé De Chevreuil. He sat on the right, defended the Ancien régime and took the oath on clergy goods.

He and all his parish's priests refused to preach at Saint-Nicolas-du-Chardonnet in favour of the Civil Constitution of the Clergy and so he was dismissed from that parish and imprisoned as a counter-revolutionary in January 1791 in the Carmes Prison. He died there in the September Massacres of 1792. He was beatified on 17 October 1926 by pope Pius XI as one of the "Holy September Martyrs".

== Sources ==
- "Joseph-Marie Gros", in Robert et Cougny, Dictionnaire des parlementaires français, 1889
- Sur Gros et l'Assemblée :Histoire du clergé de France pendant la Révolution, Volume 1, Hippolyte François Regnier-Destuurbet, pages 98 and following
