= Quentin Varin =

French painter (1584–1626)

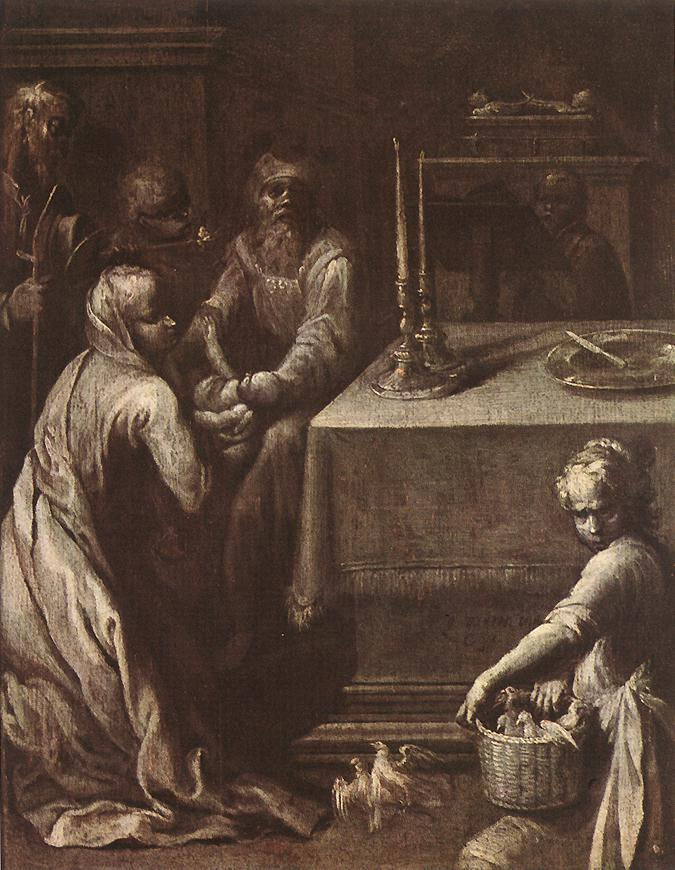
Presentation of Christ in the Temple, grisaille, c. 1620

Quentin Varin (1584 in Beauvais – 1626 in Paris), was a French painter of the second School of Fontainebleau. He was the teacher of Nicolas Poussin. He is known for religious works.
