= Henri de Vic =

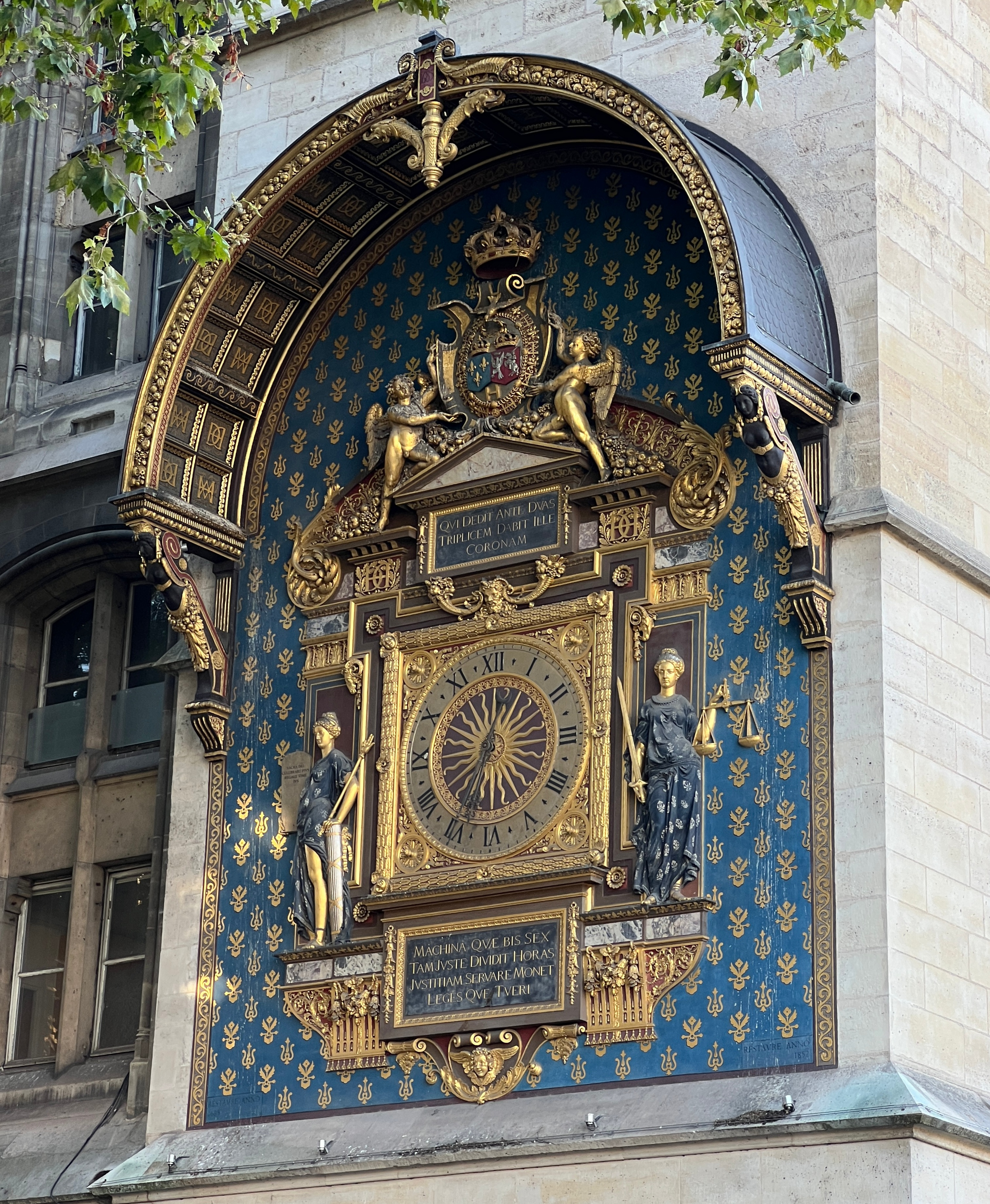
Present-day appearance of the clock made by Henri de Vic on the façade of the Conciergerie in Paris

Henri de Vic or Henri de Wic (fl. 14th century) was a late medieval clockmaker, from Germany or Lorraine. He was commissioned to make a clock for one of the towers of the Conciergerie in Paris by King Charles V of France. The clock, still in place, was installed in 1370.
