= Conciergerie =

Medieval building in Paris, France

The Conciergerie
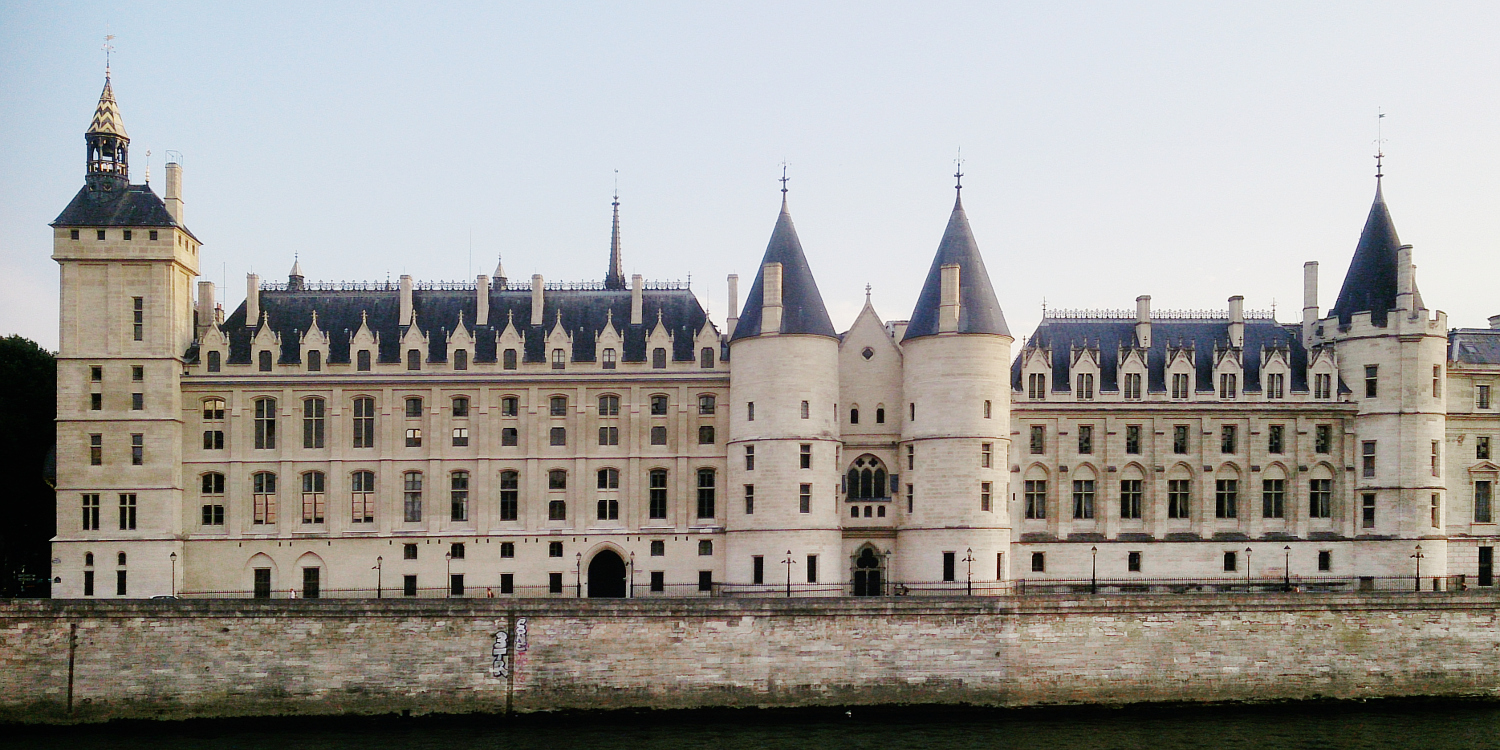
- The Conciergerie

- Location within Paris

General information
- Type: palace, courthouse, prison
- Architectural style: Gothic and Gothic Revival
- Location: Île de la Cité, Paris, France
- Coordinates: 48.8564°N 2.3456°E

The Conciergerie (French pronunciation: [kɔ̃sjɛʁʒəʁi]) (English: Lodge) is a former courthouse and prison in Paris, France located on the west of the Île de la Cité below the Palais de Justice. It was originally part of the former royal palace, the Palais de la Cité, which also included the Sainte-Chapelle. Two large medieval halls remain from the royal palace. During the French Revolution, 2,781 prisoners, including Marie Antoinette, were imprisoned, tried and sentenced at the Conciergerie then sent to different sites to be executed by the guillotine. It is now a national monument and museum.

== Gallo-Roman fortress to Royal Palace (1st–10th century) ==
In the 1st–3rd century AD, the Ile de la Cité became part of the Gallo-Roman city of Lutetia, on the opposite bank of the Seine. The island was surrounded by a wall, and a fortress of the Roman governor was built at the west end of the island. The Merovingian King Clovis installed his capital there, on the site of the Roman fortress, from 508 until his death in 511. The Carolingian monarchs moved their capital out of the city, but at the end of the 10th century, under Hugh Capet, Paris became the capital of the Kingdom of France. He constructed a large new fortified residence, the Palais de la Cité, on the same site.

== Capetian Palace (11th–14th century) ==
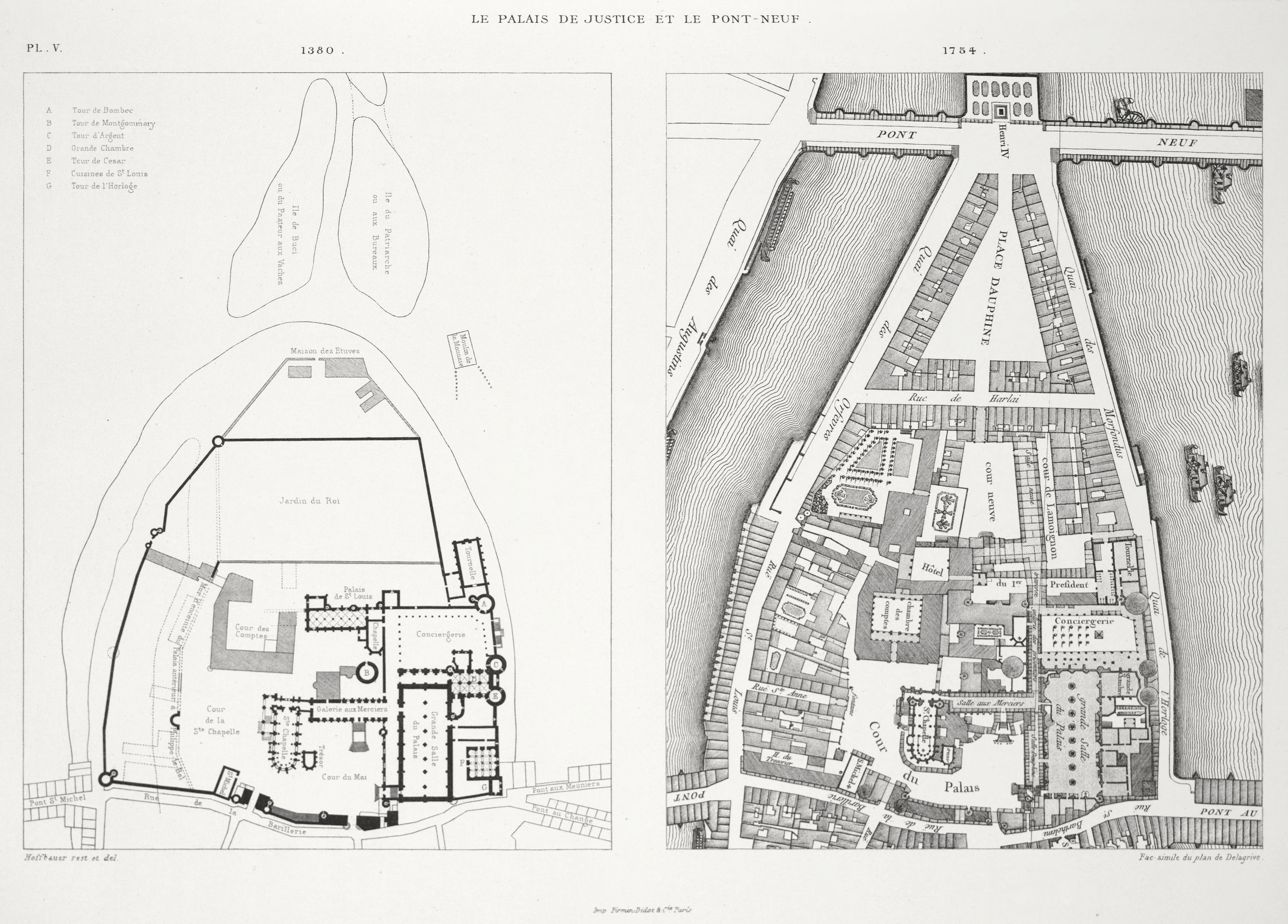
Plan of the Palace and Conciergerie in 1380 and 1754 (double-click for full size)

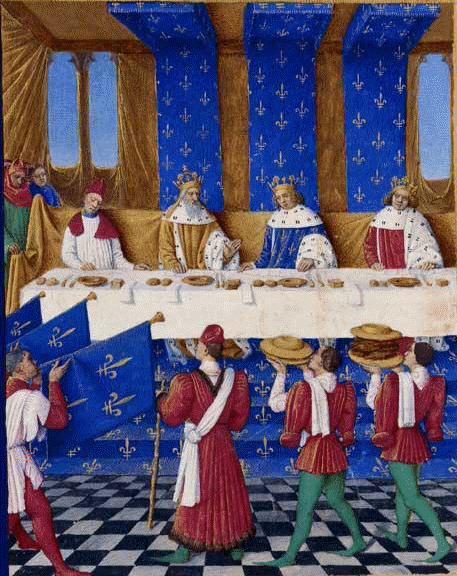
A banquet hosted by Charles V of France in honour of Charles IV, Holy Roman Emperor in the Great Hall (1378)

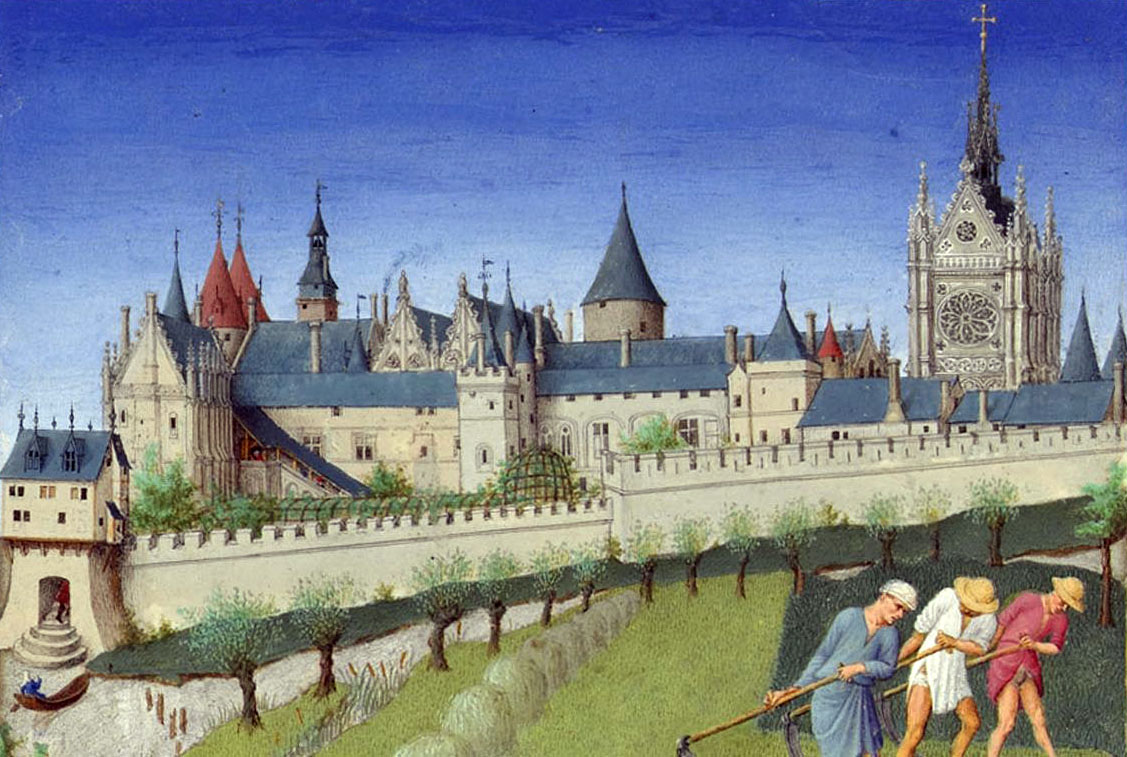
Palais de la Cité in the Très Riches Heures du Duc de Berry (1412–1416). Conciergerie at left rear

From the 11th–14th century, the palace was enlarged and embellished, and gained in importance in the administration of the kingdom. Before he departed on the Third Crusade, Philip II of France delegated his legal authority the Curia Regis, which had regular assemblies, called Parlements, in the Hall of the King, to dispense justice. He moved the royal archives to the building, giving it even greater importance, and named a Concierge, or custodian, to oversee the administration of the palace, which gave the building its name. Philip II created the towered façade on the Seine river side and the great hall. The great hall, with its two side-by-side naves, was used for royal ceremonies and judicial sessions. At one end was an immense table of black marble from Germany, decorated with fleurs-de-lis emblems. A piece of the table is now displayed on the wall of the lower hall. The hall was also decorated with polychrome wooden statues of the kings of France. The "Grand Chronicles of France" by Jehan de Jandun described "A new palace, a marvelous and costly work, the most beautiful that France has ever seen." The only surviving portions of the great hall are the Hall of the Men-at-arms and the Hall of the Guards below.

Philip IV continued the rebuilding between 1285 and 1314. The Grand Hall was built, replacing a smaller earlier hall. The Grand Chamber became the official seat of the Parliament; and he added the silver tower and the Tower of Caesar.

Under Charles V (1364–80), the role of the building changed. He decided to move his residence to the Louvre Castle, and the Hotel Saint-Pol. The concierge of the old palace was given greater authority over lower and middle courts. Prison cells were gradually added to the lower parts of the building, and it became known as the "Conciergerie". Its prisoners were a mixture of common criminals and political prisoners. In common with other prisons of the time, the treatment of prisoners was dependent on their wealth, status and associates. Wealthy or influential prisoners usually got their own cells with a bed, desk and materials for reading and writing. Less-well-off prisoners could afford to pay for simply furnished cells known as pistoles, which would be equipped with a rough bed and perhaps a table. The poorest would be confined to dark, damp, vermin-infested cells known as oubliettes (literally "forgotten places"). In keeping with the name, they were left to live or die in conditions that were ideal for the plague and other infectious diseases, which were rife in the unsanitary conditions of the prison.

== 15th–18th century ==
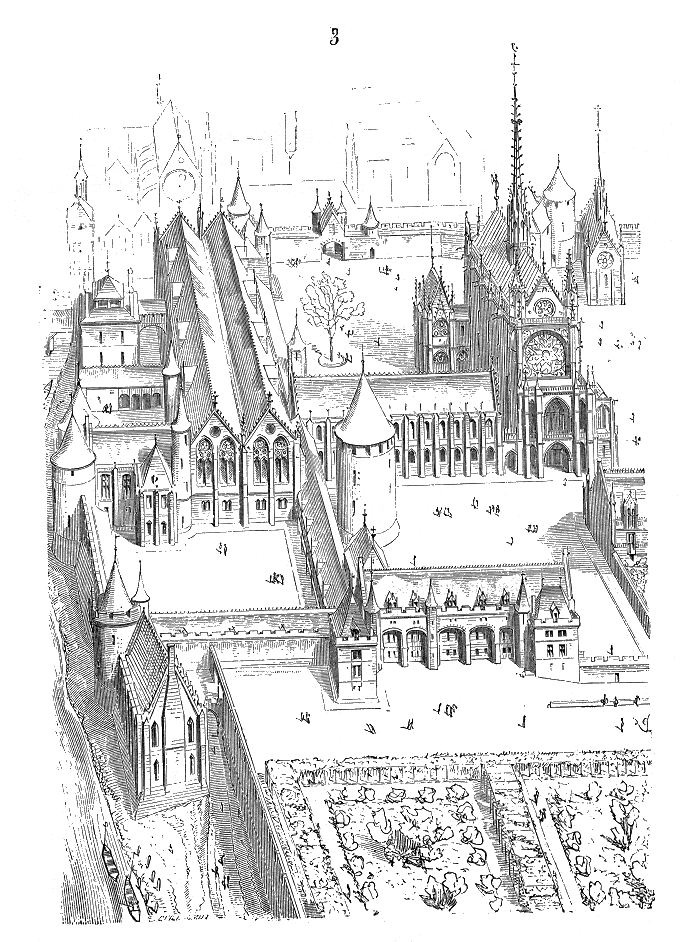
Conciergier (top left) in the 16th c., drawn by Eugene Viollet-le-Duc

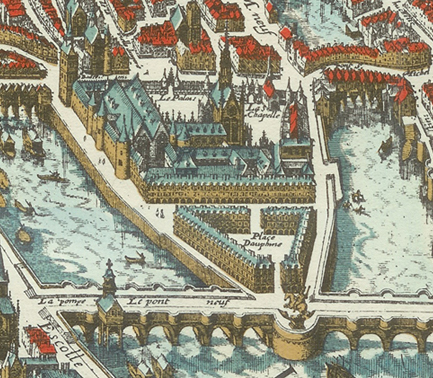
Palais de la Cité in 1615

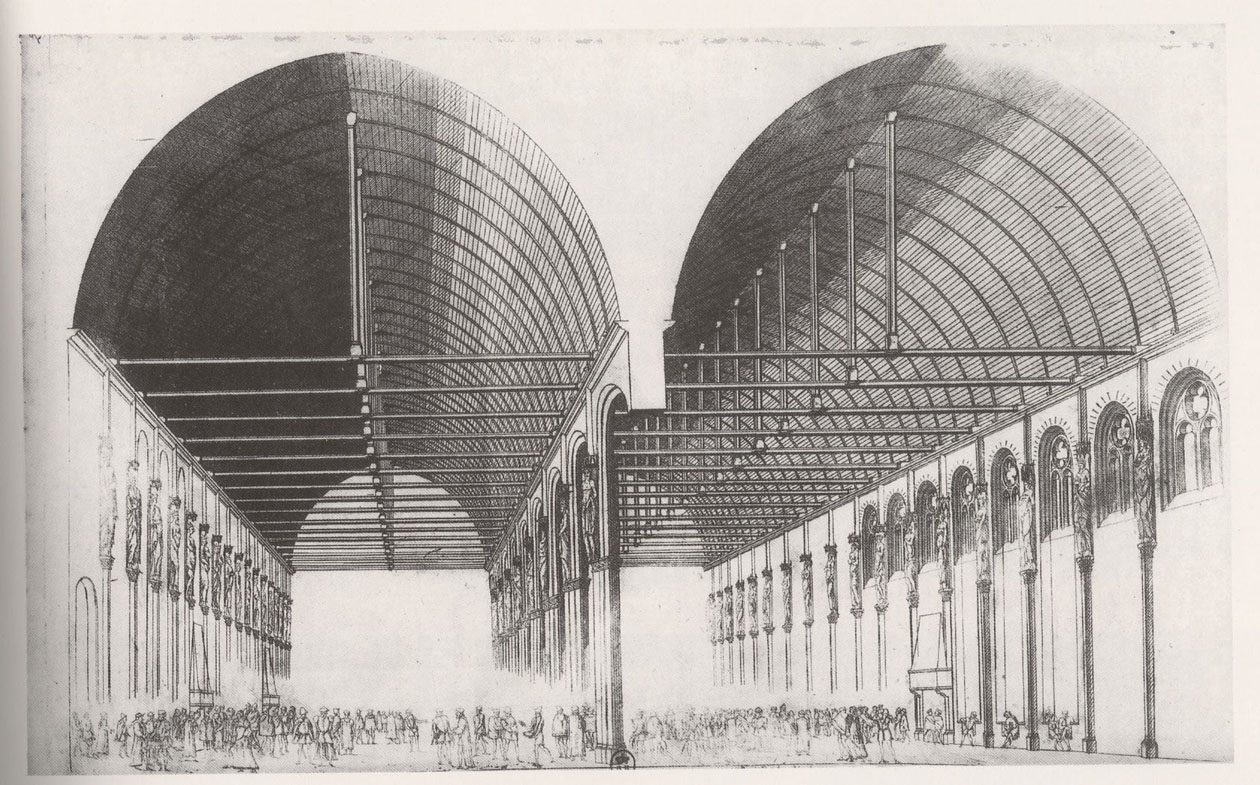
Grand Hall of the Palais de la Cité (1560 – destroyed in 17th c.)

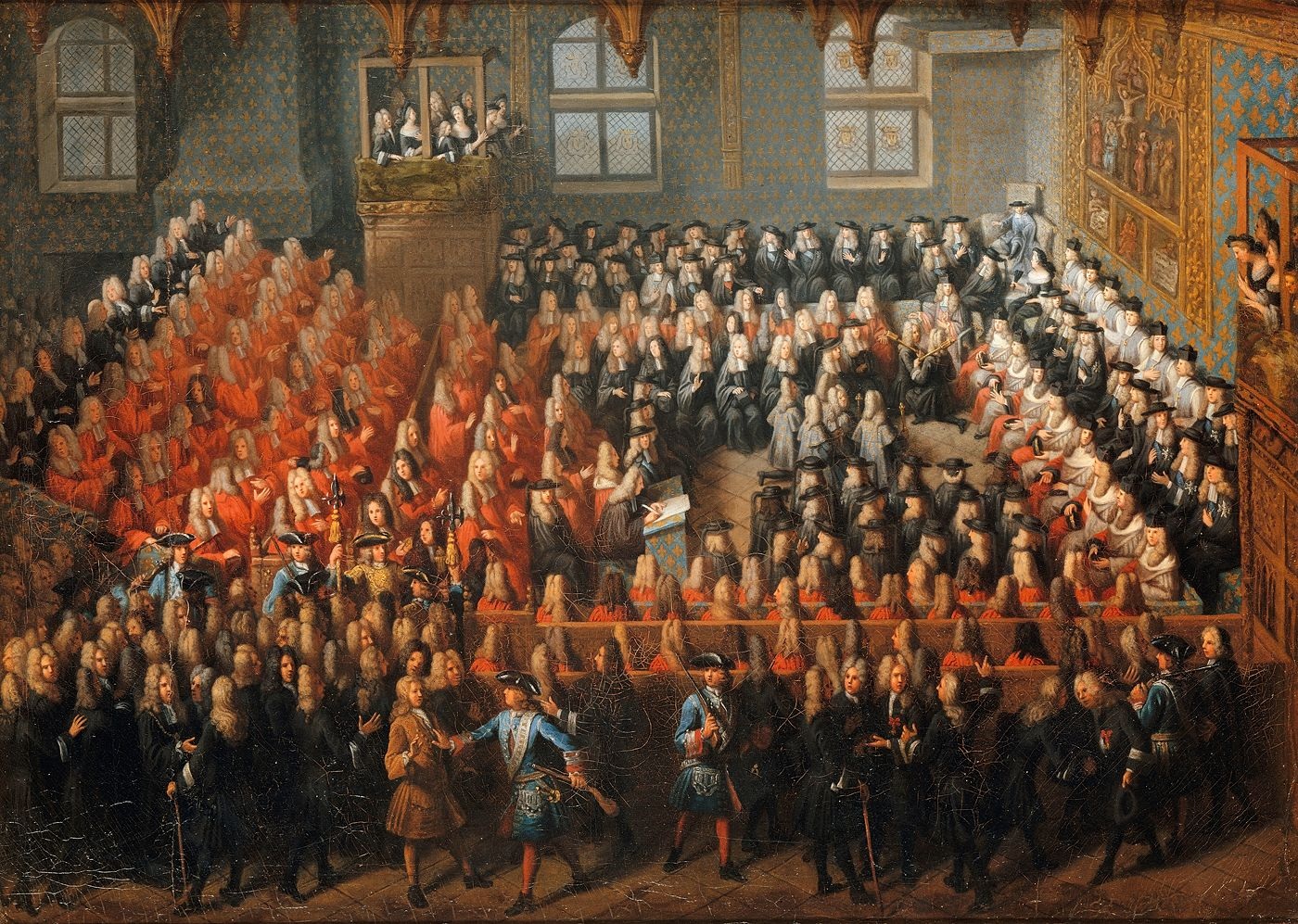
Meeting of the Parlement of Paris in the Grand Chamber (1715)

Without the king as a permanent resident, the buildings underwent many changes to fit its judicial and prison role. Louis XII had the Chamber des Comptes reconstructed, and redecorated the Grand Chamber, used by the Parlement of Paris. A flood of the Seine in the winter of 1689–1690 caused damage to the lower building, while a fire in 1737 destroyed the Chamber des Comptes. It was rebuilt by Ange-Jacques Gabriel. Another fire within the palace in 1776 caused even greater damage, reaching the chamber of the king, the gallery of merchants, and the main tower. The reconstruction following the 1776 fire added new cells to the ground level of the Conciergerie, and replaced the 12th century oratory with the present Chapel.

== The Conciergerie and the Reign of Terror ==
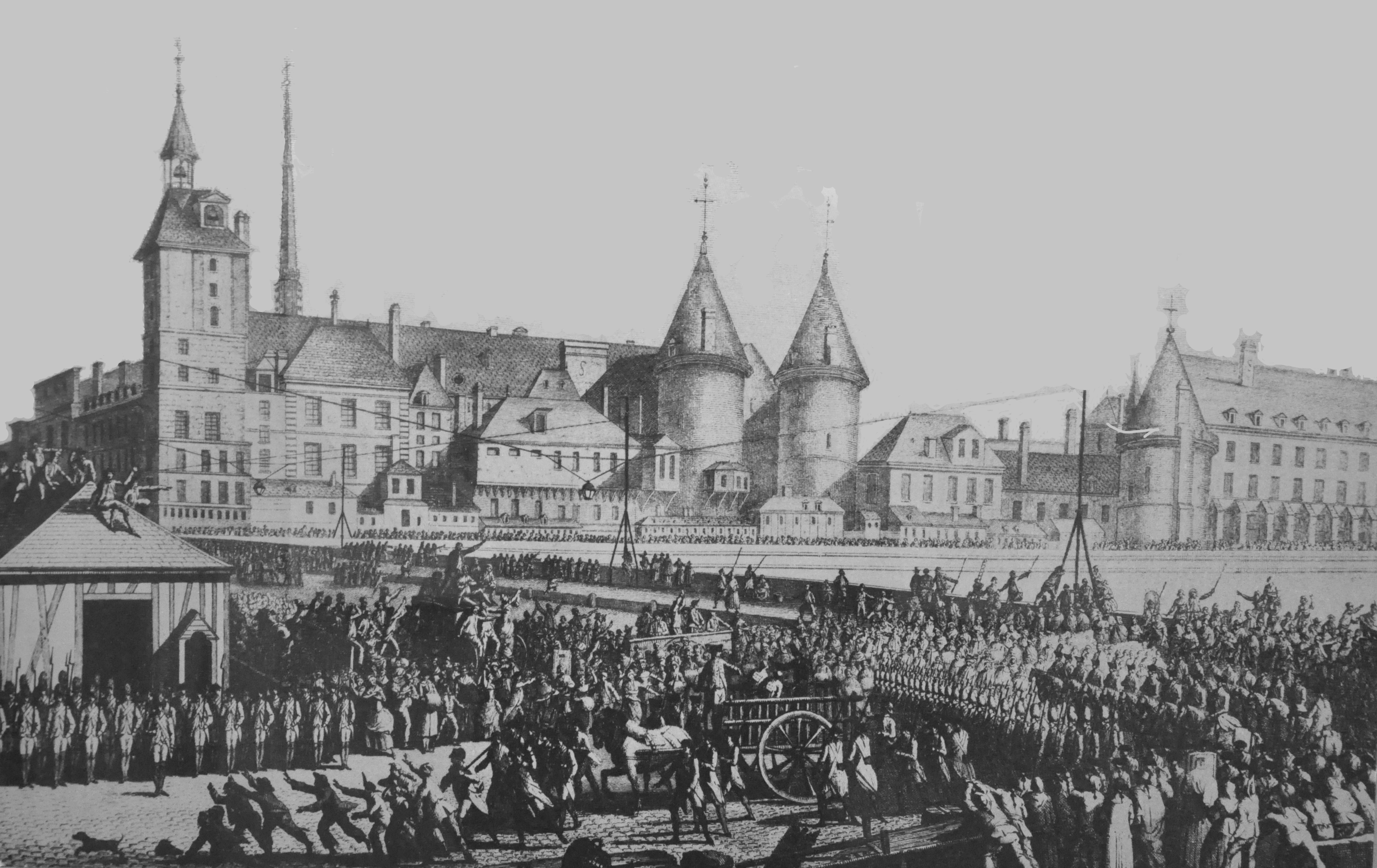
Conciergerie in 1790

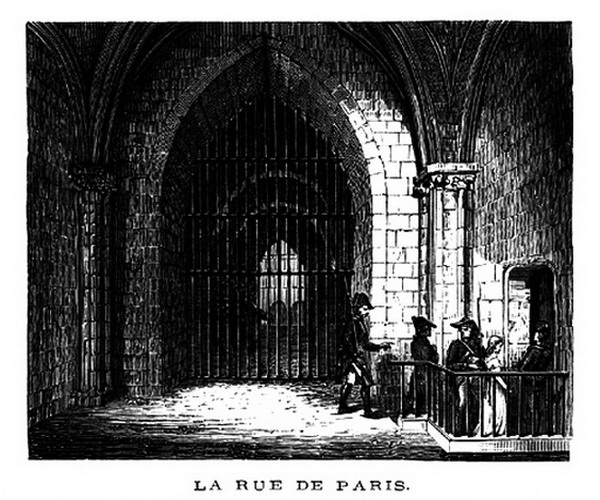
"Rue de Paris" passage into the prison during the Revolution

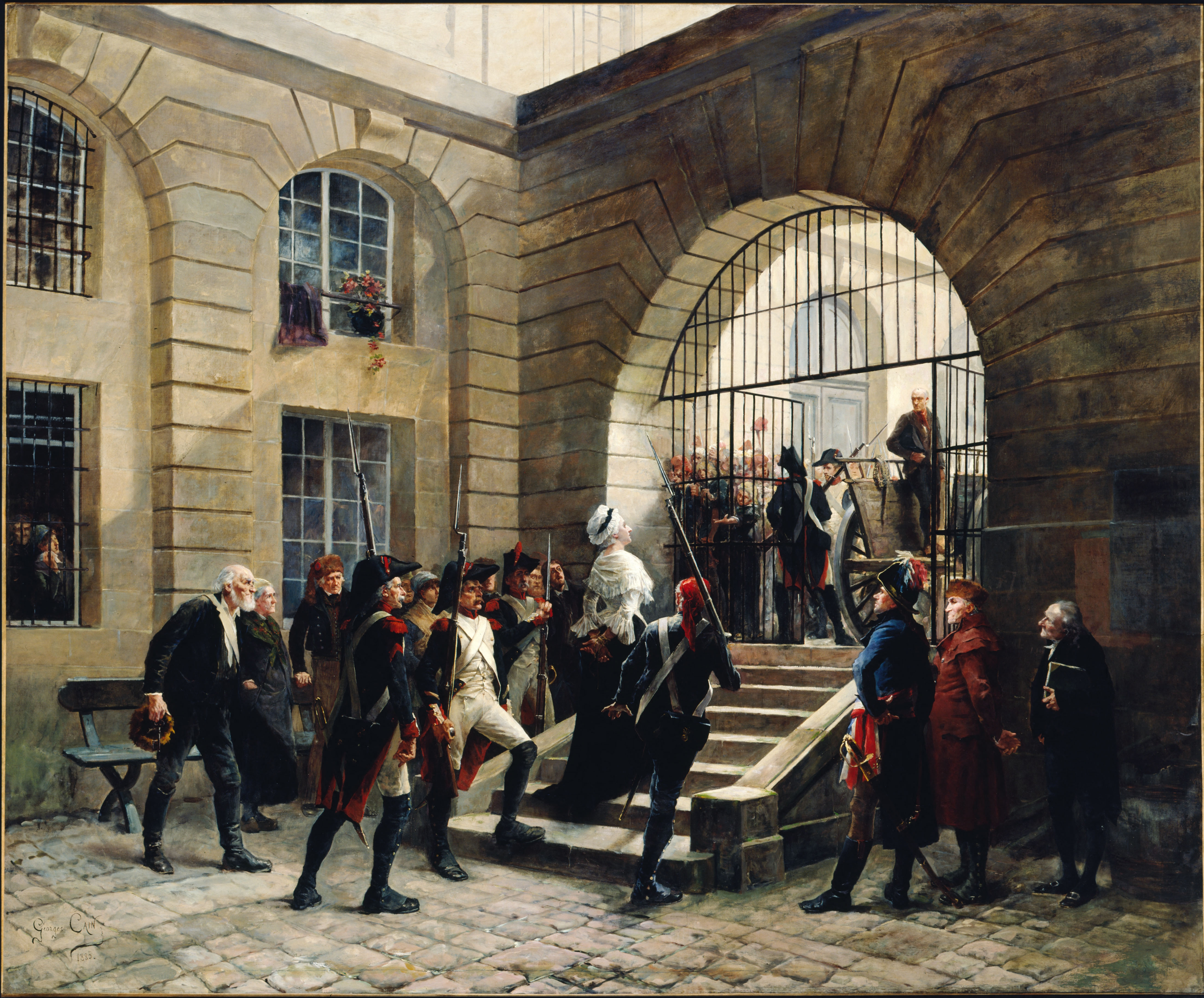
Marie Antoinette leaves the Conciergerie on the way to her execution

The Palais de la Cité and the Conciergerie played a central role in the French Revolution. On May 5, 1788, The Parlement of Paris, meeting in the Great Hall in 1788, refused to accept King Louis XVI's order to turn over two of its members for questioning and refused to leave the building. As the Revolution unfolded, The Parlement itself soon became unpopular. It was dismissed in 1790 by the new Constituent Assembly and the gates of the Palais de la Cité were locked.

The first Paris Commune and Sans-culottes seized the Tuileries Palace on August 10, 1792 and took charge of the government and the Conciergerie. During the September Massacres, the Communard militants entered the city's prisons and in four days killed more than 1300 prisoners, including priests and others suspected of being upper class or hostile to the revolution. The victims included a large group executed in the Women's Courtyard of the Conciergerie on September 2–3, 1792. Of the 488 prisoners in the Conciergerie, 74 women and 36 men were released by the mob and 378 were killed, of whom Marie Gredeler was the only female victim.

The Revolutionary Tribunal was created on March 10, 1793 by the more radical Montagnard faction over the opposition of the more moderate Girondins. The Tribunal met in the Grand Chamber of Palace on the upper floor between the Silver and Caesar towers. It was renamed the "Hall of Liberty." Antoine Quentin Fouquier-Tinville, a Montagnard, was named public prosecutor and installed his office and residence next to the Chamber. In September 1793, the Terror intensified. The National Convention, controlled by the Montagnards, enacted the Law of Suspects on September 17, 1793. This act declared that anyone considered a counter-revolutionary or enemy of the republic was guilty of treason and thus, condemned to death. The Tribunal had five judges and 12 selected jury members. Trials were public and rapid and attracted large crowds. Verdicts could not be appealed. The number of monthly executions grew from 11 a month before the Law of Suspects to 124 per month.

The Queen, Marie Antoinette, was arrested on August 3, 1792 and first held in the Temple Prison with her family. The King was tried between December 3 and December 26, 1792 and executed 21 January 1793. The Queen was transferred from the Temple to the Conciergerie on the night of August 1–2, 1793. She was confined in a single-bed cell on the ground floor overlooking the Women's Courtyard. She was not allowed any writing instruments and was continually watched by two gendarmes. After several unsuccessful plots to free her were discovered, she was transferred to a different cell, where the current memorial chapel is located, and held there for 44 days. She was questioned in her cell on October 12 and was charged with three crimes: collusion with Austria, excessive expenditure and opposing the Revolution. Another charge, having incestuous relations with her son, was added during the trial. Her trial began on October 14, 1793 in the former Great Hall of the Palace. She had two court-appointed lawyers but they were only allowed less than a day to prepare their case. The trial lasted for two days, in which 41 witnesses testified. The trial concluded on 16 October 1793 and she was, as expected, sentenced to death and taken in a cart later that day to the guillotine, set up on Place de la Revolution, now Place de la Concorde.

During the period of 1793–94 at the height of the Reign of Terror, the prison held some 600 prisoners. Most were transferred to the Conciergerie from other prisons and spent only a few days before their trial and sentencing, or at most a few weeks. Political and criminal prisoners were mixed together. Poorer prisoners were confined in collective cells on the lowest level with straw-covered floors. These prisoners were called "Pailleaux", or "Straw sleepers." Others were confined to a square cell six feet wide and six feet long, with a narrow barred window. A small number of wealthier prisoners were able to bribe guards to have cells with two folding beds. These prisoners could send and receive mail, have their clothes washed and sometime have visitors. These prisoners were called "Pistoliers," because they bribed the guards with pistole coins. However, these privileges ceased as the prison became more crowded and the Terror reached its peak.

In the spring of 1794, the tribunal began judging the moderate revolutionary leaders, including Danton and Camille Desmoulins. In May they tried and sentenced Élisabeth of France, sister of Louis XVI, "For belonging to the Family of the Tyrant." On June 10, 1794, the court procedure was modified to allow speedier trials, witnesses were no longer needed and the definition of "suspect" was enlarged. By the end of June, an average of 38 persons a day were being tried, sentenced and sent to the guillotine. Between 1793 and 1795, two-thirds of prisoners tried were sentenced to death. At the peak of the Reign of Terror, four out of five prisoners were sentenced to death,

By the end of July 1794, the more moderate revolutionaries, fearing their own safety, turned against Robespierre and the other radical leaders. On July 27, a majority of the Convention voted for the arrest of Robespierre. Robespierre tried to commit suicide, was wounded and then taken to the Conciergerie, where he was given the former cell of Marie Antoinette. On July 28 he was condemned to death by the Tribunal and guillotined on the Place de la Revolution.

In August, the head of the tribunal, Fouquier-Tinville, was arrested and tried. He argued that "the execution of the laws, justice and humanity were always my sole rules of conduct" but he was confined for nine months in the Conciergerie and went to the guillotine on May 7, 1795. The tribunal was abolished on May 31, 1795. In 780 days, the tribunal had sentenced and executed 2,780 prisoners.

The early revolutionary period continued the prison's tradition of interning prisoners based on wealth, such that wealthier prisoners could rent a bed for 27 livres 12 sous for the first month, 22 livres 10 sous for subsequent months. Even when the price was decreased to 15 livres, the commanders of the prison made a fortune and as the Terror escalated, a prisoner could pay for a bed and be executed a few days later, freeing the bed for a new inmate who would then pay as well. One memoirist termed the Conciergerie "the most lucrative furnished lodgings in Paris". For most prisoners, the cramped cells were infested with rats, and the stench of urine permeated every room. As the Terror reached its peak, the special privileges for wealthy prisoners were largely reduced and ceased.

The prisoners, except those locked in the dungeons, were allowed to walk about the prisoners' gallery from 8 a.m. to an hour before sunset. Roll call was always a tortuous proceeding because many of the jailers were illiterate and it could take hours for them to confirm that all of the prisoners were accounted for. A principal jailer, who sat by the door, determined whether visitors would be allowed inside the prison. His decision depended more on his mood than any set proceedings. He was also in charge of resolving disputes between jailers and their charges.

Each evening, the prisoners gathered in the courtyard outside the Tour Bonbec to hear the reading of the list of prisoners who would be tried the following day. Once prisoners were tried and sentenced, they were taken to Salle de la Toilette, where their personal belongings were confiscated. They were put onto carts in the May Courtyard and taken to guillotines at sites throughout Paris. Some of the prisoners held at the Conciergerie were the poet André Chénier, Charlotte Corday, Madame Élisabeth, Madame du Barry and the 21 Girondins, a group of moderate deputies, arrested and executed in the early beginning of the Reign of Terror.

== 19th century to present ==
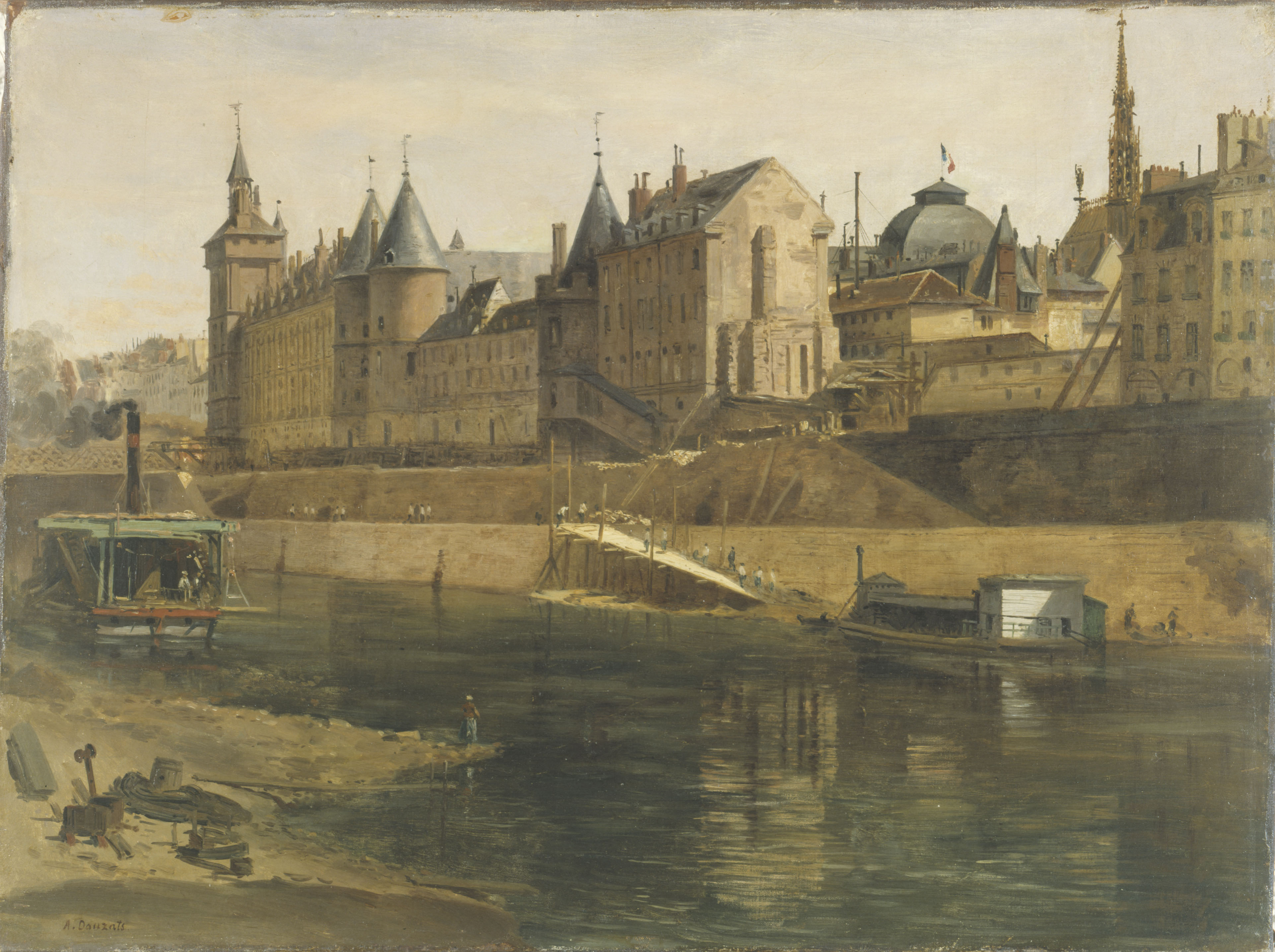
Conciergerie under reconstruction - 1857–58 (Musée Carnavalet)

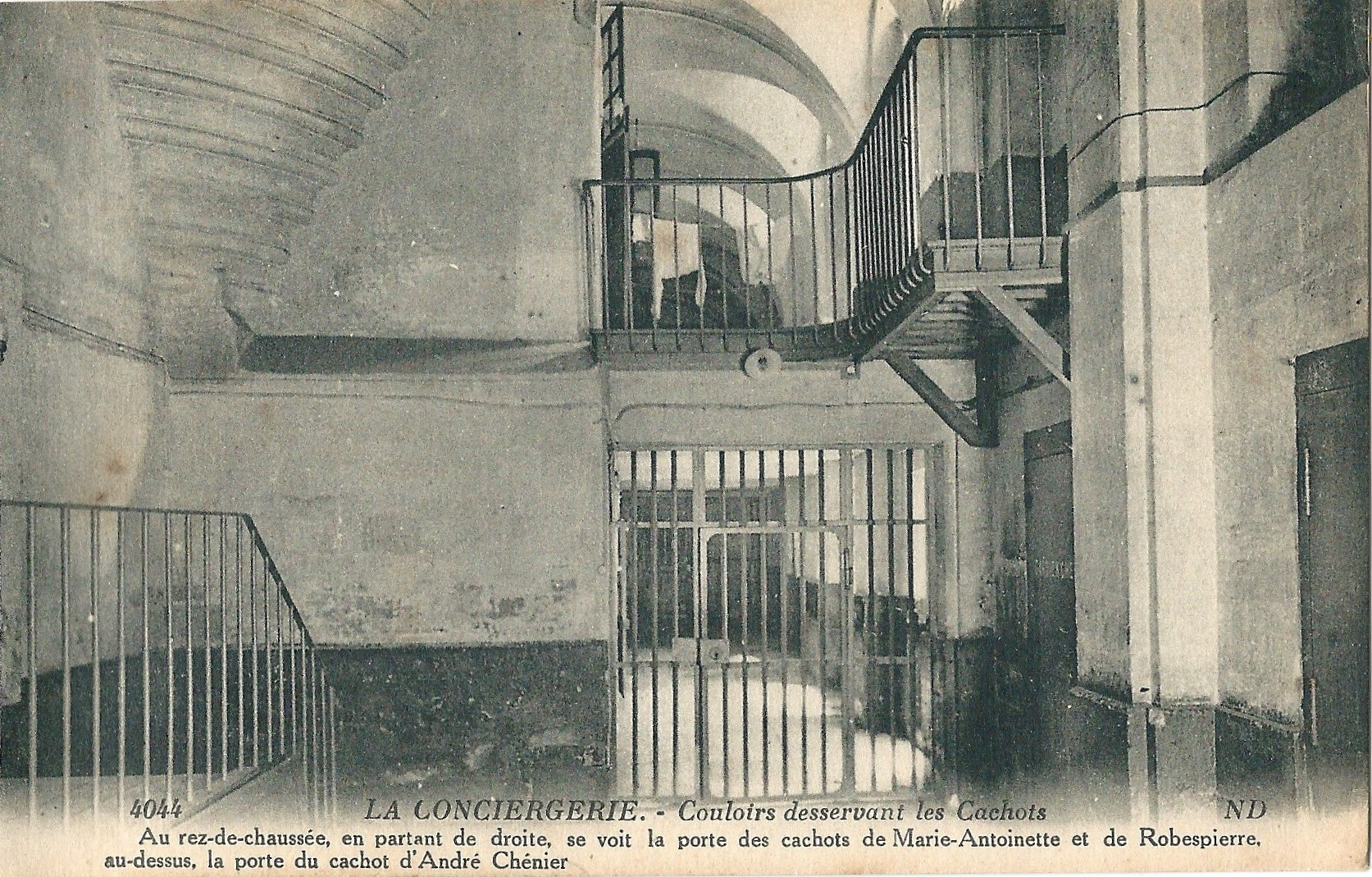
Interior of Conciergerie in 1936

After the Restoration of the Bourbons in 1814 and again in 1815, after the Hundred Days reign of Napoleon Bonaparte, the Conciergerie returned to its role as a courthouse and prison. Its prisoners included Marshal Ney, one of Napoleon's Generals, who was sentenced there for breaking an oath to King Louis XVIII and joining Napoleon's during the Hundred Days; Georges Cadoudal, leader of the Chouannerie Breton royalist uprising, and the anarchist Ravachol. Later prisoners included the future Napoleon III, who was tried there in 1840 after a failed attempt to seize power, and sentenced to prison for life in the prison of Ham, from which he escaped.

Beginning in 1812, the palace and portions of the Conciergerie were restored and rebuilt by architect A.M. Peyrle. His additions included the memorial chapel to Marie Antoinette. In 1847, work began on an enlarged Palace of Justice, with a new Court of Summary Jurisdiction placed between the Silver Tower and the Tour Bombec. In 1862 the Conciergerie was granted the status of an historical monument, though it still continued to be used as a prison. Between 1847 and 1871 the architects Joseph-Louis Duc and Étienne Thédore Dommey built a new façade for the Ministry of Justice, facing the Boulevard du Palais; built a new building for the Correctional Police; reconstructed the historic Salle des Pas-Perdus and restored the clock tower, and built a new building next to the Conciergerie for the Cour de Cassation. At the same time they went to work restoring the medieval halls of the Conciergerie, and in 1870 raised the height of the clock tower. Their work was interrupted by the uprising of the Paris Commune in 1871. In the final days of the Commune, the Communards set fire to the new Palais de Justice, badly damaging the interiors. Restoration and reconstruction lasted for another twenty years. The palace was finally completed with the finishing of the Tribunal correctionnel between 1904 and 1914. Some sections of the Conciergerie were opened to tourist visits in 1914. The prison continued to function until 1934, when it was definitively closed.

The prison was one of the backdrops for the 2024 Summer Olympics opening ceremony, with a tableau that referenced the beheading of Marie Antoinette and the Reign of Terror, with performances by metal band Gojira and opera singer Marina Viotti.

== Description ==
=== The Towers and facades ===
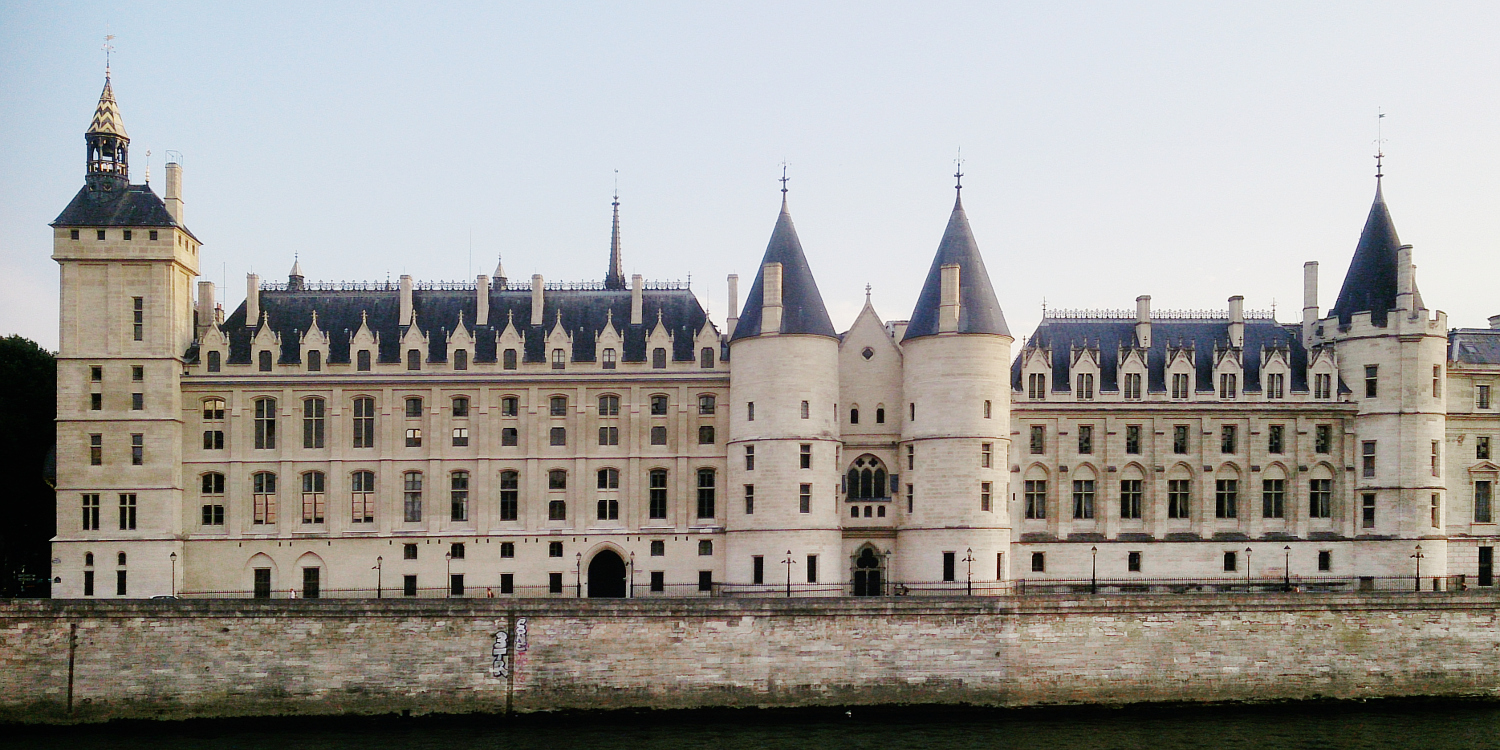
North facade of the Conciergerie: Horloge (left); Caesar and Silver (center); Tour Bonbec (right)

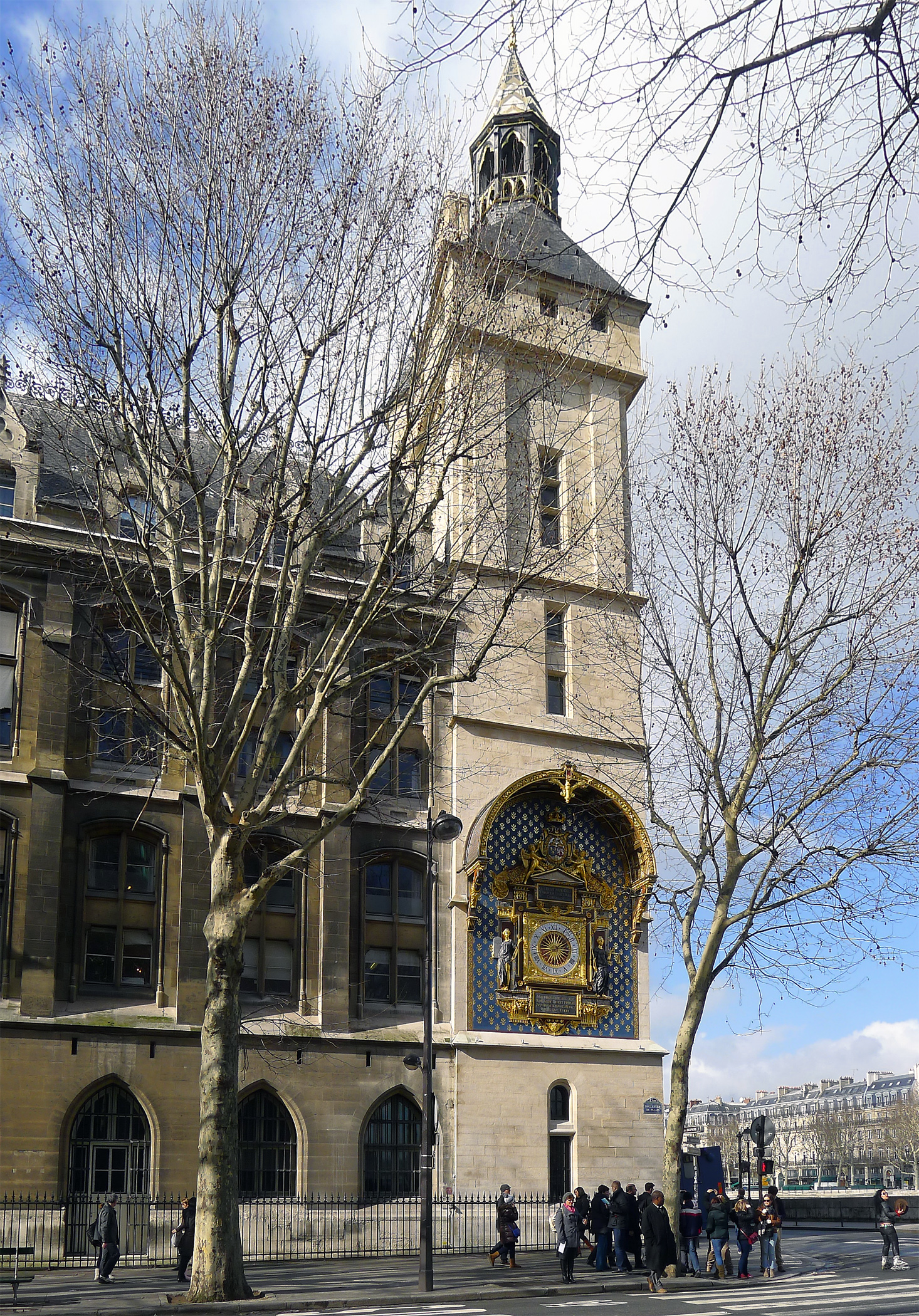
The Tour de l'Horloge, or clock tower (14th and 16th century)

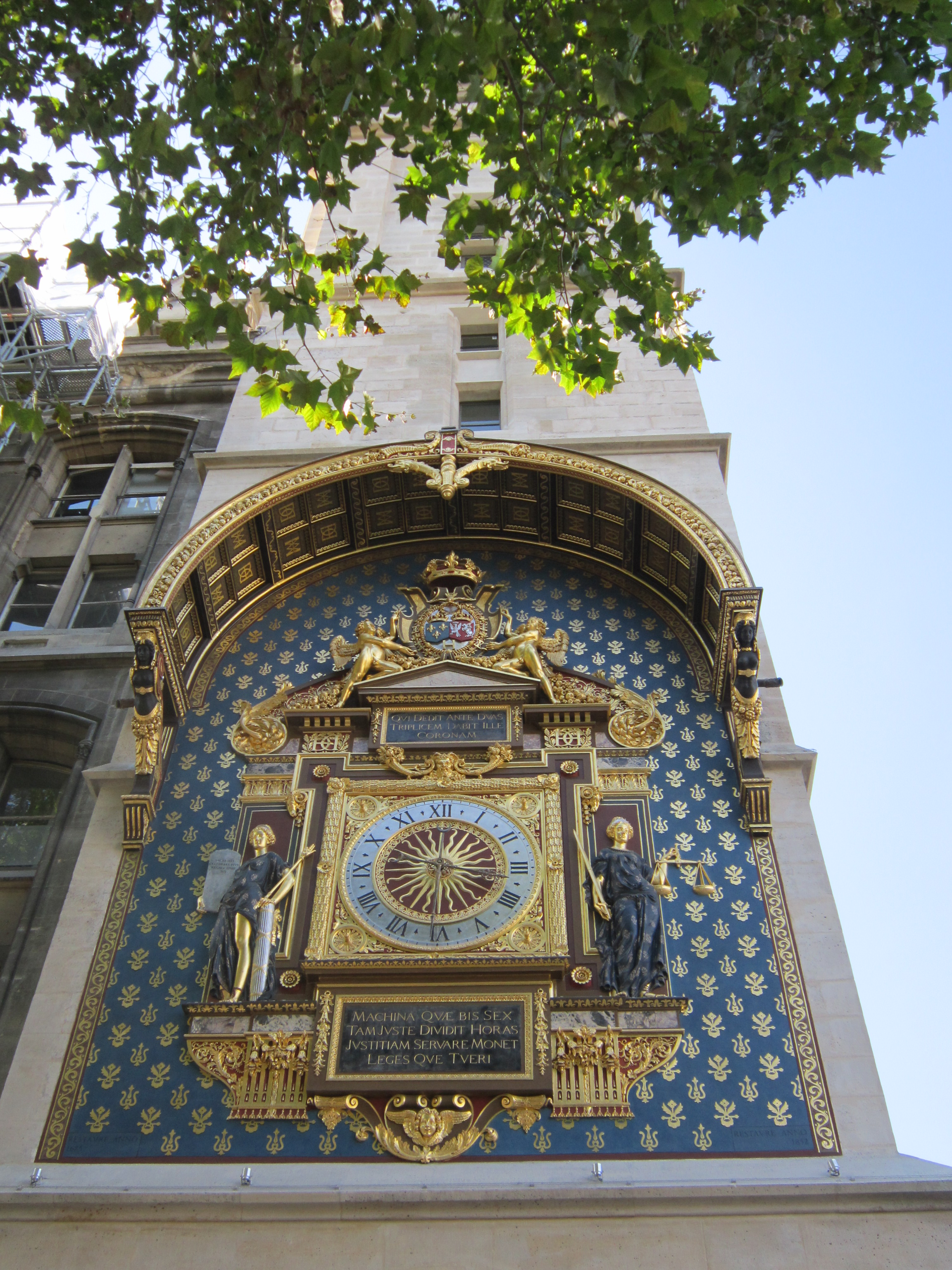
The clock on the Tour de l'Horloge (14th century)

The four medieval towers of the north façade, along the Quai de l'Horloge between the Cour de Cassation and the Boulevard du Palais, are the most prominent exterior vestiges of the old Conciergerie.

The Tour Bonbec is a circular tower with battlements and a conical slate roof located at the west end of the Conciergerie, next to the Cour de Cassation. It is the oldest of the towers, constructed in the 13th century under Louis IX. It was originally one level shorter than the other towers, but in the 19th century, under Napoleon III, it was raised to its present height and form. The name of the tower comes from "Bon Bec," a slang word for a "Good talker". It is reference to the torture chamber, which during the Reign of Terror was located in this tower; it referred to those prisoners who spoke freely under torture.

The gateway on the north is flanked by two circular towers with conical roofs, but without battlements. The Caesar Tower, on the left facing the building, is named in honor of the Roman Emperors, particularly Julius Caesar who visited the island during the Gallic Wars to meet with the leaders of the Gallic tribes, and the later Emperors and Roman governors who lived on the island. The two towers were constructed in the early 14th century by Philippe IV. Later in the 14th century, the lower portions of the towers were connected to the prison of the Conciergerie, and were used as dungeons until the French Revolution. The Silver Tower on the right was used to store part of the royal treasury. After the court moved to Versailles, The upper parts of the two towers were attached to the Grand Chamber of the Parlement, and were used to store the civil and criminal registries of the kingdom. In 1793–94, at the height of the Terror, the chief prosecutor of the Revolutionary Tribunal, Antoine Fouquier-Tinville, had his offices in the two towers, close to the courtroom of the Tribunal.

The most recent tower is the Tour de l'Horloge, or clock tower, at the corner of the Boulevard du Palais and the Quai de l'Horloge. It was completed by John II of France, and finished in 1350. It is the tallest tower of the Conciergerie, five levels high, with battlements and a lantern tower at the top; it served as both a watchtower and clock tower. The clock was made by Henri de Vic and installed during the reign of Charles V of France, and was the first public clock in Paris. In 1585 King Henry III of France embellished the clock with a new face, set on a blue background with gold fleurs-de-lis, and framed by statues of law and justice by sculptor Germain Pilon. The decoration was vandalised during the Revolution, and the large bell in the lantern, which was rung to celebrate major events, was taken out and melted down. The tower had been restored several times, most recently in 2012.

The current façades were built later than the towers. The north façade between the towers was built in the 19th century in Gothic Revival style. The eastern section, around the entrance, was built during the Bourbon Restoration in the early 19th century, while the western section was built by Joseph-Louis Duc and Étienne Théodore Dommey in the second half of the 19th century, under Emperor Napoleon III. They were almost completed in 1871, when the Paris Commune took charge of the city. The Communards set the building on fire in the last days of the Commune, badly damaging the interiors, but it was rebuilt in the late 19th century.

=== The Hall of the Men-at-Arms and the "Rue de Paris" ===
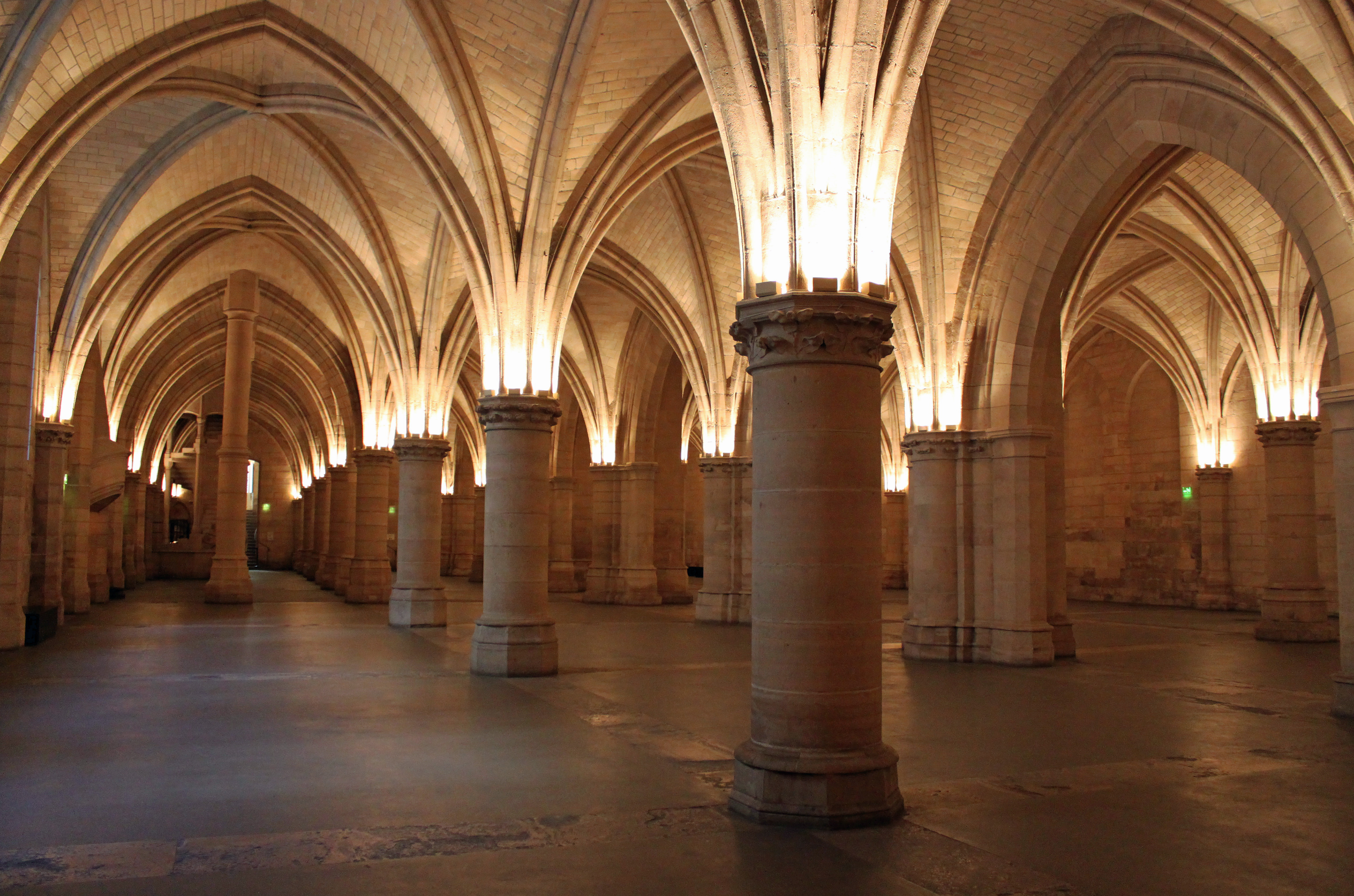
Hall of the Men-at-arms

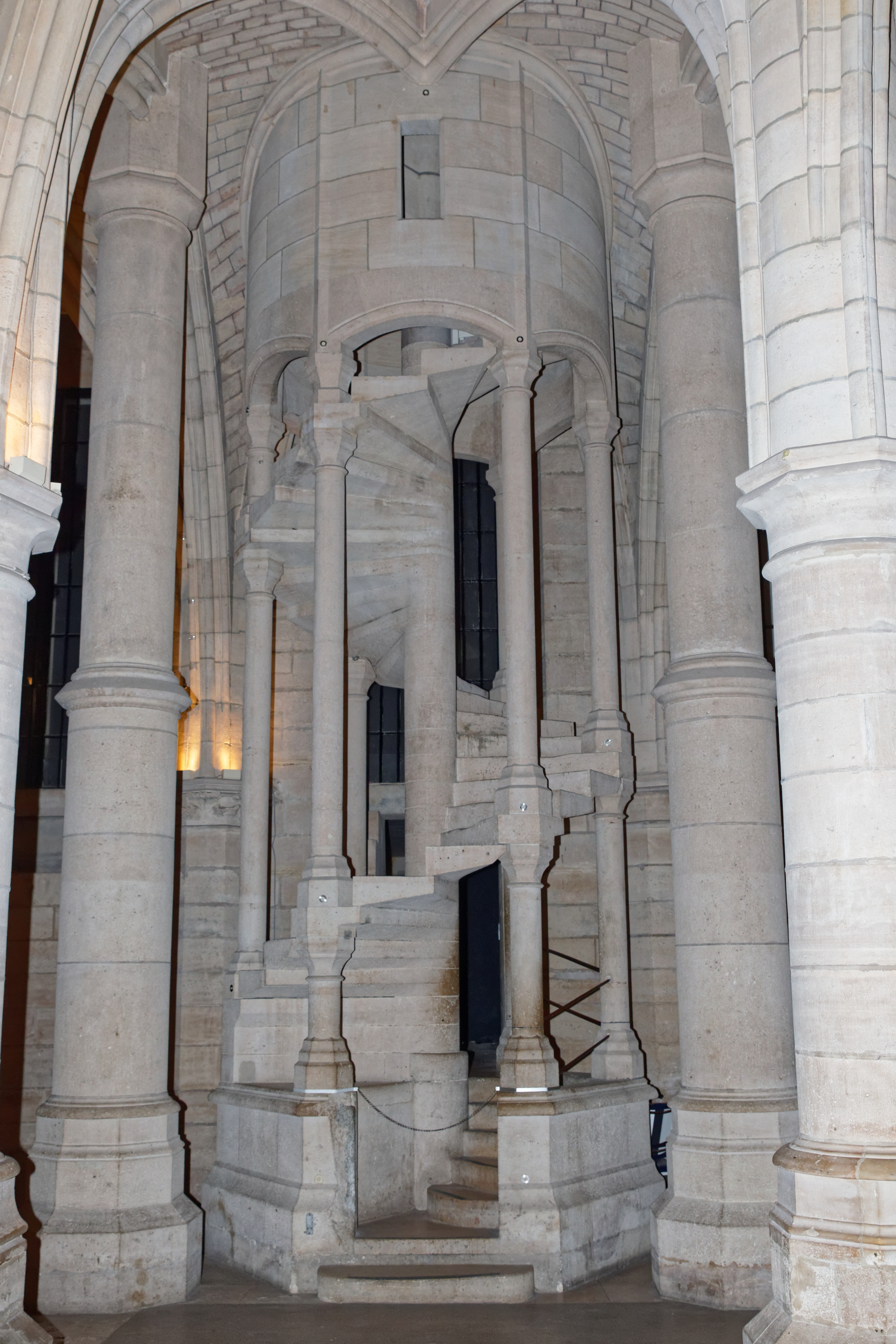
Spiral stairway from the Hall of the Men-at-Arms to the Great Hall above

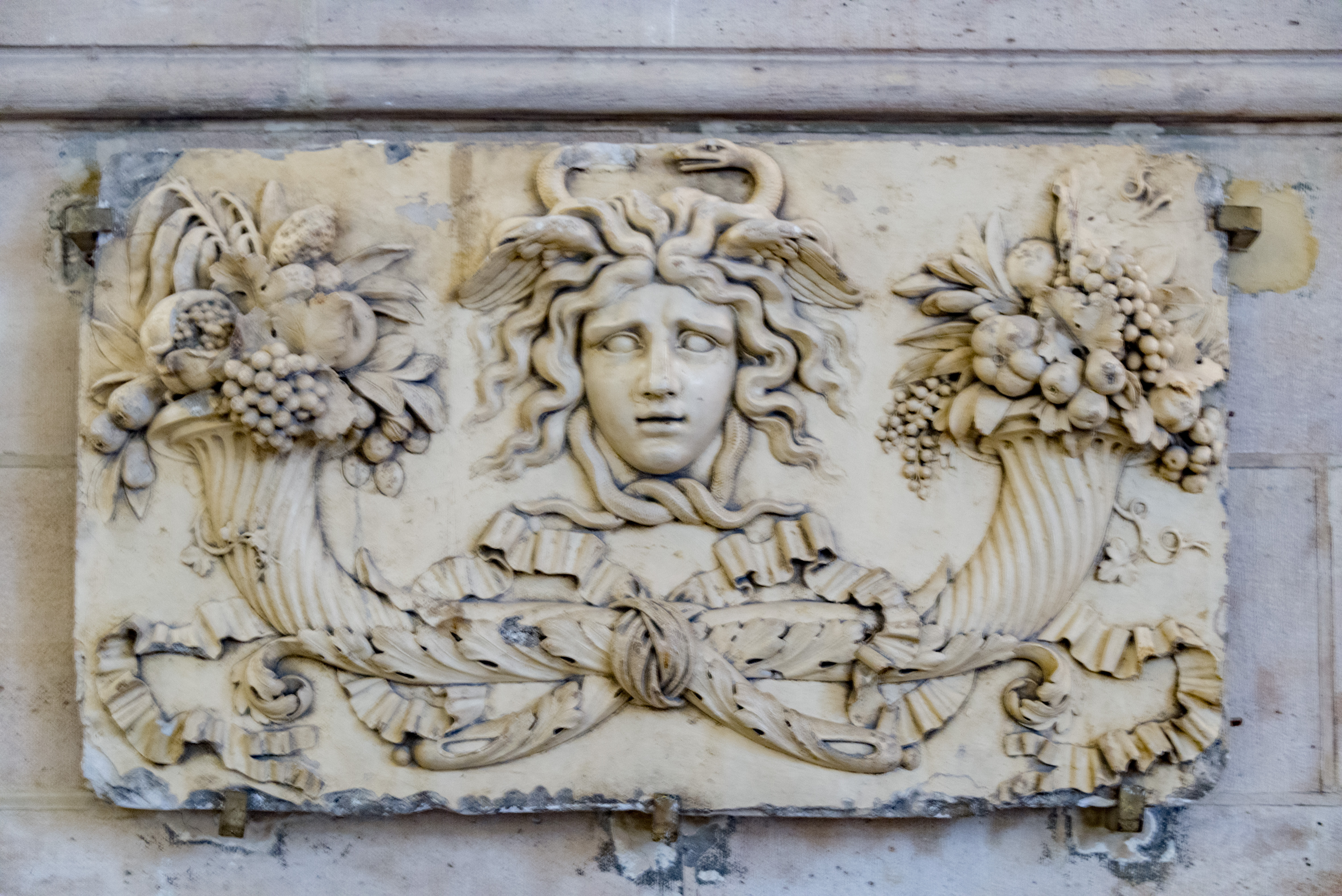
Fragment of the early decoration

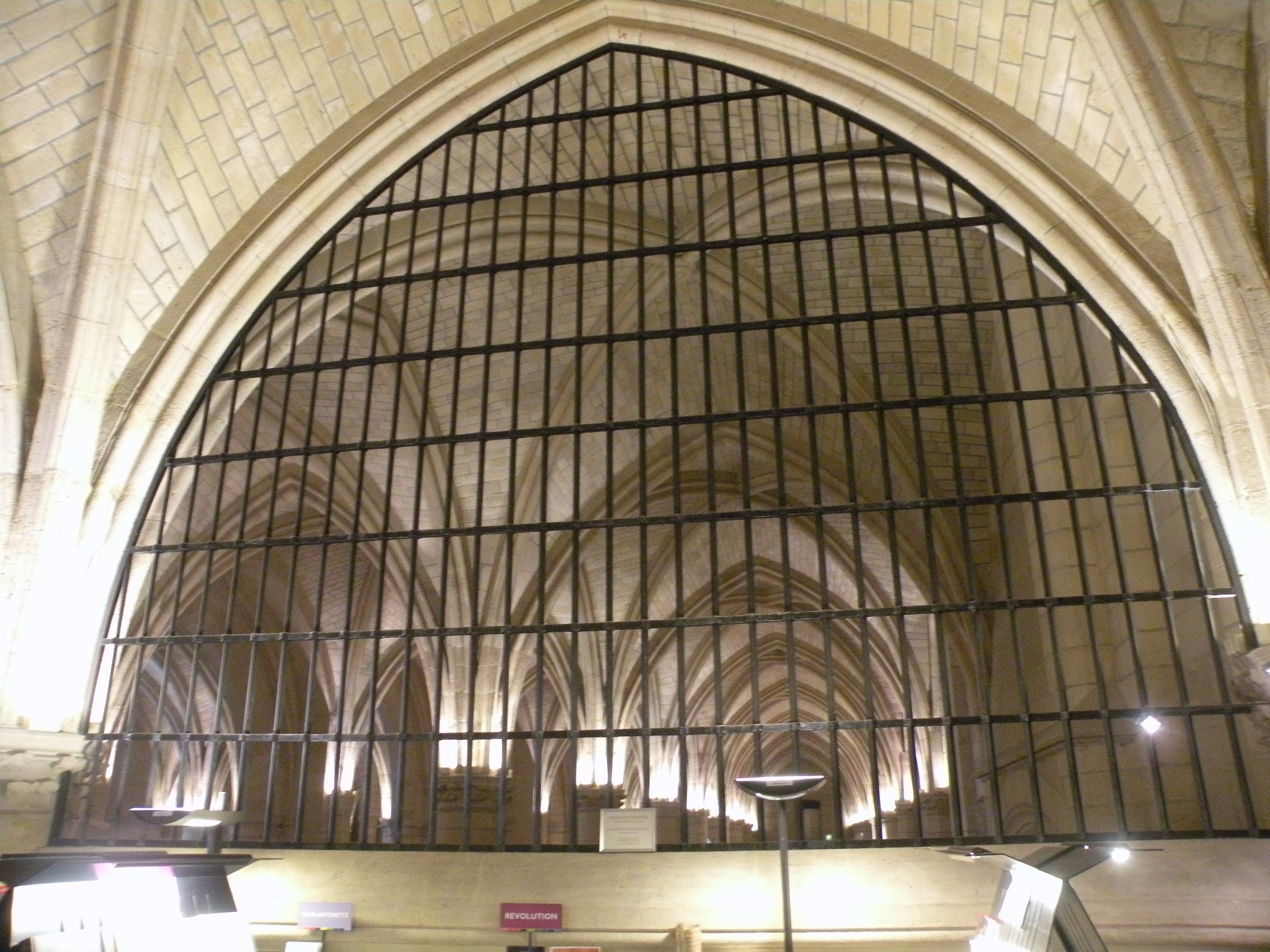
The "Rue de Paris" passage through the prison

The Hall of the Men-at-Arms (Salle des Gens d'Armes) was built in early 14th century by Philip IV on the ground floor. Its great size (originally 68 m (223 ft 1 in) long, now 61.2 m (200 ft 9 in), 28 m (91 ft 10 in) wide, and 8.7 m (28 ft 7 in) high to the vault), makes it the largest non-religious Gothic hall in Europe. It served as a dining room and gathering place for the armed guards and servants attached to the palace, who numbered between one and two thousand persons. During the reign of Philip IV parts of the hall were sometimes used for the meetings of special commissions appointed by the King to investigate problems in the royal institutions in the French provinces. These parts would be separated from the rest of the hall by partitions or tapestries during the meetings.

The hall particularly provided staff and services for the Great Hall, located directly above it on the first floor. The lower hall was connected with upper hall by spiral staircases; part of one stairway is still in place. The hall was divided into four naves by a row of massive pillars in the center, flanked by two rows of cylindrical columns. Heat was provided by four large fireplaces around the hall. Thanks to the support of the columns and pillars, the hall originally had large windows, which were mostly sealed off in the 17th century when the Galerie Dauphine was built, though traces of them are still visible on the south wall.

In 1364, when Charles V left the palace, the hall was modified for its new prison functions. the last bay on the west was raised in height and separated by bars from the rest of the hall. This became the "Rue de Paris", the secure route to the prison cells, named after "Monsieur de Paris", the nickname of the city's executioner.

=== Hall of the Guards ===
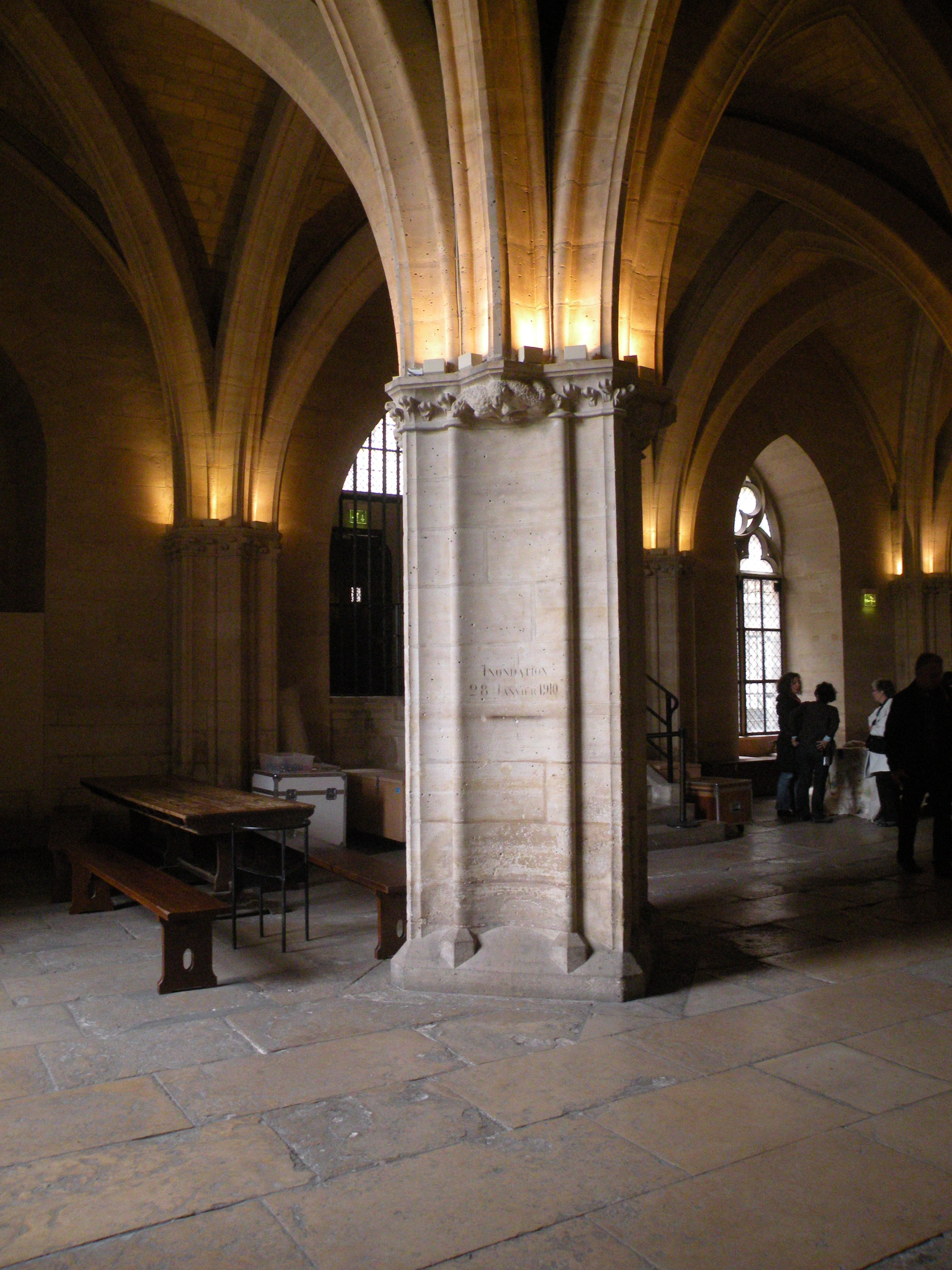
Hall of the Guards

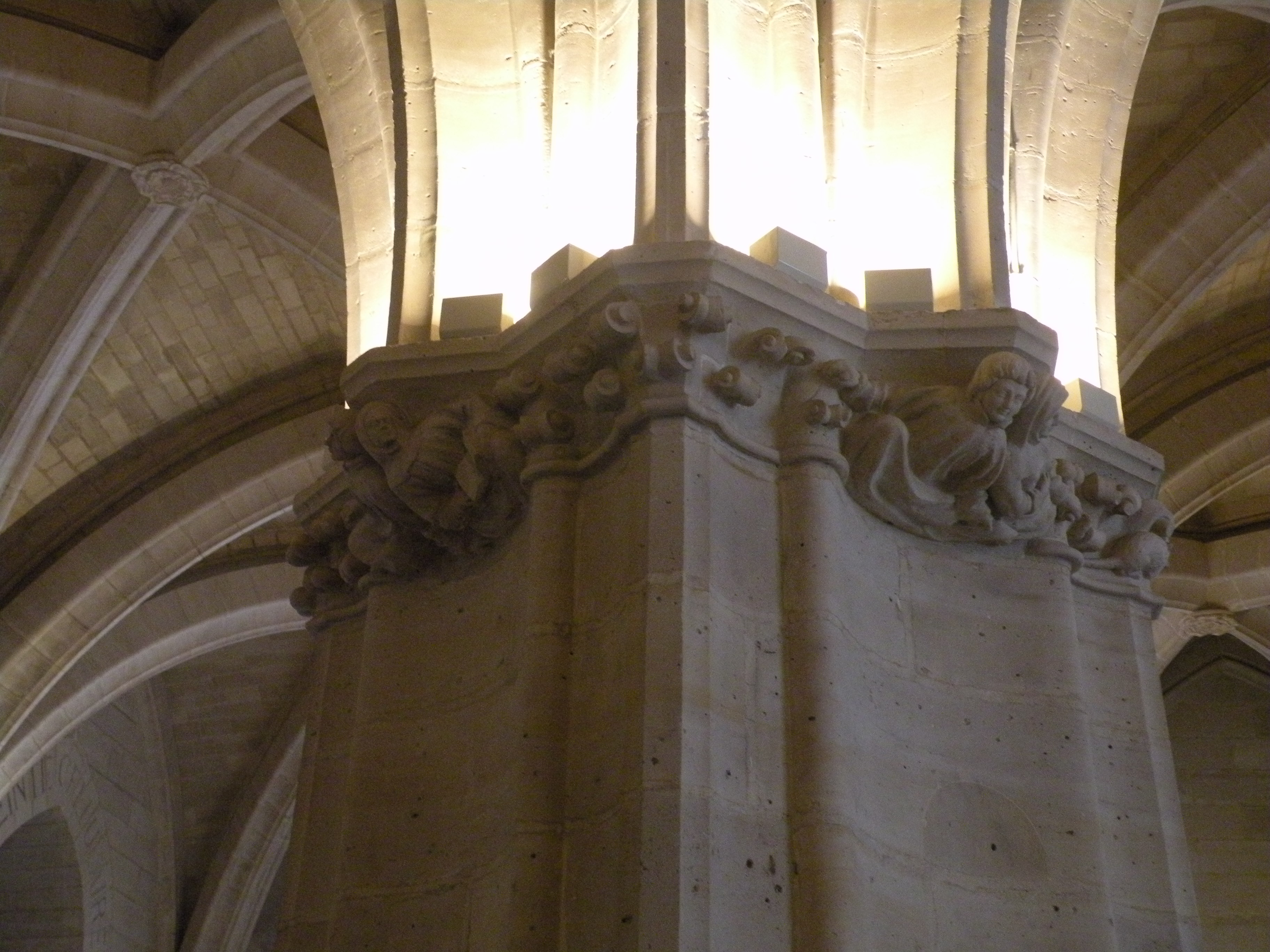
Sculptural decoration of Hall of the Guards (19th c.)

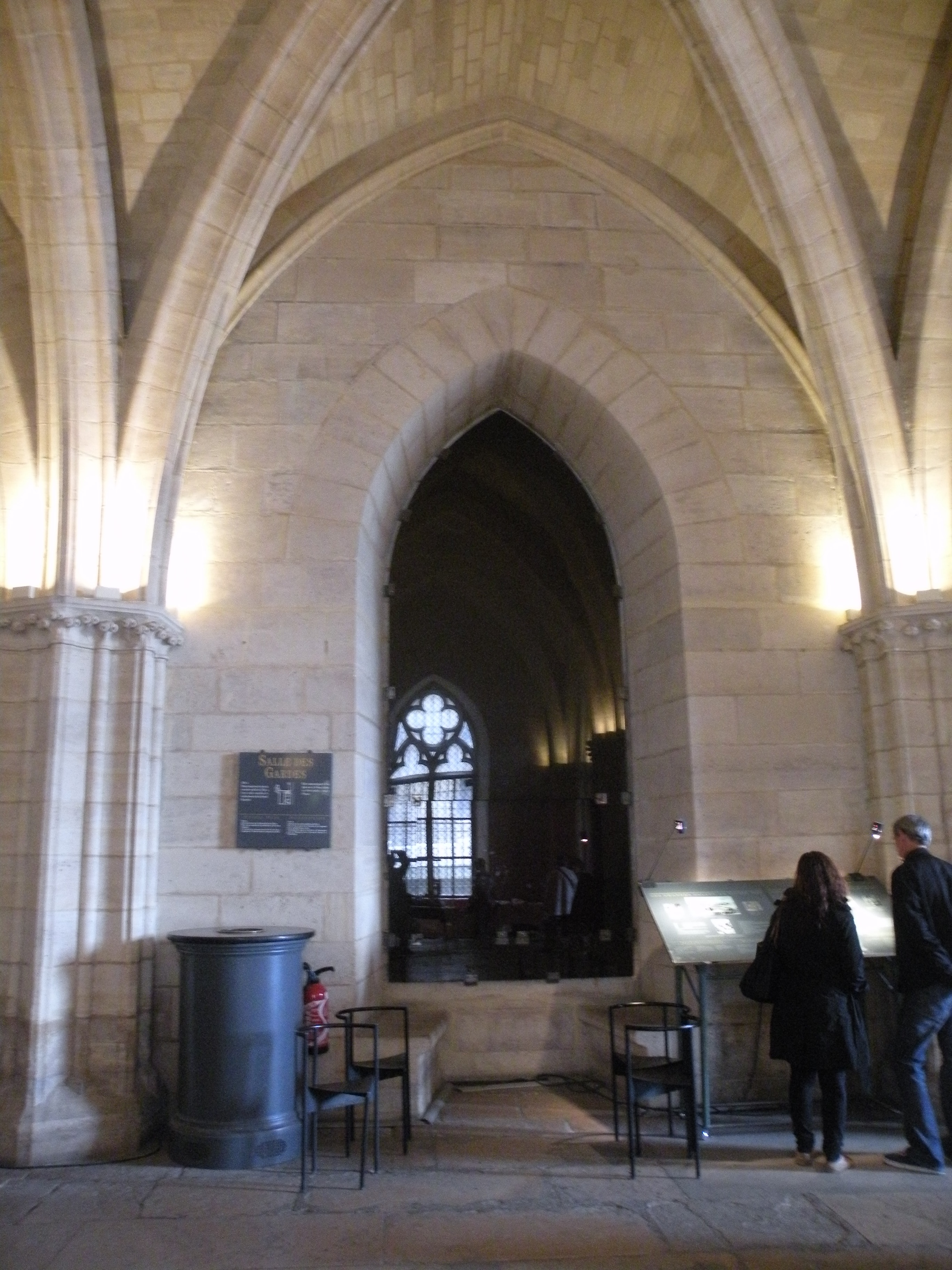
Hall of the Guards

The Hall of the Guards (Salle des Gardes) was built by Philip IV at the same time as the Hall of the Men-at-Arms, in the early 14th century. It is on the north or the old palace, between the Tower of Caesar and Silver Tower and the Seine, and the private garden of the King on the west. It was first occupied by The Royal Guard, and later was used as the antechamber of the Parliament, which was located directly above. It is smaller than the Hall of the Men-art-Arms, 21.8 m (71 ft 6 in) long, 11.7 m (38 ft 5 in) wide, and 8.3 m (27 ft 3 in) high. The rib-vaulted roof, supported by three massive pillars, divides it into two naves. Like the hall of the Men-at-Arms, it was connected with the room above by a spiral stairway.

When King Charles V moved the royal residence from the City Palace to the Louvre, the Hall of the Guards was converted into a prison. It was divided into dungeons for destitute prisoners. called "pailleux" or "Straw-sleepers", who were fed with only bread and water, and slept on the floor. It was usually overcrowded, with prisoners sometimes required to sleep in shifts. From 1780 onwards, male prisoners were able to get some exercise in the neighbouring courtyard. During the Reign of Terror, the Hall was used to confine prisoners before their trials in the courtroom of the Revolutionary Tribunal, in the hall above. The cells became so crowded that a second level, built of wood and accessed by ladders, was put into place. The Hall was restored in the 19th century by architect Antoine Marie Peyrle, who added some decorative details, including sculpture on the capitals of the columns.

=== Kitchen ===
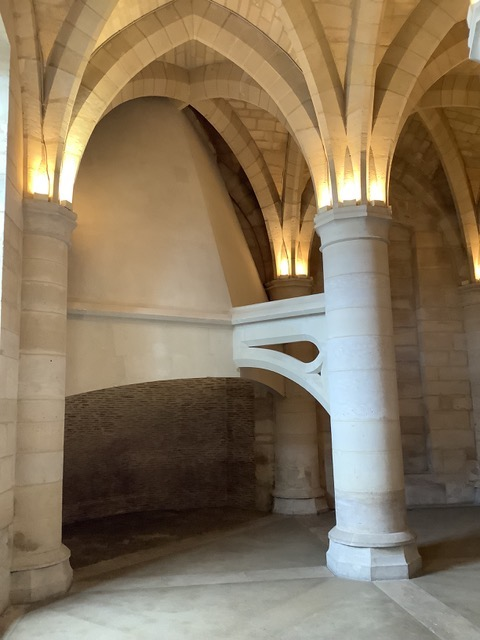
Fireplace in the kitchen pavilion

The kitchen pavilion was added in about 1353, shortly after the other large halls. Placed in the northwest corner, it was set slightly apart from the rest of the building, to reduce the risk of fire. It was originally installed on two levels, with the food of the royal family and guests prepared on the upper level, and for the staff on the lower level. When the king was in residence, meals were prepared in a large hearth on the upper floor, or prepared in the lower kitchen and taken upstairs on an outside ramp, no longer extant. The kitchen originally had eight large windows, but all but two were walled up after it became a prison. Sometimes both the upper and lower kitchens were employed for an event, such as the Banquet of the Three Kings on 6 January 1378, held by Charles V to welcome his uncle, Charles IV, Holy Roman Emperor, and his cousin Wenceslaus, King of the Romans. The upstairs and downstairs kitchens worked together to prepare a banquet of three courses with ten dishes in each course, served in the Grand Hall to the royal guests and to eight hundred German and French knights.

=== Prisoners' Corridor ===
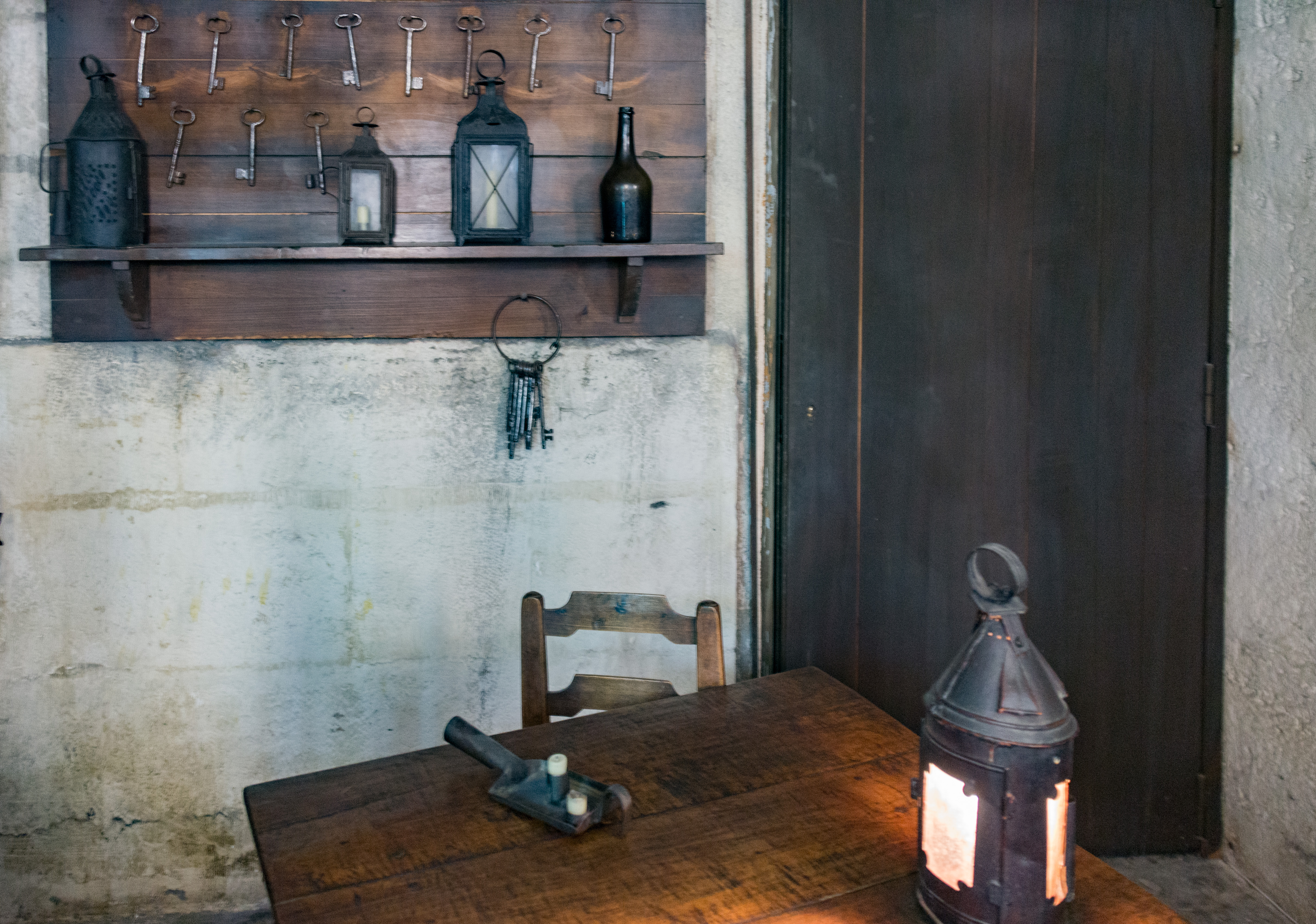
Office of the concierge, or guardian

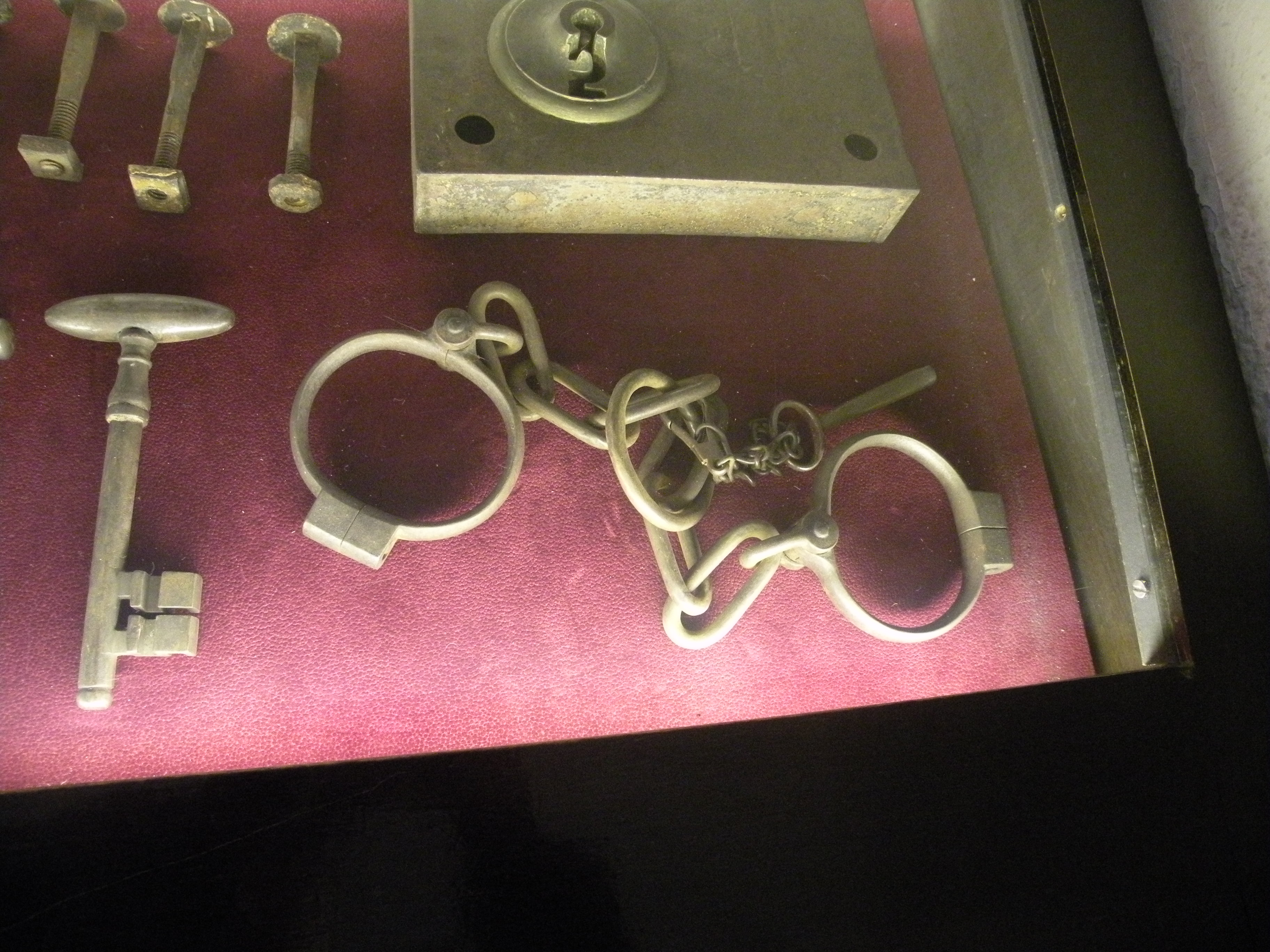
Display of locks, keys and handcuffs

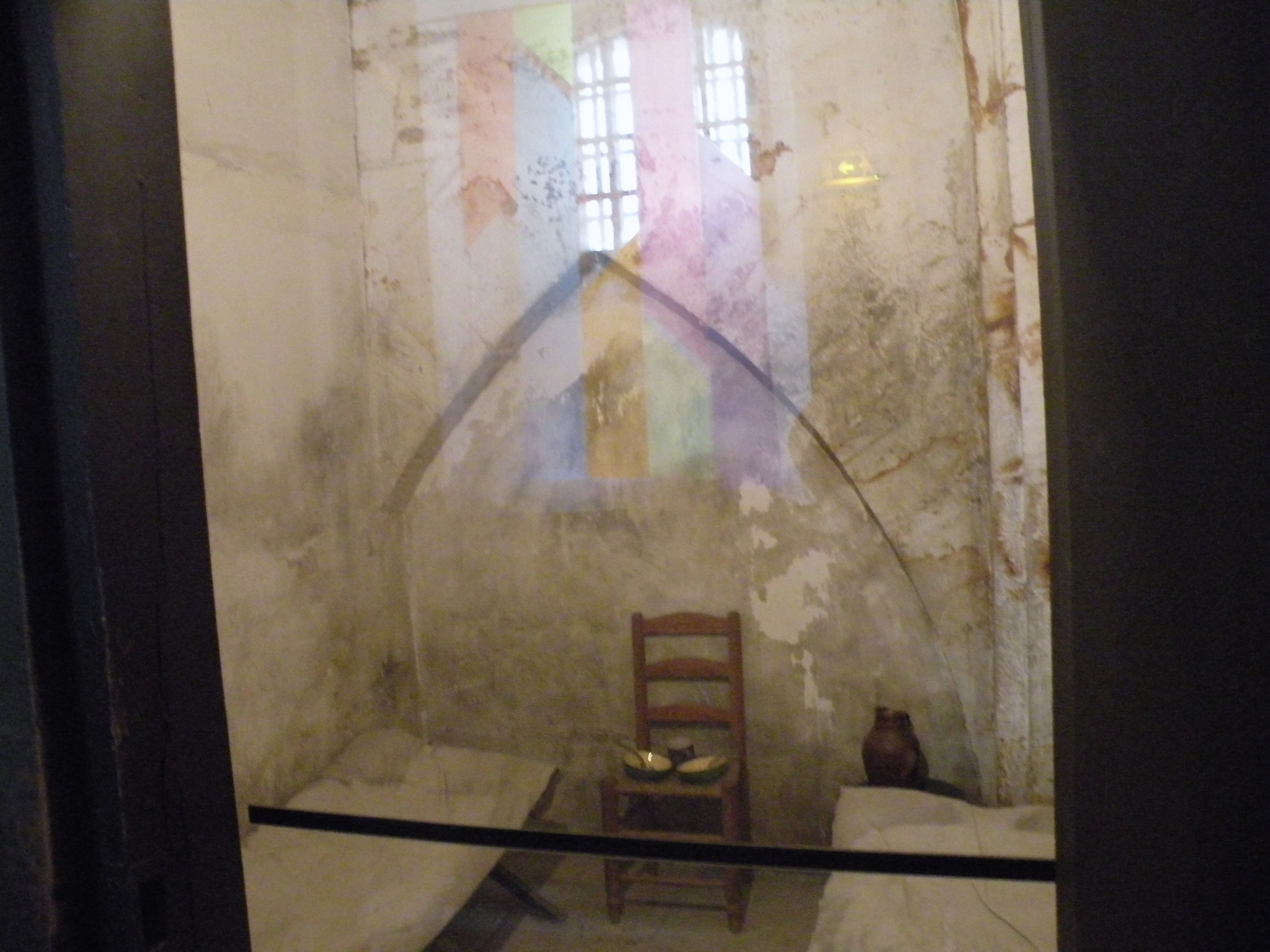
A cell for prisoners who could pay for their bed and board

The upper level of the Conciergerie was considerably rebuilt in the 19th and 20th century. Nearly all of the original cells, including that of Marie Antoinette, were demolished and replaced with new rooms. After the prison was closed and became a museum, some of the new rooms were turned into galleries. In 1989 three rooms were recreated to depict the administrative function of the prison. The first is the cell-like office of the registrar who received the incoming prisoners, enter their names into a large book, and take their belongings. This office was originally located on the ground floor, near the Cour du Mai, the main entrance of prison, where prisoners arrived. Prisoners were then taken to their cells along the Prisoner's Corridor, which extended the length of the building. Next to the recreated registrar's office is a recreation of the office of the Concierge, the warden of the prison. The third recreated room is the Grooming Room, where prisoners were taken on the day of their execution. They undressed and put on a special collarless tunic, and their hair was cut to make easier the passage of the guillotine blade through their neck.

In addition to these rooms, the corridor has three recreations of prison cells, and four rooms displaying objects and documents illustrating the history of the building and the major events of Revolution.

=== Hall of Names and Prisoner's Chapel ===
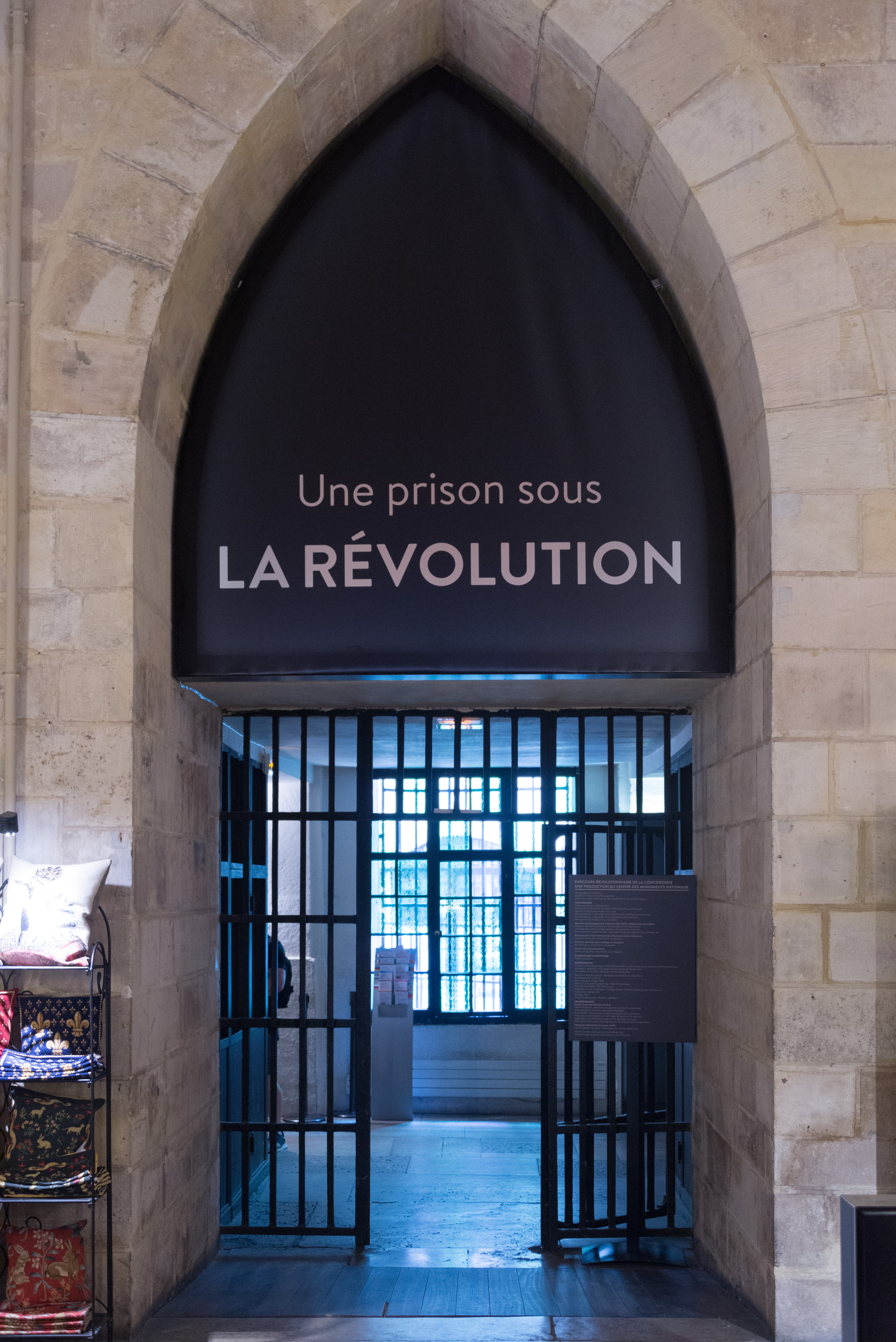
A recreated cell used as an exhibit hall

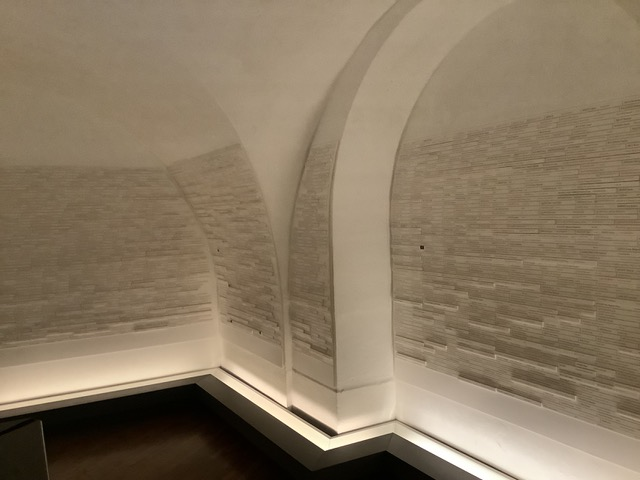
Hall of Names; attached to the walls are the names of the more than four thousand persons sentenced to death by the Revolutionary Tribunal

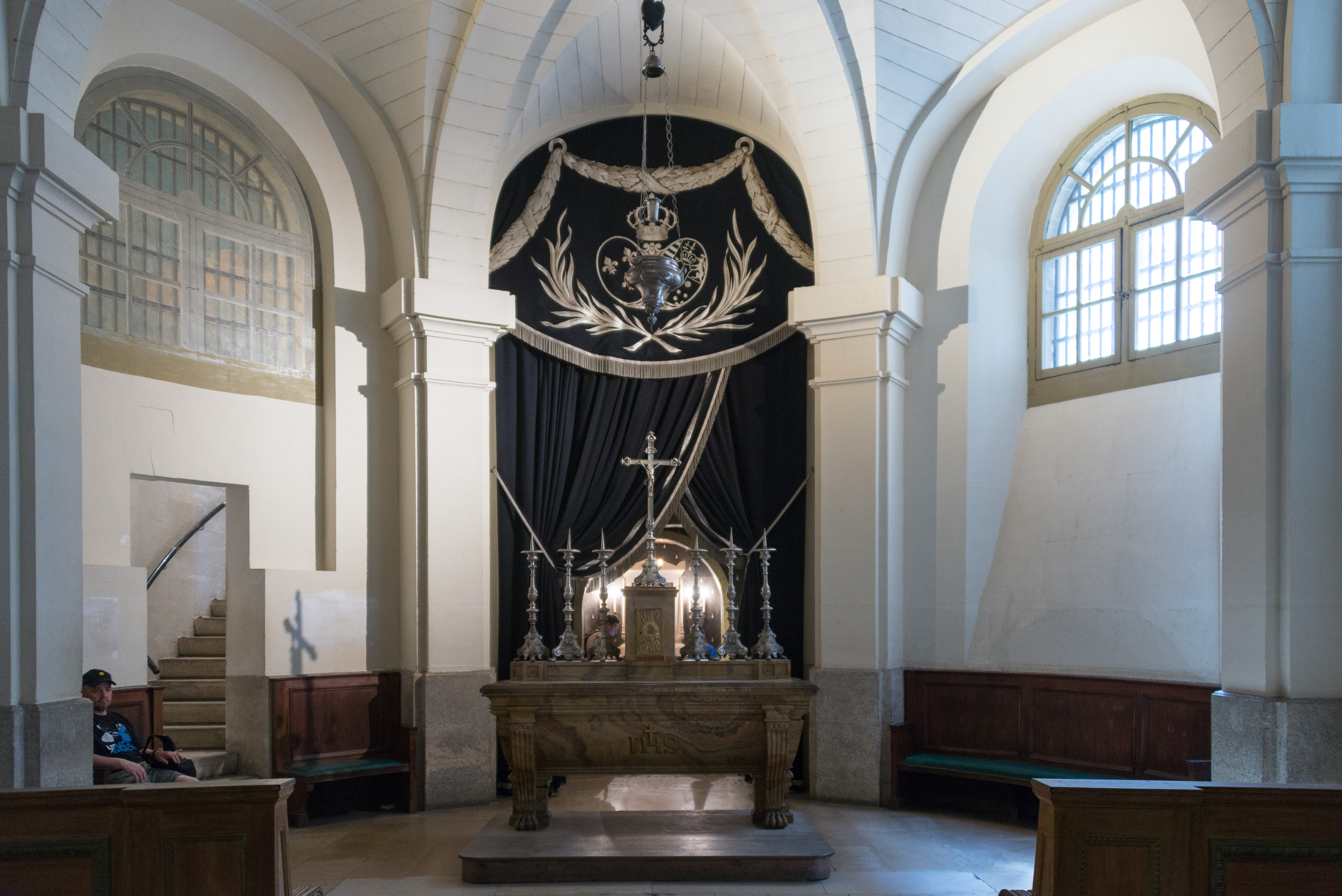
Altar of the Prisoner's Chapel of the Conciergerie. Behind the curtain is the Memorial chapel to Marie Antoinette.

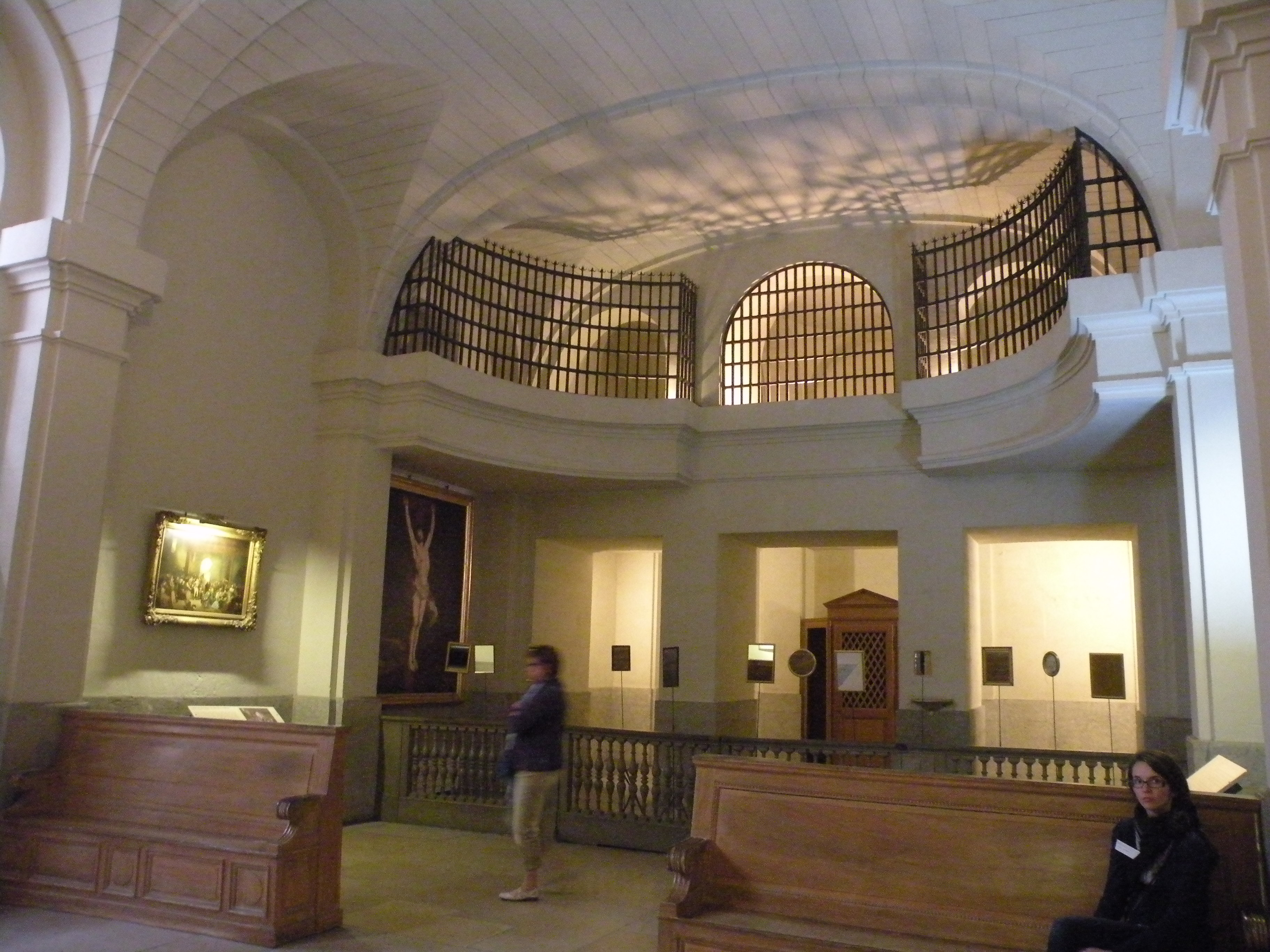
Women's Gallery in the Chapel of the Conciergerie

The Hall of Names has walls covered with the names of more than four thousand persons who were tried and sentenced to death by the Revolutionary Tribunal. Most of the prisoners came from middle or lower class, though twenty percent were from the former nobility and clergy. Between spring 1793 and 1794, nearly half the prisoners tried by the Tribunal left the prison alive, but that number dropped to only twenty percent between spring 1793 and 1794, the period of the Reign of Terror. Visitors can use a touch screen to consult the biographies of fifty famous prisoners executed during the Terror.

The Prisoner's Chapel was rebuilt in 1776, after a fire that destroyed the earlier oratory. It is little changed from the time of the Revolution. The altar, confessional and the large crucifix date to the 18th century. Women could attend the services seated separately on the upper level, behind bars. Black curtains behind the altar cover the entrance to the memorial chapel dedicated to Marie Antoinette. The chapel was probably used as a cell during the Terror, when the prison was particularly overcrowded.

=== Memorial Chapel or Marie Antoinette Chapel ===
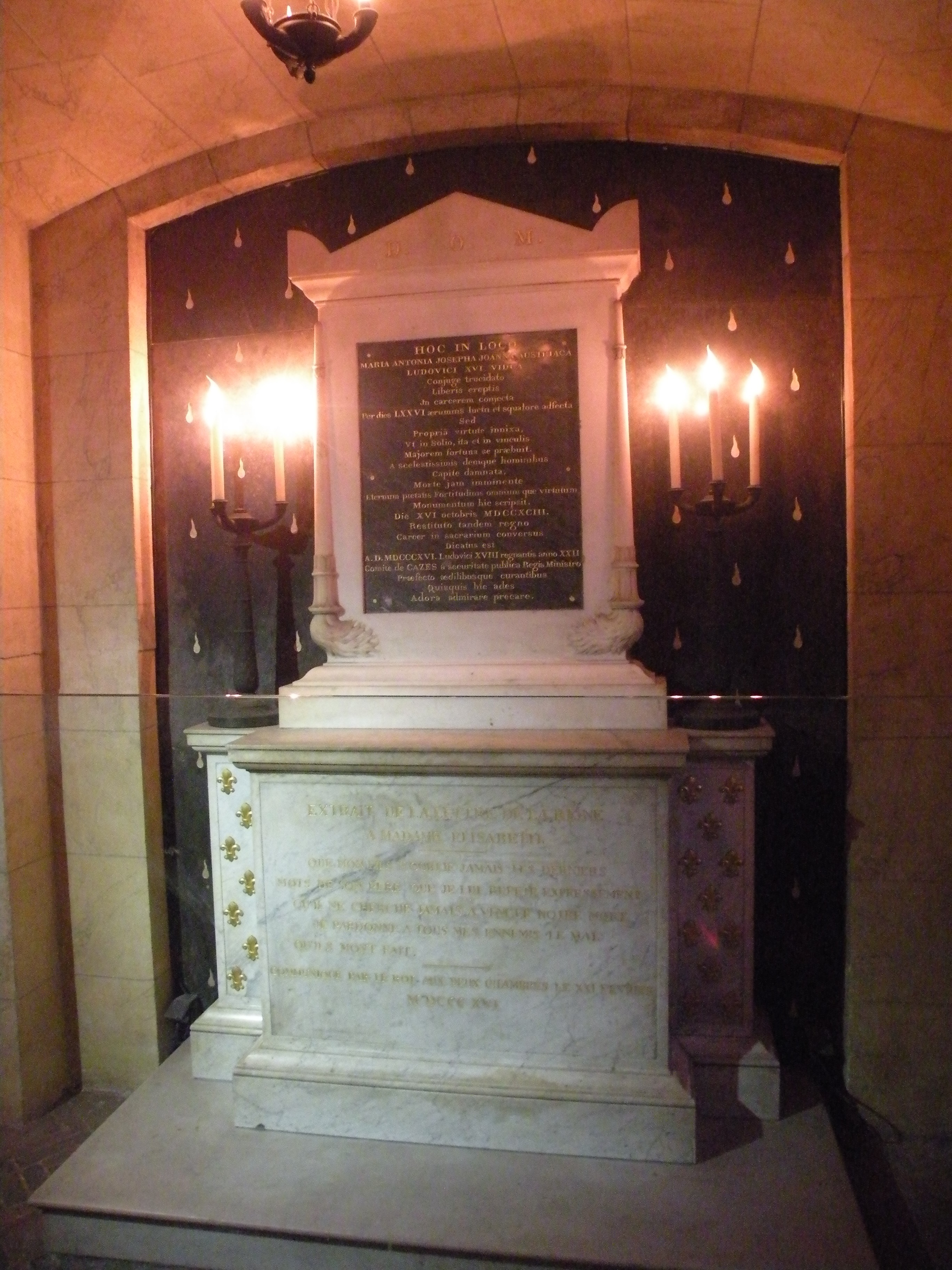
Marie Antoinette Chapel, on the site of her cell, with teardrop motif on black marble

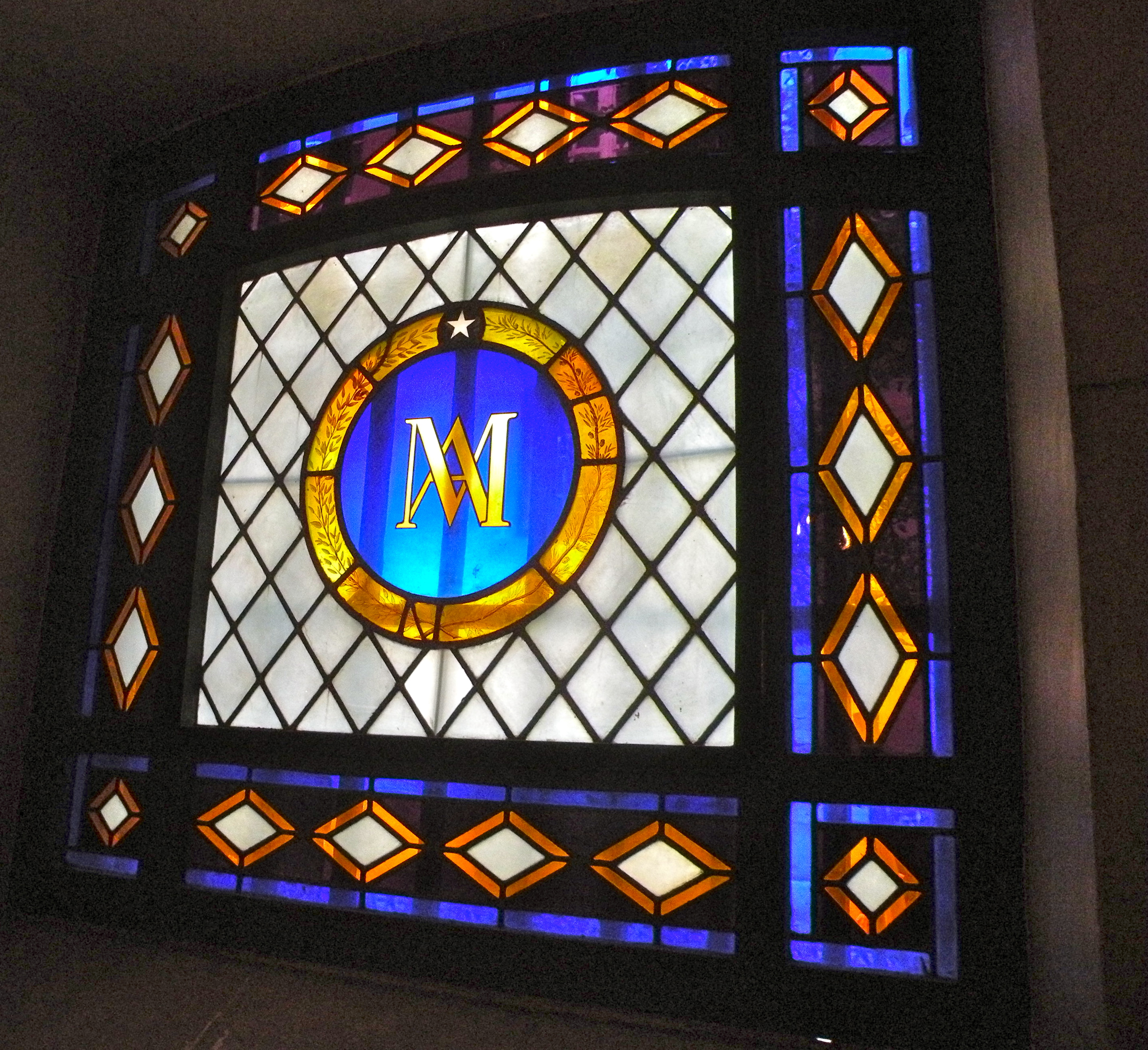
The single window of the Memorial Chapel, with initials of Marie Antoinette

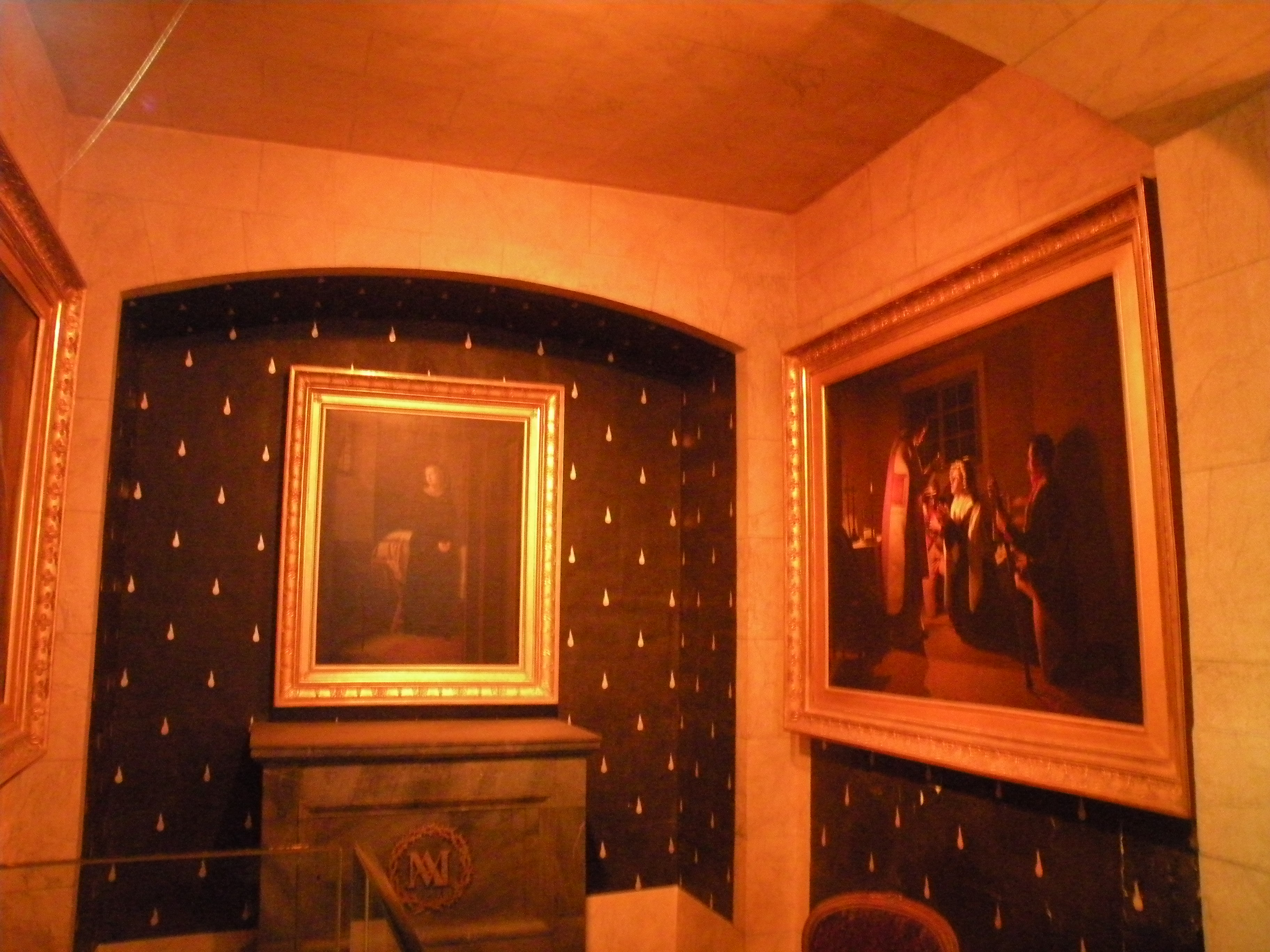
Paintings of Marie Antoinette in the Memorial Chapel

The original cell of Marie Antoinette was destroyed after the restoration of the monarchy and was replaced in 1815 by the Memorial Chapel, dedicated to her, on the site of her cell. It was commissioned by Louis XVIII, brother of the executed Louis XVI, It contains a marble monument dedicated to the Queen, with "The Queen's Testament", and three paintings of the Queen depicting her imprisonment. The only light in the chapel comes from a single stained glass window, and the black faux-marble walls are marked with stone teardrops.

=== Women's Courtyard ===
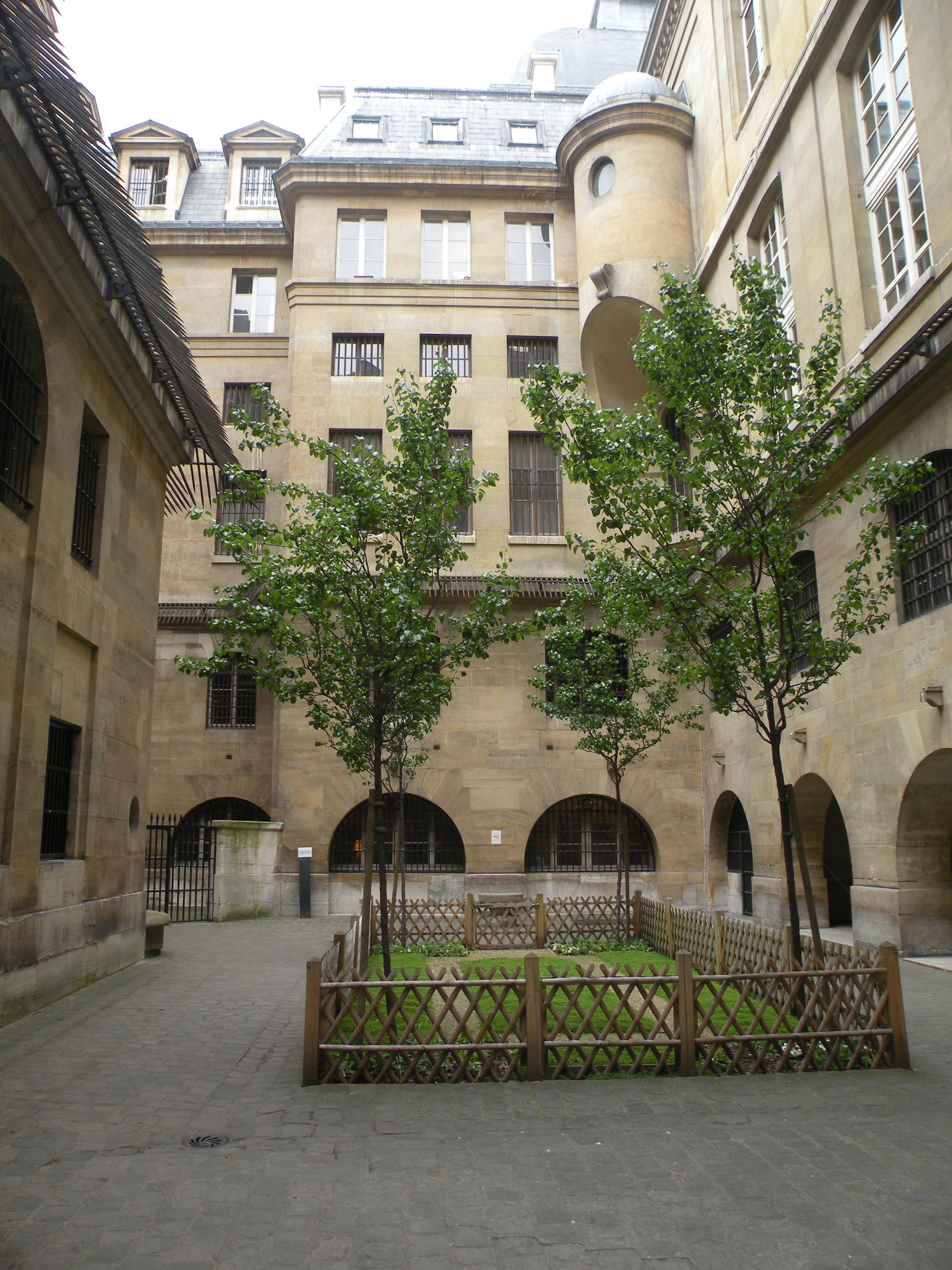
Courtyard for women prisoners, little changed since 18th century

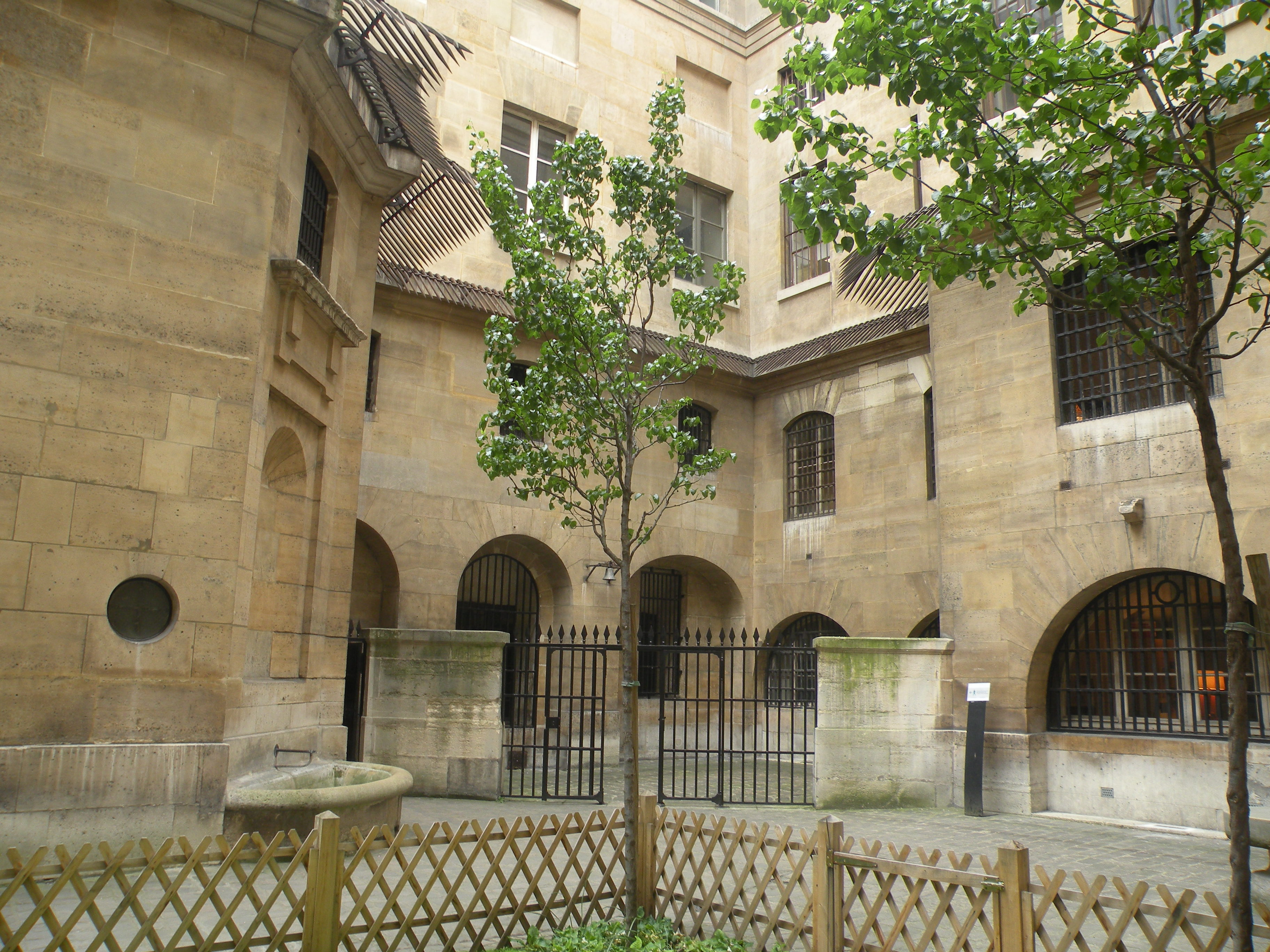
Women's courtyard, with fountain

The Women's courtyard, where Marie Antoinette and other women prisoners were allowed to exercise, is little changed from the time of the Revolution. The arcades, garden, stone table, and fountain where prisoners could wash their garments, date from that period. At the back of the garden, in the northeast corner, is a small triangular area separated from the women's courtyard by a gate. This area belonged to the men's prison, and was probably used for the secure transfer of prisoners.

== See also ==
- List of tourist attractions in Paris

== Sources ==
- Busson, Didier (2001). Paris ville antique (in French). Monum- Éditions du Patrimoine. ISBN 978-2-85822-368-8.
- de Parseval, Béatrice; Mazeau, Guillaume (2019). La Conciergerie - Palais de la Cité (in French). Paris: Editions du Patrimoine- Centre des Monuments historiques. ISBN 978-2-7577-0667-1.
- Delon, Monique (2000). La Conciergerie - Palais de la Cité (in French). Paris: Editions du Patrimoine- Centre des Monuments historiques. ISBN 978-2-85822-298-8.
- Fierro, Alfred (1996). Histoire et dictionnaire de Paris (in French). Robert Laffont. ISBN 2-221--07862-4.
- Lorentz, Phillipe; Sandron, Dany (2006). Atlas de Paris au Moyen Âge (in French). Paris: Parigramme. pp. 238 pp. ISBN 2-84096-402-3.
- "The Conciergerie." Ministère De La Justice. N.p., n.d. Web. 6 Dec. 2012.
