= September Massacres =

1792 killings of prisoners in Paris

- Part of the French Revolution
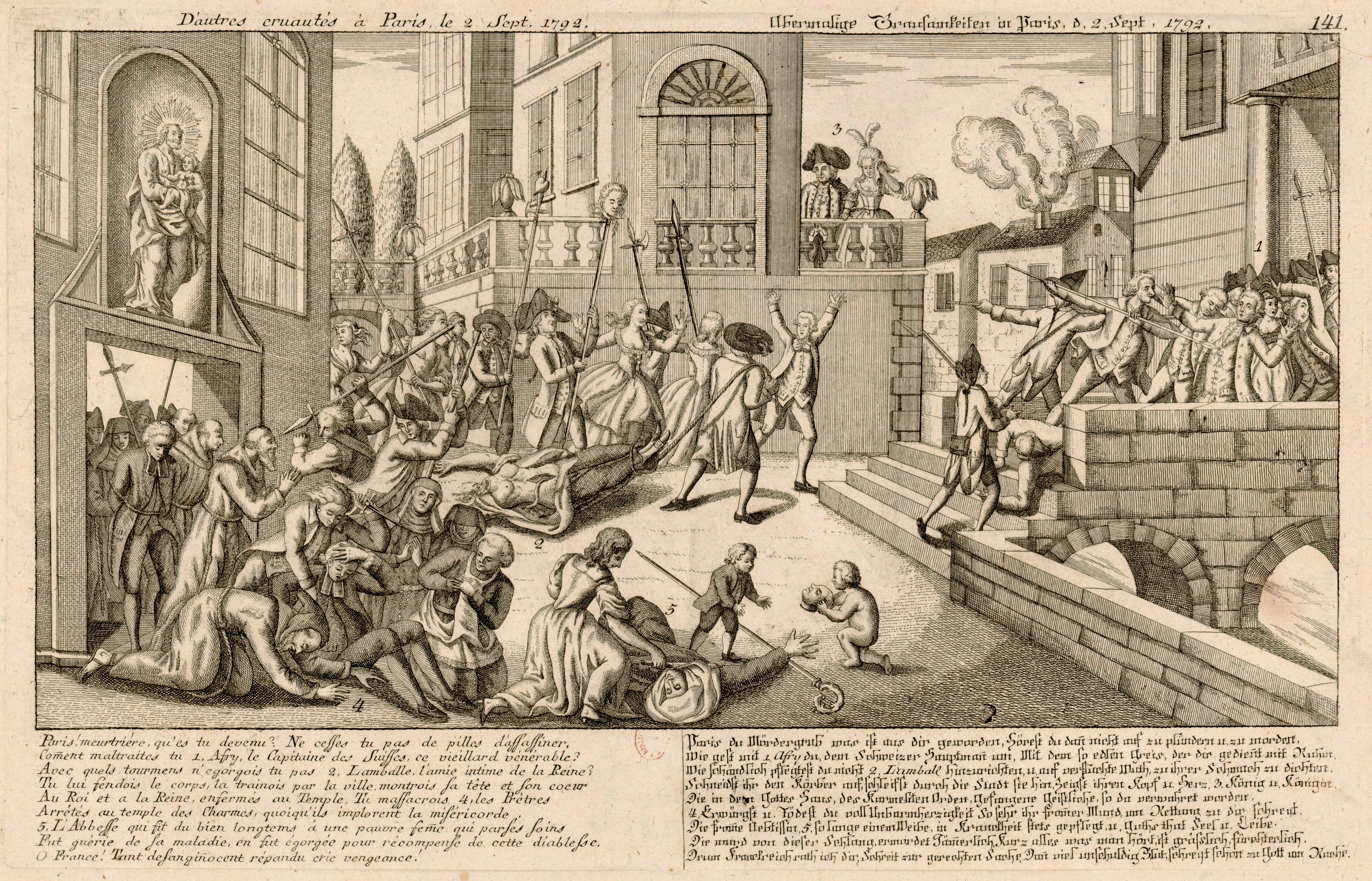
- Contemporary engraving depicting the killing of priests, nuns and Princess de Lamballe. Captions with poems condemning the massacres in French and German.
- Native name: Massacres de Septembre
- Date: 2–6 September 1792
- Location: Paris
- Type: Summary execution, massacres
- Cause: Obsession with a prison conspiracy, desire for revenge, fear of advancing Prussians and royalists, ambiguity over who was in control
- Participants: Sans-culottes, fédérés, and guardsmen
- Outcome: Half the prison population of Paris summarily executed
- Deaths: 1,100–1,600

The September Massacres were a series of killings and summary executions of prisoners in Paris that occurred in 1792 from 2 September to 6 September during the French Revolution. Between 1,176 and 1,614 people were killed by sans-culottes, fédérés, and guardsmen, with the support of gendarmes responsible for guarding the tribunals and prisons, the Cordeliers, the Committee of Surveillance of the Commune, and the revolutionary sections of Paris.

With Prussian and royalist armies advancing on Paris, and widespread fear that prisoners in the city would be freed to join them, on 1 September the Legislative Assembly called for volunteers to gather the next day on the Champs de Mars. On 2 September, around 1:00 pm, Minister of Justice Georges Danton delivered a speech in the assembly, stating: "We ask that anyone refusing to give personal service or to furnish arms shall be punished with death. The bell we are about to ring... sounds the charge on the enemies of our country." The massacres began around 2:30 pm in the middle of Saint-Germain-des-Prés, and within the first 20 hours more than 1,000 prisoners were killed.

The next morning, the surveillance committees of the commune published a circular that called on provincial patriots to defend Paris by eliminating counter-revolutionaries, and the secretary, Jean-Lambert Tallien, called on other cities to follow suit. The massacres were repeated in a few other French cities; in total 65–75 incidents were reported. The exact number of victims is not known, as over 440 people had uncertain fates, including from 22 to 200 Swiss soldiers. The identity of the perpetrators, called "septembriseurs", is poorly documented, but a large number were Parisian national guards and provincial federates who had remained in the city since their arrival in July. Of those killed, 72% were non-political prisoners including forgers of assignats (galley convicts), common criminals, women, and children, while 17% were Catholic priests.

The minister of the interior, Roland, accused the commune of the atrocities. Charlotte Corday held Jean-Paul Marat responsible, while Madame Roland blamed Danton. Danton was also accused by later French historians Adolphe Thiers, Alphonse de Lamartine, Jules Michelet, Louis Blanc and Edgar Quinet of doing nothing to stop them. According to modern historian Georges Lefebvre, the "collective mentality is a sufficient explanation for the killing". Historian Timothy Tackett deflected specific blame from individuals, stating: "The obsession with a prison conspiracy, the desire for revenge, the fear of the advancing Prussians, the ambiguity over who was in control of a state that had always relied in the past on a centralized monarchy: all had come together in a volatile mixture of anger, fear, and uncertainty."

== Background ==
=== Brunswick Manifesto ===
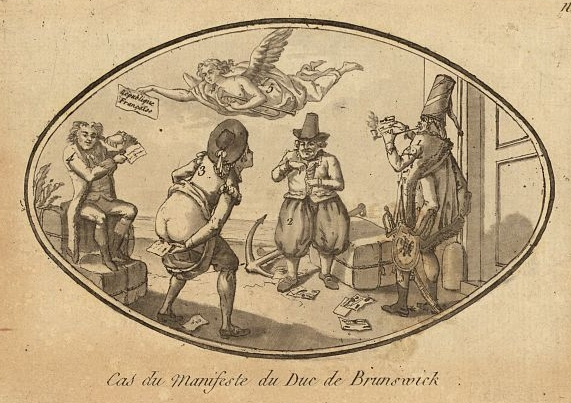
Anonymous caricature depicting the treatment given to the Brunswick Manifesto by the French population

In April 1792 France declared war on the Habsburg monarchy, prompting the War of the First Coalition. In July, an army under the Duke of Brunswick and composed mostly of Prussians joined the Austrian side and invaded France. As the army advanced, Paris went into a state of hysteria, especially after the Duke issued the "Brunswick Manifesto" on 25 July. His avowed aim was

to put an end to the anarchy in the interior of France, to check the attacks upon the throne and the altar, to reestablish the legal power, to restore to the king the security and the liberty of which he is now deprived and to place him in a position to exercise once more the legitimate authority which belongs to him.

The manifesto threatened the French population with instant punishment should it resist the imperial and Prussian armies or the reinstatement of the monarchy. The manifesto was frequently described as unlawful and offensive to national sovereignty. Its authorship was frequently in doubt. Revolutionaries like Jean-Paul Marat and Jacques Hébert preferred to concentrate on the internal enemy. On 3 August Pétion and 47 sections demanded the deposition of the king.

=== Insurrection of the Paris Commune ===
On the evening of 9 August 1792, a Jacobin insurrection overthrew the leadership of the Paris municipality, proclaiming a new revolutionary commune headed by transitional authorities. The next day the insurrectionists stormed the Tuileries Palace. King Louis XVI was imprisoned with the royal family, and his authority as king was suspended by the Legislative Assembly. The following day the royalist press was silenced.

A provisional executive (conseil exécutif) was named and busied itself with reorganizing or solving questions concerning the police, justice, the army, navy, and paper money, but actual power now rested with the new revolutionary commune, whose strength resided in the mobilized and armed sans-culottes (the lower classes of Paris) and fédérés, armed volunteers from the provinces that had arrived at the end of July. The 48 sections of Paris were equipped with munitions from the plundered arsenals in the days before the assault.

Supported by a new armed force, the commune dominated the Legislative Assembly and its decisions. The commune pushed through several measures: universal suffrage was adopted, the civilian population was armed, all remnants of noble privileges were abolished and the properties of the émigrés were sold. These events meant a change of direction from the political and constitutional perspective of the Girondists to a more social approach given by the commune as expressed by Pierre-Joseph Cambon: "To reject with more efficacy the defenders of despotism, we have to address the fortunes of the poor, we have to associate the Revolution with this multitude that possesses nothing, we have to convert the people to the cause."

Besides these measures, the commune engaged in a policy of political repression of all suspected counter-revolutionary activities. Beginning on 11 August, every Paris section named surveillance committees (committees of vigilance) for conducting searches and making arrests. It was mostly these decentralized committees, rather than the commune as a whole, that engaged in the repression of August and September 1792. Within a few days each section elected three commissioners to take seats in the insurrectionary commune; one of them was Maximilien Robespierre.

To ensure that there was some appropriate legal process for dealing with suspects accused of political crimes and treason, rather than arbitrary killing by local committees, a revolutionary tribunal, with extraordinary powers to impose the death sentence without any appeal, was installed on 17 August. Robespierre, who had proposed this measure, refused to preside over the tribunal, arguing that the same man ought not to be a denouncer, an accuser, and a judge.

Already, on 15 August, four sections called for all priests and imprisoned suspects to be put to death before the volunteers departed. Robespierre proposed to erect a pyramid on Place Vendôme to remember the victims of 10 August. On 19 August the nonjuring priests were ordered to leave the country within two weeks, which meant before 2 September. In Paris, all monasteries were closed and would soon be in use as hospitals, etc. The remaining religious orders were banned by the law of 15 August. Marat left nothing in doubt when he urged "good citizens to go to the Abbaye, to seize priests, and especially the officers of the Swiss Guards and their accomplices and run a sword through them". From 15 to 25 August, around 500 detentions were registered; some were sent to Orléans. Half the detentions were of nonjuring priests, but even priests who had sworn the required oath were caught in the wave.

=== Prussian advance and Paris reaction ===
Around 26 August, news reached Paris that the Prussian army had crossed the French border and occupied Longwy without a battle. Roland proposed that the government should leave Paris, whereas Robespierre suggested in a letter to the sections of the commune that they should defend liberty and equality and maintain their posts, and die if necessary. In the evening, in the presence of 350,000 people, a funeral ceremony was held in the gardens of the Tuileries for those killed while storming the Tuileries.

On 28 August, the assembly ordered a curfew for around two days. The city gates were closed; all communication with the country was stopped. At the behest of Justice Minister Danton, 30 commissioners from the sections were ordered to search in every (suspect) house for weapons, munition, swords, carriages and horses. "They searched every drawer and every cupboard, sounded every panel, lifted every hearthstone, inquired into every correspondence in the capital. As a result of this inquisition, more than 1,000 "suspects" were added to the immense body of political prisoners already confined in the jails and convents of the city."

On 29 August, the Prussians attacked Verdun. When this news arrived it escalated panic in the capital; the situation was highly critical. Throughout August, the Legislative Assembly, which had been greatly diminished as more than half of the deputies had fled since the storming of the Tuileries, had acquiesced to the activities of the commune and its sections. On 30 August, the Girondins Roland and Marguerite-Élie Guadet tried to suppress the influence of the commune, which they accused of exercising unlawful power. The assembly, tired of the pressures, declared the commune illegal and suggested the organization of communal elections and a doubling of the number of seats. However, the assembly canceled the decree the next day at the request of Jacques-Alexis Thuriot. The balance of power was disrupted, and the conflict between the Girondins and the Montagnards would influence the progress of the French Revolution.

On 1 September the prisons were full. The citizens of Paris were told to prepare themselves for the defense of the country and gather immediately upon the sound of the tocsin. Their imminent departure from the capital provoked further concern about the crowded prisons, now full of counter-revolutionary suspects who might threaten a city deprived of so many of its defenders. Marat called for a "new blood-letting", larger than the one on 10 August. Marat and his Committee of Surveillance of the Commune organized the massacres, first voting to round up 4,000 mostly ordinary people, "suspects" of the committee, agreed to kill them in "whole groups", voting down a Marat proposal to murder them by setting them on fire, then finally agreeing to a proposal by Jacques-Nicolas Billaud-Varenne to "butcher them". The bulk of the butchers were made up of "Marseilles", "hired assassins" from the prisons of Genoa and Sicily, paid 24 dollars, whose names were listed by "M. Granier de Cassagnac". The rest were murderers and others previously imprisoned for violent crimes released ahead of time from the prisons they would soon be returning to for the massacres.

Earl Gower, the British ambassador reported:

A party at the instigation of someone or other declared they would not quit Paris, as long as the prisons were filled with Traitors (for they called those so, that were confined in the different Prisons and Churches), who might in the absence of such a number of Citizens rise and not only effect the release of His Majesty but make an entire counterrevolution.

On 1 September the gates of the city were opened on the orders of Pétion, providing an opportunity for suspects to flee the capital. According to Louis-Marie Prudhomme people still profited from the opportunity on 2 September. (Verdun capitulated on 2 September gaining a clear westward path to Paris.) The Assembly decreed arming the volunteers; a third would stay in Paris and defend the city with pikes, the others were meant for the frontier and the trenches. It further decreed that traitors who refused to participate in the defense or hand over their arms deserved death. The sections, gathered in the town hall, decided to remain in Paris; Marat proposed to have Roland and fellow Girondist Brissot arrested. At around 1:00 pm, Danton delivered a speech in the assembly: "We ask that anyone refusing to give personal service or to furnish arms shall be punished with death." "The bell we are about to ring is not an alarm signal; it sounds the charge on the enemies of our country." After the applause, he continued, "To conquer them we must dare, dare again, always dare, and France is saved." His speech acted as a call for direct action among the citizens, as well as a strike against the external enemy. Madame Roland, Hillary Mantel, Louis Mortimer−Ternaux thought the speech was responsible for inciting the September Massacres. The commune ordered the gates closed, and an alarm gun fired. After the tocsin was rung around 2:00 pm, 50 or 60,000 men enrolled for the defense of the country on the Champs de Mars.

Around 4 pm Madame de Staël, as ambassadress of Sweden who lived in Rue du Bac near Champ de Mars, tried to flee through crowded streets, but her carriage was stopped and the crowd forced her to go to the Paris town hall, where Robespierre presided. (However, according to Robespierre's sister Charlotte, he never presided over the insurrectionary commune. According to Jean-Baptiste Louvet de Couvray he "governed" the Paris Conseil Général of the département.) Late in the evening, she was conveyed home, escorted by the procurator Louis Pierre Manuel. The next day the secretary-general to the Commune of Paris, Tallien, arrived with a passport and accompanied her to the barrier.

== Massacres ==
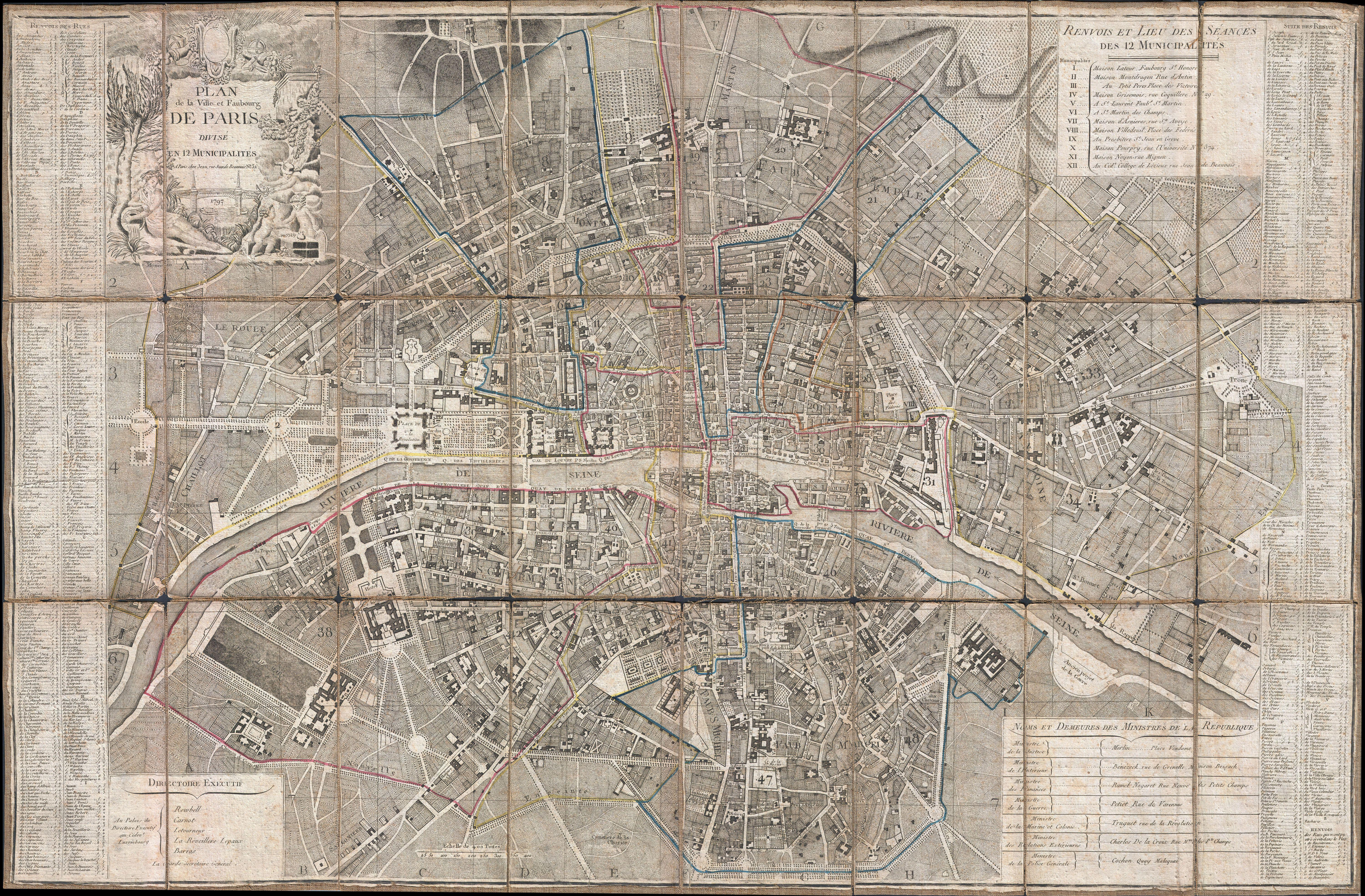
Map of Paris and the Faubourgs (1797). The La Force prison was in Le Marais on Rue Pavée, near Place des Fédérés. The Conciergerie was located on the west side of the Île de la Cité, next to the Palais de Justice.

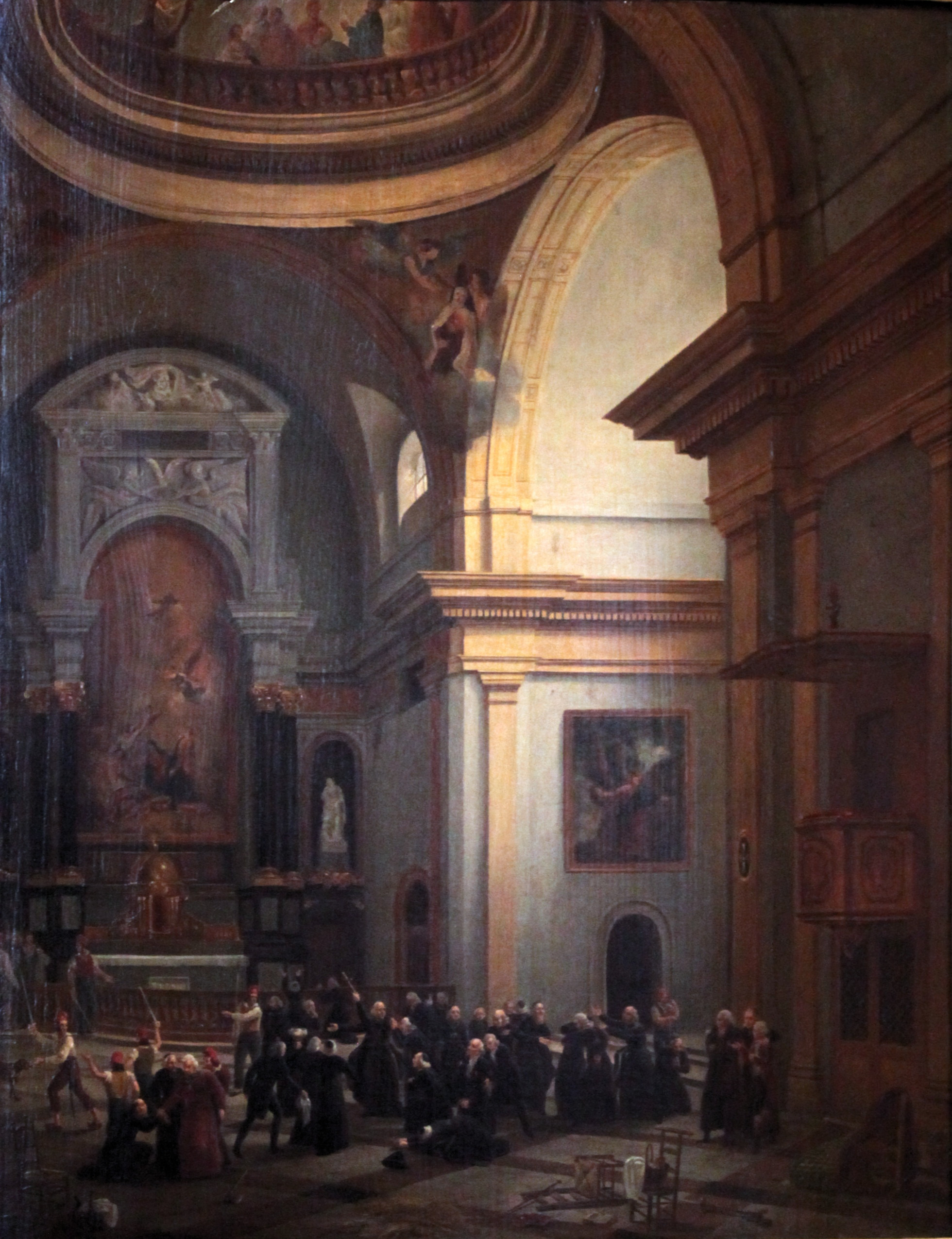
115 priests were killed in the Carmes prison. Le massacre des Carmes by Marie–Marc–Antoine Bilcocq, (1820). Musée de la Révolution française

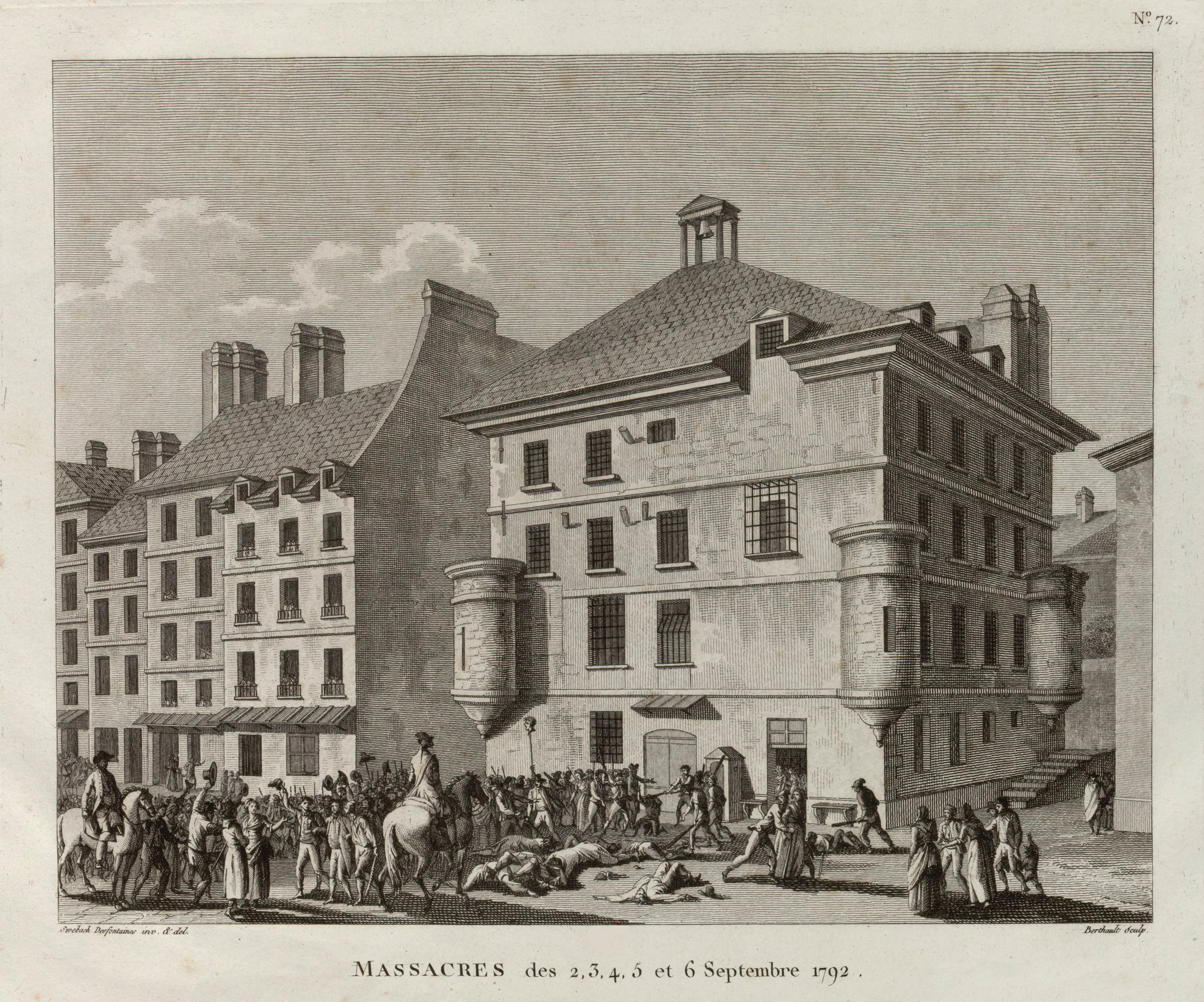
Prison de l'Abbaye where 160–220 people were killed in three days. It was located between Rue de Bussi and Rue du Four (E40), with the entrance on Rue Sainte-Marguerite, today 133, Boulevard Saint-Germain.

The first massacre began in the quartier Latin around 2:30 pm on 2 September when 24 nonjuring priests were being transported to the prison de l'Abbaye near the Abbey of Saint-Germain-des-Prés, after being interrogated by Billaud-Varenne in the town hall. One of the carriages, escorted by fédérés, was attacked after an incident. The fédérés killed three men in the middle of the street, before the procession arrived at the prison. Eighteen of the arrested were taken inside. They then mutilated the bodies, "with circumstances of barbarity too shocking to describe" according to the British diplomatic dispatch. One of their victims was the former minister of foreign affairs Armand Marc, comte de Montmorin. Roch-Ambroise Cucurron Sicard was recognized as a beneficent priest and released.

=== Carmes prison ===
In the late afternoon 115 priests in the former convent of Carmelites, detained with the message they would be deported to French Guiana, were massacred in the courtyard with axes, spikes, swords and pistols by people with a strong patois accent. They forced the priests one by one to take the oath on the Civil Constitution of the Clergy and "swear to be faithful to the nation and to maintain liberty and equality or die defending it". Some priests hid in the choir and behind the altar. Several tried to get away by climbing in the trees and over the walls and making their escape through the Rue Cassette. Among the dead were Solomon Leclercq and Jacques Jules Bonnaud. At around 5:00 pm, a group of 200 "Septembriseurs" came to the house of Roland on Place Dauphine to arrest him, but as he was at the ministry they went there.

=== Prison de l'Abbaye ===
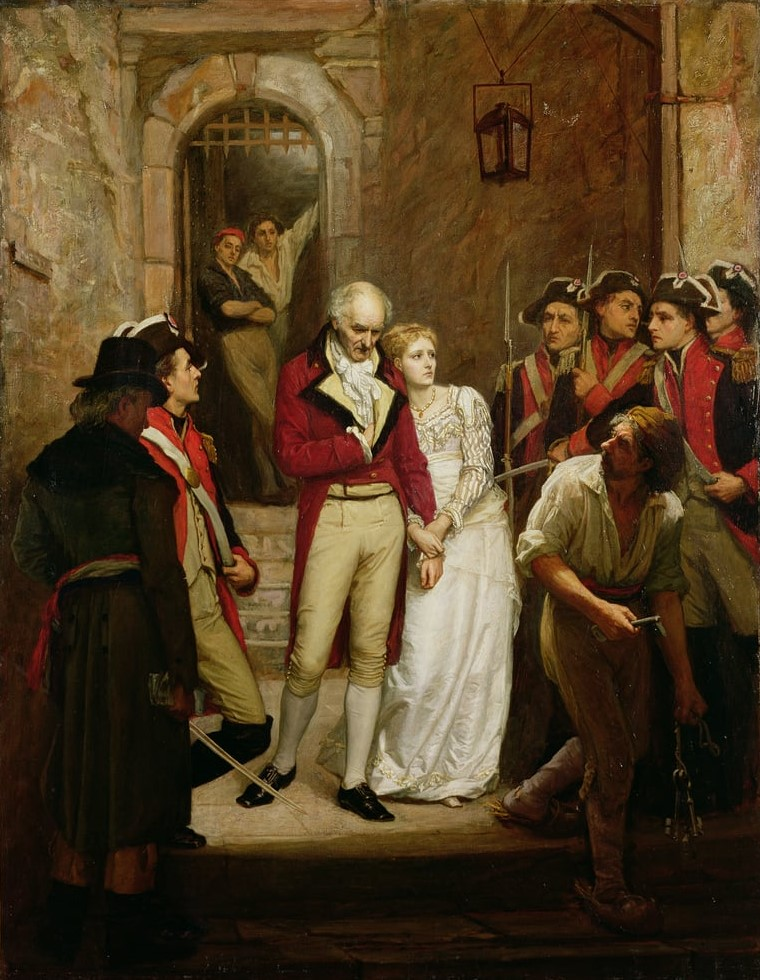
An Incident during the Massacre: Charles François de Virot de Sombreuil and his daughter leaving the prison. Painting by Walter William Ouless

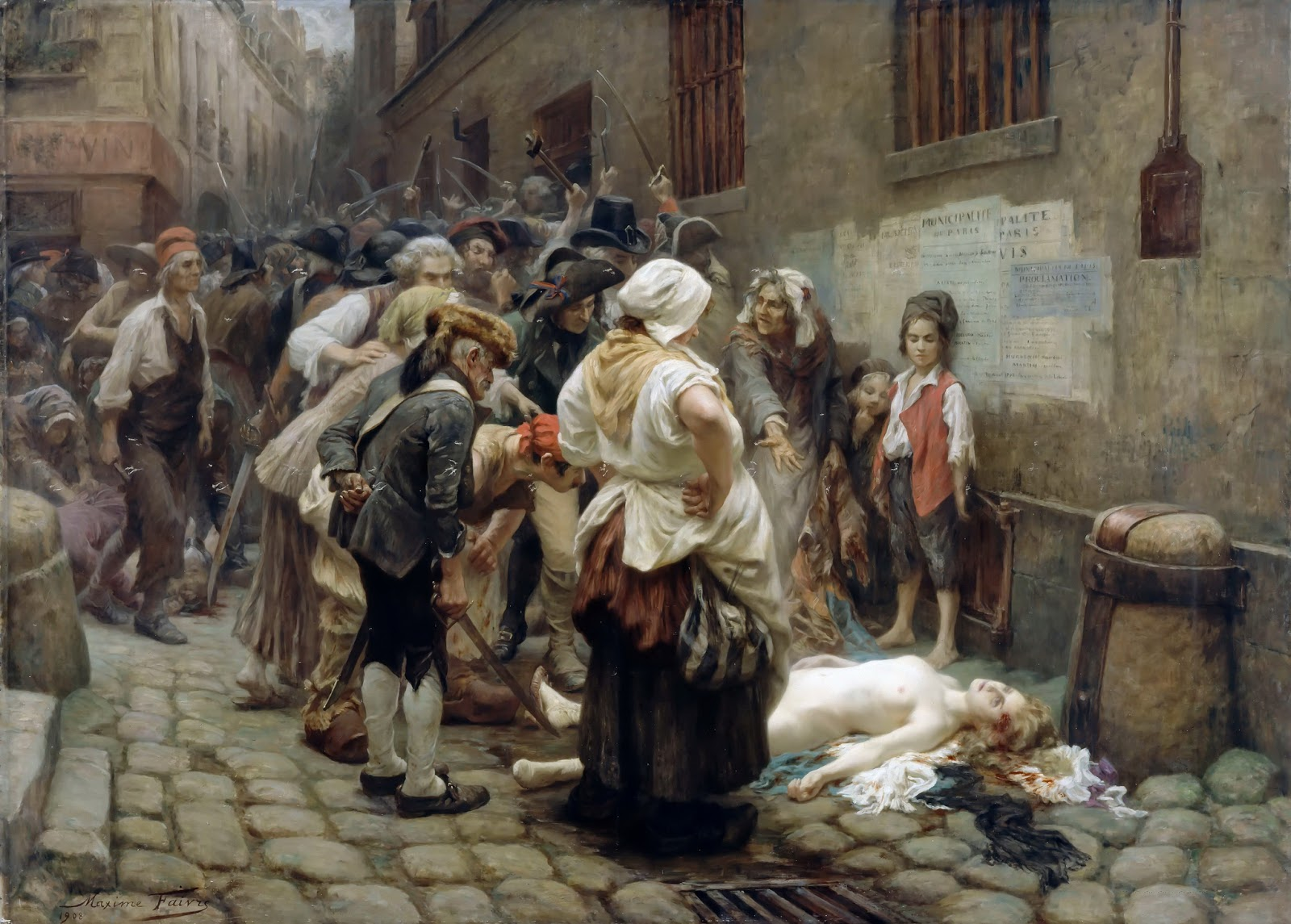
Léon-Maxime Faivre (1908) The death of the Princesse de Lamballe

Between 7:00 and 8:00 pm, the group of fédérés and others was back at the Abbaye prison. The Abbaye prison was located in what is now the Boulevard Saint-Germain just west of the current Passage de la Petite Boucherie. The door was closed, but the killing was resumed after an intense discussion with Manuel, the procurator, on people's justice and failing judges. Manuel and Jean Dussaulx belonged to a deputation sent by the "Conseil Général" of the commune to ask for compassion. They were insulted and escaped with their lives.

A tribunal composed of 12 people presided over by Stanislas-Marie Maillard started the interrogation by asking the prisoner why he or she was arrested. A lie was fatal, and the prisoners were summarily judged and either freed or executed. Each prisoner was asked a handful of questions, after which the prisoner was either freed with the words "Vive la nation" and permitted to leave, or sentenced to death with the words "Conduct him to the Abbaye" or "Let him go", after which the condemned was taken to a yard and was immediately killed by a waiting mob consisting of men, women, and children.

The massacres were opposed by the staff of the prison, who allowed many prisoners to escape, one example being Pauline de Tourzel. The Prison de l'Abbaye contained many prisoners formerly belonging to the royal household, as well as survivors of the Swiss Guards from the royal palace. Among them were the royal governesses Marie Angélique de Mackau and Louise-Élisabeth de Croÿ de Tourzel; the ladies-in-waiting the Princess de Tarente and the Princess de Lamballe; the queen's ladies-maids Marie-Élisabeth Thibault and Mme Bazile; the dauphin's nurse St Brice; the Princesse de Lamballe's lady's maid Navarre; and the valets of the king, Chamilly and Hue. All ten former members of the royal household were placed before the tribunals and freed from charges, with the exception of the Princess de Lamballe, whose death would become one of the most publicized of the September Massacres. Louise-Élisabeth de Croÿ de Tourzel was released on order of Manuel by the Commune.

Of the Swiss Guard prisoners 135 were killed, 27 were transferred, 86 were set free, and 22 had uncertain fates. According to George Long 122 died and 43 people were released. The victims had to leave behind money, jewelry, silver, gold, assignats, and a copy of the Aeneid. Most of the victims' clothes were pierced with spade marks and had bloodstains. According to Louvet four armed men came to the house of Roland to get paid. On 3 September at 9 am, Billaud-Varenne came to the Abbaye prison and declared that the tribunal should stop stealing and would get paid by the Commune. At 10 am Maillard and his 12 judges resumed their the summary judgments. In three days 216 men and 3 women were massacred in the Abbey.

=== Conciergerie, Saint Firmin and Bernardins ===
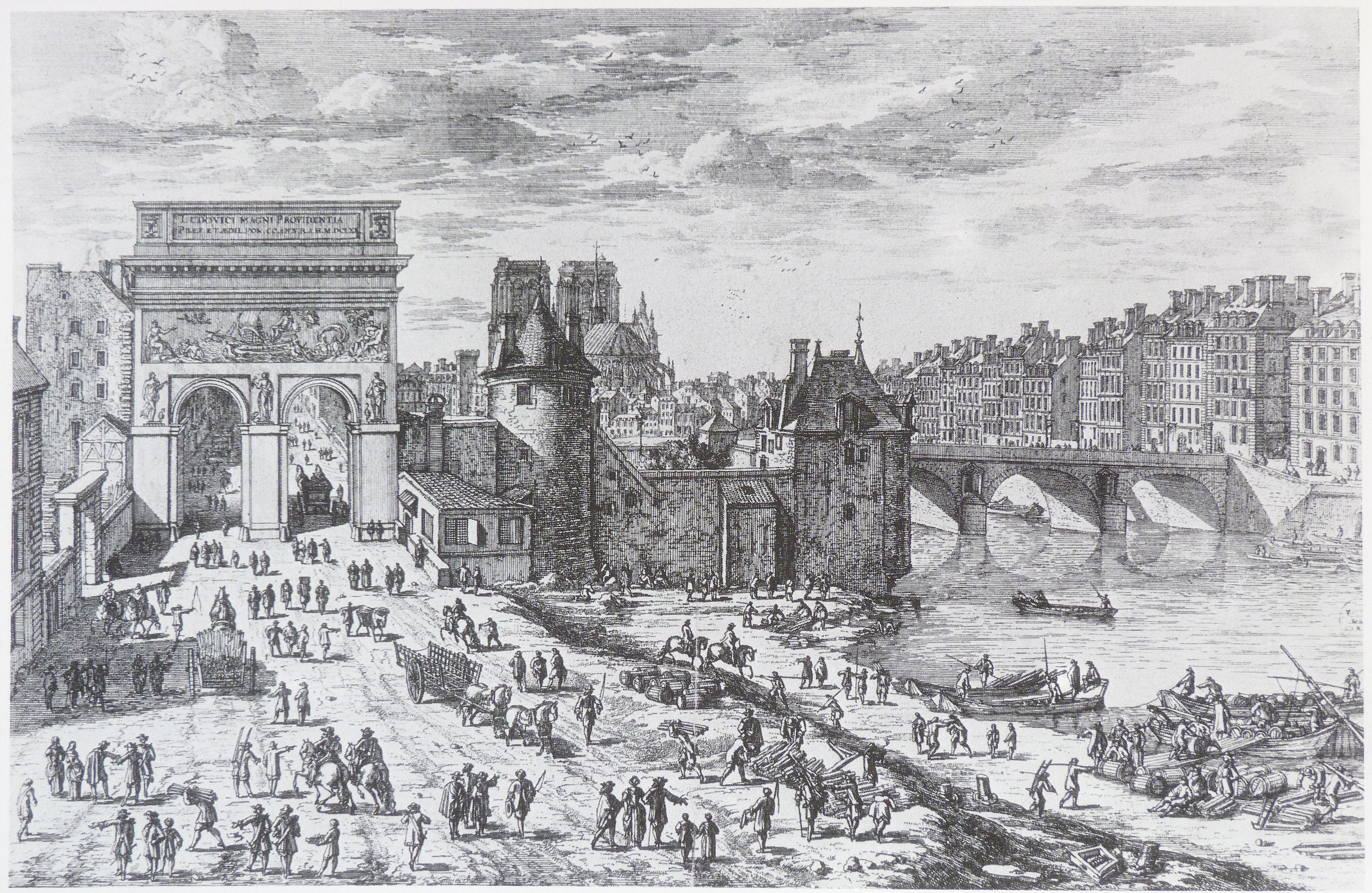
Saint-Bernard where 73 men (locked up in the past three months) were killed and three released.

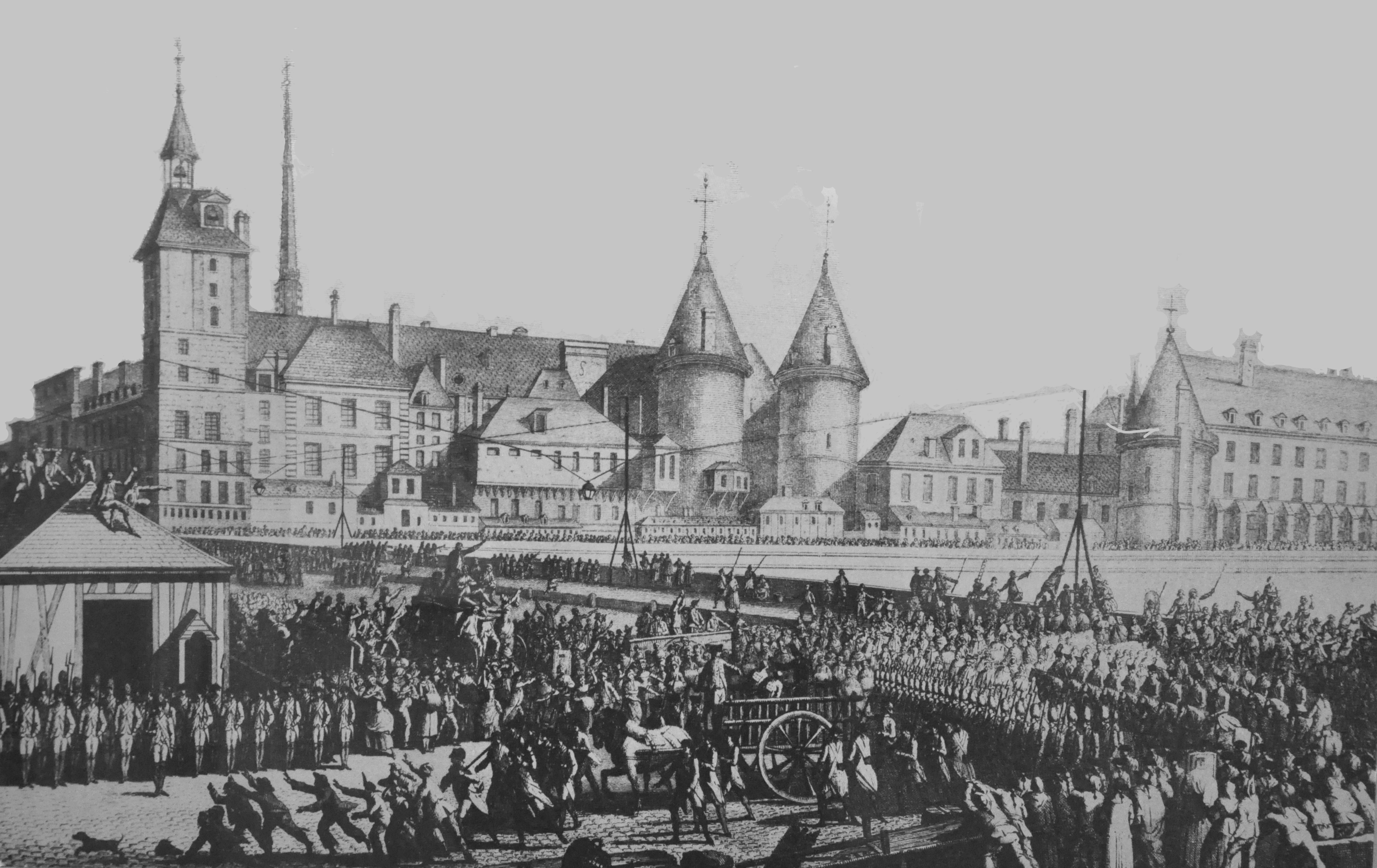
Conciergerie where 250–300 people were killed

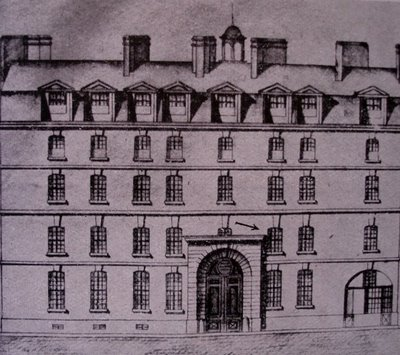
Saint Firmin in the Rue Saint Victor where 73 seminarians were killed

Late in the afternoon, they went to Tour Saint-Bernard (belonging to a confiscated monastery Collège des Bernardins, located in the Sansculotte district) where forgers of assignats were jailed. (Almost all of them had been locked up over the previous three months.) The pattern of semi-formal executions followed by the popular tribunals was for condemned prisoners to be ordered "transferred" and then taken into the prison courtyard where they would be cut down. One man was released after he was recognized as a thief. The participants in the killing received bread, wine and cheese, and some money.

In the early evening, groups broke into another Paris prison, the Conciergerie, via an open door in a side stair. The massacre was more uncontrolled in the Conciergerie than in the Prison de l'Abbaye. In the Conciergerie, the staff did not cooperate by turning the prisoners to the mob; instead, the mob broke into the cells. The massacre continued from late evening through the night until morning. Of 488 prisoners in the Conciergerie, 378 were killed during the massacre. One woman in the Conciergerie, Marie Gredeler, a bookseller who was accused of murder, was tied to a pole, killed, and mutilated.

According to Louis-Marie Prudhomme, people sat on the stairs of the Palace of Justice watching the butchery in the courtyard. Not far away Restif de la Bretonne saw bodies piled high on Pont au Change in front of the Châtelet, then thrown in the river. He recorded the atrocities he witnessed in Les Nuits de Paris (1794).

Before midnight the seminary Saint Firmin was visited by four men, who killed all the seminarians. All of them were detained in August according to Cassagnac. At 2:30 am, the Assembly was informed that most of the prisons were empty. The next morning the Assembly was still involved with the defense of the city; Hérault de Séchelles presided. It decided the other prisoners had to wait for their trial because of a temporary lack of judges.

=== Bicêtre and Salpêtrière ===
Bicêtre, a hospital for men and boys that also served as a prison for beggars and the homeless, was visited twice that day after a rumor that there were thousands of rifles stored there. The commander brought seven cannons. According to Cassagnac François Hanriot and his battalion were present; 56 prisoners were released, and 170 were killed. Mayor Pétion did not have much influence discussing humanity with them.

At dawn Salpêtrière, a hospice for women and girls to which a prison was attached, was visited. The number of victims was 35 women, including 23 underaged; 52 were released according to Cassagnac.

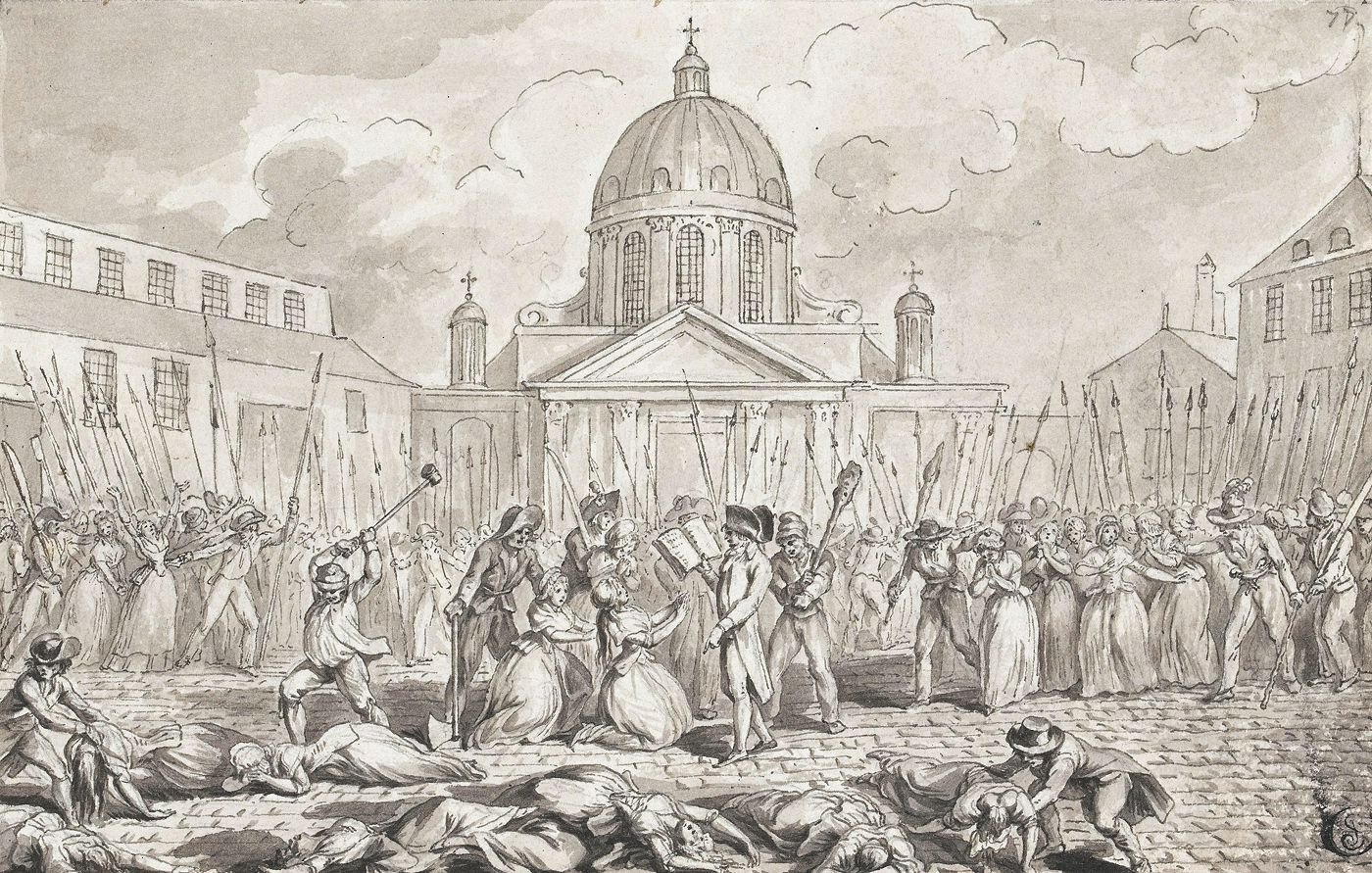
The Salpêtrière hospital where 35 women were killed

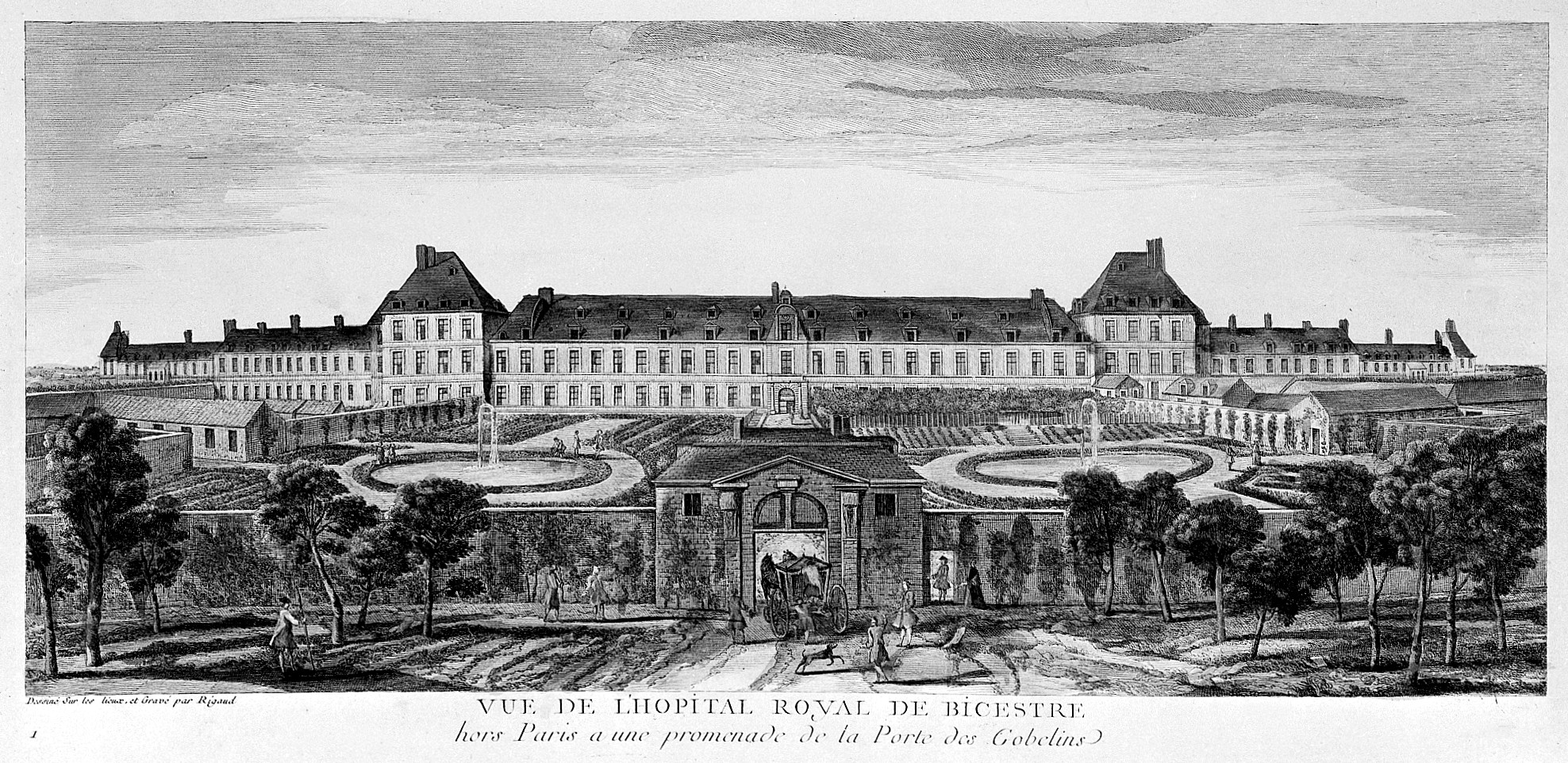
The royal hospital Bicêtre where 150–170 men were killed

=== The end ===
On 4 September the killing in the Abbey finally stopped. Police commissioners Etienne-Jean Panis and Sergent-Marceau gave orders to wash away all the blood from the stairs and the courtyard, to spread straw, to count the corpses, and to dispose of them on carts to avoid infections. A contract was signed with the gravedigger of the nearby Église Saint-Sulpice, Paris, who had to purchase quicklime. On 5 September, the day of the election, it was "perfectly quiet in Paris" according to Le Moniteur Universel. There were still 80 prisoners in "La Force". On 6 September the massacres finally ended. The next day the gates were opened, but it was impossible to travel to another department without a passport.

== Contemporary reports ==
In a letter from 25 January 1793 Helen Maria Williams accused Robespierre and Danton, saying that Marat was only their instrument. Francois Buzot, a Girondin, mentions Camille Desmoulins and Fabre d'Eglantine.

According to Galart de Montjoie, a lawyer and royalist, in those days everyone believed the fédérés from Marseille, Avignon and Brest were involved in the killing. About 800–1000 were staying in barracks but moved supposedly to where events would take place. During the storming of the Tuileries the Fédéres were in the front. It is not exactly known how many of them were killed; according to Axel Fersen 600, according to Robespierre only hundred men. It seems around 300 Fédérés from Brest and 500 from Marseille were then lodged in Cordeliers Convent. Servan planned to give them military training before using them to supplement the army at the front.

The fact is that the reports of conspiracies in the prisons, however improbable, and the constant propaganda about the people's will and the people's anger, held everyone in a sort of stupor and gave the impression that this infamous performance was the work of the populace, whereas in reality there were not above 200 criminals.

Though it is an ascertained fact that the perpetrators of the atrocious murders were but a few; yet it is not so clear that this work was not connived at, or consented to, by a much greater number, and those perhaps in authority; for otherwise, two or three companies of the town guard would have been sufficient to disperse those who were employed on the occasion.

Perry describes the restoration of order after the events, giving the impression that the massacres may even have had a cathartic effect. He also suggests that France was plagued by fewer foreign enemies afterward. What emerges therefore from Perry's report is a view that, if massacres did take place, they occurred not out of spontaneous popular madness but because of comprehensible grievances.

According to Robert Lindet, Adolphe Thiers, George Long, and Stanley Loomis the massacres were not an outburst of passion, but coldly and carefully organized.

Rather than being proof of the unprecedented depravity of an entire population, the prison massacres were the explicable result of both the "wrath and fury" of the victims of 10 August and the machinations of the Paris Commune, who gave their tacit consent to the killings. Those targeted in the attacks had not been imprisoned unjustly but had been suspected of having aided the court in its negotiations with foreign princes. In a similar way to Perry, Williams emphasizes the understandable impatience of the people, who had been kept waiting too long for justice after the August Days, when husbands, brothers, and fathers had been killed.

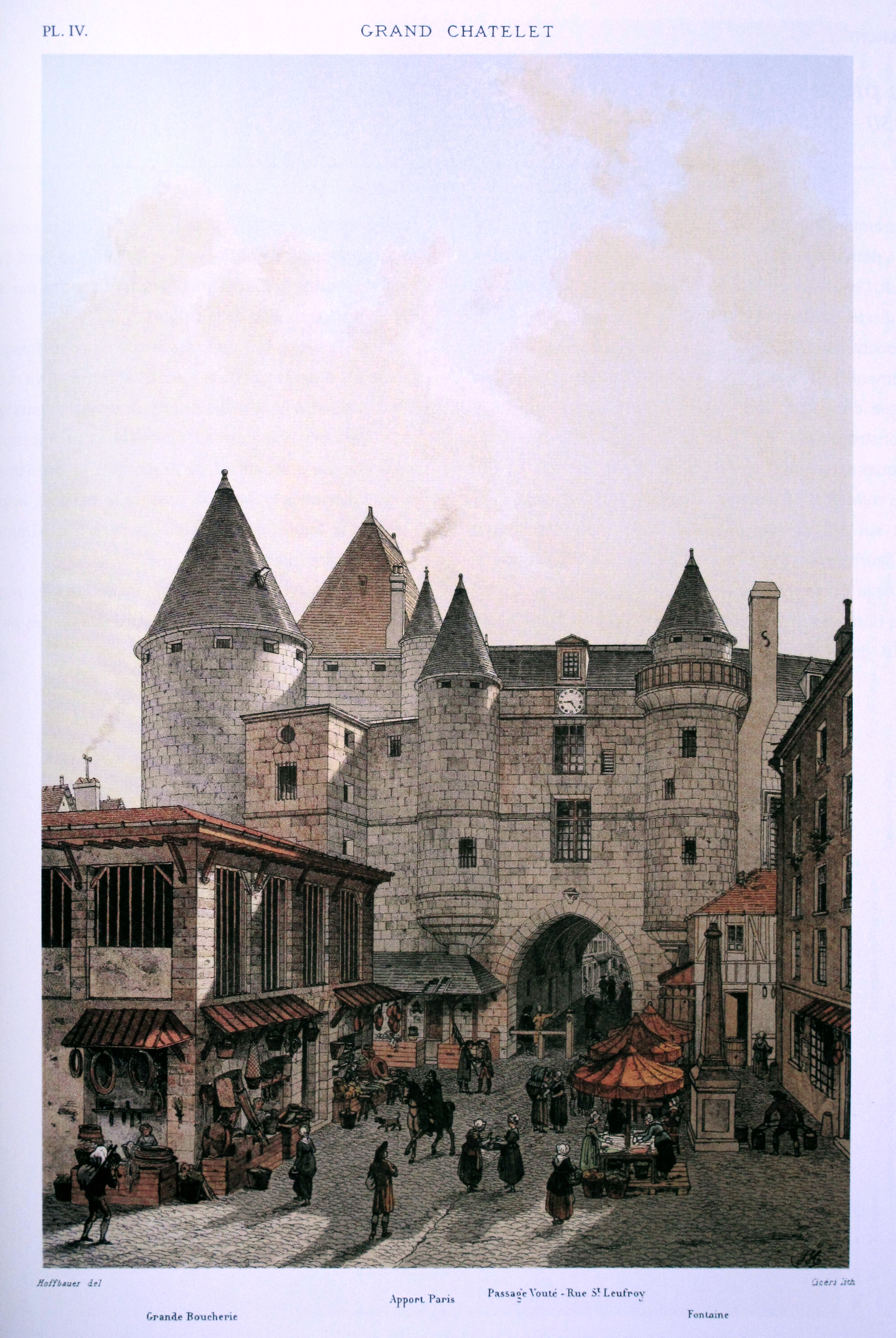
The Grand Châtelet from the north where about 220 people were killed

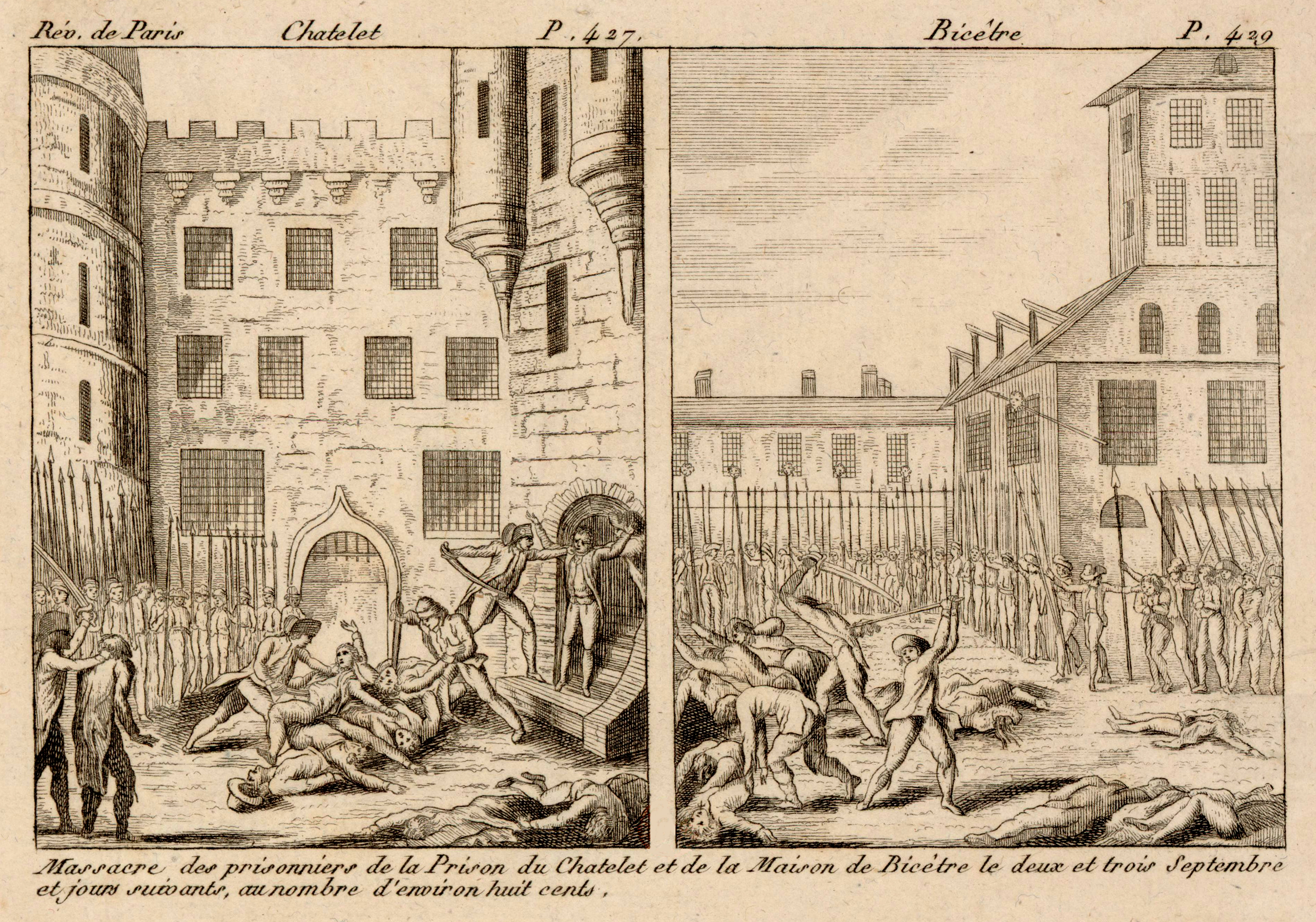
Mass killing of more than 200 prisoners in the Châtelet on 3 September

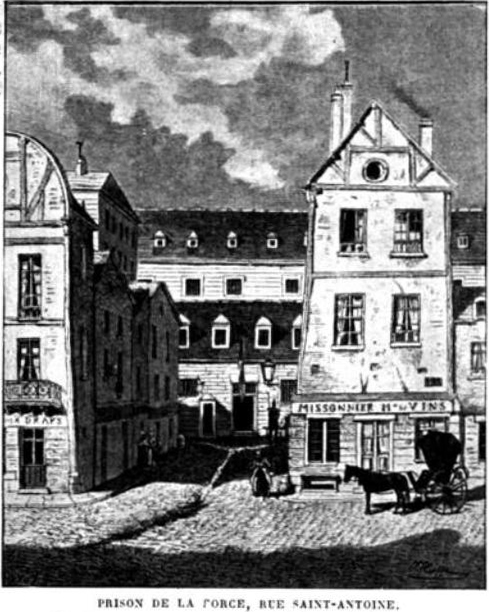
La Force prison where about 165 people were killed in 48 hours.

== Numbers ==
According to Pierre Caron there were almost 2,800 prisoners in early September. Between 1,250 and 1,450 prisoners were condemned and executed. According to Caron and Bluche 70% of the victims were killed in a 20-hour interval. Among the victims were 223 nonjuring Catholic priests and bishops who refused to submit to the Civil Constitution of the Clergy; 81 Swiss Guards; and 40–80 political suspects, mostly royalists, aristocrats, and some former judges and ministers including the queen's best friend, the Princesse de Lamballe. The lives of about 1,250–1,600 prisoners brought before the people's courts were saved. In a few cases people were acclaimed as "patriots" by Robespierre, Tallien, Desmoulins, and Danton. Several prisoners for debts or alimony were released by Louis Pierre Manuel or by the police before 2 September.

Nine prisons were violently entered during the five days of the massacres before the killings concluded on the night of 6–7 September; four were not visited (Sainte-Pélagie Prison, Prison Saint-Lazare, Tour du Temple and palais Bourbon). About 700 surviving Swiss soldiers, locked up in Palais Bourbon, marched to the town hall to take the oath and joined the volunteers. After initially indiscriminate slayings, ad hoc popular tribunals were set up to distinguish between "enemies of the people" and those who were innocent, or at least were not perceived as counter-revolutionary threats. In spite of this attempted sifting, estimated three-quarters of the 1,250–1,450 killed were not counter-revolutionaries or "villains" but included all the galley convicts, forgers of assignats, 37 women and 66 children.

=== Killings outside Paris ===
On 3 September the surveillance committees of the Commune, on which Marat served, published a circular that called on provincial patriots to defend Paris and asked that, before leaving their homes, they eliminate counter-revolutionaries. Marat advised the entire nation "to adopt this necessary measure". A circular was sent to regional authorities by Deforgues, an assistant of Danton, and Tallien, the secretary of the Paris Commune, advising that "ferocious conspirators detained in the prisons had been put to death by the people".

The Girondins afterward made much of this circular, but there is no evidence that it had any influence. As before, murders in the provinces continued: the blood-letting did not cease until the countryside was purged. Smaller-scale executions took place in Reims, Meaux, and Lyon on 2, 4 and 9 September. Most notable was the killing of 44 political prisoners near Château de Versailles transported from the High Court in Orléans back to Paris, the 9 September massacres. The next day Brissot wrote in "Le Patriote français", his newspaper: "No doubt you will be told that it is a vengeance of the people; it will be a slander. The people were not involved in this event."

== Role of officials ==
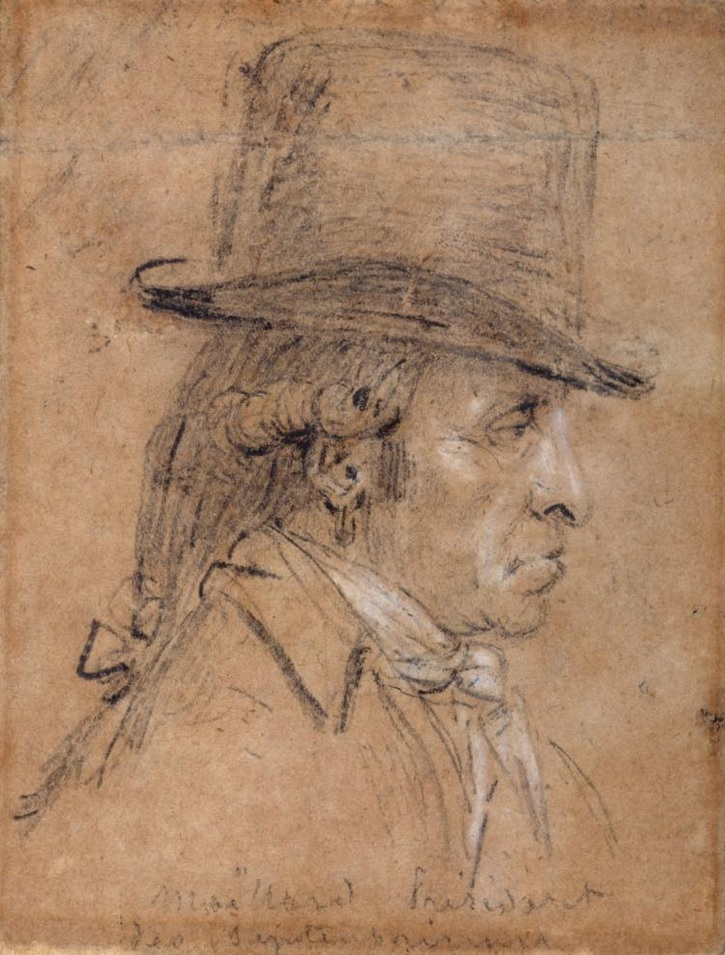
On 2 September Stanislas-Marie Maillard and his gang were present at the Abbaye and Carmes. As the president of the tribunal he signed the death sentences.

According to Timothy Tackett: "For a period of some 48 hours between the 29th and 31 August, the whole of Paris was systematically searched by the national guard for lurking conspirators and hidden arms. By that time section assemblies were already passing motions demanding "the death of conspirators before the departure of citizens". On 31 August the Committee of Vigilance was created with Panis and Sergent-Marceau. According to Madame de Staël on 31 August "it was already known, that only those who were destined to be massacred were sent to that prison [of the Abbey]."

On 1 September the Commune declared a state of emergency by decreeing that on the following day the tocsin should be rung, all able-bodied citizens convened in the Champ de Mars.

On Sunday 2 September the 1792 French National Convention election started. Robespierre publicly accused Brissot and the Brissotins of plotting with the Duke of Brunswick. Marat was appointed as one of the six additional members of the Committee of Vigilance, but without the approval of the Executive Council. According to Adolphe Thiers on 2 September: "The keeper of the Abbaye sent away his children in the morning. Dinner was served to the prisoners two hours before the accustomed time, and the knives were taken from their plates."

Such municipal and central government as existed in Paris in September 1792 was preoccupied with organizing volunteers, supplies, and equipment for the armies on the threatened frontiers. Accordingly, there was no attempt to assuage popular fears that the understaffed and easily accessed prisons were full of royalists who would break out and seize the city when the national guards and other citizen volunteers had left for the war. According to Madame Roland. Danton responded to an appeal to protect the prisoners with the comment: "To hell with the prisoners! They must look after themselves." On 3 September. Roland, her husband, said: "Yesterday was a day that we should perhaps throw a veil on." The other members of the provisional government – Clavière, Lebrun-Tondu, Monge and Servan, involved in organizing the country did not do much to stop the killing, or could not foresee or prevent these excesses. Mayor Pétion de Villeneuve turned a blind eye when he visited Bicêtre. Olympe de Gouges and Brissot's newspaper were the only ones condemning the September murders.

== Aftermath ==
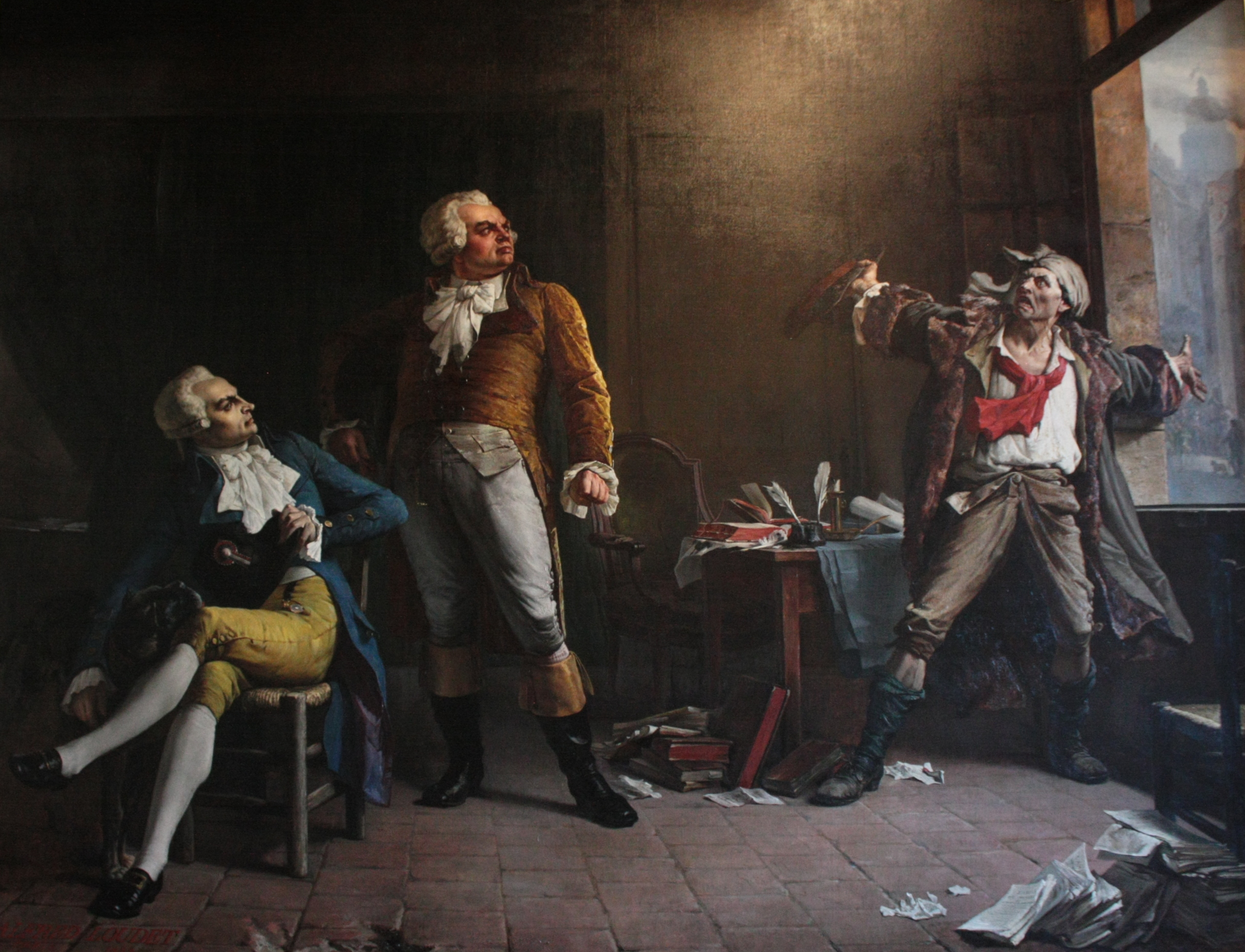
Imaginary meeting between Robespierre, Danton and Marat (illustrating Victor Hugo's novel Ninety-Three) by Alfred Loudet

=== Political repercussions ===
The Brissotins in the Convention first attacked Danton; he was asked to resign as minister on 25 October but was forced to step down on 9 October. He kept his seat in the Convention as deputy. Then the Brissotins decided to attack Robespierre and Marat.

On 29 October the Convention reviewed these recent events. Jean-Baptiste Louvet de Couvray accused Robespierre of creating a personality cult, governing the Paris "Conseil General" and paying the "Septembriseurs". Marat was accused of being asocial and establishing a dictatorship. He was taken by surprise and had to be defended by Danton. Robespierre was given eight days to reply. On 5 November Robespierre stated that Marat had visited him only once since January. He insisted that most of the victims were aristocrats, which was not the case. He admitted the arrests at the end of August were illegal, as illegal as the revolution, the fall of the monarchy and the Bastille. He asked the convention: "Citizens, did you want a revolution without revolution?" Robespierre, Danton, and Marat insisted that the "new bloodletting" had been a spontaneous popular movement. Their opponents, the Girondins, spoke of a systematically planned conspiracy. Louvet de Couvrai who published his speech was no longer admitted to the Jacobin Club.

The massacres first damaged the political position of the Girondins, who seemed too moderate, and later the Jacobins, who seemed too bloodthirsty. A new mayor, Nicolas Chambon, was installed on 1 December 1792. On 4 February 1793 Robespierre defended the September massacres as necessary. On 13 February Pierre Gaspard Chaumette received a list of victims in the La Force Prison. It was Servan's proposal to bring armed volunteers from the provinces. He was arrested during the Reign of Terror but was released in February 1795. In 1796, 24 or 39 craftsmen and small businessmen were accused; although only three were condemned.

=== Martyrs ===
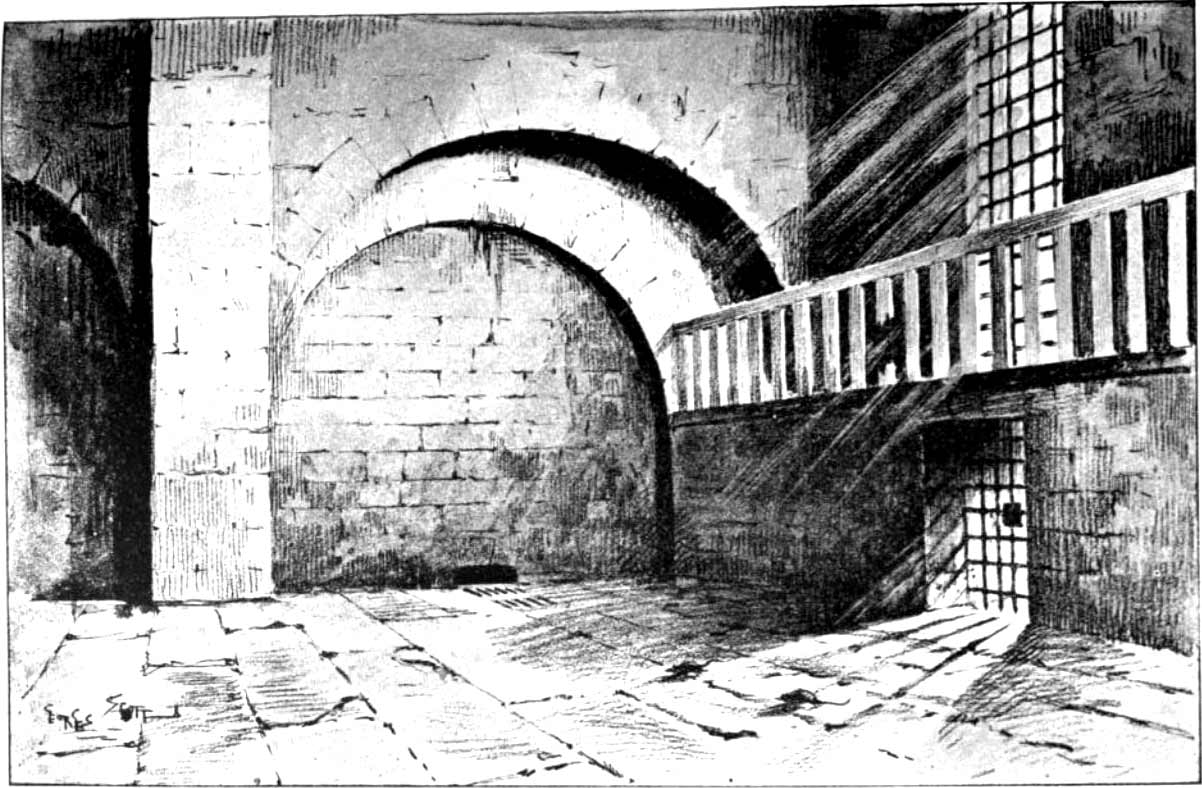
The abbey chapel in 1793.

One hundred fifteen clergy killed in the Carmes Prison were beatified by Pope Pius XI on 17 October 1926. Among the martyrs were Pierre-Louis de la Rochefoucauld, bishop of Saintes; Jean-Marie du Lau d'Alleman, archbishop of Arles; François-Joseph de la Rochefoucauld, bishop of Beauvais; and Ambroise Chevreux, the last superior-general of the monastic Congregation of Saint Maur.

== See also ==
- Louis XVI and the Legislative Assembly

== Notes and citations ==
=== Bibliography ===
- Blanc, Louis (1843). Histoire de la Révolution Française (in French). Vol. VII. "Fureurs de la Gironde". Langlois et Leclercq. OL 20454151M.
- Bluche, Frédéric (1986). Septembre 1792 : logiques d'un massacre (in French). ISBN 2-2210-4523-8. OL 2295103M.
- Caron, Pierre (1935). Les Massacres de Septembre (in French). La Maison du livre français. OL 10056222W.
- Furet, F.; Ozouf, M., eds. (1989). "A Critical Dictionary of the French Revolution" (PDF). p. 139.
- Granier de Cassagnac, Adolphe (1860). Histoire des Girondins et des massacres de septembre d'après les documents officiels et inédits, accompagnée de plusieurs fac-similé (in French).
- Israel, Jonathan (2014). Revolutionary Ideas: An Intellectual History of the French Revolution from The Rights of Man to Robespierre. pp. 267–277.
- Loomis, Stanley (1964). Paris in the Terror: June, Seventeen Ninety-Three to July, Seventeen Ninety-Four. New York: Dorset Press. ISBN 0-8802-9401-9. OL 8133427M.
- Schama, Simon (1992). Citizens: A Chronicle of the French Revolution.
