= Marie Gredeler =

French businesswoman (died 1792)

Marie Gredeler (died 1792) was a French businesswoman and accused murderer. She was murdered by a mob during the September Massacres in Paris. She was one of 37 women murdered during the September Massacres in Paris, and one of only two women killed outside of the La Salpêtrière; the other being the Princess de Lamballe.

== Life ==
Marie Gredeler was married to a man by the name Baptiste Gredeler. She separated from her husband, and supported herself selling umbrellas and walking sticks from a booth at the Palais Royal in Paris.

On 10 June 1792, she was arrested and charged with the murder and mutilation of her lover Joseph Pringault, a soldier in the French Guards. She was judged guilty as charged and sentenced to execution by hanging by the criminal tribunal of the 1st arrondissement of Paris. However, the high court annulled the verdict, and Marie Gredeler was still imprisoned in the Conciergerie, awaiting her final verdict, when the September Massacres took place.

=== Murder ===
During the September Massacres the Paris mob broke in to the prisons and institutions of the city, apprehended the inmates and released or massacred them. On the evening of 30 August, the mob entered the Conciergerie. The Conciergerie massacre was more uncontrolled than in the Prison de l'Abbaye, where the prison staff managed to keep some control and cooperation with the mob. In the case of the Conciergerie, the mob broke in via a side stairs, sidestepped the prison staff and unleashed an uninhibited massacre on the prisoners which continued throughout the night until the following morning. Of the 488 prisoners of the Conciergerie, 74 women and 36 men were released by the mob and 378 were killed, of whom Gredeler was the only female victim. Marie Gredeler was apprehended by the mob, tied to a pole, had her feet nailed to the ground and stabbed over her body with sabres - according to some versions, her breasts were mutilated - and had a fire lit under her with straw.

== Impact ==
The case of Marie Gredeler was somewhat unusual during the September Massacres in Paris. With the exception of the massacre on the 35 women of La Salpêtrière, the staff of the public institutions and prisons generally tried to protect women and few women were in fact killed in Paris. With the exception of the women of La Salpêtrière, only two women were killed in Paris during the September Massacres: Princess de Lamballe and Marie Gredeler. The sadistic torture and murder of Marie Gredeler made her one of the most infamous victims of the September Massacres.
