= Pierre Caron =

Pierre Caron may refer to:

- Pierre Caron (director) (1900–1971), French film director
- Pierre Caron (historian) (1875–1952), French historian and archivist
- Pierre Caron (politician) (born 1936), Liberal party member of the Canadian House of Commons
