= Louis Pierre Manuel =

French writer, municipal administrator of the police, and public prosecutor

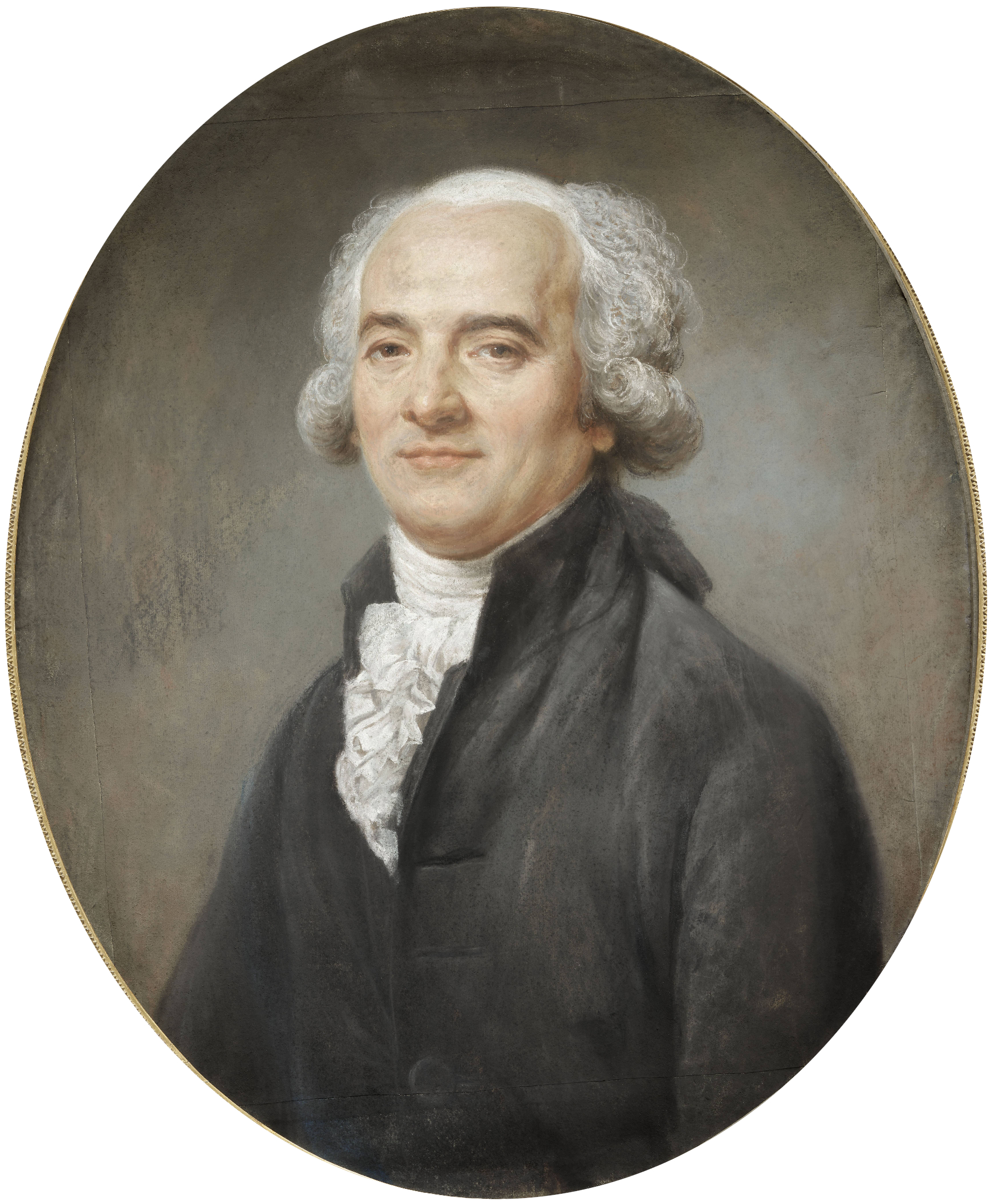
Portrait of Pierre-Louis Manuel by Joseph Ducreux, c. 1792

Louis Pierre Manuel (French pronunciation: [lwi pjɛʁ manɥɛl]; July 1751 – 14 November 1793) was a republican French writer, municipal administrator of the police, and public prosecutor during the French Revolution who was arrested, trialled and guillotined.

== Life ==
=== Revolutionary ===
He was born at Montargis, Loiret, and entered the Confraternity of Christian Doctrine, becoming tutor to the son of a Paris banker. In 1783 his clandestine pamphlet, Essais historiques, critiques, littéraires, et philosophiques, resulted in his being imprisoned in the Bastille.

Manuel, a man of letters passionately embraced the revolutionary ideas, and after the storming of the Bastille became a member of the provisional municipality of Paris, administrating the Garde Nationale and gendarme. Early December 1791 he was elected as procureur public of the commune, charged with both the investigation and prosecution of crime and representing the King. In a discussion about the right of veto (to suspend a law for a period or until the fulfillment of a condition) he told the Jacobins as a patriot he did not like the King, but he should have the right to leave or to abdicate. As Manuel was not from Paris he lost popularity. On 24 February 1792 Manuel was installed as procureur of the commune, gave a speech warning against anarchy. He proposed to sell the portraits of bishops hanging inside the building.

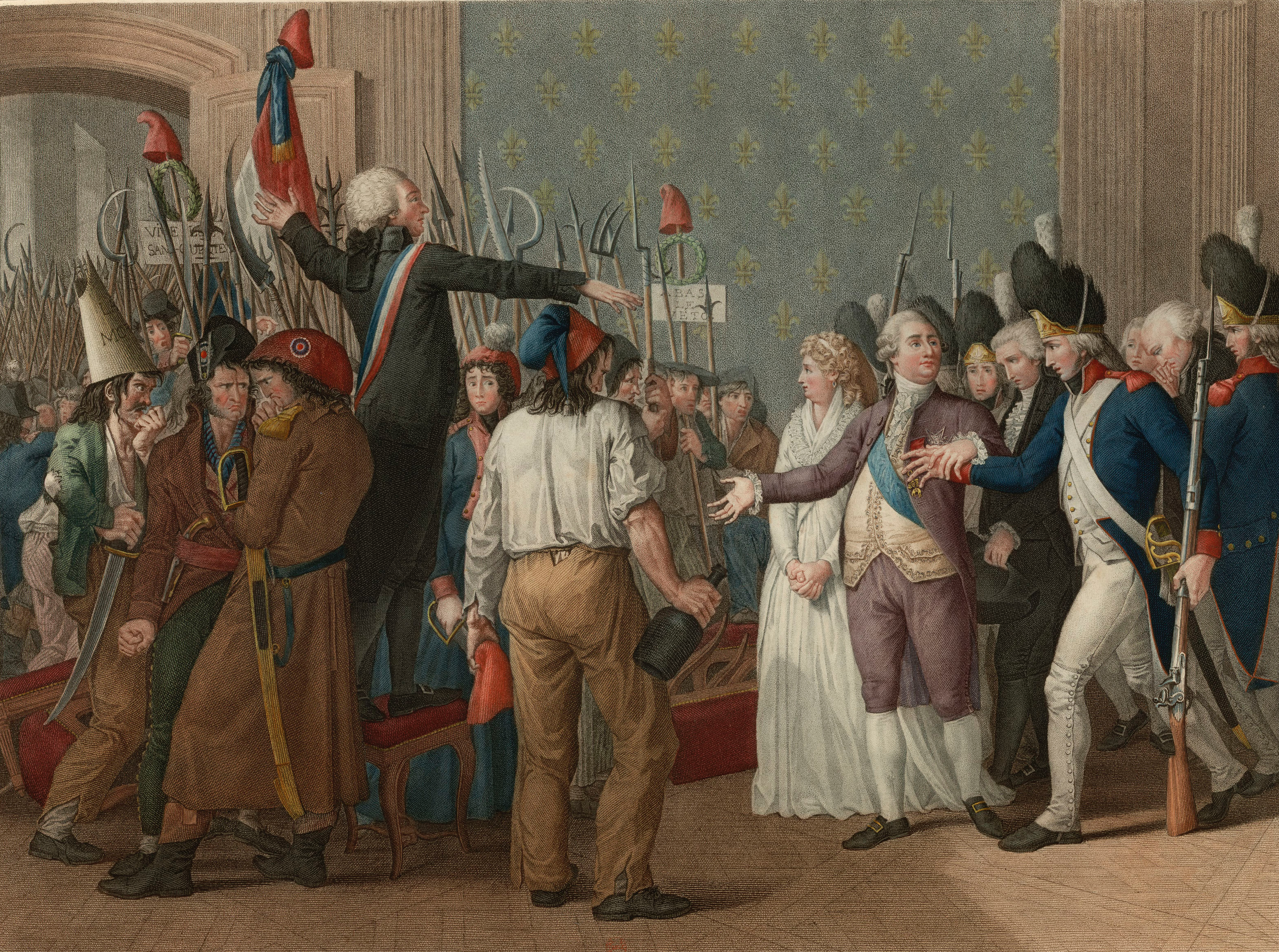
Demonstration of 20 June 1792 by Bouillon & Vérité

Manuel was associated with the Demonstration of 20 June 1792, which he visited as a private person. Afterwards he and Pétion de Villeneuve, the mayor were dismissed on 6 July by the Conseil Général, but reappointed on 23 July by the Assembly. During the 10 August storming of the Tuileries Palace, he was up all night and played a part in the formation of the insurrectionary Paris Commune which assured the success of the latter attack (begun by the taking of the Hôtel de Ville). On 12 August Robespierre and Manuel visited the Temple prison to check on the security of the royal family. Manuel and Pétion were against their imprisonment. At the end of the month and with a sense of martyrdom, Manuel or Robespierre seem to have ordered the sections to maintain their posts and die if necessary. On 28 August he helped Madame de Stael and released some of her friends. It is not clear if he saved the life of Beaumarchais who was jailed on the 23rd and released a week later, only three days before a massacre took place in the prison where he had been detained.

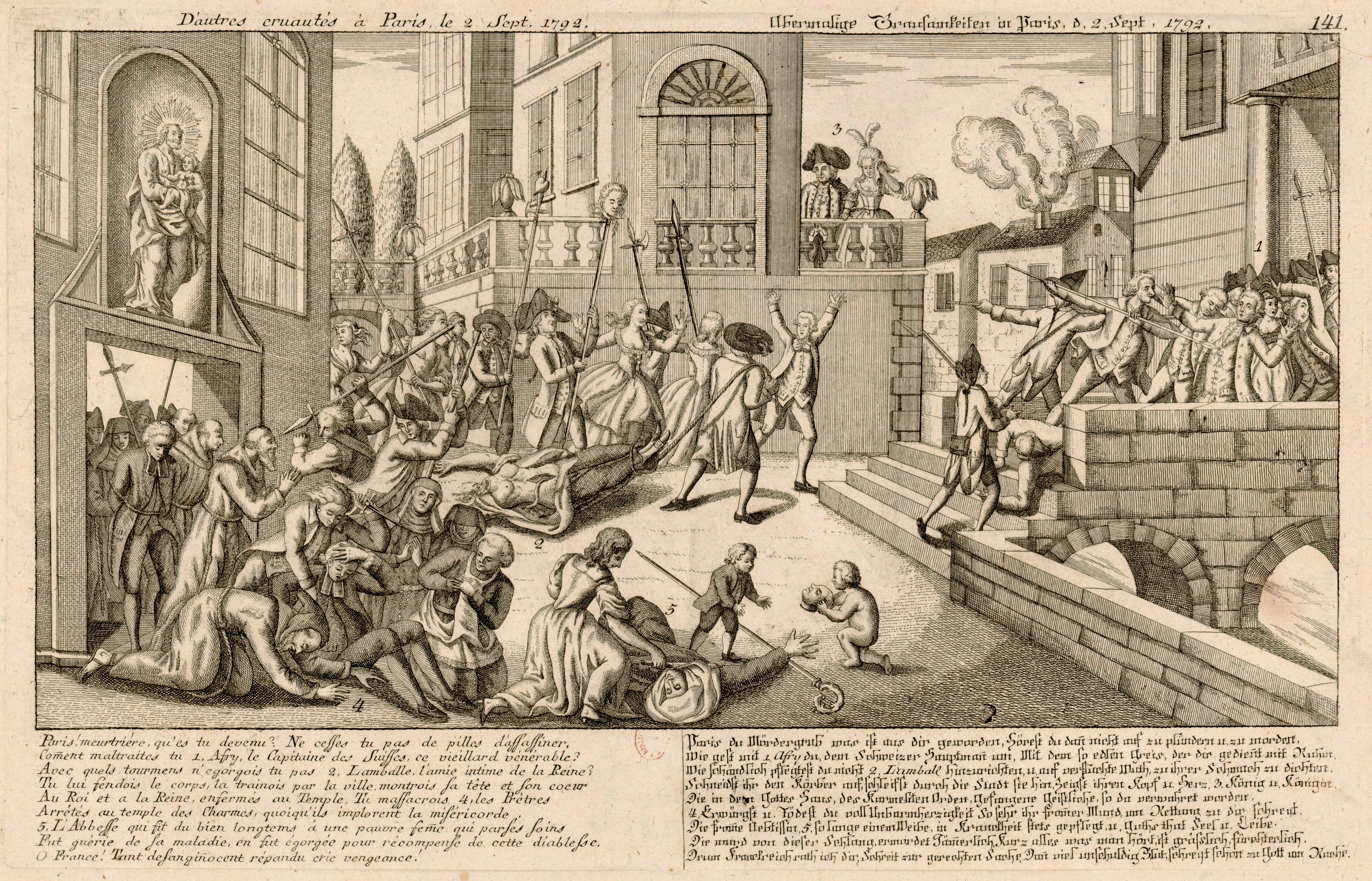
Contemporary engraving depicting some of the September Massacres

Manuel lived at Place Dauphine and was present at the nearby Abbaye Prison on the first day of the September Massacres. The door was closed, but the killing was resumed after an intense discussion with Manuel, on people's justice and failing judges. Manuel belonged to a deputation sent by the general council (Conseil général) of the commune to ask for compassion. They were insulted and escaped with their lives. Late in the evening, Madame de Stael was conveyed home, escorted by Manuel. He saved the life of governess Madame Tourzel, because of her mother.

On 7 September 1792, he was elected one of the deputies from Paris to the National Convention. On 3 November, he declared in the gallery of the Jacobin Club that "the massacres of September had been the Saint Bartholomew's Day of the people, who had shown themselves to be as wicked as a king, and that the whole of Paris was guilty of having suffered these assassinations.

He suppressed the award of the Cross of Saint Louis, which he called "a stain on a man's coat", requested that Pétion de Villeneuve, the first president of Convention be housed in the palace of the Tuileries, and demanded the sale of the Palace of Versailles.

=== Independent politics and execution ===
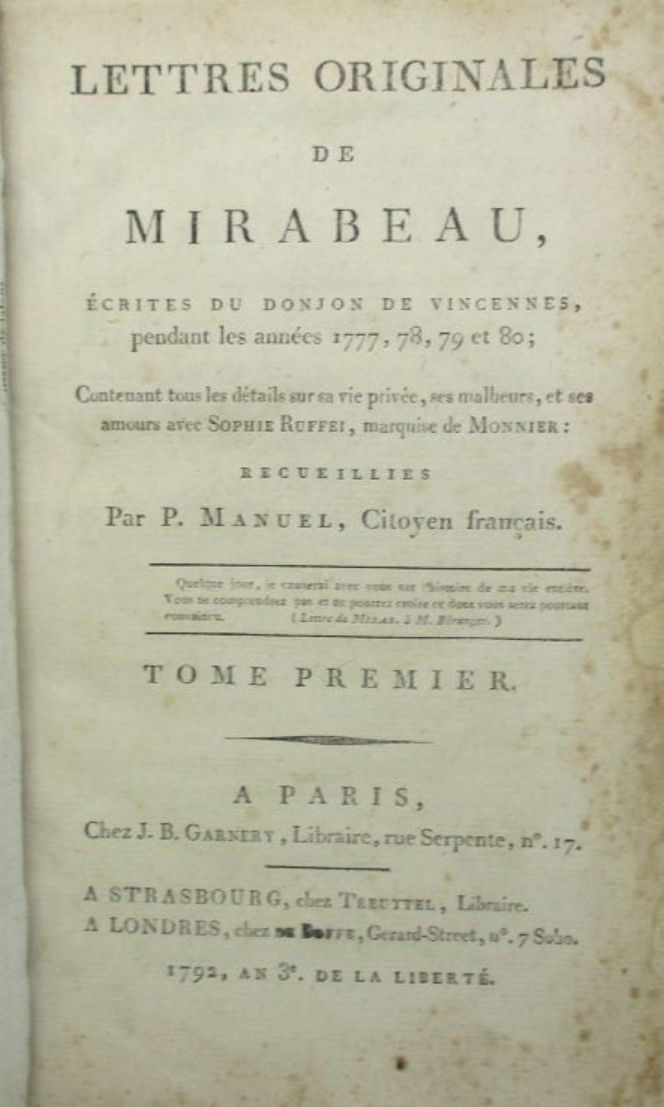
Title page of Volume 1 of the Lettres à Sophie by Mirabeau, edited by Manuel

In 1792 he was prosecuted for publishing four volumes of the fr: Lettres à Sophie, a collection of correspondence written between Honoré Gabriel Riqueti, comte de Mirabeau while he was incarcerated in the Vincennes dungeon, and Sophie de Monnier, his mistress, while she was confined in a convent in Gien. The letters were alleged to contain indecent content. He was acquitted.

Manuel changed his opinions on King Louis XVI through his connection with Pétion and the Brissotins. He refused to vote in favor of the execution of the former sovereign. Never before the Convention was like a court. He accused Montagnards of being anarchists and murderers. Consequently, he resigned as deputy and was succeeded as public prosecutor by Fouquier-Tinville. He retired to Montargis, where his house was attacked by a crowd on 14 March 1793. Heavily bleeding he was taken to the liberty tree, arrested, and put in prison almost naked. At the end of August he was transported to the Prison de l'Abbaye and on 13 November to the Conciergerie. In his trial Fouquier-Tinville accused him of being a libertine, offering wine to the "septembriseurs", stealing money and organizing a conspiracy against the one and indivisible republic. He was guillotined the same day, 14 November 1793.

== Works ==
- Manuel, Louis-Pierre (1783). Essais historiques, critiques, littéraires et philosophiques. p. 167.
- Lettre d'un garde du roi, pour servir de suite aux mémoires sur Cagliostro (1786)
- Manuel, Louis Pierre (1786). Coup-d'œil philosophique sur le règne de saint-Louis. p. 164.;
- Lettre a la reine (1789)
- Sur la séance nationale du vingt-cinq juin et lettre à Monsieur le comte d'Artois sur la séance royale du 23 (1789)
- Seconde lettre à Monsieur le comte d'Artois (1789)
- Le nobiliaire des trois ordres (1789)
- Manuel, Louis-Pierre (1789). L'année françoise. p. 154.;
- Manuel, Louis-Pierre (1789). L'année françoise.;
- Louis-Pierre Manuel (1789). La Bastille dévoilée: livr. Notes historiques sur la Bastille. Desenne. According to the bibliographer Antoine-Alexandre Barbier, in his Dictionnaire des ouvrages anonymes et pseudonymes, Volume 1, the pamphlet was not written by Manuel, as often cited, but by a Charpentier.
- Lettre a Monsieur, frere du roi (1791)
- Lettre de M. Manuel, procureur de la Commune de Paris, aux ministres (1791)
- La Police de Paris dévoilée. Tome premier'Tome second, avec gravure et tableau (1791)
- Lettres sur la Révolution (1792).
- Le trone des Français ne s'emporte pas. lettre superbe & extraordinaire de M. Manuel, procureur de la Commune de Paris, au roi (1792)
- P. Manuel a ses concitoyens (1793)
- P. Manuel aux officiers municipaux de Montargis (1793)
- Opinion de P. Manuel, sur la premiere question, pour le jugement de Louis XVI (1793)
