= Tournelle =

In French, a Tournelle (=small tower) may refer to:

- Some parliaments, and tribunals at the time of the kingdom of France. This name is used, because the judges worked à tour de rôle (each after another).

Two different buildings in different quarters of Paris in france:

- Château de la Tournelle, a castle of the Wall of Philip II Augustus, on the left bank of Seine river, upstream Paris. Now destroyed. This castle gave its name to :
  - Pont de la Tournelle (=Tournelle bridge), at the place of the castle, across Seine river
  - Quai de la Tournelle, the street along the river at the place of the castle
  - Port de la Tournelle, a small harbour which was used to unload goods and especially timbers floating along the river
- Hôtel des Tournelles, a small medieval palace sometimes used by the king and his family when living in Paris. On the right bank. From the 14th to the 16th century. It was abandoned then destroyed, because the king Henri II of France was mortally wounded near the palace and died in it. It gave its name to the :
  - Rue des Tournelles, street in Paris, France
