= Claude Vellefaux =

French architect

Claude Vellefaux (French pronunciation: [klod vɛlfo]) was a 16th/17th-century French architect, who had the Hôpital Saint-Louis built in 1611 at the request of Henry IV of France.

== Biography ==
Vellefaux was qualified as a master mason in 1585, sworn by the king as responsible of masonry works and topographer for Mr. Prince de Conti, in 1611, great topographer of Saint-Germain-des-Prés, sworn mason controller of the buildings of the Hôtel-Dieu, in 1625.

Before 1610, he married Laurence Hébert, daughter of a merchant living in Saint-Germain-des-Prés and had three daughters: one, Laurence married a king's doctor, Valentin Hieraulme and the other, Anne, joined Gilles Sanglier, squire, lord of Noblaye in Touraine. The third, Étiennette Vellefaux, married architect Christophe Gamard who succeeded his father-in-law as seer of the abbey Saint-Germain-des-Prés.

He also contributed to many works in the City Hall of Paris.

He worked mainly in the environment of the Abbey of Saint-Germain-des-Prés, but also on buildings of the Hôtel-Dieu de Paris, between 1605 and 1625. With François Quesnel, he drew up the plan of the new district of Luxembourg in 1615.

He was the first builder of the Hôpital Saint-Louis, on the plans of Claude Chastillon and François Quesnel, in 1607.

He probably built the house he lived at #15 Rue de Buci.

He had a building erected and then lived in the Rue de Seine in Paris. He made his will in 1625 and probably died in January 1629 since the notary Saint Vaast made his inventory on 7 February 1629.

He gave his name to a street of the 10th arrondissement of Paris adjoining this hospital, rue Claude-Vellefaux, later renamed avenue Claude-Vellefaux.
