= Christophe Gamard =

French architect

Christophe Gamard, Gamar or Gamart, was a 17th-century French architect, who worked in Paris and died there in 1649.

== Biography ==
He was a master mason in 1613, an architect of the old Saint-Sulpice in 1623 (and began its reconstruction after 1643), and a city juror (juré de la Ville) in 1626. He was an assistant of Claude Vellefaux, the supervising architect (architecte voyer) of the Abbey of Saint-Germain-des-Prés, and succeeded him in that position in 1627. He became an architect of the king (architecte du roi) in 1639.

=== Family ===
He married Claude Vellefaux's daughter, Étiennette Vellefaux. They had two sons, Christophe and Hubert. Widowed, he married Marie Gillier in 1648, despite the opposition of his sons.

His brother, Philippot Gamard, worked on the Hotel de Nemours, rue Séguier, in 1620, and at houses, current rues de Sévigné and Rue des Trois-Portes between 1616 and 1619.

== Works ==
- Houses in rue de la Cerisaie in 1613, rue de Seine in 1614, rue de Buci where he had his own house at number 27 in 1631
- The enlargement of the nave of the former Saint-Sulpice church by adding side chapels, between 1614 and 1631
- The Pont au Double, between 1626 and 1631, on the small arm of the Seine to connect the buildings of the Hôtel-Dieu located on the île de la Cité with those on the left bank. He succeeded his father-in-law as architect of the Hôtel-Dieu de Paris and created the Rosary Room and the great portal of the rue de la Bûcherie, between 1626 and 1635
- The Prison de l'Abbaye, dependence of justice of the abbot of Saint-Germain-des-Prés, built between 1631 and 1635.
- The Hospice des Incurables (now the Hôpital Laennec de Paris), between 1633 and 1640, at the request of Cardinal de La Rochefoucauld and Marguerite de Rouillé. He was the architect of the hospice until his death.
- The fountain on the parvis, located approximately 20 m from the north portal of the Cathédrale Notre-Dame de Paris, between 1636 and 1639
- The quai Malaquais after 1632
- Houses on the north side of rue Sainte-Marguerite (currently rue Gozlin), in 1635
- The vault of the sewer of the rue Saint-Benoît, in 1640
- The façade of the Église Saint-André-des-Arts in 1640
- The south side portal, Sainte-Marguerite portal, the rib vaults, the high capitals of the central vessel of the abbey Church of Saint-Germain-des-Prés, between 1646 and 1649
- The new church of Saint-Sulpice for which he provided the plans in 1636, and, after their approval in 1645, began construction by the Chapel of the Virgin in 1646 and continued it until his death

== Bibliography ==
- Jean-Marie Pérouse de Montclos (dir.), Le Guide du patrimoine de Paris, Paris, Hachette, 1995, p. 587 ISBN 9782010168123, p. 186, 446, 495, 514.
- Bernard Oudin, Dictionnaire des architectes, Paris, Seghers, (2nd edition), 1994, p. 664 ISBN 2-232-10398-6, p. 187.
