= Revue d'histoire moderne et contemporaine =

- Discipline: Contemporary history
- Language: French

Publication details
- History: 1899
- Publisher: Belin (France)

Standard abbreviations
- ISO 4: Rev. Hist. Mod. Contemp.

Indexing
- ISSN: 0048-8003 (print); 1776-3045 (web)

Links
- Journal homepage

The Revue d’histoire moderne et contemporaine ("Review of modern and contemporary history") is a three-monthly French academic journal covering the history of France. It was established in 1899 by Pierre Caron and Philippe Sagnac and is published by the Société d’histoire moderne et contemporaine.

== Title history ==
The journal was published under the title Revue d'histoire moderne et contemporaine from 1899 to 1914. From 1926-1940 the journal was published under the title Revue d'histoire moderne. Seven years later, the journal resumed under the title Etudes d'histoire moderne et contemporaine, published from 1947-1953. In 1954, the journal changed names back to Revue d'histoire moderne et contemporaine, and was published until 2011.
