= Louis-Marie Prudhomme =

French journalist (1752–1830)

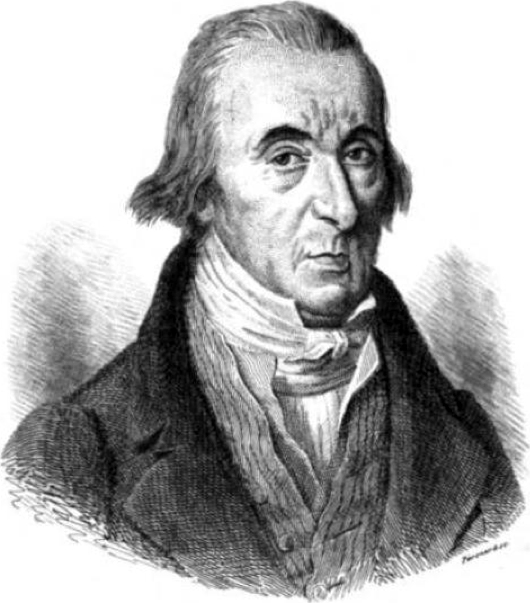
Portrait of Louis-Marie Prudhomme.

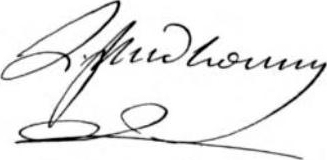
Prudhomme's signature.

Louis-Marie Prudhomme (French pronunciation: [lwi maʁi pʁydɔm]; 1752, Lyon, France – April 20, 1830, Paris, France) was a French journalist and historian.

A bookseller in Lyon, then in Paris, Prudhomme settled in Meaux as a bookbinder. He returned to Paris, and was arrested several times for his writings: between 1787 and 1789, he is thought to have written about 1,500 lampoons. Among them, ''Résumé général, ou Extrait des cahiers de pouvoirs, instructions, demandes ou doléances remis par divers bailliages, sénéchaussées et pays d’État du royaume, written in collaboration with Laurent de Mezières and Jean Rousseau and published in three volumes in 1789, which was seized by the police.

From July 12, 1789, to February 28, 1794, he published a newspaper, Révolutions de Paris (fr) ("Revolutions of Paris"), whose principal writer was Élisée Loustallot (fr), with Sylvain Maréchal, Pierre Gaspard Chaumette and Fabre d'Églantine, and which was a great success. At times imprisoned as a royalist, in June 1793, he moved away from Paris and the political life.

In 1796 he published a two-volume work that was a list of all persons known to him who were sent to death during the Reign of Terror. In 1797, he published l’Histoire générale et impartiale des erreurs, des fautes et des crimes commis pendant la Révolution française (6 volumes), work seized by the police. Then, from June–October 1799, he published 105 issues of a daily newspaper, le Voyageur.

In 1799, Prudhomme became director of the hospitals of Paris, but continued to work as a printer, publisher, and writer-compiler. Hostile to the First French Empire, he welcomed the Bourbon Restoration and in 1825 published L’Europe tourmentée par la Révolution de France, ébranlée par dix-huit années de promenades meurtrières de Napoléon Bonaparte, in two volumes. In the year of his death he published a two-volume dictionary of biographies of famous women.
