= Château de la Tournelle =

Parisian castle

Coordinates: 48.849883°N 2.354889°E

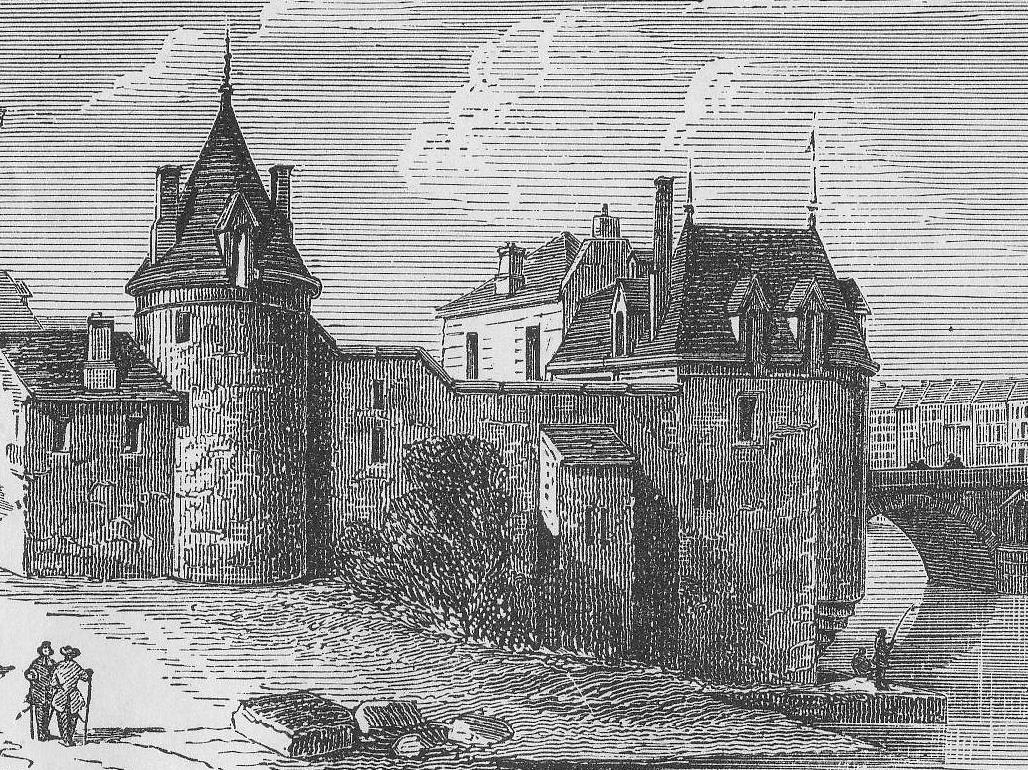
The Château de la Tournelle in the reign of Louis XIII

The Château de la Tournelle was a now-demolished castle on the left bank of the Seine in the 5th arrondissement of Paris on the quai de la Tournelle. The approximate site is now occupied by the restaurant La Tour d'Argent. After it were named the pont de la Tournelle and the quai de la Tournelle.

== History ==
The Château was built during the reign of Charles VI of France (1380-1422), and was named after its many 'tournelles' or little towers used to monitor the Seine River. The structure replaced the older Saint-Bernard watch tower which was part of the fortified enclosure of the capital built by Philippe II of France the early 13th century. The Château's primary function was as a military base to protect the city of Paris from invasion through the Seine, rather than acting as a private reside for the monarch.

Although monarch did not reside at the Château, Henry II of France died there in 1559 from wounds he received in a joust against Gabriel Montgomery. Devastated by the loss of her husband, and because she supposedly disliked the medieval style of the Château, the widowed Queen Catherine de' Medici declared the building be abandoned.

From 1632, at the advice of Saint Vincent de Paul, it was used to house prisoners condemned to work as rowers in galleys rather than remaining incarcerated at the Conciergerie.

== Gallery ==
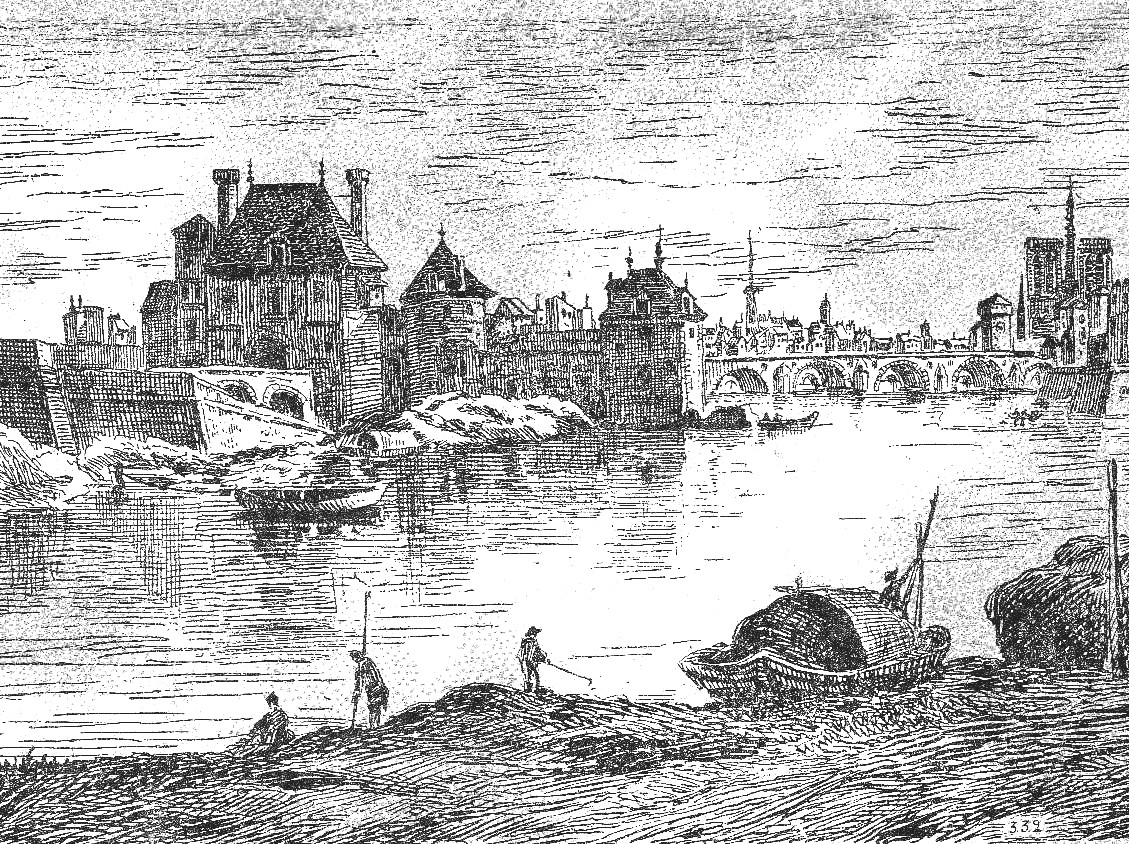
Quai and Porte Saint-Bernard, Château de la Tournelle and former Pont de la Tournelle in 1635

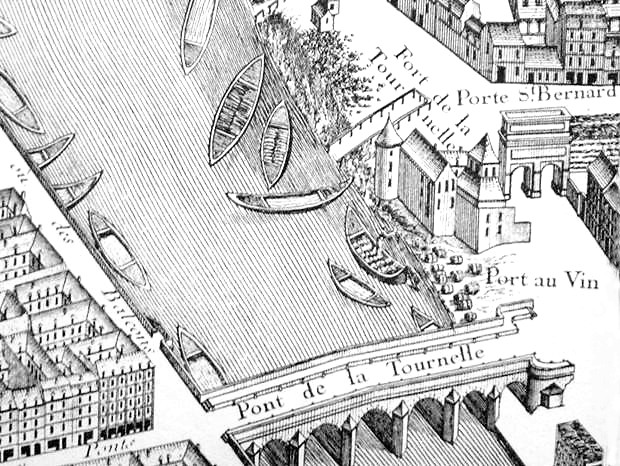
Area of the Château de la Tournelle in 1734

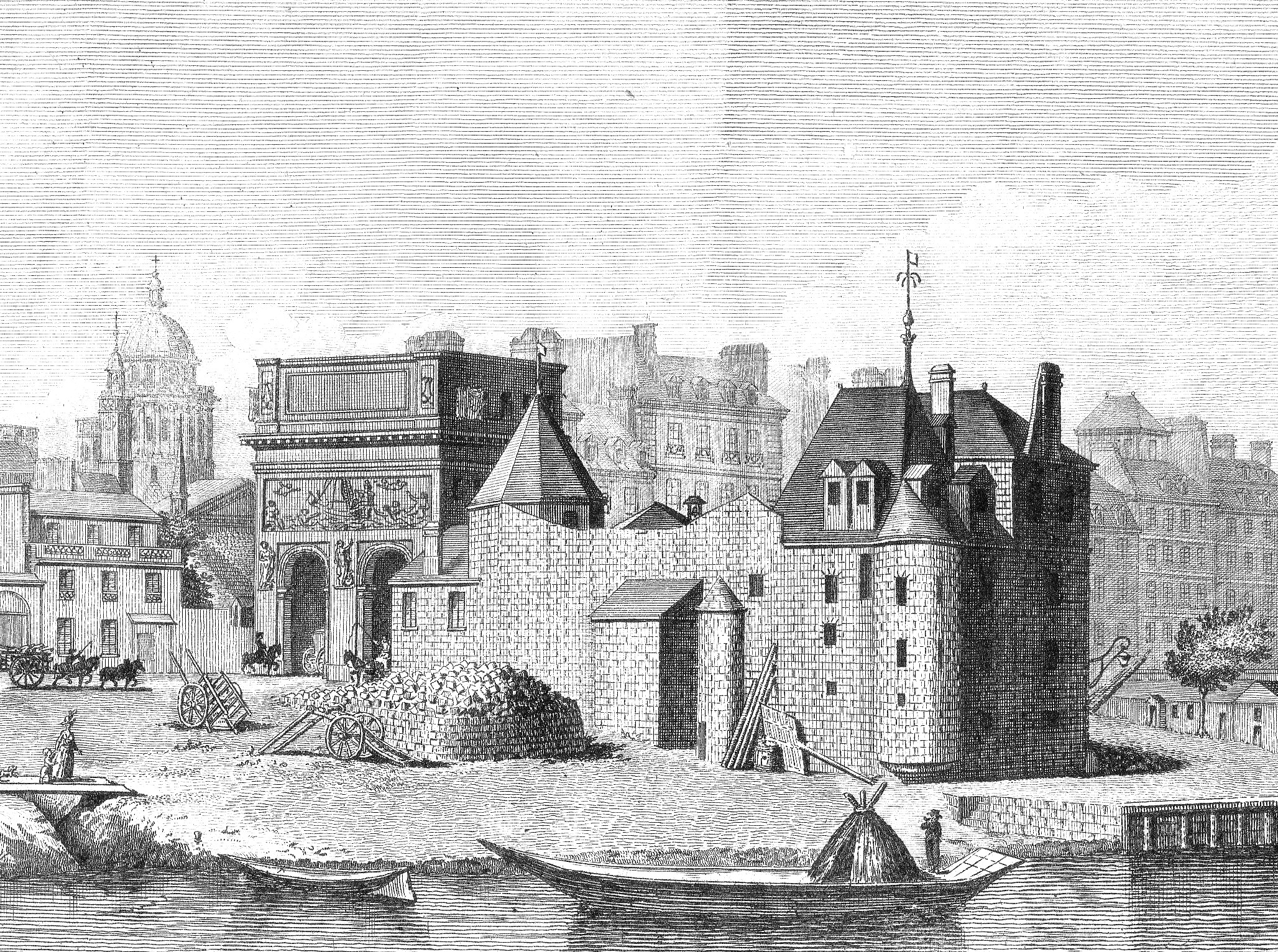
Porte Saint-Bernard and Château de la Tournelle around 1780
