= Prison de l'Abbaye =

Demolished prison in Paris, France

Coordinates: 48°51′11″N 2°20′06″E

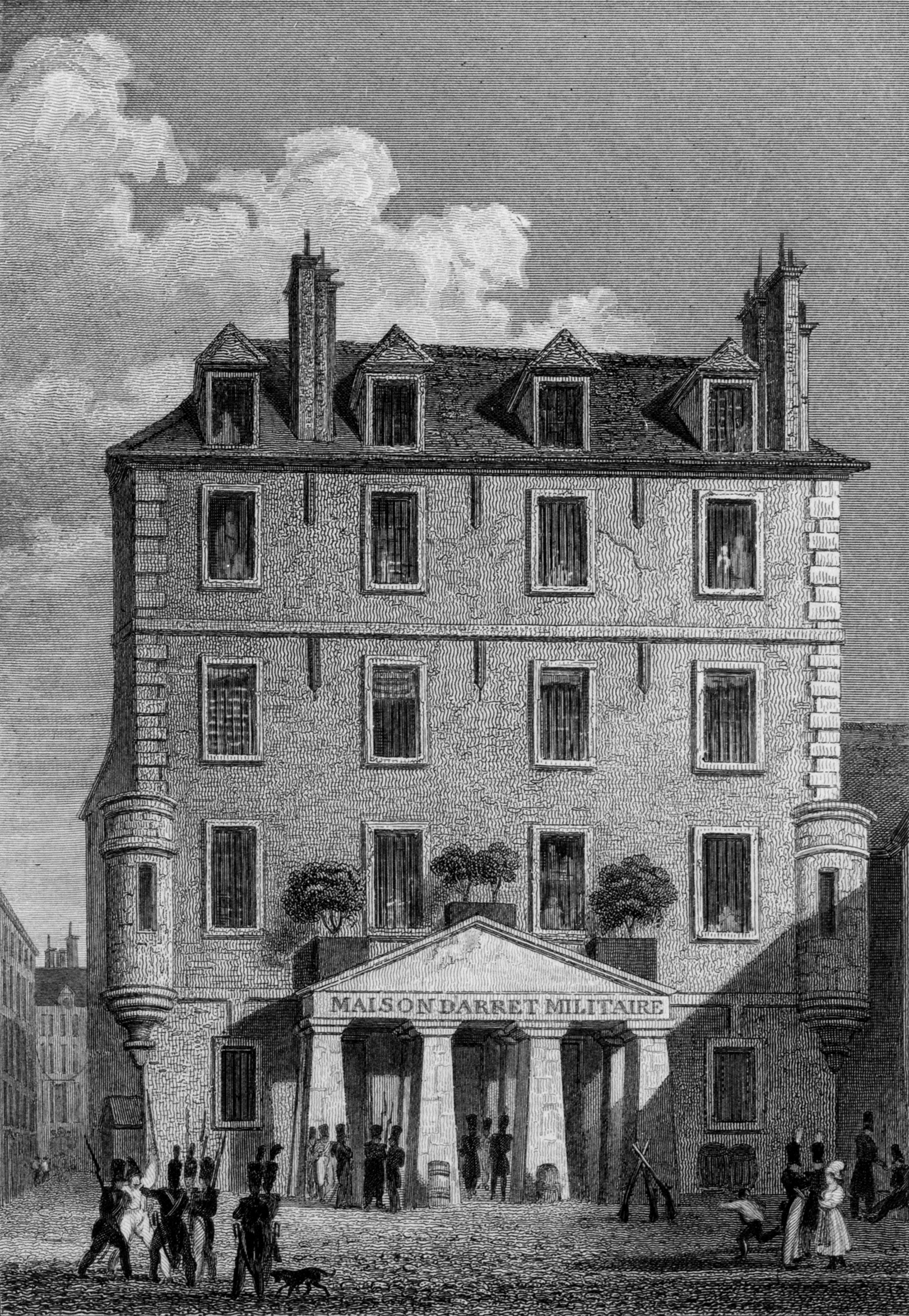
The Prison de l’Abbaye in 1831

The Prison de l’Abbaye was a Paris prison in use from 1522 to 1854. The final building was built by Christophe Gamard in 1631 and made up of three floors, flanked by two turrets (or more exactly, échauguettes). It was the scene of a portion of the September Massacres, one of the bloodiest episodes of the French Revolution. Twenty-two priests were given summary trials and then killed by mob outside the church.

Madame Roland, wife of the Girondin Minister of the Interior Jean-Marie Roland, was interned here on her first arrest in 1793 before being transferred to Sainte Pélagie.

== History ==
=== Pre-Revolution ===
It occupied part of the current site of Boulevard Saint-Germain in the SE corner of the enclosure of the Abbey of Saint-Germain-des-Prés. The abbey dated to the earliest era of Paris, when Childebert I (on the site of a temple to Isis or Ceres, according to legend) founded a monastery dedicated to the Holy Cross and to St Vincent of Saragossa, which later took the name of its administering bishop Germain of Paris. Its basilica became known as "Saint-Denis of the Merovingians", since it contained the tombs of Childebert I and others of the dynasty.

=== Massacres ===
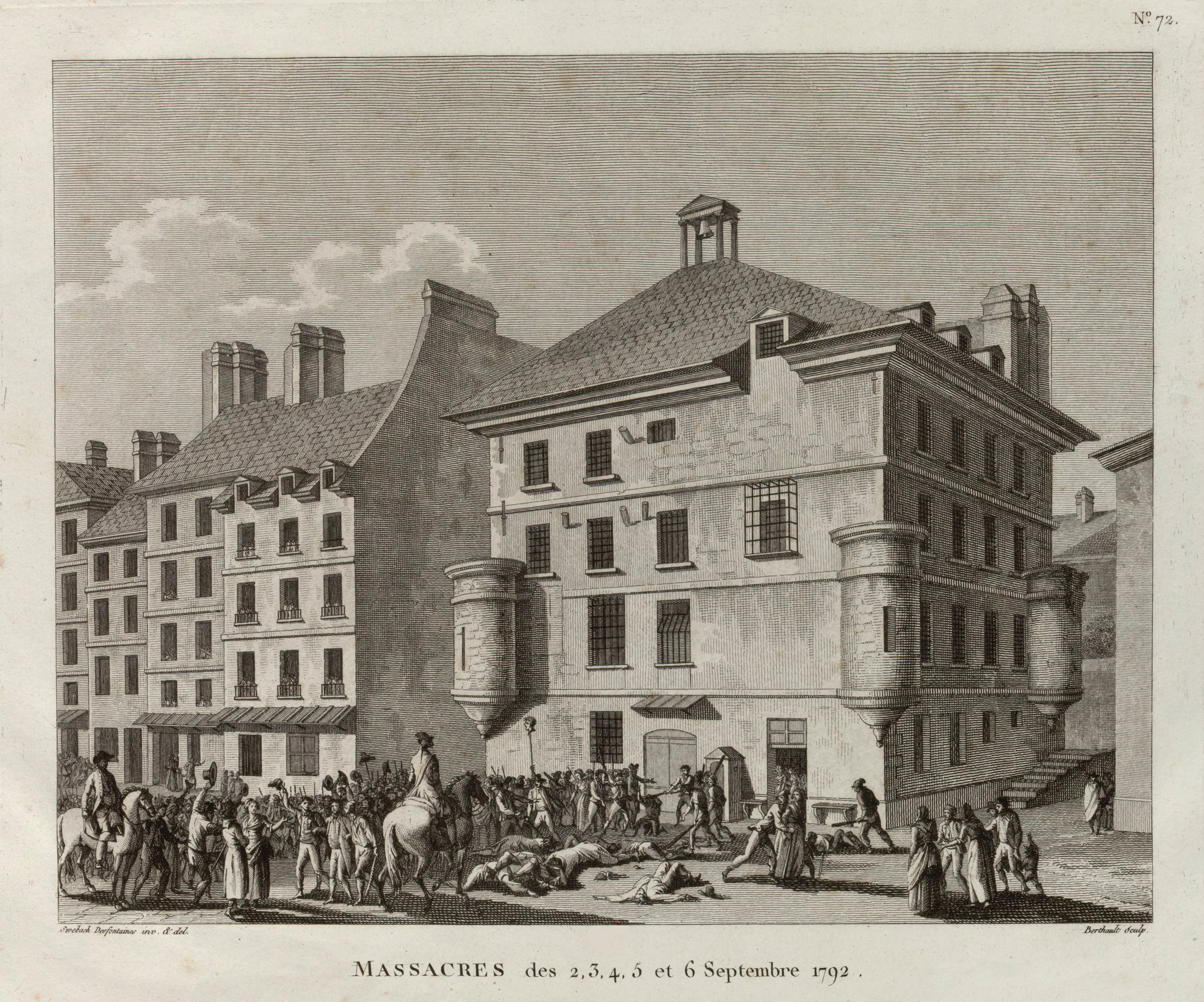
Prison de l'Abbaye where between 2 and 4 September 1792 160-220 people, including a group of twenty-two priests, were killed in three days. It was located between Rue de Bussi and Rue du Four (E40), with the entrance on Rue Sainte-Marguerite, today Boulevard Saint-Germain.

=== Destruction ===
The prison de l’Abbaye was later transformed into a military prison and was finally demolished in 1854 for the construction of boulevard Saint-Germain.

== Bibliography ==
- Favier, Jean; et al., editors (1988). Chronique de la Révolution. Paris: Larousse; Éditions Jacques Legrand. ISBN 2-03-503250-4.
