= Pierre Caron (historian) =

French historian and archivist (1875–1952)

Pierre Caron (19 June 1875, Versailles – 19 January 1952, Paris) was a French historian and archivist, specialising in the French Revolution.

== Life ==
Entering the Archives nationales in 1898 and setting up the Revue d'histoire moderne et contemporaine soon afterwards, he published several bibliographic works. He headed the Archives from 1937 to 1941, during which time (in 1939) he led the 150th anniversary celebrations of the French Revolution, During the Battle of France he remained in Paris with his administration to safeguard his collections. He retired in 1941 and after the Second World War he was made a member of the Comité d’histoire de l’Occupation et de la libération de la France (CHOLF), which in 1951 became the Comité d’histoire de la Seconde Guerre mondiale.

== Publications ==
Additional information needed

- Thesis : Noël Beda
- Le Commerce des céréales, 1907
- Tableaux de dépréciation du papier-monnaie, 1909
- Paris pendant la terreur : rapports des agents secrets du ministre de l'intérieur, 1910
- Les papiers des comités militaires de la Constituante, de la Législative et de la Convention (1789-an IV), 1912
- Manuel pratique pour l'étude de la révolution française, 1912, réédité cinq fois jusqu’en 1947
- Bibliographie des travaux publiés de 1866 à 1897 sur l'histoire de la France depuis 1789, 1912, réédité quatre fois jusqu’en 1974
- Comités militaires de la Constituante, de la Législative et de la Convention, 1913
- Commission de subsistance de l’An II, 1924
- La première terreur, 1792
- Le Maximum général, 1930
- Massacres de septembre 1792, 1936 (réédité deux fois)
- Liste mondiale des périodiques et bibliographies historiques, 1940
- La Délégation française auprès de la Commission allemande d'armistice
- Les missions du Conseil exécutif provisoire et de la Commune de Paris dans l'Est et le Nord, août-novembre 1792, 1953
- with Philippe Sagnac, Les comités des droits féodaux et de législation et l'abolition du régime seigneurial (1789–1793), published five times from 1907 to 1977
