= Feminism in France =

Feminism in France is the history of feminist thought and movements in France. Feminism in France can be roughly divided into three waves: First-wave feminism from the French Revolution through the Third Republic which was concerned chiefly with suffrage and civic rights for women. Significant contributions came from revolutionary movements of the French Revolution of 1848 and Paris Commune, culminating in 1944 when women gained the right to vote.

Second-wave feminism began in the 1940s as a reevaluation of women's role in society, reconciling the inferior treatment of women in society despite their ostensibly equal political status to men. Pioneered by theorists such as Simone de Beauvoir, second wave feminism was an important current within the social turmoil leading up to and following the May 1968 events in France. Political goals included the guarantee of increased bodily autonomy for women via increased access to abortion and birth control.

Third-wave feminism since the 2000s continues the legacy of the second wave while adding elements of postcolonial feminism, approaching women's rights in tandem with other ongoing discourses, particularly those surrounding racism.

== First-wave feminism ==
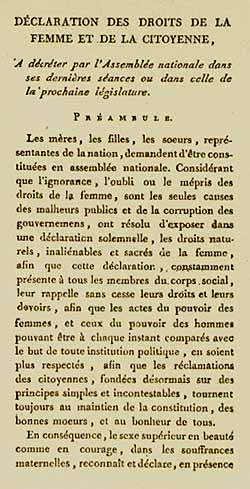
First page of Declaration of the Rights of Woman and of the Female Citizen

=== The French Revolution ===
In November 1789, at the very beginning of the French Revolution, the Women's Petition was addressed to the National Assembly but not discussed. Although various feminist movements emerged during the Revolution, most politicians followed Rousseau's theories as outlined in Emile, which confined women to the roles of mother and spouse. The philosopher Condorcet was a notable exception who advocated equal rights for both sexes.

The Société fraternelle de l'un et l'autre sexe ("Fraternal Society of Both Sexes") was founded in 1790 by Claude Dansart. It included prominent individuals such as Etta Palm d'Aelders, Jacques Hébert, Louise-Félicité de Kéralio, Pauline Léon, Théroigne de Méricourt, Madame Roland, Thérésa Cabarrús, and Merlin de Thionville. The following year, Olympe de Gouges published the Declaration of the Rights of Woman and of the Female Citizen. This was a letter addressed to Queen Marie Antoinette which requested actions in favour of women's rights. Gouges was guillotined two years later, days after the execution of the Girondins.

In February 1793, Pauline Léon and Claire Lacombe created the exclusively-female Société des républicaines révolutionnaires (Society of Revolutionary Republicans—the final e in républicaines explicitly denoting Republican Women), which boasted two hundred members. Viewed by the historian Daniel Guérin as a sort of "feminist section of the Enragés", they participated in the fall of the Girondins. Lacombe advocated giving weapons to women. However, the Society was outlawed by the revolutionary government in the following year.

=== From the Restoration to the Second Republic ===
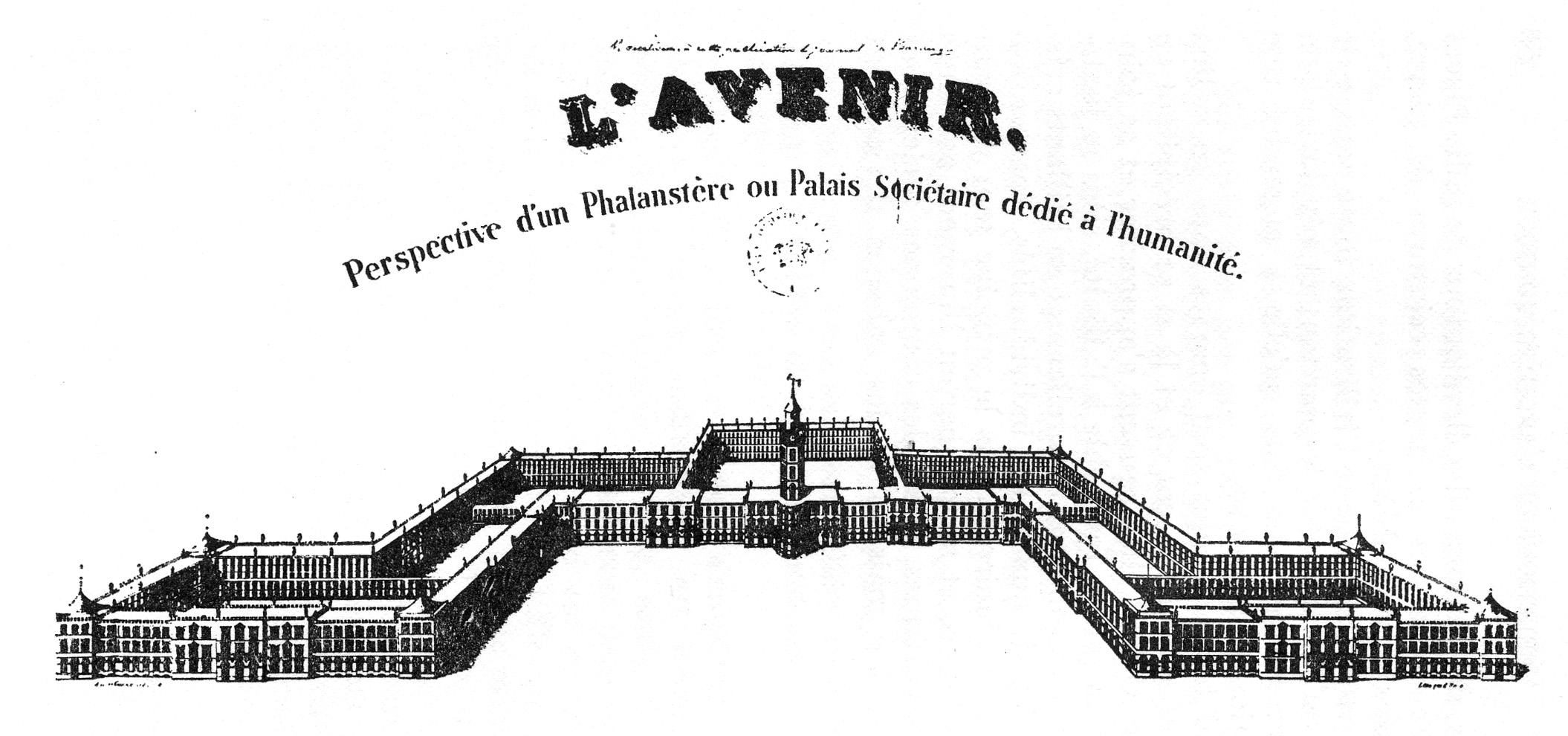
Perspective view of the urban area of Fourier's phalanstery

The feminist movement expanded again in Socialist movements of the Romantic generation, in particular among Parisian Saint Simonians. Women freely adopted new lifestyles, inciting indignation in public opinion. They claimed equality of rights and participated in the abundant literary activity, such as Claire Démar's Appel au peuple sur l'affranchissement de la femme (1833), a feminist pamphlet. On the other hand, Charles Fourier's Utopian Socialist theory of passions advocated "free love." His architectural model of the phalanstery community explicitly took into account women's emancipation.

The Bourbon Restoration re-established the prohibition of divorce in 1816. When the July Monarchy restricted the political rights of the majority of the population, the feminist struggle rejoined the Republican and Socialist struggle for a "Democratic and Social Republic," leading to the 1848 Revolution and the proclamation of the Second Republic. The 1848 Revolution became the occasion of a public expression of the feminist movement, who organized itself in various associations. Women's political activities led several of them to be proscribed as the other Forty-Eighters.

=== Belle Époque Era ===
During the culturally thriving times of the Belle Époque, especially in the late nineteenth century, feminism and the view of femininity experienced substantial shifts evident through acts by women of boldness and rejection of previous stigmas. The most defining characteristic of this period shown by these actions is the power of choice women began to take hold of. Such acts included these women partaking in nonstandard ways of marriage—as divorce during this time had been legally reinstalled as a result of the Naquet Laws—practicing gender role-defying jobs, and profoundly influencing societal ideologies regarding femininity through writings.

Feminist newspapers quickly became more widespread and took a role in transforming both the view of women and their rights. As this era held promise of equality, proceeding after the French Revolution, women still had yet to gain the title of equal citizens, making it a difficult and dangerous venture to publicize opinions promoting the advancement of women's rights. Among these newspapers, the most notable is Marguerite Durand's La Fronde, run entirely by women.

=== The Commune and the Union des Femmes ===
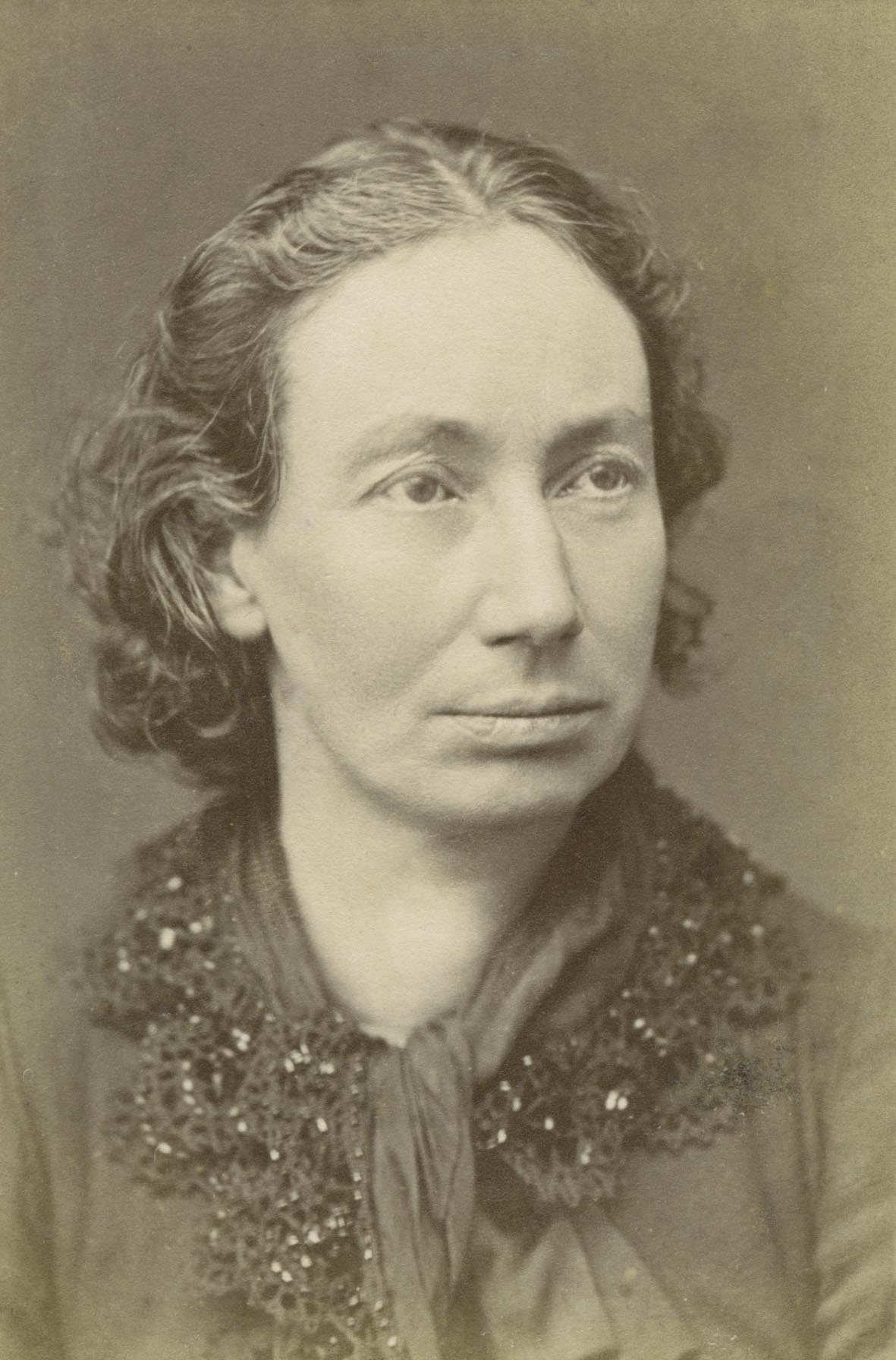
Louise Michel

Some women organized a feminist movement during the Commune, following up on earlier attempts in 1789 and 1848. Nathalie Lemel, a socialist bookbinder, and Élisabeth Dmitrieff, a young Russian exile and member of the Russian section of the First International (IWA), created the Union des femmes pour la défense de Paris et les soins aux blessés ("Women's Union for the Defense of Paris and Care of the Injured") on 11 April 1871. The feminist writer André Léo, a friend of Paule Minck, was also active in the Women's Union. The association demanded gender equality, wage equality, right of divorce for women, and right to secular and professional education for girls. They also demanded suppression of the distinction between married women and concubines, between legitimate and natural children, the abolition of prostitution in closing the maisons de tolérance, or legal official brothels.

The Women's Union also participated in several municipal commissions and organized cooperative workshops. Along with Eugène Varlin, Nathalie Le Mel created the cooperative restaurant La Marmite, which served free food for indigents, and then fought during the Bloody Week on the barricades. On the other hand, Paule Minck opened a free school in the Church of Saint Pierre de Montmartre, and animated the Club Saint-Sulpice on the Left Bank. The Russian Anne Jaclard, who declined to marry Dostoievsky and finally became the wife of Blanquist activist Victor Jaclard, founded with André Léo the newspaper La Sociale. She was also a member of the Comité de vigilance de Montmartre, along with Louise Michel and Paule Minck, as well as of the Russian section of the First International. Victorine Brocher, close to the IWA activists and founder of a cooperative bakery in 1867, also fought during the Commune and the Bloody Week.

Famous figures such as Louise Michel, the "Red Virgin of Montmartre" who joined the National Guard and would later be sent to New Caledonia, symbolize the active participation of a small number of women in the insurrectionary events. A female battalion from the National Guard defended the Place Blanche during the repression.

=== The suffragettes ===
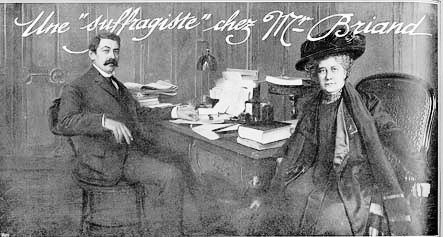
Jeanne Schmahl visiting the French Premier Aristide Briand in 1909

In 1909, French noblewoman and feminist Jeanne-Elizabeth Schmahl founded the French Union for Women's Suffrage to advocate for women's right to vote in France.

Despite some cultural changes following World War I, which had resulted in women replacing the male workers who had gone to the front, they were known as the Années folles and their exuberance was restricted to a very small group of female elites. Victor Margueritte's La Garçonne (The Flapper, 1922), depicting an emancipated woman, was seen as scandalous and caused him to lose his Legion of Honour.

During the Third Republic, the suffragettes movement championed the right to vote for women, but did not insist on the access of women to legislative and executive offices. The suffragettes, however, did honour the achievements of foreign women in power by bringing attention to legislation passed under their influence concerning alcohol (such as Prohibition in the United States), regulation of prostitution, and protection of children's rights.

Despite this campaign and the new role of women following World War I, the Third Republic declined to grant them voting rights, mainly because of fear of the influence of clericalism among them, echoing the conservative vote of rural areas for Louis-Napoleon Bonaparte during the Second Republic. After the 1936 Popular Front victory, although he had defended voting rights for women (a proposition included in the program of the French Section of the Workers' International party since 1906), left-wing Prime Minister Léon Blum did not implement the measure, because of the fear of the Radical-Socialist Party.

Women obtained the right to vote only after the Provisional Government of the French Republic (GPRF) confirmed, on 5 October 1944, the ordinance of 21 April 1944 of the French Committee of National Liberation. Following the November 1946 elections, the first in which women were permitted to vote, sociologist Robert Verdier refuted any voting gender gap: in May 1947 in Le Populaire, he showed that women do not vote in a consistent way but divide themselves, as men, according to social classes.

=== Other rights for women ===
Olga Petit, born Scheina Lea-Balachowsky and also referred to as Sonia Olga Balachowsky-Petit, became the first female lawyer in France on 6 December 1900.

Marital power (puissance maritale) was abolished in 1938. However, the legal repeal of the specific doctrine of marital power does not necessarily grant married women the same legal rights as their husbands (or as unmarried women) as was notably the case in France, where the legal subordination of the wife (primarily coming from the Napoleonic Code) was gradually abolished with women obtaining full equality in marriage only in the 1980s.

== Second-wave feminism ==
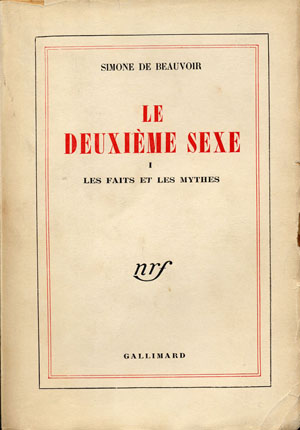
De Beauvoir's treatise Le Deuxième Sexe was the starting point of second-wave feminism.

=== War years ===
The Union des femmes françaises had its origins in France during the Second World War. Women's committees of the French Resistance were born of the grassroots Resistance committees created by Danielle Casanova. These women's committees gradually took shape at local levels, then at the regional and inter-regional level. They were regrouped within the Union des femmes françaises in the zone occupée and the Union des femmes de France in the zone libre. The leaders were Josette Dumeix, then Maria Rabaté for the northern zone, after the arrest of Danielle Casanova and Marcelle Barjonet. and Simone Bertrand in the zone libre.

=== Post-war period ===
Women were not allowed to become judges in France until 1946.

During the baby boom period, feminism became a minor movement, despite forerunners such as Simone de Beauvoir, who published The Second Sex in 1949.

The Second Sex is a detailed analysis of women's oppression and a foundational tract of contemporary feminism. It sets out a feminist existentialism which prescribes a moral revolution. As an existentialist, de Beauvoir accepted Jean-Paul Sartre's precept that existence precedes essence; hence "one is not born a woman, but becomes one". Her analysis focuses on the social construction of Woman as the Other, this de Beauvoir identifies as fundamental to women's oppression. She argues that women have historically been considered deviant and abnormal, and contends that even Mary Wollstonecraft considered men to be the ideal toward which women should aspire. De Beauvoir argues that for feminism to move forward, this attitude must be set aside.

Married French women obtained the right to work without their husband's consent in 1965. The Neuwirth Law legalized birth control in 1967, but the relative executive decrees were blocked for a couple years by the conservative government.

=== May 1968 and its aftermath ===
A strong feminist movement would only emerge in the aftermath of May 1968, with the creation of the Mouvement de libération des femmes (Women's Liberation Movement, MLF), allegedly by Antoinette Fouque, Monique Wittig and Josiane Chanel in 1968. The name itself was given by the press, in reference to the US Women's Lib movement. In the frame of the cultural and social changes that occurred during the Fifth Republic, they advocated the right of autonomy from their husbands, and the rights to contraception and to abortion.

The paternal authority of a man over his family in France was ended in 1970 (before that parental responsibilities belonged solely to the father who made all legal decisions concerning the children).

From 1970, the procedures for the use of the title "Mademoiselle" were challenged in France, particularly by feminist groups who wanted it banned. A circular from François Fillon, then Prime Minister, dated 21 February 2012, called for the deletion of the word "Mademoiselle" in all official documents. On 26 December 2012, the Council of State approved the deletion.

In 1971, the feminist lawyer Gisèle Halimi founded the group Choisir ("To Choose"), to protect the women who had signed "Le Manifeste des 343 Salopes" (in English "Manifesto of the 343 Sluts" or alternately "Manifesto of the 343 Bitches"), written by Simone de Beauvoir. This provocative title became popular after Cabu's drawing on a satirical journal with the caption: « Who got those 343 whores pregnant? »); the women were admitting to have had illegal abortions, and therefore exposing themselves to judicial actions and prison sentences. The Manifesto had been published in Le Nouvel Observateur on 5 April 1971. The Manifesto was the inspiration for a 3 February 1973, manifesto by 331 doctors declaring their support for abortion rights:

We want freedom of abortion. It is entirely the woman's decision. We reject any entity that forces her to defend herself, perpetuates an atmosphere of guilt, and allows underground abortions to persist ....

Choisir had transformed into a clearly reformist body in 1972, and their campaign greatly influenced the passing of the law allowing contraception and abortion carried through by Simone Veil in 1975. The Veil Act was at the time hotly contested by Veil's own party, the conservative Union for French Democracy (UDF).

In 1974, Françoise d'Eaubonne coined the term "ecofeminism."

A new reform in France in 1985 abolished the stipulation that the father had the sole power to administer the children's property.

In 1999, Florence Montreynaud launched the Chiennes de garde NGO.

=== French feminist theory ===
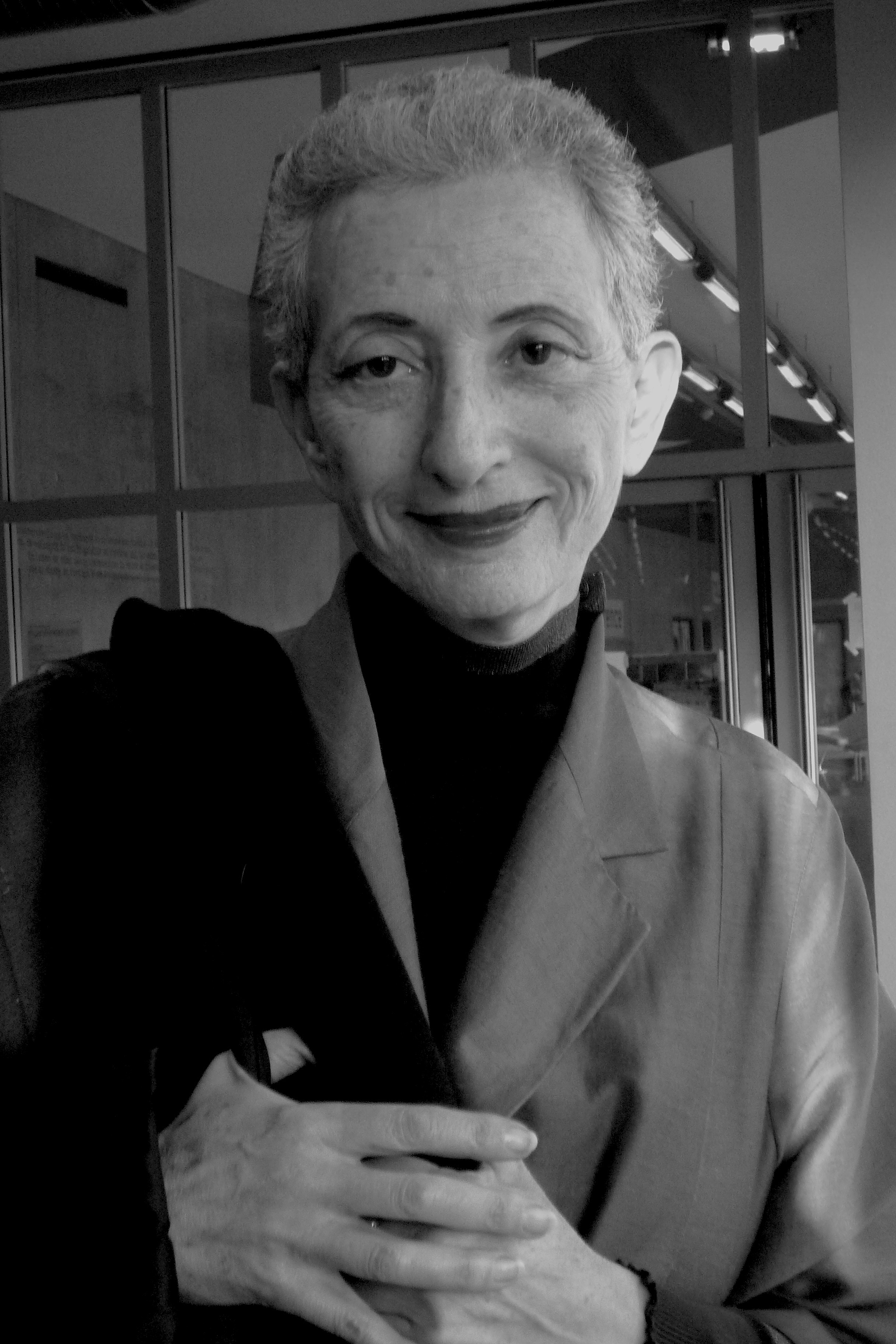
Hélène Cixous, a theoretician of écriture féminine

In the English-speaking world, the term "French feminism" refers to a branch of theories and philosophies by and about women that emerged in the 1970s to the 1990s. These ideas have run parallel to and sometimes in contradistinction to the political feminist movement in France but is often referred to as "French feminist theory," distinguished by an approach which is more philosophical and literary. Its writings tend to be effusive and metaphorical being less concerned with political doctrine and generally focused on theories of "the body". The term includes writers who are not French, but who have worked substantially in France and the French tradition.

In the 1970s, French writers approached feminism with the concept of écriture féminine (which translates as female, or feminine writing). Hélène Cixous argues that writing and philosophy are phallocentric and along with other French feminists such as Luce Irigaray emphasize "writing from the body" as a subversive exercise. The work of psychoanalyst and philosopher Julia Kristeva has influenced feminist theory in general and feminist literary criticism in particular. From the 1980s onwards the work of the artist and psychoanalyst Bracha Ettinger has influenced literary criticism, art history and film theory.

Through their own concept of French feminism, American academics separated and ignored the already marginalized self-identifying feminists, while focusing on the women theorists associated with Psych et po and other academics who did not always identify as feminists themselves. This division ended up placing more importance on the theories of the French feminists than the political agenda and goals that groups such as radical feminists and the MLF had at the time.

== Third-wave feminism ==
In the 2000s, some feminist groups such as Ni putes, ni soumises (Neither Whores, Nor Submissives) denounced an increased influence of Islamic extremism in poor suburbs of large immigrant population, claiming they may be pressured into wearing veils, leaving school, and marrying early. On the other hand, a "third wave" of the feminist movement arose, combining the issues of sexism and racism, protesting the perceived Islamophobic instrumentalization of feminism by the French Right.

After Ni Putes Ni Soumises activists were received by Prime Minister Jean Pierre Raffarin and their message incorporated into the official celebrations of Bastille Day 2003 in Paris, various left-wing authors (Sylvie Tissot, Elsa Dorlin, Étienne Balibar, Houria Bouteldja, etc.) as well as NGOs such as Les Blédardes (led by Bouteldja), criticized the racist stigmatization of immigrant populations, whose cultures are depicted as inherently sexist.

They underline that sexism is not a specificity of immigrant populations, as if French culture itself were devoid of sexism, and that the focus on media-friendly and violent acts (such as the burning of Sohane Benziane) silences the precarization of women. They frame the debate among the French Left concerning the 2004 law on secularity and conspicuous religious symbols in schools, mainly targeted against the hijab, under this light.

They claimed that Ni Putes Ni Soumises overshadowed the work of other feminist NGOs. After the nomination of its leader Fadela Amara to the government by Nicolas Sarkozy, Sylvie Tissot denounced a "state feminism" (an instrumentalization of feminism by state authorities) while Bouteldja qualified the NGO as an Ideological State Apparatus (AIE).

In January 2007, the collective of the Féministes indigènes launched a manifesto in honour of the Mulatress Solitude. Solitude was a maroon heroine who fought with Louis Delgrès against the re-establishment of slavery (abolished during the French Revolution) by Napoleon. The manifesto stated that "Western Feminism did not have the monopoly of resistance against masculine domination" and supported a mild form of separatism, refusing to allow others (males or whites) to speak in their names.

== Difficult access to government office for women ==
A few women held public office in the 1930s, although they kept a low profile. In 1936, the new Prime Minister, Léon Blum, included three women in the Popular Front government: Cécile Brunschvicg, Suzanne Lacore and Irène Joliot-Curie. The inclusion of women in the Popular Front government was unanimously appreciated: even the far-right candidate Xavier Vallat addressed his "congratulations" to Blum for this measure while the conservative newspaper Le Temps wrote, on 1 June 1936, that women could be ministers without previous authorizations from their husbands. Cécile Brunschvicg and Irène Joliot-Curie were both legally "under-age" as women.

Wars (both World War I and World War II) had seen the provisional emancipation of some, individual, women, but post-war periods signalled the return to conservative roles. For instance, Lucie Aubrac, who was active in the French Resistance—a role highlighted by Gaullist myths—returned to private life after the war. Thirty-three women were elected at the Liberation, but none entered the government, and the euphoria of the Liberation was quickly halted.

Women retained a low profile during the Fourth and Fifth Republic. In 1949, Jeanne-Paule Sicard was the first female chief of staff, but was called "Mr. Pleven's (then Minister of Defence) secretary." Marie-France Garaud, who entered Jean Foyer's office at the Ministry of Cooperation and would later become President Georges Pompidou's main counsellor, along with Pierre Juillet, was given the same title. The leftist newspaper Libération, founded in 1973 by Jean-Paul Sartre, would depict Marie-France Garaud as yet another figure of female spin-doctors. However, the new role granted to the President of the Republic in the semi-presidential regime of the Fifth Republic after the 1962 referendum on the election of the President at direct universal suffrage, led to a greater role of the "First Lady of France". Although Charles de Gaulle's wife Yvonne remained out of the public sphere, the image of Claude Pompidou would interest the media more and more. The media frenzy surrounding Cécilia Sarkozy, former wife of the former President Nicolas Sarkozy, would mark the culmination of this current.

=== 1945–1974 ===
Of the 27 cabinets formed during the Fourth Republic, only four included women, and never more than one at a time. SFIO member Andrée Viénot, widow of a Resistant, was nominated in June 1946 by the Christian democrat Georges Bidault of the Popular Republican Movement as undersecretary of Youth and Sports. However, she remained in office for only seven months. The next woman to hold government office, Germaine Poinso-Chapuis, was health and education minister from 24 November 1947 to 19 July 1948 in Robert Schuman's cabinet. Remaining one year in office, her name remained attached to a decree financing private education. Published in the Journal officiel on 22 May 1948 with her signature, the decree had been drafted in her absence at the Council of Ministers of France. The Communist and the Radical-Socialist Party called for the repealing of the decree, and finally, Schuman's cabinet was overturned after failing a confidence motion on the subject. Germaine Poinso-Chapuis did not pursue her political career, encouraged to abandon it by Pope Pius XII.

The third woman to hold government office would be the Radical-Socialist Jacqueline Thome-Patenôtre, appointed undersecretary of Reconstruction and Lodging in Maurice Bourgès-Maunoury's cabinet in 1957. Nafissa Sid Cara then participated in the government as undersecretary in charge of Algeria from 1959 till the end of the war in 1962. Marie-Madeleine Dienesch, who evolved from Christian-Democracy to Gaullism (in 1966), occupied various offices as undersecretary between 1968 and 1974. Finally, Suzanne Ploux was undersecretary for the Minister of National Education in 1973 and 1974. In total, only seven women acceded to governmental offices between 1946 and 1974, and only one as minister. Historians explain this rarity by underlining the specific context of the Trente Glorieuses (Thirty Glorious Years) and of the baby boom, leading to a strengthening of familialism and patriarchy.

Even left-wing cabinets abstained from nominating women: Pierre Mendès-France (advised by Colette Baudry) did not include any woman in his cabinet, neither did Guy Mollet, the secretary general of the SFIO, nor the centrist Antoine Pinay. Although the École nationale d'administration (ENA) elite administrative school (from which a lot of French politicians graduate) became gender-mixed in 1945, only 18 women graduated from it between 1946 and 1956 (compared to 706 men).

Of the first eleven cabinets of the Fifth Republic, four did not count any women. In May 1968, the cabinet was exclusively male. This low representation of women was not, however, specific to France: West Germany's government did not include any women in any office from 1949 to 1961, and in 1974–1975, only 12 countries in the world had female ministers. The British government had exclusively male ministers.

=== 1974–1981 ===
In 1974, Valéry Giscard d'Estaing was elected President, and nominated 9 women in his government between 1974 and 1981: Simone Veil, the first female minister, Françoise Giroud, named Minister of the Feminine Condition, Hélène Dorlhac, Alice Saunier-Seité, Annie Lesur and Christiane Scrivener, Nicole Pasquier, Monique Pelletier and Hélène Missoffe. At the end of the 1970s, France was one of the leading countries in the world with respect to the number of female ministers, just behind Sweden. However, they remained highly under-represented in the National Assembly. There were only 14 female deputies (1.8%) in 1973 and 22 (2.8%) in 1978. Janine Alexandre-Derbay, 67-year-old senator of the Republican Party (PR), initiated a hunger strike to protest against the complete absence of women on the governmental majority's electoral lists in Paris.

This new, relative feminisation of power was partly explained by Giscard's government's fears of being confronted with another May 1968 and the influence of the MLF: "We can therefore explain the birth of state feminism under the pressure of contest feminism [féminisme de contestation]", wrote Christine Bard. Although the far-left remained indifferent to the feminisation of power, in 1974, Arlette Laguiller became the first woman to present herself at a presidential election (for the Trotskyist party Workers' Struggle, LO), and integrated feminist propositions in her party. Giscard's achievements concerning the inclusion of women in government has been qualified by Françoise Giroud as his most important feat, while others, such as Evelyne Surrot, Benoîte Groult or the minister Monique Pelletier, denounced electoral "alibis". The sociologist Mariette Sineau underlined that Giscard included women only in the low-levels of the governmental hierarchy (state secretaries) and kept them in socio-educative affairs. Seven women in eighteen (from 1936 to 1981) had offices related to youth and education, and four (including two ministers) had offices related to health, reflecting a traditional gender division. The important Ministry of Finances, Defence, Foreign Affairs and Interior remained out of reach for women. Only six women in eighteen had been elected through universal suffrage. The rest were nominated by the Prime Minister. Hélène Missoffe was the only deputy to be named by Giscard.

=== From the 1980s to today ===
After the election of the socialist candidate François Mitterrand in 1981, a law sponsored by Yvette Roudy, called the "Roudy Law", was passed. This law had in it a ban on refusing promotion, training, or employment based on sex, and put the burden of proof on the employer (rather than the employee as it had previously been) regarding any conflict between the employee and their employer. The law also required employers to make a written report of "the measures taken during the past year to ensure gender equality in the workplace, the objectives planned for the coming year, and the definition of… the actions to be taken in this regard."

Left and right-wing female ministers signed the Manifeste des 10 in 1996 for equal representation of women in politics. It was opposed by feminist historian and psychoanalyst Elisabeth Roudinesco, who believed the existing legislation was sufficient.

Socialist Ségolène Royal was the first female presidential candidate to pass the first round of the French presidential election in 2007, confronting the conservative UMP candidate Nicolas Sarkozy. Sarkozy won in a tight contest, but one year later, polls showed voters regretted not sending Royal to the Élysée Palace and that she would win a 2008 match up with Sarkozy easily. She was a front-runner in their leadership election, which took place 20 November 2008 but was narrowly defeated in the second round by rival Martine Aubry, also a woman.

Joan Scott, a professor at the Institute for Advanced Study, stated: "There is a longstanding commitment to the notion that the French do gender relations differently – especially from prudish Americans – and that has to do with the French understanding of seduction. Seduction is the alternative to thinking about [sexual harassment] as sexual harassment." Christine Bard, a professor at the University of Angers, echoed those thoughts, saying that there is an "idealization of seduction à la Française, and that anti-feminism has become almost part of the national identity" in France.

The Court of Cassation authorized prosecution of spouses for rape or sexual assault in 1990. In 1992, the Court of Cassation convicted a man of the rape of his wife, stating that the presumption that spouses have consented to sexual acts that occur within marriage is only valid when the contrary is not proven. In 1994, Law 94-89 criminalised marital rape; a second law, passed 4 April 2006, makes rape by a partner an aggravating circumstance in prosecuting rape. In 2025, the European Court of Human Rights ruled in H.W. v. France that under French law and the European Convention on Human Rights, "marital duties" do not and cannot include an obligation to have sex with one's spouse without one's consent (which is not presumed to exist within marriage), overruling earlier case law from lower courts in France.

Sexual harassment in the workplace was made subject to legal sanction in France starting only in 1992. The reach of those laws was not matched by vigorous enforcement, labor lawyers say. France's "reluctance to move more aggressively against sexual harassment reflects deeply rooted ideas about sexual relations and the relative power between men and women", said Scott.

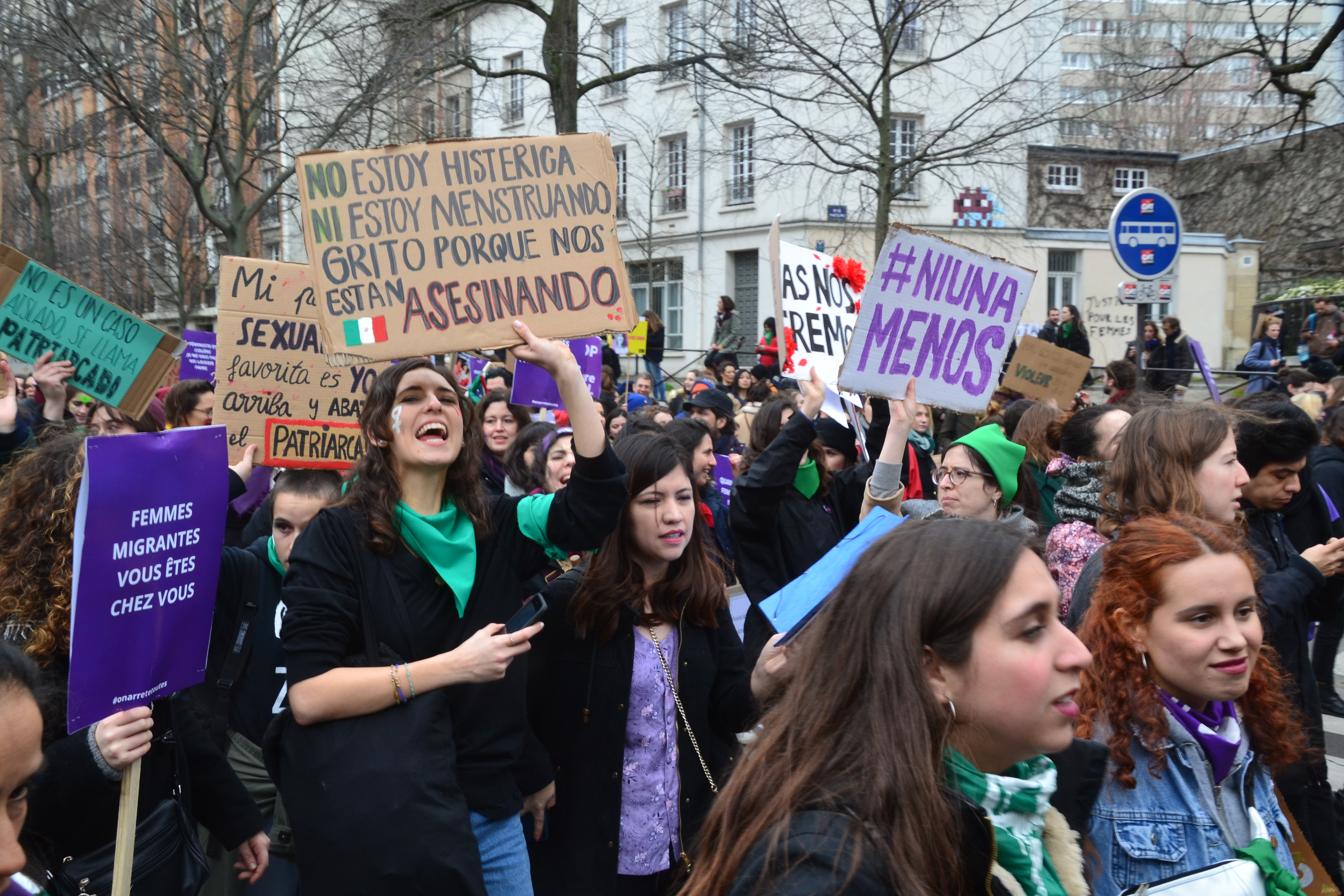
International Women's Day march in Paris, 8 March 2020

France outlawed street sexual harassment in 2018, passing a law declaring catcalling on streets and public transportation is subject to fines of up to €750, with more for more aggressive and physical behavior. The law also declared that sex between an adult and a person of 15 or under can be considered rape if the younger person is judged incompetent to give consent. It also gives underage victims of rape an extra decade to file complaints, extending the deadline to 30 years from their turning 18.

== See also ==
- Abortion in France
- Écriture féminine
- Femmes solidaires
- French structuralist feminism
- History of the Left in France
- LGBT rights in France
- Protests of 1968
- State feminism
- Marie-Laure Sauty de Chalon
- Women in the French National Assembly
- Gender Inequalities in France

== Works cited ==
- Girault, Jacques; Loiseau, Dominique (2023). "BERTRAND Simone, Séraphine". maitron.fr..
- Guéraiche, William (1999). Les femmes et la République: essai sur la répartition du pouvoir de 1943 à 1979 (in French). Editions de l'Atelier. ISBN 978-2-7082-3468-0.
- Loiseau, Dominique; Pennetier, Claude (2023). "BARJONET Marcelle, épouse HURAUX". maitron.fr (in French).
- Sapiro, Gisèle (2004). "Brassard de l'Union des femmes françaises – Île-de-France". museedelaresistanceenligne.org.
