= Women in the French Revolution =

In Liberty Leading the People by Eugène Delacroix, Lady Liberty leads the people of the French Revolution of 1830

Historians since the late 20th century have debated how women shared in the French Revolution and what impact it had on French women. Women had no political rights in pre-Revolutionary France; they were considered "passive" citizens, forced to rely on men to determine what was best for them. That changed dramatically in theory as there seemingly were great advances in feminism. Feminism emerged in Paris as part of a broad demand for social and political reform. These women demanded equality for women and then moved on to a demand for the end of male domination. Their chief vehicle for agitation were pamphlets and women's clubs. The Jacobin element in power abolished all the women's clubs in October 1793 and arrested their leaders. The movement was crushed. Devance explains the decision in terms of the emphasis on masculinity in wartime, Marie Antoinette's bad reputation for feminine interference in state affairs, and traditional male supremacy. A decade later the Napoleonic Code confirmed and perpetuated women's second-class status.

The French Revolution also sparked the modern feminist movement as women's rights resonated globally. It inspired movements like New Zealand's suffrage bill and helped shape the foundation of modern feminism, challenging traditional gender roles and advocating for universal equality.

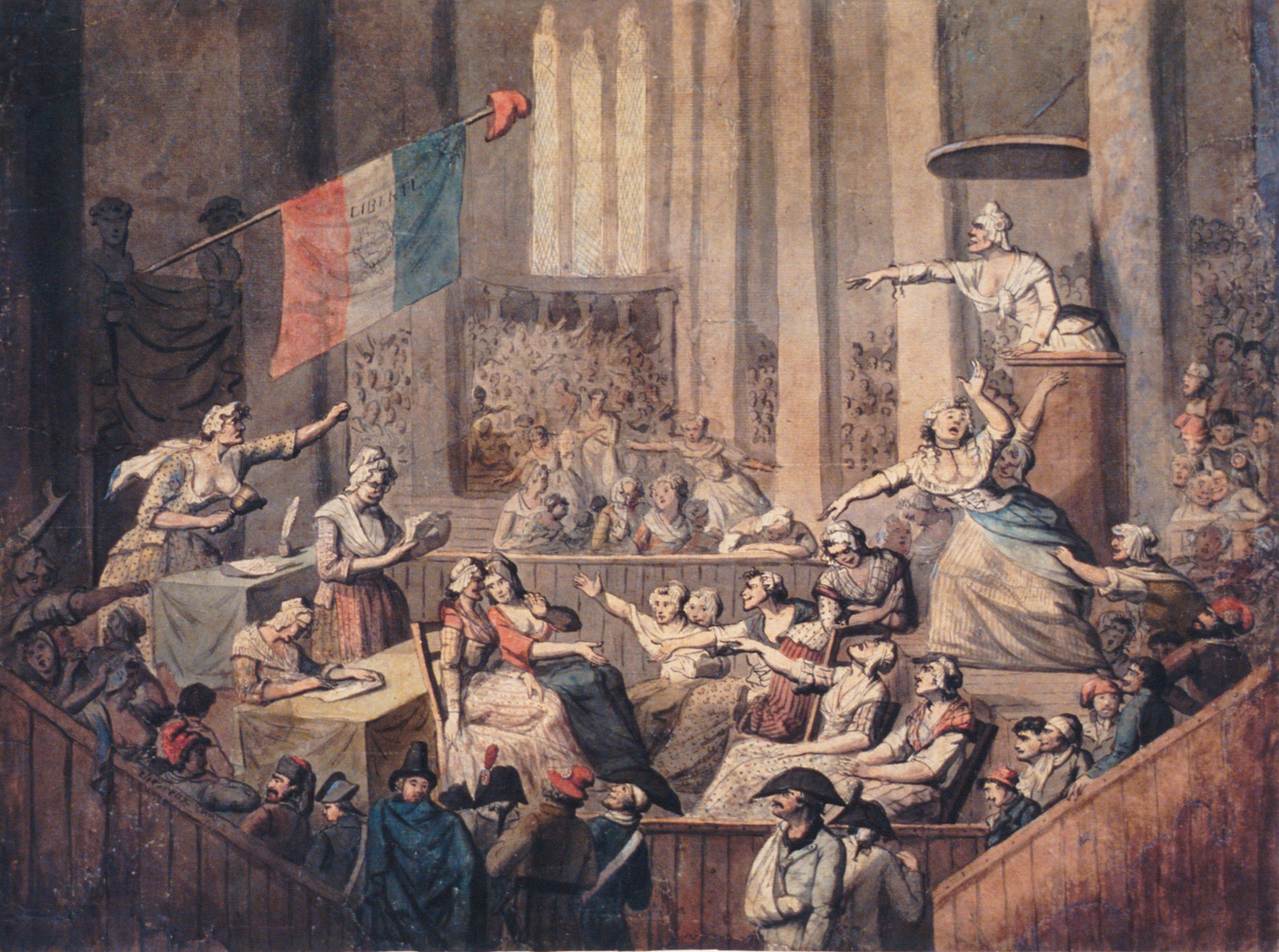
Club of patriotic women in a church

== Traditional roles of Pre-Revolutionary Women ==
Women in pre-Revolutionary France could not vote or hold any political office. They were considered "passive" citizens, forced to rely on men to determine what was best for them in the government. It was the men who defined these categories, and women were forced to accept male domination in the political sphere.

Single and married women had the same lack of rights. They did have rights in civil and criminal courts, which allowed their testimonies to be heard. In some instances, women were allowed to be part of contractual relationships however, they were not allowed to be part of notarized acts such as wills. For most women, all of their rights were under their father's authority until marriage, then the authority would be passed down to the husband. Married women had no rights over themselves nor any property. Only in the instance of her husband's death women would be allowed ownership over property. Laws and traditions confined women to work strenuous, labor-intensive jobs, which gave earnings that were significantly lower than men's income, and did not allow rights to improve their status or become masters at their trade. Women had some political rights, including women in religious orders, noblewomen and some women of the Third Estate including widows. Their involvement in political matters pertained to being allowed to send representatives to participate in primary assemblies.

Women were taught to be committed to their husbands and "all his interests...[ Whatever it may be like cooking food, doing chores.]attention and care... [and] sincere and discreet zeal for his salvation." A woman's education often consisted of learning to be a good wife and mother; thus, women were not supposed to be involved in the political sphere, as the limit of their influence was the raising of future citizens. The subservient role of women before the revolution was perhaps best exemplified by the Frederician Code, published in 1761 and attacked by Enlightenment philosophers and publications.

The highly influential Encyclopédie in the 1750s set the tone of the Enlightenment, and its ideas exerted influence on the subsequent Revolution in France. Writing several articles on women in society, Louis de Jaucourt criticized traditional roles for women, arguing that "it would be difficult to demonstrate that the husband's rule comes from nature, in as much as this principle is contrary to natural human equality... a man does not invariably have more strength of body, of wisdom, of mind or conduct than a woman... The example of England and Russia shows clearly that women can succeed equally in both moderate and despotic government..." One of the greatest influences foreshadowing the revolutionary and republican transformations in women's roles was Jean-Jacques Rousseau's educational treatise Emile (1762). Some liberal men advocated equal rights for women, including women's suffrage. Nicolas de Condorcet was especially noted for his advocacy, in his articles published in the Journal de la Société de 1789, and by publishing De l'admission des femmes au droit de cité ("For the Admission to the Rights of Citizenship For Women") in 1790.

== Revolutionary Roles of the French Women ==
When the Revolution started, some women struck forcefully, using the volatile political climate to assert their active natures. In the time of the Revolution, women could not be kept out of the political sphere. They swore oaths of loyalty, "solemn declarations of patriotic allegiance, [and] affirmations of the political responsibilities of citizenship." De Corday d'Armont is a prime example of such a woman: sympathetic to the revolutionary political faction of the Girondists, she assassinated the Jacobin leader, Jean-Paul Marat. Throughout the Revolution, other women such as Pauline Léon and her Society of Revolutionary Republican Women supported the radical Jacobins, staged demonstrations in the National Assembly and participated in the riots, often using armed force.

=== Feminist agitation ===
The Women's March on Versailles is but one example of feminist militant activism during the French Revolution. While largely left out of the thrust for increasing rights of citizens, as the question was left indeterminate in the 1789 Declaration of the Rights of Man and the Citizen, activists such as Pauline Léon and Théroigne de Méricourt agitated for full citizenship for women. Women were, nonetheless, "denied political rights of 'active citizenship' (1791) and democratic citizenship (1793)".

Pauline Léon, on 6 March 1792, submitted a petition signed by 319 women to the National Assembly requesting permission to form a garde national to defend Paris in case of military invasion. Léon requested permission be granted to women to arm themselves with pikes, pistols, sabers and rifles, as well as the privilege of drilling under the French Guards. Her request was denied. Later in 1792, Théroigne de Méricourt made a call for the creation of "legions of amazons" to protect the revolution. As part of her call, she claimed that the right to bear arms would transform women into citizens.

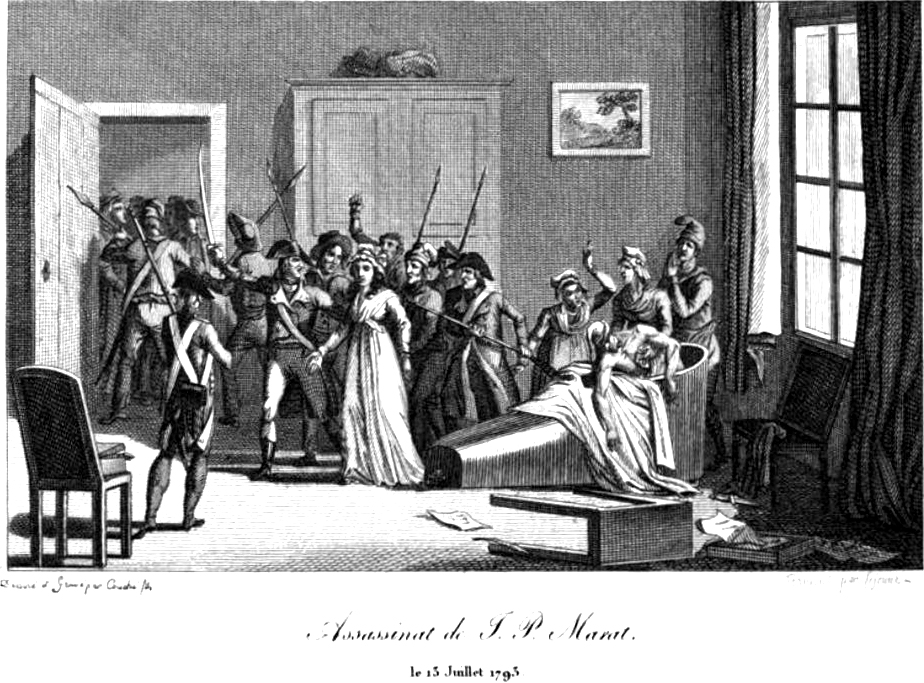
Assassination of Marat

On 20 June 1792, many armed women took part in a procession that "passed through the halls of the Legislative Assembly, into the Tuileries Gardens, and then through the King's residence." Militant women also assumed a special role in the funeral of Marat, following his murder on 13 July 1793. As part of the funeral procession, they carried the bathtub in which Marat had been murdered as well as a shirt stained with Marat's blood.

The most radical militant feminist activism was practiced by the Society of Revolutionary Republican Women, which was founded by Léon and her colleague, Claire Lacombe on 10 May 1793. The club's goal was "to deliberate on the means of frustrating the projects of the enemies of the Republic." Up to 180 women attended the meetings of the Society. Of special interest to the Society was "combating hoarding [of grain and other staples] and inflation." On 20 May 1793, women were at the fore of a crowd that demanded "bread and the Constitution of 1793." When their cries went unnoticed, the women went on a rampage, "sacking shops, seizing grain and kidnapping officials."

The Society demanded a law in 1793 that would compel all women to wear the tricolore cockade insignia to demonstrate their loyalty to the Republic. They also repeated their demands for vigorous price controls to keep bread – the major food of the poor people – from becoming too expensive. After the Convention passed the cockade law in September 1793, the Revolutionary Republican Women demanded vigorous enforcement. Still, they were countered by market women, former servants, and religious women who adamantly opposed price controls (which would drive them out of business) and resented attacks on the aristocracy and religion. They said that "Only whores and female Jacobins wear cockades." Fistfights broke out in the streets between the two factions of women.

Meanwhile, the men who controlled the Jacobins rejected the Revolutionary Republican Women as dangerous rabble-rousers. At this point, the Jacobins controlled the government; they dissolved the Society of Revolutionary Republican Women and decreed that all women's clubs and associations were illegal. They sternly reminded women to stay home and tend to their families by leaving public affairs to the men. Organized women were permanently shut out of the French Revolution after October 30, 1793. Women's breasts were seen as a natural sign that women were to be barred from citizenship and the wielding of political power; women were to be relegated to the domestic sphere and motherhood.

Most of these outwardly activist women were punished for their militancy. The kind of punishment received during the Revolution included public denouncement, arrest, execution, or exile. Théroigne de Méricourt was arrested, publicly flogged and then spent the rest of her life sentenced to an insane asylum. Pauline Léon and Claire Lacombe were arrested, later released, and continued to receive ridicule and abuse for their activism. Many of the Revolution women were even publicly executed for "conspiring against the unity and the indivisibility of the Republic".

=== Women writers ===
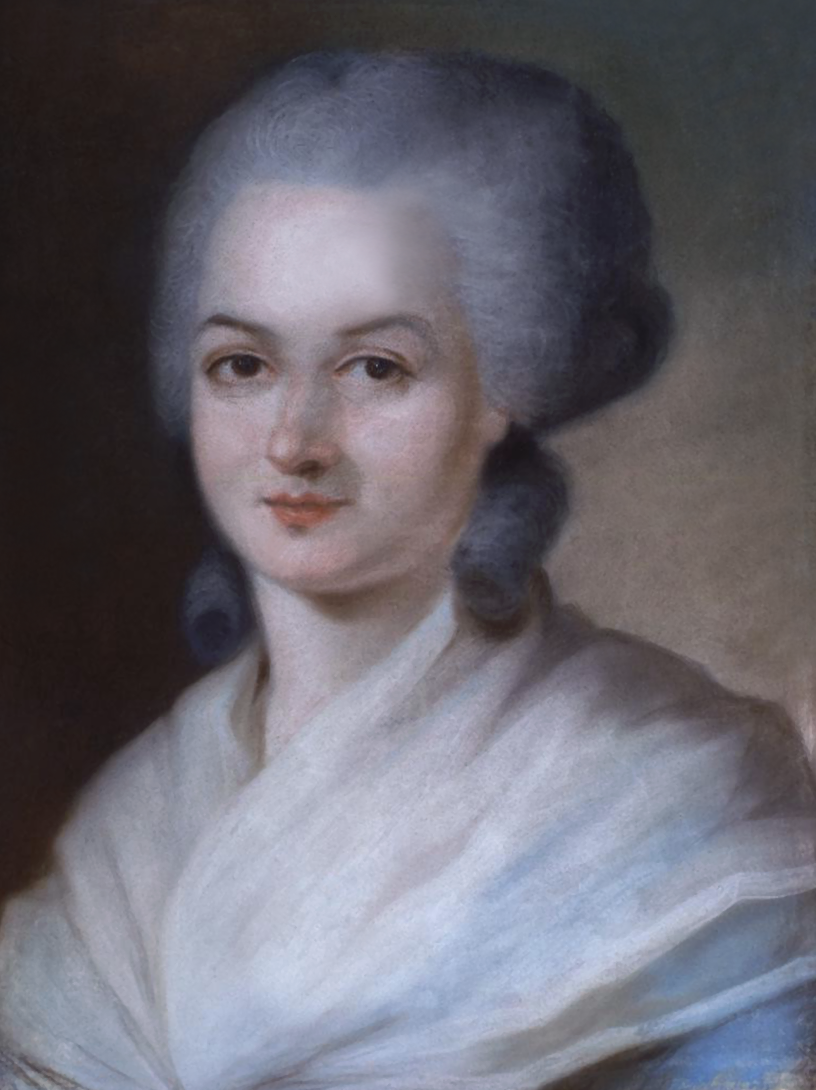
Olympe de Gouges wrote the Declaration of the Rights of Woman and the Female Citizen in 1791.

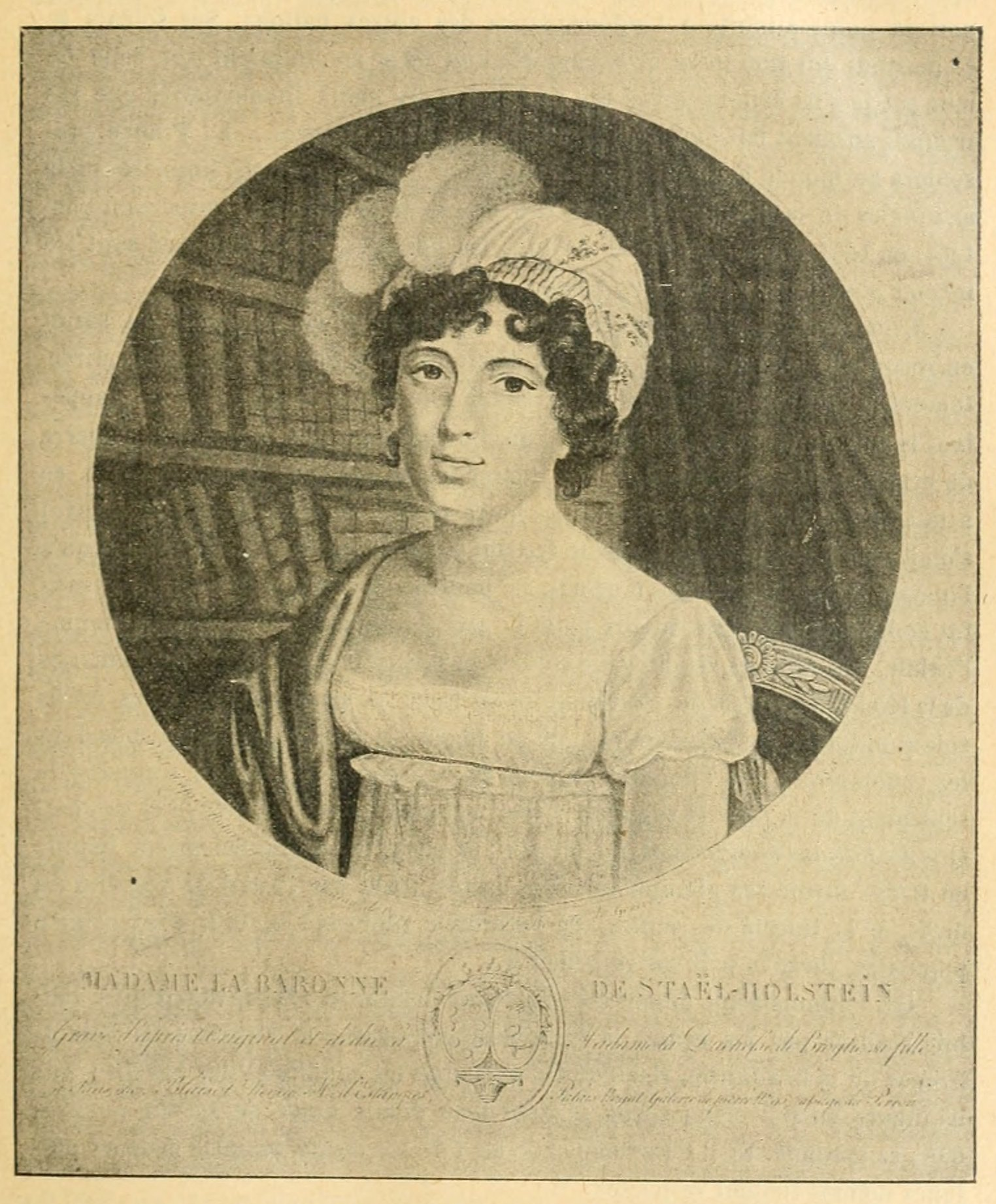
Madame de Staël, one of the most sophisticated activists and commentators on the Revolution

While some women chose a militant and often violent path, others chose to influence events through writing, publications, and meetings. Olympe de Gouges wrote several plays, short stories, and novels. Her publications emphasized that women and men are different, but this shouldn't stop them from equality under the law. In her 1791 Declaration of the Rights of Woman and of the Female Citizen she insisted that women deserved rights, especially in areas concerning them directly, such as divorce and recognition of illegitimate children.

De Gouges also expressed non-gender political views; even before the start of the terror, Olympe de Gouges addressed Robespierre using the pseudonym "Polyme" calling him the Revolution's "infamy and shame." She warned of the Revolution's building extremism, saying that leaders were "preparing new shackles if [the French people's liberty were to] waver." Stating that she was willing to sacrifice herself by jumping into the Seine if Robespierre were to join her, de Gouges desperately attempted to grab the attention of the French citizenry and alert them to the dangers that Robespierre embodied. Olympe de Gouges was one of few public voices to protest the human slave trade and the only woman to openly criticize the government's suspending of the democratic constitution of 1793. In addition to these bold writings, her defense of the king was one of the factors leading to her execution. An influential figure, one of her suggestions early in the Revolution, to have a voluntary, patriotic tax, was adopted by the National Convention in 1789.

Madame Roland (aka Manon or Marie Roland) was another important female activist. Her political focus was not specifically on women or their liberation. She focused on other aspects of the government but was a feminist because she was a woman working to influence the world. Her letters to leaders of the Revolution influenced policy; in addition, she often hosted political gatherings of the Brissotins, a political group that allowed women to join.

While limited by her gender, Madame Roland took it upon herself to spread Revolutionary ideology and spread the word of events, as well as to assist in formulating the policies of her political allies. Unable to directly write policies or carry them through to the government, Roland influenced her political allies and promoted her political agenda. Roland attributed women's lack of education to the public view that women were too weak or vain to be involved in the serious business of politics. She believed that it was this inferior education that turned them into foolish people, but women "could easily be concentrated and solidified upon objects of great significance" if given a chance.

As she was led to the scaffold, Madame Roland shouted, "O liberty! What crimes are committed in thy name!" Witnesses of her life and death, editors, and readers helped to finish her writings, and several editions were published posthumously. While she did not focus on gender politics in her writings, by taking an active role in the tumultuous time of the Revolution, Roland took a stand for women of the time and proved they could take an intelligent, active role in politics.

Though women did not gain the right to vote due to the Revolution, they still greatly expanded their political participation and involvement in government. They set precedents for generations of feminists to come. A leading example of lasting feminine influence from that time was Madame de Staël (1766–1817) who both witnessed the tumultuous events, participated in, and commented on them.

== Male Support for Women Rights ==
During the French Revolution, male support played a significant role in advocating for revolutionary ideals and reforms. Many men, including intellectuals, politicians, and activists, were actively involved in various aspects of the revolutionary movement, contributing to its ideological foundations and practical implementations.

One notable example of male support for the French Revolution was the Marquis de Condorcet, a prominent Enlightenment philosopher and mathematician. Condorcet advocated for principles of equality, liberty, and fraternity, which were central to the revolutionary ethos. He played a crucial role in drafting documents such as the Declaration of the Rights of Man and of the Citizen, which outlined the fundamental rights and freedoms of individuals.

Additionally, Condorcet was a vocal proponent of women's rights during the Revolution. He collaborated closely with his wife, Sophie de Condorcet, in advocating for gender equality and women's inclusion in civil and political life. Their joint efforts, including Sophie's active participation in political discussions and writing, helped to advance the cause of women's rights during this period.

== Counter-revolutionary women ==
A major aspect of the French Revolution was the dechristianisation movement, which many common people disagreed with. Especially for women living in rural areas of France, the demise of the Catholic Church meant a loss of normalcy. For instance, the ringing of Church bells resonating through the town called people to confession and symbolised unity for the community. With the onset of the dechristianisation campaign, the Republic silenced these bells and sought simultaneously to silence the religious fervor of the majority Catholic population.

When these revolutionary changes to the Church were implemented, it spawned a counter-revolutionary movement, particularly amongst women. Although some of these women embraced the political and social amendments of the Revolution, they opposed the dissolution of the Catholic Church and the formation of revolutionary cults like the Cult of the Supreme Being advocated by Robespierre. As Olwen Hufton argues, these women began to see themselves as the "defenders of the faith". They took it upon themselves to protect the Church from what they saw as a heretical change to their faith, enforced by revolutionaries.

Counter-revolutionary women resisted what they saw as the intrusion of the state into their lives. Economically, many peasant women refused to sell their goods for assignats because this form of currency was unstable and was backed by the sale of confiscated Church property. By far the most important issue to counter-revolutionary women was the passage and the enforcement of the Civil Constitution of the Clergy in 1790. In response to this measure, women in many areas began circulating anti-oath pamphlets and refused to attend masses held by priests who had sworn oaths of loyalty to the Republic. This diminished the social and political influence of the juring priests because they presided over smaller congregations, and counter-revolutionary women did not seek them for baptisms, marriages, or confession. Instead, they secretly hid nonjuring priests and attended clandestine traditional masses. These women continued to adhere to traditional practices such as Christian burials and naming their children after saints despite revolutionary decrees to the contrary.

It was this determined resistance to the Civil Constitution of the Clergy and the dechristianisation campaigns that played a major role in the re-emergence of the Catholic Church as a prominent social institution. Olwen Hufton notes about the Counter-Revolutionary women: "for it is her commitment to her religion which determines in the post-Thermidorean period the re-emergence of the Catholic Church...". Although they struggled, these women were eventually vindicated in their bid to re-establish the Church and thereby also to reestablish traditional family life and social stability. This was seen in the Concordat of 1801, which formally reinstated the Catholic Church in France. This act came after years of attempts at dechristianisation or state-controlled religion, which were thwarted in part due to the resistance of religiously devout counter-revolutionary women.

== See also ==
- Cécile Renault, who tried to murder Robespierre
- Charlotte Corday, who murdered Marat
- Congregation of the Sisters of the Blessed Sacrament
- Daughters of Charity of Saint Vincent de Paul
- French Revolution
- Germaine de Staël, political theorist, writer, politician, exile
- Élisabeth Vigée Le Brun, painter
- Madelonnettes Convent
- Marie-Anne Pierrette Paulze
- Marquis de Condorcet, feminist
- Militant Feminism in the French Revolution
- Society of Revolutionary Republican Women
- Soleilmont Abbey
- Theroigne de Mericourt
- Women's Petition to the National Assembly
