= Red Rosa =

Red Rosa may refer to:

- Claire Lacombe (b. 1765), French actress
- Rosa Luxemburg (1871–1919), Polish Marxist theorist, socialist philosopher, and revolutionary
