= Fédéré =

French troops who volunteered for the French National Guard during the French Revolution

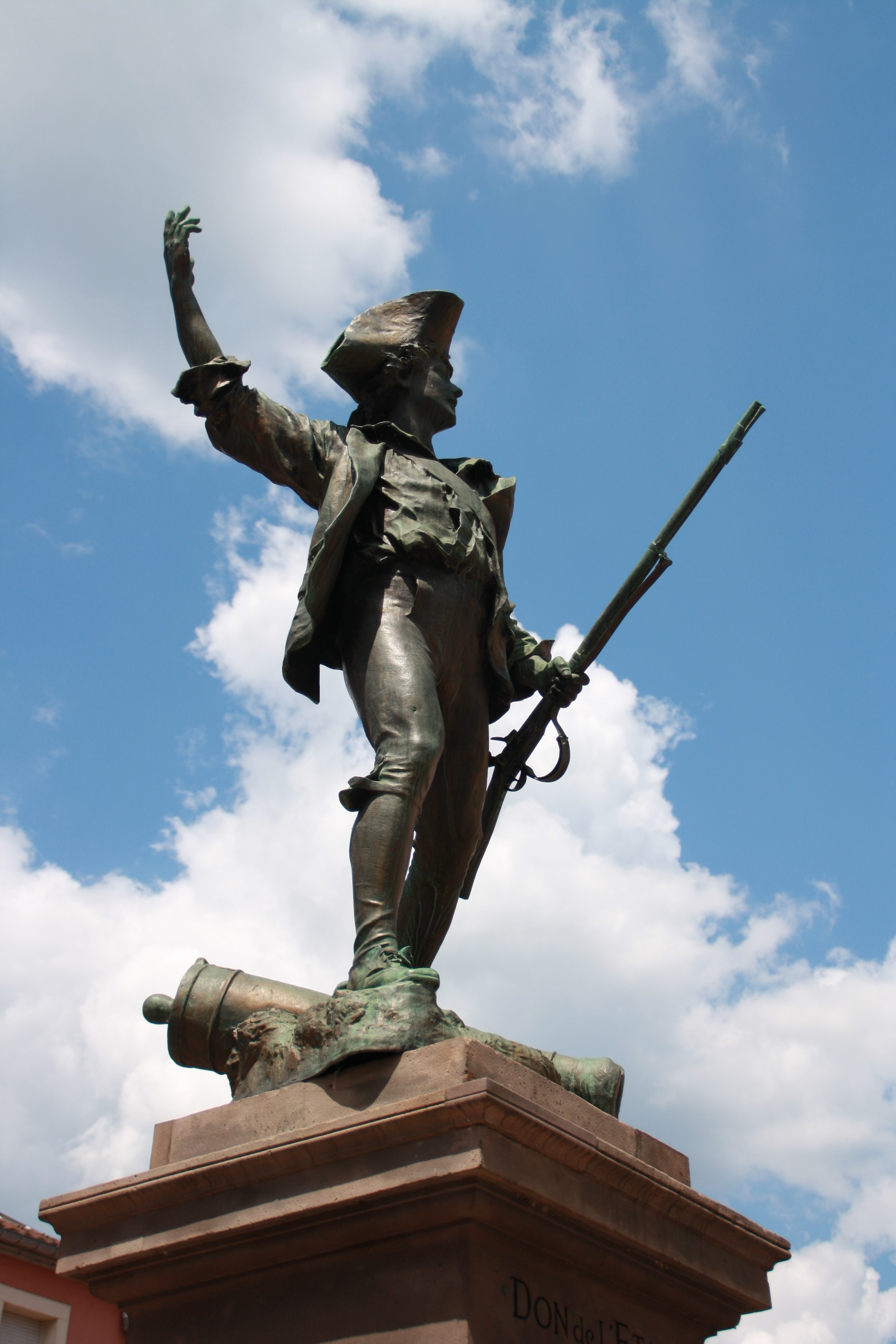
The Volunteer of 1792, public statue in Remiremont

The term "fédérés" (French pronunciation: [fedeʁe]; sometimes translated to English as "federates") most commonly refers to the troops who volunteered for the French National Guard in the summer of 1792 during the French Revolution. The fédérés of 1792 effected a transformation of the Guard from a constitutional monarchist force into a republican revolutionary force.

"Fédérés" has several other closely related meanings, also discussed in this article.

== Origin and terminology ==
The term "fédérés" derives from the Fête de la Fédération, the annual celebration during the revolutionary era, celebrated at the Champ de Mars in Paris on the anniversary of the storming of the Bastille on 14 July 1789. However, the term "fédérés" as used by historians today almost always refers to the volunteer troops of 1792. The third fête of 1792 was of a far more radical nature than that of 1790, and prefigured the militant insurrections later in the year.

== 1790 celebration ==
At the first fête de la Fédération in 1790, Talleyrand said Mass, Lafayette addressed the crowd, and King Louis XVI gave a secular sermon. The attendees, known as fédérés, came from all over France and brought the spirit of the revolution back to the provinces.

== Provincial militia in Paris – 1792 ==
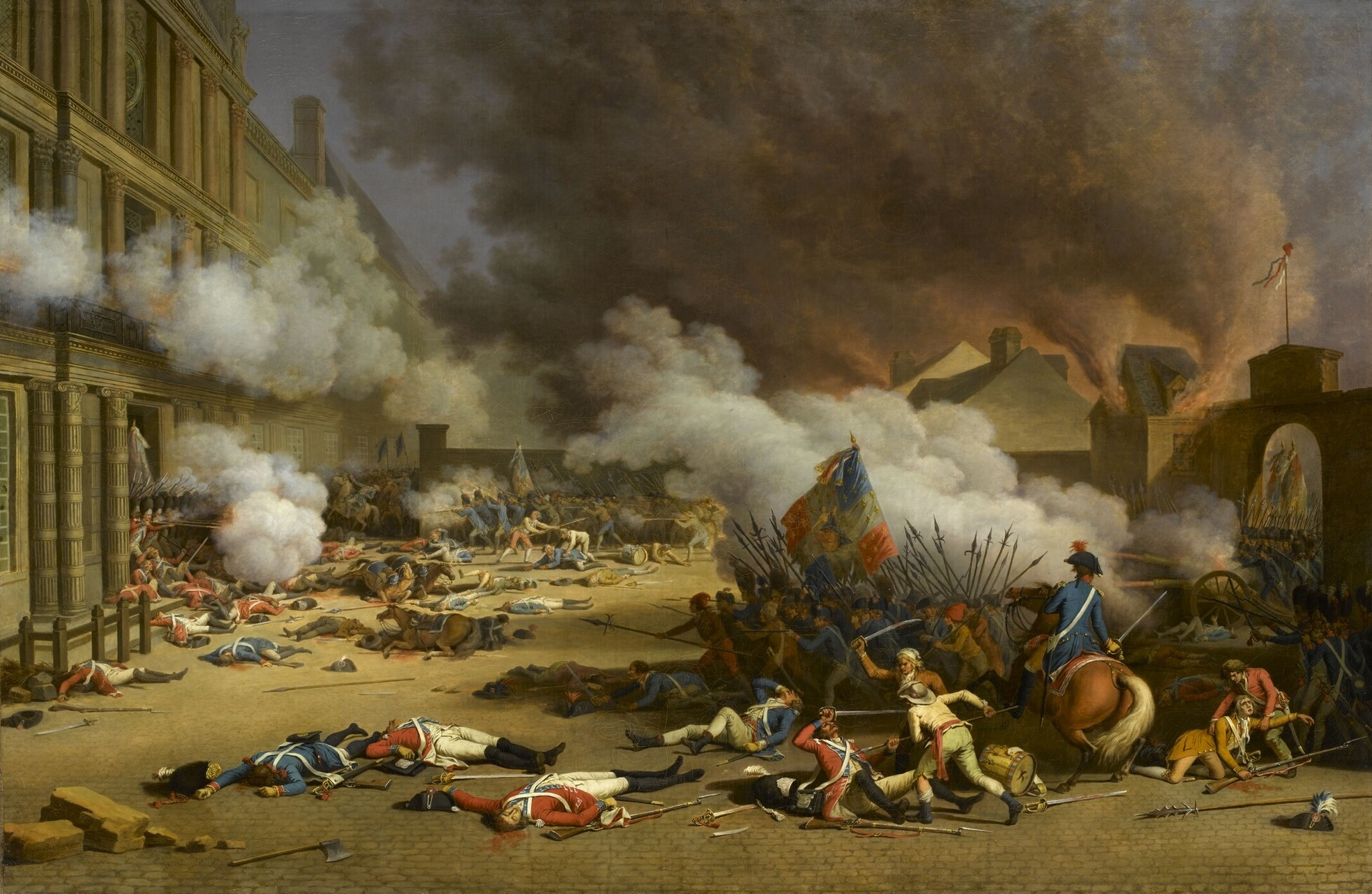
Capture of the Tuileries Palace, 10 August 1792, by Jean Duplessis-Bertaux

In early May, 1792, the Girondin Minister of War Joseph Servan made the proposal to bring armed volunteers from the provinces to Paris. The citizen-soldiers were to be invited to the city for the third fête, but they were also intended to become an effective supplement to the regular army. They were to receive military training in Paris and eventually take their place at the frontlines in the French Revolutionary War.

The prospect of thousands of new militiamen descending upon the capital for an indeterminate length of time was a highly contentious one. Some, like the king, saw it as a plot to stack Paris full with anti-monarchists, while others, like Maximilien Robespierre, feared the outsiders might be used as a provincial counterweight to the radical Parisian sans-culottes.

King Louis employed his constitutional prerogative to quash the proposal, and this use of the greatly unpopular royal veto was met with a storm of protest from all quarters. In the ensuing political struggle, the king dismissed the entire Girondin ministry. With the government in disarray, radical agitators seized the issue and it rapidly became the source of massive citywide unrest.

Eventually thousands of the provincial volunteers arrived regardless of the king's disapproval, and they were given a warm welcome by members of the Legislative Assembly. Robespierre himself, now fully supportive, greeted the provincial "defenders of liberty" as the "last hope of the country". (Meanwhile, 20,000 Fédérés entered the city for the celebration of 14 July; Pétion was reinstalled.) At the end of July more than 3,000 Fédérés had entered Paris useful in provoking various measures, notably the overthrow of the king. They were allowed to join the National Guard, and would focus on the "enemy within". A significant maneuver took place during the night when volunteers from Marseille led by Charles Barbaroux moved into the Cordeliers Convent. On 7 August, Pétion proposed that Robespierre assist in facilitating the departure of Fédérés to pacify the capital, suggesting their more effective service at the front lines.

The fédérés issue helped lead to a series of Parisian insurrections throughout the spring and summer, culminating in the assault on the Tuileries Palace on 10 August. The fédérés themselves played a large part in the Tuileries assault, and afterwards they contributed further to the climate of republican solidarity by adopting an uncommonly grateful public posture towards the female participants of the Revolution. In a post-victory ceremony, leaders of the fédérés honored their female colleagues and awarded civic crowns to three who displayed outstanding conduct in the assault – Louise Reine Audu, Claire Lacombe, and Théroigne de Méricourt.

== Other meanings ==
=== Antiquity ===
- Fœderati, any one of several outlying nations providing military assistance to ancient Rome in exchange for payment, often in the form of grants of land, serving as monoëthnic units under native leaders (as opposed to traditional polyethnic "auxiliaries" commanded by Roman officers).

=== 1815 ===
- The term "Fédérations" was revived during the Cent-Jours. It was an anti-royalist movement intended to repress local revival of monarchists after the flight of the Bourbons.

=== 1871 ===
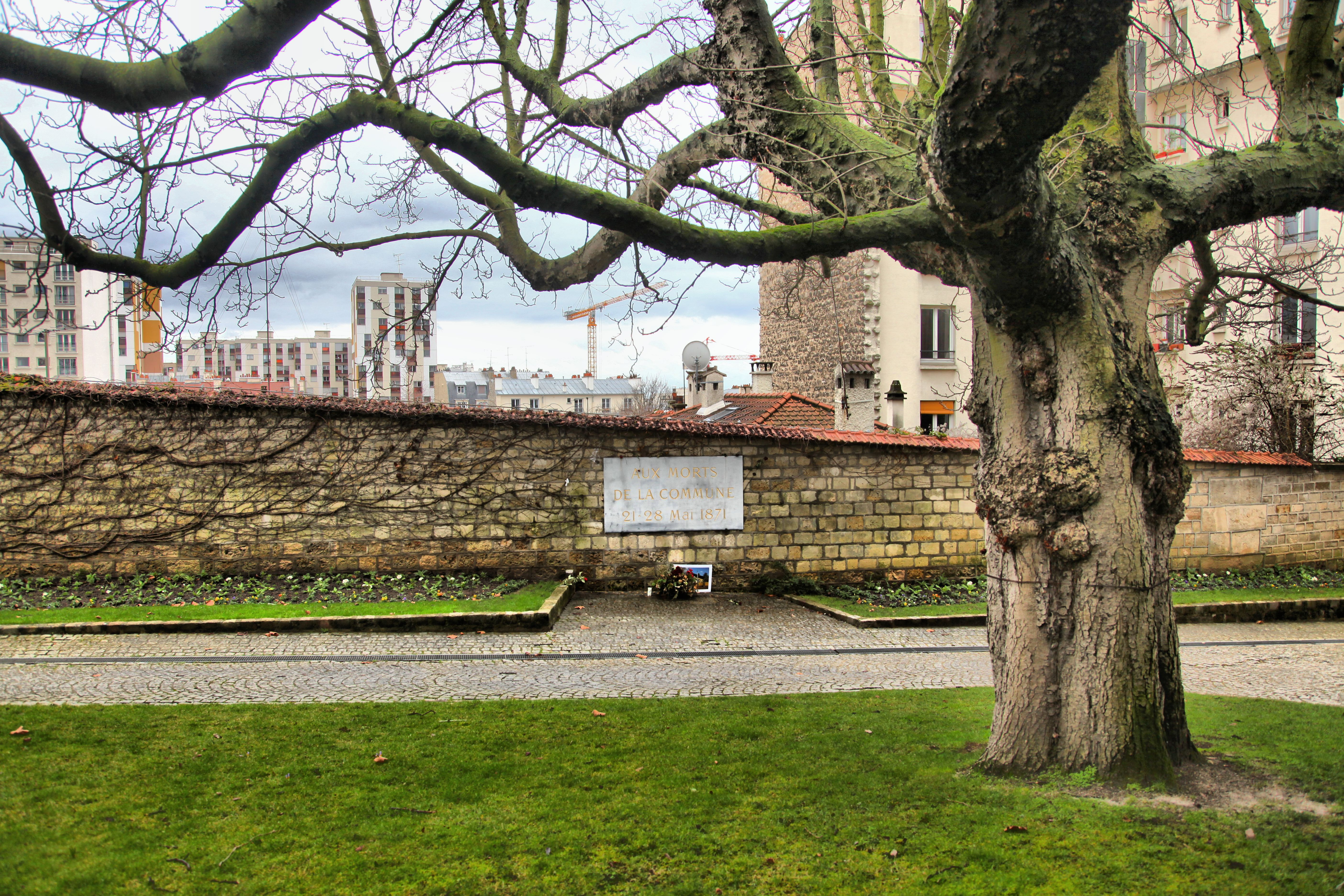
Communards' Wall at the Père Lachaise cemetery

- The term "fédérés" was revived during the Paris Commune. The Communards' Wall is known in French as the Mur de Fédérés.

=== 1964 ===
- Fœderatio Internationalis Una Voce, a federation of Roman Catholic lay organizations founded in 1964.

== Sources ==
- Godineau, Dominique (1998). The Women of Paris and Their French Revolution. Berkeley: University of California Press. ISBN 0-520-06718-5.
- MacLehose, Sophia H. (1904). From the monarchy to the republic in France, 1788–1792. Glasgow: J. MacLehose & Sons. p. 405. OCLC 1898577.
- Schama, Simon (1989). Citizens: A Chronicle of the French Revolution. New York: Vintage. ISBN 0-679-72610-1.
- Soboul, Albert (1975). The French Revolution 1787–1799. New York: Vintage. ISBN 0-394-71220-X.
