= Militant feminism in the French Revolution =

In pre-revolutionary France, most women had little formal part in affairs outside the house. Before the revolution and the advent of feminism in France, women's official role in society consisted of providing heirs for their husbands and tending to household duties. While women in the upper classes played an influential role in society through the literary salon, women in general were dismissed as simpletons, unable to understand or give a meaningful contribution to the philosophical or political conversations of the day. However, with the emergence of ideas such as liberté, égalité, and fraternité, the women of France joined their voices to the chaos of the early revolution. This was the beginning of feminism in France. With demonstrations such as the Women's March on Versailles, and the Demonstration of 20 June 1792, women displayed their commitment to the Revolution. Both the Declaration of the Rights of Woman and of the Female Citizen and the creation of the Society of Revolutionary Republican Women further conveyed their message of women's rights as a necessity to the new order of the revolution.

== Inequality during revolution ==
During the revolution, doctors and scientists played a significant role in the way society viewed women. Many doctors hypothesized that women could not partake in politics and other aspects of the government since their physiology and anatomy were so different than the physiology and anatomy of men. Scientists, doctors, and people of related professions stated that those with compacted skulls could not practice or follow the sciences (Nature's Body 7).

Women's participation in politics was considered useless since men were to keep their wives', daughters', sisters', and loved ones' values and needs in mind.

Women were thought to have the same beliefs, ideals, and desires for France as the men.

== Women's march to Versailles ==
The Women's March to Versailles is an example of protofeminist militant activism during the French Revolution. Though the march was overwhelmingly made up of women by all accounts, they did not make explicitly feminist demands. In the years preceding the Revolution, there was a food shortage in France. People all over the country grew agitated and called for a guarantee of food, with insufficient response from the monarchy. In October 1789, women in the marketplace of Paris began marching to Versailles, spurred on by revolutionists. As they marched, they drew a large gathering, culminating in the siege of the palace and the royal family being transported to the Tuileries Palace.

Though the crowd was led by men such as Stanislas-Marie Maillard, the women's call for bread and their persistence to see their demands met, set the tone for the subsequent events led by women in the Revolution. Their resolve is exemplified by an account of a woman participating in the march, the woman Cheret. "The honorable members of the National Assembly, coming to understand that the women were absolutely committed to persist until there was something definite for always, accorded to our twelve deputies." While the march was not an inherently feminist event, the women of the march recalled the victory of "our citizenesses clothed in glory, returned by carriage at his majesty's expense, to the city hall in Paris." The women of the march were remembered by posterity of the French Revolution as "Mothers of the Nation."

== Demanding arms ==
Pauline Léon, on March 6, 1791, submitted a petition signed by 319 women to the National Assembly requesting permission to form a garde national in order to defend Paris in case of military invasion. Léon requested permission be granted to women to arm themselves with pikes, pistols, sabers, and rifles, as well as the privilege of drilling under the French Guards. Her request was denied. Later in 1792, Théroigne de Méricourt made a call for the creation of "legions of amazons" in order to protect the revolution. As part of her call, she claimed that the right to bear arms would transform women into citizens.

== Participation in demonstrations ==
On October 5, 1789, over eight hundred women overtook the Hotel de Ville. The women burned all of the papers and files that they found since none of the papers and files had any benefit towards their rights as French citizens. They also searched the hotel for arms and ammunition. The women did not find any ammunition. They did, however, find pikes and two cannons. They took the pikes and cannons and were then followed by Lafayette's national guard. The national guard was sent to subdue the protests.

Moreover, suppression of women's participation by the state and private citizens was regular and common. In October of 1793, when a group of women protested and complained to the National Convention that radical "women militants" were attempting to make all women to wear "red cap of liberty" to signify revolution, male politicians like Philippe Fabre d’Eglantine demanded the "freedom of dress" for all women while he denounced "all women’s coalitions."

At times, women in the radical movement had to publish works to counter accusations made against them and their organizations and participation in the revolutionary activities after the French Revolution in 1789. For example, on September of 1793, Claire Lacombe published a political pamphlet accusations made against her and "concerning what took place 16 September at the Jacobin Club," and in this pamphlet she expressed her opinions on the charges against her and her organization. The Committee of General Security (CGS) charged Claire Lacombe and the Society of Revolutionary Republican Women of being counterrevolutionary because she wanted the Mayor of Toulouse to be released, because he was a nice gentleman who "gave bread to the poor," but the CGS representative Chabot reminded Claire Lacombe that the mayor had put many revolutionaries in jail regularly without any substantiated evidences or proofs, and the only evidence was that he was guilty of being a privileged nobleman who was "rich enough to live in Paris." In response to CGS allegations and accusation, Claire Lacombe responded that two other administrators were arrested along with the mayor, but the administrators were released and the mayor was not released, as this hypocrisy was creating a dangerous arbitrary precedent for justice and the rest of the revolution. The concerns of Claire Lacombe and the Society of Revolutionary Republican Women were with the appearance of justice as a standard format, not an arbitrary format that can be changed at the will of a revolutionary leader. Moreover, the main concern of the Revolutionary Women oppression and mainly against the oppression of patriots, as they sought to release people who were wrongfully imprisoned, and if guilty they needed to face the guillotine, swiftly. According to Claire Lacombe, CSG Representative Monsieur Chabot’s goal was "to destroy the Society of Revolutionary Women" without any shred of evidence other than when she lobbied for the release of Mayor of Toulouse. This is a demonstration of how revolutionary women’s participation created friction amongst other revolutionaries who were men, and this friction was a mixture of gender-based discrimination in conjunction with conflicts arising from different revolutionary organizations’ goals, such as the format of justice, the delivery of justice, and how it ought to be enforced in the revolutionary government after the French Revolution, as opposed to the old oppressed regimes.

In February of 1792, Parisian women participated in riots over the price of sugar. The following year, in February of 1793, women again played a leading role in demonstrations demanding action to reduce the price of food supplies.

On June 20 of 1792, a number of armed women took part in a procession that "passed through the halls of the Legislative Assembly, into the Tuileries Gardens, and then through the King's residence." Militant women also assumed a special role in the funeral of Jean-Paul Marat, following his murder on July 13, 1793. As part of the funeral procession, they carried the bathtub in which Marat had been murdered as well as a shirt stained with Marat's blood.

Later, on May 20, 1795, women were at the fore of a crowd that demanded "bread and the Constitution of 1793." When their protest went unnoticed, the women went on a rampage, "sacking shops, seizing grain and kidnapping officials."

== Women's role in society ==
Although most people in society believed that women should not partake in politics and should stay at home and raise the children, some women did play an important role in politics. This is not focusing on the protests that many women in France were a part of. Those protests shaped the political scene in France during the Revolution. During the French Revolution, women were able to write and publish political journals. The Tribune des femmes and Foi nouvelle: Livre des actes were political journals that were mainly written and published by women. The companies that published these journals had to pay a stamp tax that was only needed when a political journal was being published, therefore, making these two journals political. After the Gazette des femmes was published, the government stepped in and banned women's ability to publish daily political journals specifically.

== Declaration of the Rights of Woman and of the Female Citizen ==
While largely ignored in their endeavors to increase the rights of citizens in the Declaration of the Rights of Man and of the Citizen, activists such as Pauline Léon and Théroigne de Méricourt agitated for full citizenship for women. Yet, women were "denied political rights of 'active citizenship' (1791) and democratic citizenship (1793)." In 1791, Olympe de Gouges published a vital document of the Revolution, the Declaration of the Rights of Woman and of the Female Citizen. In it, de Gouges replicated the Declaration of the Rights of Man and of the Citizen, but altered the language to reflect the concerns of women's rights within France. She addressed her declaration to the Queen, Marie Antoinette, pleading with her to "work for the restoration of morals, to give to your sex all the credit it is due."

While this document did not have extensive social repercussions within France during the time of the Revolution, de Gouges revealed the depths of misogynistic culture by the reaction to her work. Following her publication, she was tried as having "royalist tendencies", further evidenced by her political pamphlets and discovery of her half-written play, La France sauvée ou le tyran détrondé. Though according to de Gouges, the accusation was based on a misunderstanding of her texts as anti-revolutionary, feminist historian Janie Vanpée took the stance that her trial was "not one of holding opinions from the wrong side of the political spectrum, but rather of articulating political opinions at all." De Gouges' execution in 1793, one of only three women to be executed in the Reign of Terror, solidified her appraisal of men within the Revolution as "pretend[ing] to enjoy the Revolution and reclaim his rights to equality only to say nothing more about it."

== Society of Revolutionary Republican Women ==
The most radical militant feminist activism was practiced by the Society of Revolutionary Republican Women which was founded by Léon and her colleague Claire Lacombe on May 10, 1793. The goal of the club was "to deliberate on the means of frustrating the projects of the enemies of the Republic." Up to 180 women attended the meetings of the Society. Of special interest to the Society was "combating hoarding [of grain and other staples] and inflation."

== Support ==
Condorcet was a strong advocate for women's rights. He believed that by not allowing women to partake in politics, it would deny them rights that men were entitled to, and it would deny rights to the legislators who vote to fill political positions. The legislators would not be able to vote for a woman to hold a position in the government even if they believed she was fit for the position. According to Condorcet, women were just as capable as men, except when it came to war. He believed that women were not as capable as men in war because of the differences in body structure, physique, and the need to take a leave of absence when their child is born.

== Reaction ==
Most of these outwardly activist women were punished for their actions. The kind of punishment received during the Revolution included public denouncement, arrest, execution, or exile. Théroigne de Méricourt was arrested, publicly flogged and then spent the rest of her life sentenced to an insane asylum. Pauline Léon and Claire Lacombe were arrested, later released, and continued to receive ridicule and abuse for their activism. Many of the women of the Revolution were even publicly executed for "conspiring against the unity and the indivisibility of the Republic."

== Legacy ==
These are but a few examples of the militant protofeminism that was prevalent during the French Revolution. While little progress was made toward gender equality during the Revolution, the activism of French women and protofeminists was bold and particularly significant in Paris. Though French culture during the time of the Revolution was largely misogynistic, leading women such as Madame Roland, Olympe de Gouges, and Charlotte Corday went against the traditional roles of gender and fought the mindset of a woman as passive, uneducated, and politically ignorant. According to author and historian Catherine R. Montfort, "a woman is always a woman biologically, but the ways in which she can be one are constructed by her culture." The effects on women's rights of the French Revolution is debated among historians. For some, the French Revolution eroded women's right by decreasing the role of women in public life due to the repressive measures that were brought into place by the Jacobins. However, for others, the change in psyche that allowed women to establish a gender-based consciousness and the reforms to marriage, divorce and property rendered a significant and ground breaking change to feminist identities and the future of the feminist movement.
