= Jean Théophile Victor Leclerc =

French newspaper editor

Jean Théophile Victor Leclerc (French pronunciation: [ʒɑ̃ teɔfil viktɔʁ ləklɛʁ]), a.k.a. Jean-Theophilus Leclerc and Theophilus Leclerc d'Oze (1771–1820), was a radical French revolutionary, publicist, and soldier. After Jean-Paul Marat was assassinated, Leclerc assumed his mantle.

Leclerc was the son of a civil engineer and joined the National Guard in Clermont-Ferrand at the outbreak of revolution in 1789. He then went to Martinique as a merchant's agent. However, his militant pro-revolutionary stance brought him into conflict with the planter aristocracy, who soon expelled him for revolutionary propaganda in 1791. He returned to metropolitan France and joined the 1st battalion of Morbihan in which he served until February 1792, when he left for Paris to defend seventeen grenadiers accused, in Martinique, of being revolutionaries. He successfully defended them in front of the Jacobin Club and the revolutionary national assembly. On April first that year he made a speech before the Jacobin Club calling for the execution of King Louis XVI and Queen Marie Antoinette.

Leclerc returned to his military duties with the Army of the Rhine, and was sent on an unsuccessful spy mission across the Rhine in southwest Germany. It seems that he was betrayed by Dietrich, the mayor of Strasbourg. In November 1792, he fought at the Battle of Jemappes. In February 1793 he was transferred to the General Staff of the newly restructured Army of the Alps, in Lyon. It was there that he joined the Club Central and he was sent to Paris as a special deputy from Lyon.

Leclerc took an extremely radical revolutionary position, even being expelled from the Jacobin Club for being too radical. He was a founding member of Les enragés (literally "the Angry Ones") who opposed Jacobian leniency. In 1793, he married Pauline Léon, who together with Claire Lacombe had founded the Société des républicaines révolutionnaires, a radical and revolutionary feminist organization which was banned the following year. He and his wife published a broadsheet called L'Ami du peuple par Leclerc starting in 1793, which advocated a radical purging of the army, the creation of a revolutionary army made up exclusively of the partisans of the Reign of Terror, and the execution of all the suspected anti-revolutionaries. His publishing activities ceased with his arrest in April 1794. After his release in August 1794, he and his wife maintained a low profile until his death in 1820.
