= Anne Félicité Colombe =

French printer and political activist

Anne Félicité Colombe (1760-1843), was a French printer and publisher, and a political activist during the French Revolution. She published the radical journals L'Ami du Peuple and l'Orateur du Peuple.

She was the owner and proprietor of the Henri IV printshop at the Place Dauphine in Paris. She was a newspaper publisher and participated in the public debate during the revolution. She published Jean-Paul Marat's journal L'Ami du Peuple (1790), which caused her newspapers to be seized and she was interrogated as to where Marat could be found. After the Champ-de-Mars fusillade, she was one of four women to be arrested on 17 July 1791.

She had militant revolutionary sympathies, and was a prominent member of the Society of Revolutionary Republican Women in 1793. She was described as generous, and after she was acquitted from the libel lawsuit of 1790, she gave to the poor of her neighborhood the twenty thousand livres that her accuser Etienne was condemned to pay her.

== Publications ==
- "L'Ami du peuple" of Jean-Paul Marat in 1790-1791
- "L'Orateur du peuple" in 1790-1791
- "Le Père Duchesne", in 1791-1792
- "Journal du faubourg Saint-Antoine" in 1791
- "Journal des débats de la Société des amis de la Constitution, séante aux Jacobins" in 1791-1793
- "Le Thermomètre du jour" in 1792

== See also ==
- List of journals appearing under the French Revolution

== Sources ==
- Dominique Godineau: The Women of Paris and Their French Revolution
- Imprimerie de Henri IV. Paris
