= Communards' Wall =

Monument in Paris

Coordinates: 48°51′35″N 2°23′59″E

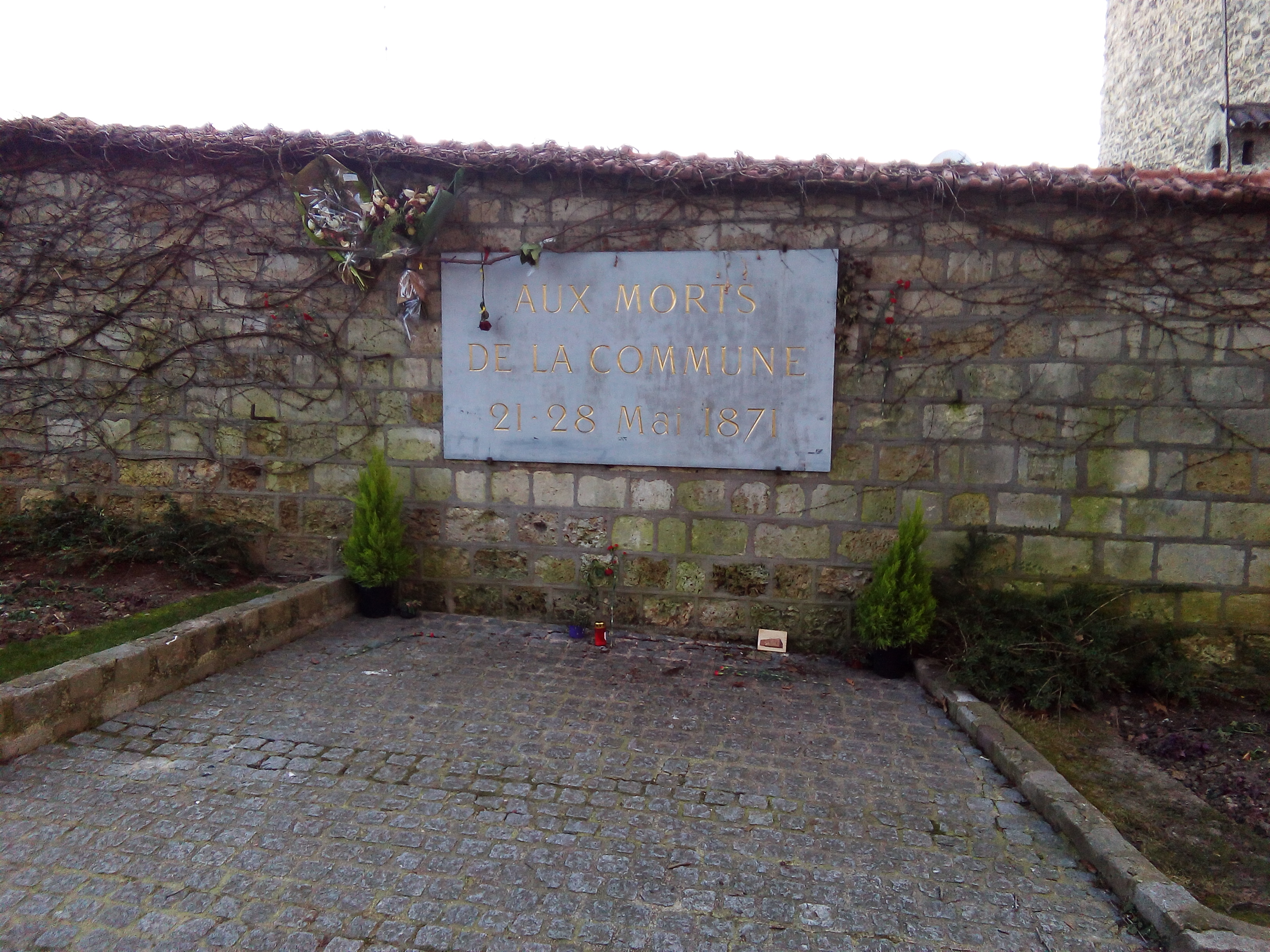
Communards' Wall at the Père Lachaise cemetery

The Communards’ Wall (French: Mur des Fédérés) at the Père Lachaise cemetery is where 147 Commune soldiers along with another 19 officers were executed on May 28, 1871, during the Semaine sanglante, the suppression of the Paris Commune. The soldiers were buried in a common grave at the foot of the wall.

The Père Lachaise cemetery was established in May 1804 on a land owned by the Jesuits for centuries, and where Père ("Father") Lachaise, confessor of Louis XIV, lived the latter part of his life. The cemetery of the aristocracy in the 19th century, it also received the remains of famous people from previous eras. During the spring of 1871 the last of the combatants of the Commune entrenched themselves in the cemetery. The French Army, which was summoned to suppress the Commune, won control toward the end of the afternoon of May 28 and captured the remaining Commune soldiers. As with other prisoners taken during the Commune, those captured with weapons in hand, numbering 147, were lined up and executed. Those executed at the wall also included a group of Commune officers, who had been captured earlier at other locations, imprisoned in two army barracks nearby, tried by military tribunals, sentenced to death, and delivered to the cemetery for execution and burial. This brought the total number to an estimated but unconfirmed 166. They were all buried in the same common grave.

The number executed and buried at the wall there is not known exactly, but is estimated at 166 by historian Michele Audin. Other casualties were brought to the cemetery later from other parts of the city and buried in the cemetery. The wall is now the site of an annual commemoration of the Commune and its casualties.

== See also ==
- Communards
- Semaine sanglante

== Bibliography ==
- Audin, Michele, La Semaine Sanglante, Mai 1871, Legendes et Conmptes, Libertalia Publishers (2021) (in French)
- Tombs, Robert (2021). La guerre contre Paris -1871: l'ármée met fin à la Commune. Paris: Flammarion. ISBN 978-2-0802-4351-5.
