= Hélène Dorlhac =

French politician (1935–2026)

Secretary of State for Families and Senior Citizens
- In office 28 June 1988 – 15 May 1991
- President: François Mitterrand
- Preceded by: Georgina Dufoix (Secretary of State for Families); Catherine Trautmann (Minister of State for Senior Citizens)
- Succeeded by: Laurent Cathala

Secretary of State for Prison Conditions
- In office 8 June 1974 – 25 August 1976
- President: Valéry Giscard d'Estaing
- Preceded by: position established
- Succeeded by: position abolished

Personal details
- Born: Hélène Roujon; 4 October 1935 Sumène, France
- Died: 4 March 2026 (aged 90) Nîmes, France
- Party: UDF
- Education: University of Montpellier School of Medicine
- Occupation: Doctor

Hélène Dorlhac de Borne (French: [elˈɛn dɔʁlˈak dˈə- bˈɔʁn]; née Roujon; 4 October 1935 – 4 March 2026) was a French politician of the Union for French Democracy (UDF).

== Life and career ==
Born in Sumène on 4 October 1935, Dorlhac was the daughter of Louis Roujon, the commune's former mayor. She graduated from the University of Montpellier School of Medicine with a diploma in occupational medicine. In the 1970s, she joined the National Federation of the Independent Republicans and joined the pro-Valéry Giscard d'Estaing club Perspectives et Réalités.

Dorlhac supported d'Estaing during the 1974 presidential election and was assigned to the president's cabinet as Secretary of State for Prison Conditions, a position in which she saw poor prison conditions for youth and was faced with several prison riots. Her work focused primarily on the humanization of the prison system within the framework of the penal policies of the Ministry of Justice. She left her post following a cabinet reshuffle in 1976 and her ministerial post was discontinued.

During the 1988 presidential election, Dorlhac supported eventual victor François Mitterrand and came out of her retirement to accept a position as Secretary of State for Families and Senior Citizens. She was a driving force behind laws aimed at the prevention of child abuse, including the 119 child abuse hotline. She also initiated campaigns to prevent pedophilia. On 29 and 30 September 1989, she took part in the first ever World Summit for Children at the United Nations. That year, she contributed to the drafting of the Convention on the Rights of the Child, which was adopted on 20 November 1989 and championed a law on the protection of child models in 1990. She left her ministerial post on 15 May 1991. From 1991 to 2000, she was a General Inspector of Social Affairs.

Dorlhac was married to Jacques Dorlhac de Borne, a general practitioner with whom she had three children. She died in Nîmes on 4 March 2026, at the age of 90.

== Decorations ==
- Officer of the Legion of Honour (2008)
- Officer of the Ordre national du Mérite

== Publications ==
- Changer la prison (1984)
