= Mariette Sineau =

French political scientist

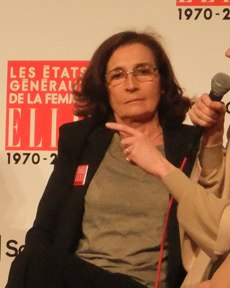
- Mariette Sineau at ELLE's The State of Women in May 2010
- Alma mater: Instituts d'études politiques
- Scientific career
- Fields: Political science; Sociology
- Institutions: Sciences Po; French National Centre for Scientific Research

Mariette Sineau is a French political scientist and sociologist, currently the research director at the French National Centre for Scientific Research. Her research focuses on gender in politics, as well as sociological notions of parity and fairness.

== Career ==
Sineau graduated from the Instituts d'études politiques in 1996, with a thesis entitled La politique: un enjeu majeur dans les rapports de pouvoir entre sexes (Politics: a major issue in power relations between the sexes). She then joined the political science research centre of the Sciences Po, before becoming the director of research at the French National Centre for Scientific Research.

Her research interests have centered around the role of gender in politics, the capacity of women to access political power, and the notion of fairness in politics. She is a member of the gender parity research institution founded by former President of France Jacques Chirac, and of the French liberal think tank Terra Nova.

In 2001, she published the book Profession, femme politique: sexe et pouvoir sous la Cinquième République (Profession, political woman: Sex and power in the French Fifth Republic). She completed this work in 2011 by publishing Femmes et pouvoir sous la Cinquième République: de l'exclusion à l'entrée dans la course présidentielle (Women and power in the Fifth Republic: Exclusion from entering the presidential race). This book presents an assessment of the changes that followed after was passed in France in 2000 to promote the equal access of women and men to electoral mandates and elective offices.

Following the candidacy of Ségolène Royal in the 2007 French presidential election, Sineau published La force du nombre : femmes et démocratie présidentielle (Strength in numbers: women and presidential democracy). This book delivers an analysis of Royal's performance and campaign. In that analysis, Sineau underlines the paradox underlying the small proportion of women in the French National Assembly and the growing number of legislative measures intended to benefit women.

Her work on women's representation and political parity has appeared in media outlets like Le Monde, Elle, France Culture, the Japan Times, and France 24.

== Selected works ==
- Des femmes en politique, Paris, Economica, 1988, 240 p. ISBN 2-7178-1410-8
- Profession femme politique: sexe et pouvoir sous la Cinquième République, Paris, Presses de Sciences po, 2001, 305 p. ISBN 2-7246-0853-4
- La force du nombre: femmes et démocratie présidentielle, La Tour-d'Aigues, Éditions de l'Aube, 2010, 206 p. ISBN 978-2-8159-0031-7
- Femmes et pouvoir sous la Cinquième République: de l'exclusion à l'entrée dans la course présidentielle, Paris, Presses de la Fondation nationale des sciences politiques, 2011, 324 p. ISBN 978-2-7246-1220-2
