= Society of Revolutionary Republican Women =

1793 French female-led revolutionary organization

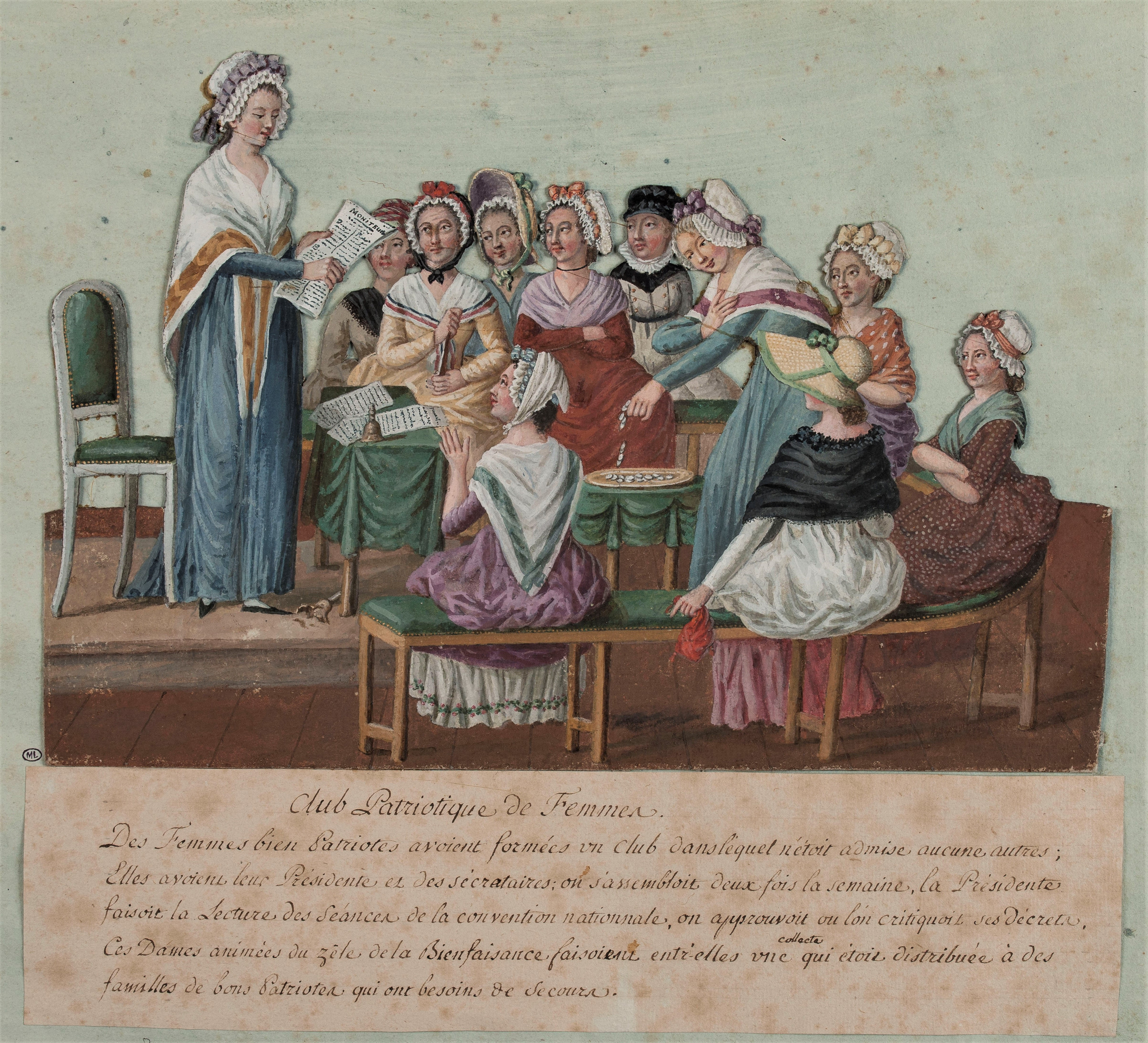
Club Patriotique de Femmes, c. 1792–1794, Jean-Baptiste Lesueur

The Society of Revolutionary and Republican Women (Société des Citoyennes Républicaines Révolutionnaires, Société des républicaines révolutionnaires) was a female-led revolutionary organization during the French Revolution. The Society officially began on May 10, 1793, and disbanded on September 16 of the same year. The Society managed to draw significant interest within the national political scene, advocating for gender equality in revolutionary politics.

== Background ==
After the beginning of the French Revolution, discussions around the role of women in French society grew, giving rise to a letter addressed to the King Louis XVI dated on January 1, 1789, and entitled "Pétition des femmes du Tiers-État au roi" (transl. "Petition of women of the Third Estate to the King") declaring the need for equality in educational opportunities between men and women. The letter encompassed the demands of French women and requested general equality between the sexes.

Their movement was further solidified by the Women's March on Versailles on October 5, 1789 which demanded bread from King Louis XVI. Although women played many parts in the French Revolution, the march was the first event consisting entirely of women. The feminist newspaper Étrennes nationales des dames published an article calling on women to take an active role in the National Assembly and reminding them of the 5th of October when women took a stand.

In these early years, Dutch feminist Etta Palm d'Aelders published a pamphlet proposing that a group of women's clubs should be organized throughout the country to initiate a welfare program. In that pamphlet, she wrote,

"Would it not be useful to form, in each Section of the capital, a patriotic society of citoyennes [women citizens] ... [who] would meet in each Section as frequently as they believed useful for the public good and following their own particular rules; each circle would have its own directorate...Thus, it would be in a position to supervise efficiently the enemies harbored in the midst of the capital and to differentiate the genuinely poor person in need of his brothers’ aid from brigands called out by enemies."

The political clubs in France at the time were predominantly men-only and excluded women. Only through mixed fraternal societies were women able to take part in politics. When clubs with women-only membership began to pick up steam, they became very popular in the provinces. While most women understood that the majority of these clubs aimed to support men in the army, some women wanted to fight alongside them. Today, historians have identified approximately thirty women's clubs that began during this period.

The clubs organized themselves, each having a presiding body which laid out rules for their specific clubs. These clubs had a membership range of two hundred to six hundred members, with an active attendance of approximately sixty members.

Over time, the women's clubs began to widen their political scope and include other issues in their meetings. Soon, the issue of citizenship began to emerge. Not only did they want the title of citizen, or citoyenne, a designation as an inhabitant of the country, but also the rights and responsibilities that came with being a citizen. One woman went before the National Convention to say,

"Citizen legislators, you have given men a Constitution; now they enjoy all the rights of free beings, but women are very far from sharing these glories. Women count for nothing in the political system. We ask for primary assemblies and, as the Constitution is based on the Rights of Man, we now demand the full exercise of these rights for ourselves."

In 1791, a women's rights activist Olympe de Gouges published one of the most prominent women's rights documents of that time period, The Declaration of the Rights of Woman and of the Female Citizen. This document introduced the issue of women's rights directly into the French Revolution. It argued that sexual equality had a place in the revolution and that women deserved equal rights.

== Origins ==
In 1793, the Jacobins, the leading political force of the era, were now allied with the sans-culottes and the Cordeliers, a radical political club in Paris. The coalition of these groups took a far-left position, supporting price controls and, what most deemed, ruthless punishments against those who disputed their views. Rivaling them were the Girondins, who maintained support for a free market.

In February 1793, a group of women from the Section des Quatre Nations requested the use of the meeting hall of the Jacobins, for a meeting of their own. The Jacobins refused. Some say that they feared a "massive women's protest." The group of women, who now called themselves the Assembly of Republican Women, persisted and received permission from the Fraternal Society of Patriots of Both Sexes to use their meeting hall. This Assembly's main aim was toward economic stability. However, for some they had larger aspirations and wanted to strive for more political activity.

On May 10, 1793, the Society of Revolutionary Republican Women was formed. Though it was a feminist society, its primary purpose was in defending the revolution. Founders of the society, Pauline Léon and Claire Lancombe, officially registered "The Society of Revolutionary Republican Women" at the Paris Commune. Historian Dominique Godineau writes,

"Several citoyennes presented themselves to the secretariat of the municipality and declared their intention of assembling and forming a society which admits only women. The Society has for its objective deliberation on the means of frustrating the projects of the republic's enemies. It will bear the name of Revolutionary Republic Society and will meet in the library of the Jacobins, rue Saint-Honoré."

== National influence ==
Rules and regulations were soon established, and soon the Society was a major political player. Several accounts report that the women of the Society would wear red caps of liberty to signify their alliance with the Revolution. They began to have regular meetings and attend National Convention assemblies, which were open to the public. At the Convention, members of the galleries would cheer at speeches they agreed with and make a general ruckus at ones they disagreed with. The Girondins grew tired of the heckling and designated specific galleries for Girondin supporters. The Society was outraged, and at their next meeting, a motion was passed to take direct action to prevent it. From then on, women from the Society would stand guard at the doors to these specific galleries, preventing their entry. The Society also worked jointly with the Cordeliers club on several occasions. On May 19, they presented to the Convention a joint delegation to demand harsher laws for counter-revolutionaries and those suspected of being counter-revolutionaries.

Very soon after came the uprising of May 31 to June 2. Around 30 Girondins were expelled from the Convention, leaving the Montagnards as the main political force. The Society aided the insurrection, supporting the radical Jacobins of the Mountain. When the new Montagnard Constitution was adopted in late June, the Society praised it and the Convention, joining in celebratory festivities. They continued to support the new policies and delegations presented by the Jacobins.

On July 13, 1793, Jean-Paul Marat, a left-wing radical whom the Society admired, was stabbed to death by Girondin-sympathizer Charlotte Corday, who hated Marat's radical leftist paper, L'Ami du peuple. During Marat's funeral, the Society women carried the bathtub he was murdered in and threw flowers on his body. On July 24, the Society swore to raise an obelisk in memory of his legacy, which was erected on August 18. The Society remained politically inactive from the time of Marat's death to the day the obelisk was completed. Afterward, they vowed to focus on the issue of national security.

The Society soon began to drift away from the Jacobins and toward the Enragés, a political group led by Jacques Roux, Jean Varlet and Théopile Leclerc, which supported strict economic control and harsh national security. The Society began to feel that the Montagnards were not inclusive enough of the radical demands of the leftist Enragés.

In September, the Society campaigned for numerous petitions, helping enact much of the legislation throughout the month. Pierre Roussel reported hearing at a meeting of the Society a proposal "to present to the Convention, a call for a decree obliging women to wear the national cockade." This petition became very influential in the history of the Society. On September 21, as per the Society's demands, the National Convention declared that all women must wear the tricolor cockade of the revolution. Many women hated the decree and refused to wear the cockade. Market women had already begun to turn on the Society and they opposed the Society's views on price controls, among other issues.

== Dissolution ==
September 16, 1793, marked the beginning of the end for the Society. Claire Lacombe, then president of the Society, was publicly denounced by the Jacobins to the Committee of General Security, who accused her of "making counterrevolutionary statements" and having associated and aided a "notorious counterrevolutionary, the Enragé Leclerc". Lacombe was briefly detained, then set free, but the seed of distrust had been planted. The Society tried relentlessly to continue to petition the Convention, but most of the issues that they dealt with were deemed more trivial and less radical than their previous campaigns.

Around the same time, women, especially merchants, began to grow weary of women wearing the cockade and red liberty bonnets. Violence started in the streets between those women who supported the cockades, notably the Society for Revolutionary Republican Women, and those who did not. The market women went to the Convention with their problems and petitioned that the Society be abolished. On October 30, 1793, the National Convention decreed that "clubs and popular societies of women, under whatever denomination, are forbidden". The Society of Revolutionary Republican Women was officially dissolved, despite numerous protests by leading figures in the club. Historian Olwen Hufton writes,

"The sans culotte, Chaumette said when he dissolved women's clubs in October 1793, [that he] had a right to expect from his wife [to attend to] the running of his home while he attended political meetings: hers was the care of the family: this was the full extent of her civic duties."

== Club organization and regulation ==
The Society of Revolutionary Republican Women had a very organized governing system. The presiding officers consisted of:

- Club President – Elected for one month at a time
- Club Vice-President – Elected for one month at a time
- Four Secretaries – Elected for one month at a time
- Club Treasurer – Elected for three months at a time
- Two Assistant Treasurers – Elected for three months at a time
- One Archivist – Elected for three months at a time
- One Assistant Archivist – Elected for three months at a time
- Two Monitors – Elected for one month at a time

There were three committees in the Society: the Administration Committee, the Relief Committee and the Correspondence Committee. These committees each had twelve elected members each. All of the voting within the Society was done by roll-call voting.

The Society itself had around one hundred seventy members, of which around one hundred were regularly attending meetings. To become a member, one had to be "presented by a member and seconded by two more members", and she had to take an oath "to live for the Republic or die for it". There was also a minimum age of eighteen, but women were allowed to bring their children with them.

== Prominent members ==
- Pauline Léon, co-founder and president
- Claire Lacombe, co-founder
- Anne Félicité Colombe, radical publisher
- Constance Evrard, cook, associate of Pauline Leon, honored by the Revolution de Paris for having proposed to join the "battalion of tyrannicides".

== See also ==
- Fraternal Society of Patriots of Both Sexes
