= Pauline Léon =

French feminist activist and revolutionary politician (1768–1838)

Pauline Léon (28 September 1768 – 5 October 1838) was an influential woman during the French Revolution. She played an important role in the Revolution, driven by her strong feminist and anti-royalist beliefs. Léon served as a prominent leader of the Femmes Sans-Culottes and in May 1793 founded the Society of Revolutionary Republican Women (Société des Républicaines-Révolutionnaires) with Claire Lacombe, another prominent female revolutionary.

== Biography ==
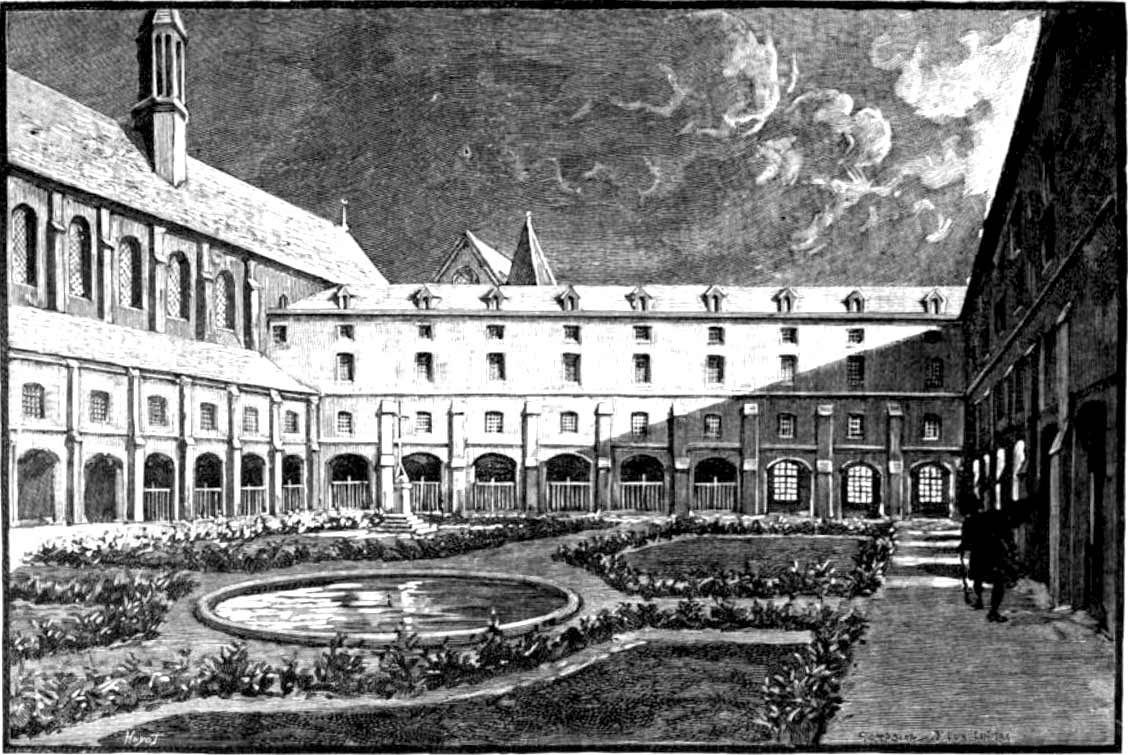
A drawing of the Cordeliers Club

Léon was born to chocolate makers Pierre-Paul Léon and Mathurine Telohan in Paris on 28 September 1768. She was one of six children. When her father died in 1784, Léon began helping her mother with the chocolate business in exchange for room and board. She was also responsible for helping to raise and support her siblings until the time of her marriage.

Throughout Léon's life, she became entrenched in the politics of the Revolution. She affiliated herself with radical anti-royalist groups such as the Cordeliers club and the Enragés, the most militant arm of the revolution.

It was through these affiliations that she met Théophile Leclerc, a leader of the Enragés, who fought violently for the creation of a French direct democracy. The two were married in 1793 when Pauline was 25 years old.

In April of the next year, because of their radical revolutionary acts, the Committee of General Security issued a warrant for their arrest. They were arrested together but held separately in Luxembourg Palace which had been converted into a prison. Because they had committed no major crimes, they were released three months later after Robespierre died.

After her release from prison, Léon began to withdraw from politics, focusing her efforts on her household and her occupation as a schoolteacher.

Léon died at age 70 on 5 October 1838 in the city of Bourbon-Vendée, now known as La Roche-sur-Yon.

== Role ==
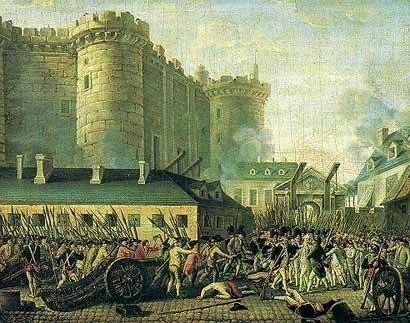
The Storming of the Bastille

The French Revolution generated political excitement and sometimes violent unrest. Witnessing this unrest stirred Léon to action, and she became a radical for the revolutionary cause. In 1789 at the beginning of the Revolution, she joined in the famous Storming of the Bastille, even carrying her own pike. In 1791, she again joined a passionate political crowd and risked her life by signing the Cordeliers' republican petition at the Champ de Mars. The petition demanded the creation of a French republic and its signing coincided with a massive protest. The protest was violently quelled, resulting in the Champ de Mars Massacre which left between a dozen and fifty people dead.

Her political leanings were no secret. For years, Léon openly protested against all of the following: Lafayette and his royalist wartime opinions, King Louis XVI and the system of French monarchy, and anyone who was openly a counter-revolutionary.

As was mentioned above, Léon's official political loyalties were with the Cordeliers Club and the Enragés. Being a part of those groups fueled her revolutionary spirit, and she stood with them even when it landed her in prison for several months.

Léon's political involvement in the Revolution is especially noteworthy because she came from the Parisian artisan class, while most other politically involved women of her day were aristocratic.

== Feminism ==
The Revolution was a time of great debate concerning the status and right of women from all social classes. The entire governmental structure was in question, and men all over France were exploring the ideas of natural rights. In these unique circumstances, many French women seized the opportunity to call into question the rights of women as well, and what constituted their proper place in society. While people like Jean-Jacques Rousseau worked to create a limited domestic image of womanhood, others like Olympe de Gouges fought to pioneer women's rights. Léon observed this and became passionately involved in this emerging feminist cause.

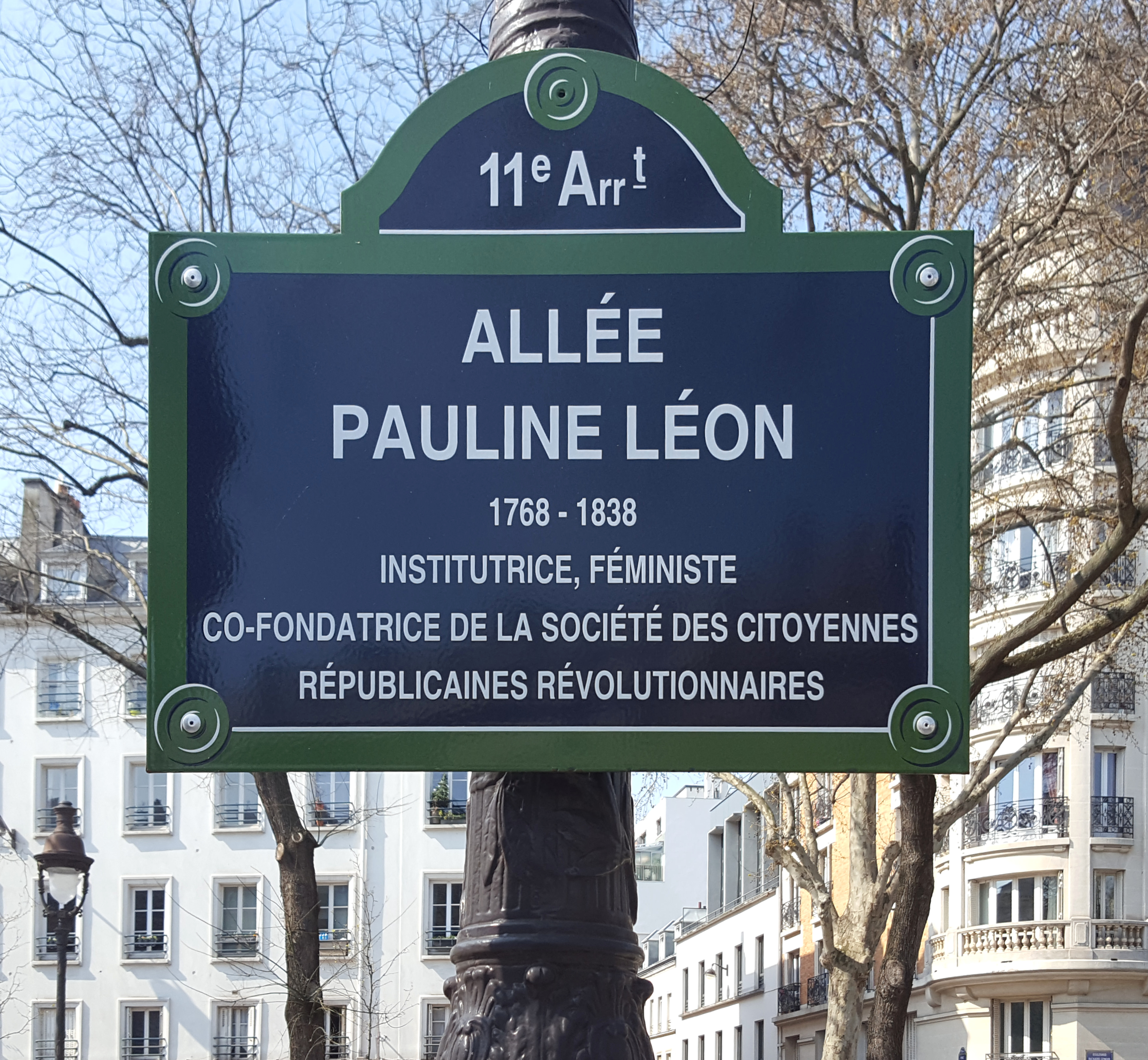
A sign in France recognizing Pauline Léon as the co-founder of the Society of Revolutionary Republican Women

On 6 March 1791 she addressed the Legislative Assembly on behalf of Parisian women, calling for the creation of an all-female militia so that women could protect their own homes from counter-revolutionary assaults. More than 300 Parisian women had signed the petition she was presenting. Her idea of the female militia was strikingly radical because it would include the women having the right to bear arms. This right that was closely associated with full citizenship, and had hardly ever been considered appropriate or necessary for women. Although the militia Léon wanted was never formed, many French women still fought how they could in the conflicts associated with the French Revolution. Léon, along with her friend Claire Lacombe, founded the Society of Revolutionary Republican Women (Société des Républicaines-Révolutionnaires) and became its president on 9 July 1793. In that same year, she also served as a prominent leader of the Femmes Sans-Culottes. Her position as president of the Société was brief, however, because it lasted only eight months. It was shut down by authorities because it was judged by both Girondins and Jacobins as a dangerous organization that opposed proper womanhood. At its height, however, the Society's meetings were attended by up to 200 people.

== Writings ==
Although Léon was very active in the public sphere, either she did not write much, or not many of her writings have been preserved. The following are a couple of exceptions:

One of her surviving writings is her "Petition to the National Assembly on Women's Rights to Bear Arms," which she presented on 6 March 1791. The petition asserted that the new French Constitution was for women as well as men, meaning that they required the arms necessary to defend it. She promised that French women still held dear their roles as wives and mothers, and that their possession of the right to bear arms would not detract from this. The petition concluded with a declaration of female French patriotism.

A statement Léon wrote while imprisoned in Luxembourg on 4 July 1794 has also survived. In it, she highlighted her personal involvement in the Revolution and her recruitment of many others to the revolutionary cause. She made pointed mention of her hatred toward Lafayette and confirmed the rumor that she once broke into a man's home to throw a bust of Lafayette out the window. She wrote highly of the sans-culottes and the Cordeliers club. Her statement concluded with an assertion that she and her husband were innocent and did nothing to merit an arrest.
