= Claire Lacombe =

French actress, revolutionary, women's rights activist

- Born: 4 August 1765; Pamiers, Kingdom of France
- Died: 2 May 1826 (aged 60); Paris, France
- Occupations: Actress; Revolutionary

Claire Lacombe (4 August 1765 – 2 May 1826) was a French actress, revolutionary, and women's rights activist during the French Revolution. She was a founding member of the Society of Revolutionary Republican Women, a political club of largely working-class women that agitated for participatory democracy and policies addressing the basic needs of urban workers, who suffered from high food prices and food shortages.

== Early life ==
Lacombe was born into poverty in the provincial town of Pamiers in southwestern France. She became an actress at a young age and appeared in theatrical productions "somewhere in southern France, probably Marseille" She arrived in Paris in 1792. The actress, in her mid-twenties, was "self-assured, self-assertive, and self-dramatizing, all useful qualities for making one's mark on the revolutionary scene."

== Revolutionary career ==
Lacombe first attracted attention in Revolutionary politics in late July 1792, when she gave a well-received speech to the National Constituent Assembly. In her speech, she pledged to fight for her country "with the courage of a Roman and with the hatred of tyrants" and promised to help with the extermination of "Neros and Caligulas". She also asked to be recruited into the army. At the time, revolutionary France was facing military threats from the royal houses of Europe. The speech was given the ‘honors of the session’ (a distinction) and was printed by the Assembly.

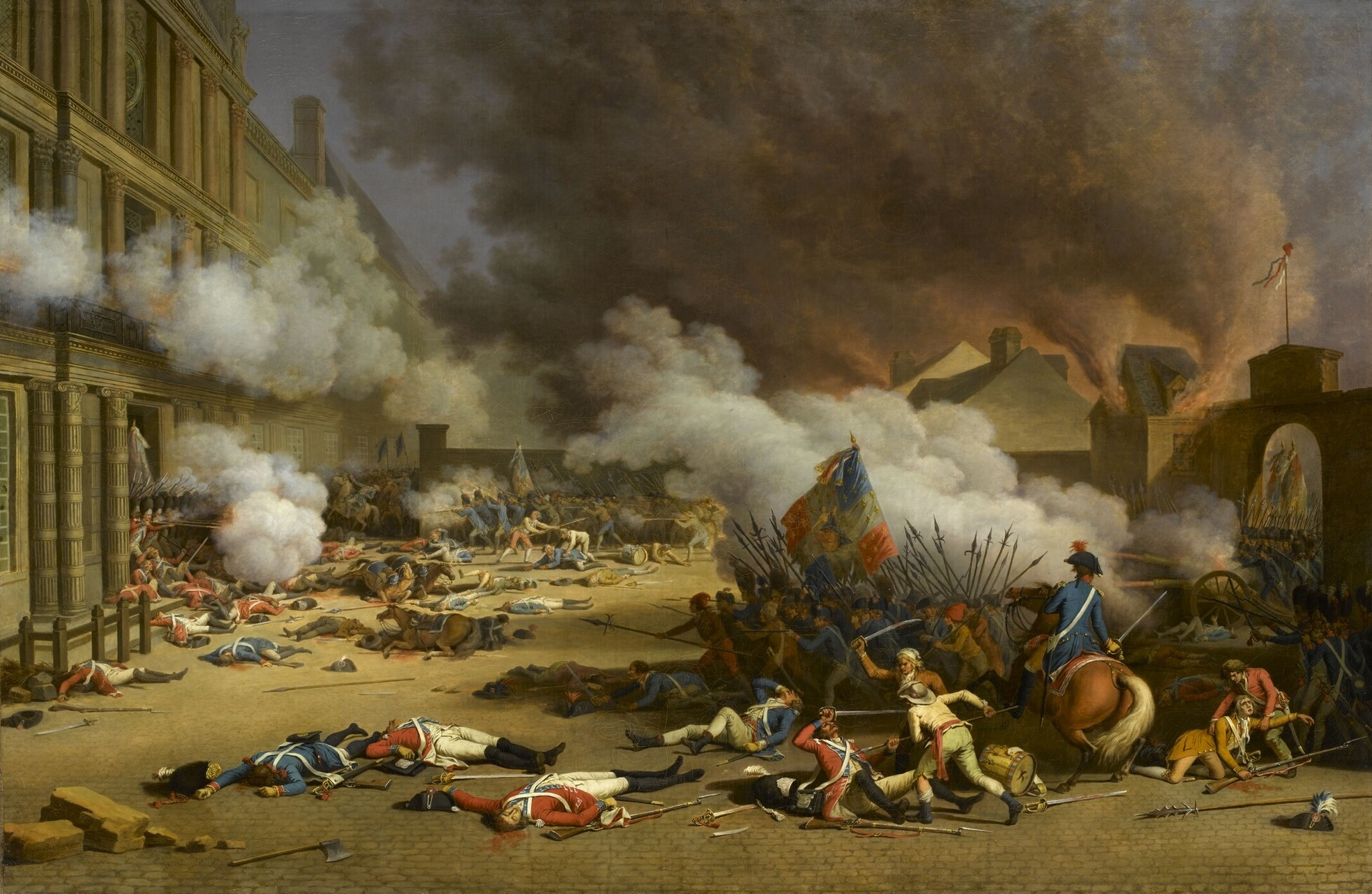
Capture of the Tuileries Palace, August 10, 1793

Indeed, Lacombe made good on her commitment to fight. She and other women were active in the street combat that was part and parcel of the revolutionary process. In particular, during the insurrection of 10 August 1792, Lacombe fought with the rebels during the storming of the Tuileries Palace, which was protected by the mercenary Swiss Guard. Hundreds of Swiss guardsmen and 400 revolutionaries were killed in the battle. Along with Théroigne de Mericourt and Reine Audu, Lacombe rallied the revolutionary forces, who were under fire. She was shot through the arm but kept on fighting, earning herself the lifelong sobriquet, "Heroine of August Tenth". For her bravery, she was awarded a couronne civique (transl. civic crown) by the victorious fédérés.

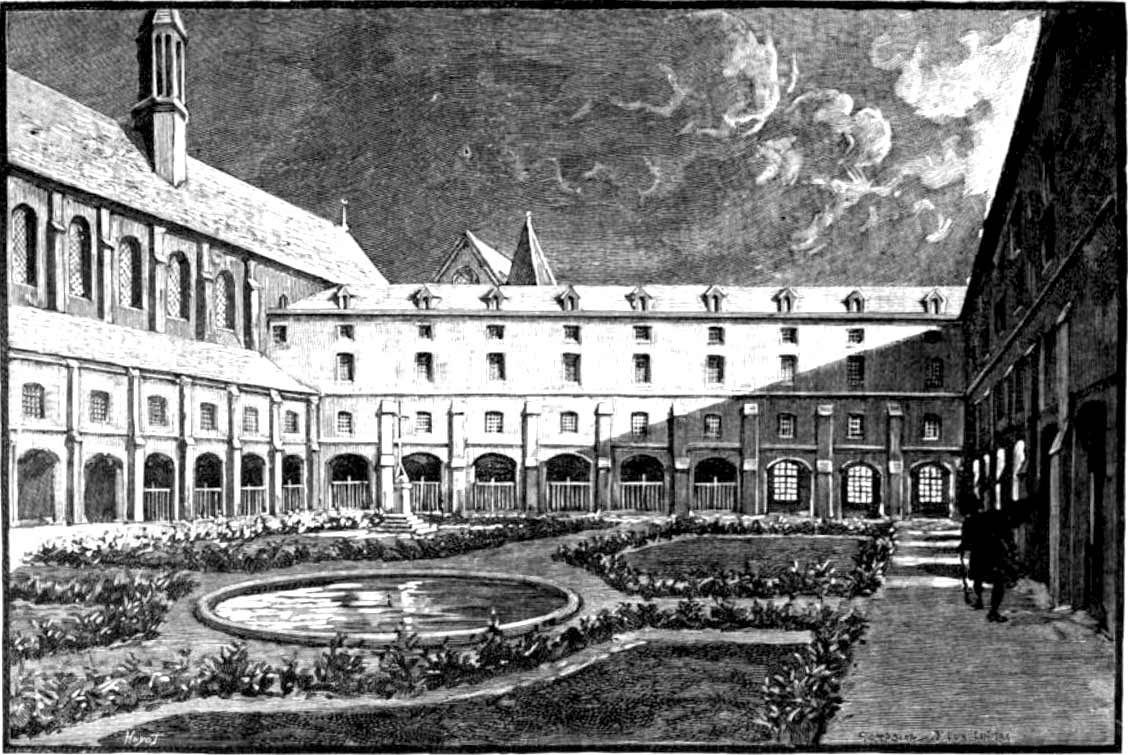
A drawing of the Cordeliers Club

After acquiring a certain level of recognition due both to her public speaking and her abilities in insurrectionary combat, Lacombe strengthened her position as a political actor. She was a frequent attendee at meetings of the Cordeliers Club, through which she became involved with the most radical elements of the Revolution. Lacombe was outspoken and opinionated in her ideas, and although women were not explicitly granted political rights, Lacombe found ways to be active and participate politically. Her involvement in the revolutionary politics of France pushed the boundary of what it meant to be a female citizen at the time.

=== Society of Revolutionary Republican Women ===
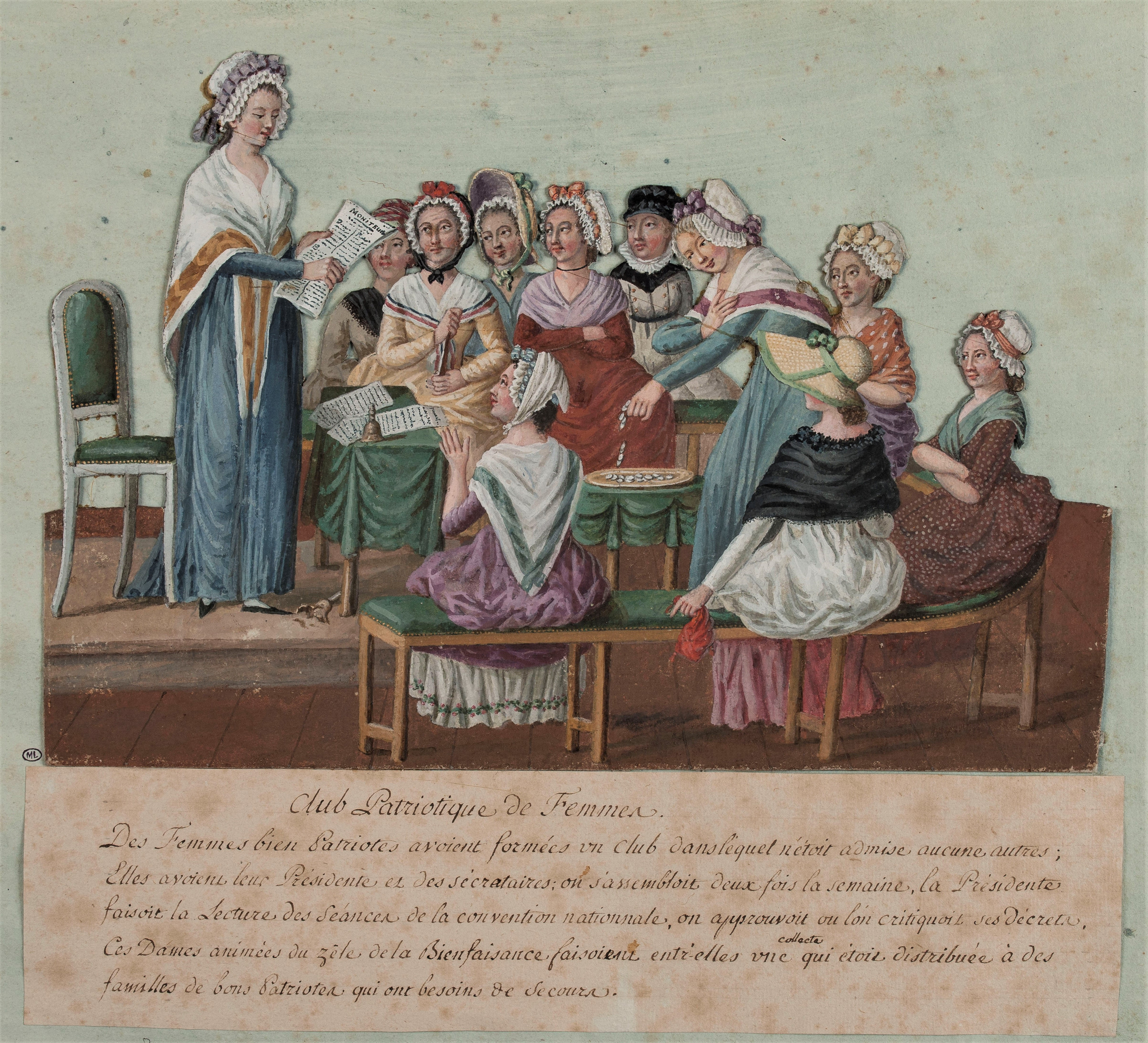
Club patriotique de femmes, gouache by Jean-Baptiste Lesueur, 1791, musée Carnavalet.

In February, 1793, Lacombe and another female revolutionary, Pauline Léon, founded "the most famous of women’s clubs," the Society of Revolutionary Republican Women. Composed chiefly of working-class women, the Society was aligned with the most militant revolutionaries, the sans-culottes and enragés. They "demanded not just the execution of royalty and the rooting out of the aristocracy, but a social and economic program to restrict… the speculator, the stock-jobber, the hoarder, and to enact a system of fixed, 'just' prices, controlled markets and supplies." In this sense, the Revolutionary Republicans' programme was, in the first instance, economic and not overtly feminist. However, they did demand that the universal male suffrage created in the Constitution of 1793 (but not implemented) be extended to women. They championed reforms in prisons and practical education for girls. The Society also functioned as a fighting force, and employed tactics to intimidate people that they considered to be anti-revolutionaries.

Almost from the outset, the French Revolution, including its most radical elements, encountered difficulties incorporating women's rights into their broader principles of human rights. This debate took place within a societal context in which women of all classes were almost entirely without political or civil rights. For example, women had no right to vote; men had total legal authority over their wives; and female children received a non-existent or inferior education relative to males. When the women from the bourgeoisie asked to be included in the emerging framework of human rights, the reigning institutions (including the Jacobian political movement) were initially quite receptive. Indeed, many bourgeois demands were enacted into law, such as the promulgation in 1792 of a divorce decree; setting the age of legal majority at 21 for both sexes; and establishing the right of women to testify in certain civil suits. But when working-class women started to militate by asking for "disruptive" measures to increase the supply of bread in cities and to prevent price fixing and hoarding, this support evaporated.

Despite the deeply entrenched chauvinism of the time, there were a few men among the revolutionaries who supported the fight for women's rights. One of these was Théophile Leclerc, with whom Lacombe lived for a while, until he left her to marry Pauline Léon.

=== Demise of the Society ===
On September 16, 1793, Lacombe, then president of the Society, was publicly denounced by the Jacobins to the Committee of General Security. Lacombe was quoted as stating, "Monsieur Robespierre [was a] coward who feared for his days." They accused her of "making counter-revolutionary statements," and having lived with and aided a "notorious counter-revolutionary, the enragé Leclerc". Lacombe was arrested by order of the Committee of General Security, but, for unknown reasons, she was quickly released.

She defended herself vigorously to the working-class women in her Society and continued her political activities. However, the signs of what was to come were already evident for the group, which was seen by the Revolutionary government as uncontrollable and no longer politically useful. The Society nevertheless continued its activism, carrying petitions to the convention. These asked for policies that would "rehabilitate prostitutes through useful work and indoctrination" and called for "the enforcement of price fixing laws" and sans-culottes policing of warehouses through "domiciliary visits."

This activism would soon be brought to a complete stop. In late October 1793, a violent confrontation took place between Society members and the bourgeois owners of food stalls in Les Halles (the main food market of Paris, which was located right across from the headquarters of the Society in the Saint-Eustache Church). The violence occurred when the Revolutionary Republicans tried to force the more conservative women of les Halles (the main food market in Paris) to wear the bonnet rouge (a revolutionary hat).

The confrontation resulted in the market women laying charges against the women of the Society, including Claire Lacombe. This gave the Jacobins "the excuse they were looking for" to get rid not only of Claire Lacombe, but also of all women's political organizations. It took only one day for the Committee of General Security to prepare its report and recommendations on these charges. The report focused on two general questions: "should women exercise political rights and meddle in (s'immiser) the affairs of government? And should women take part in political societies?" The report's negative answer to both of these questions cited several reasons: making the necessary investment in political organization would cause women to "sacrifice the more appropriate cares to which Nature assigns them." Also, women were not thought to have the "self discipline, dispassion, limitless self-sacrifice" required to exercise political rights. The National Convention adopted these recommendations unanimously on 30 October 1793.

== End of Lacombe’s political career ==
Barred from any political activity, Lacombe attempted to return to her acting career. On April 2, 1794, she was arrested as she prepared to leave for a theater in Dunkirk. Pauline Léon and her husband, Leclerc, were arrested the following day. Lacombe was released from prison on 20 August 1795, by order of the Committee of General Security. She was imprisoned one year longer than Léon and Leclerc because, unlike them, she refused to condemn the Revolutionary government and Robespierre in order to please the Thermidorians during the Thermidorian Reaction (when Robespierre’s government gave way to a more moderate group).

After being released, Lacombe abandoned her political activities and resumed her career in acting. Numerous documents attest to the roles she played, mainly in Nantes. Ultimately, her career dwindled and she seems to have ended her life in poverty. Suffering from mental health problems, Lacombe was admitted to the Pitié-Salpêtrière Hospital on 19 June 1821, where her profession was recorded as "teacher" ("institutrice"). She died there on 2 May 1826, from a cardiac aneurysm.

== Bibliography ==
- Doyle, William (1990). The Oxford History of the French Revolution (2 ed.). Oxford; New York: Oxford University Press. ISBN 9780199252985.
- Kelly, Linda (1987). Women of the French Revolution. London: Hamish Hamilton. ISBN 978-0-241-12112-2.
- Fremont-Barnes, Gregory (2007). Encyclopedia of the age of political revolutions and new ideologies, 1760-1815. Greenwood Publishing Group. ISBN 978-0-313-33445-0.
- Godineau, Dominique (1998). The Women of Paris and Their French Revolution. Berkeley: University of California Press. ISBN 978-0-520-06718-9.
- Sokolnikova, Galina (1969) [1932]. Nine Women Drawn from the Epoch of the French Revolution. Freeport, NY: Books for Libraries Press. ISBN 978-0-8369-1314-9.
