= Women's March on Versailles =

1789 event during the French Revolution

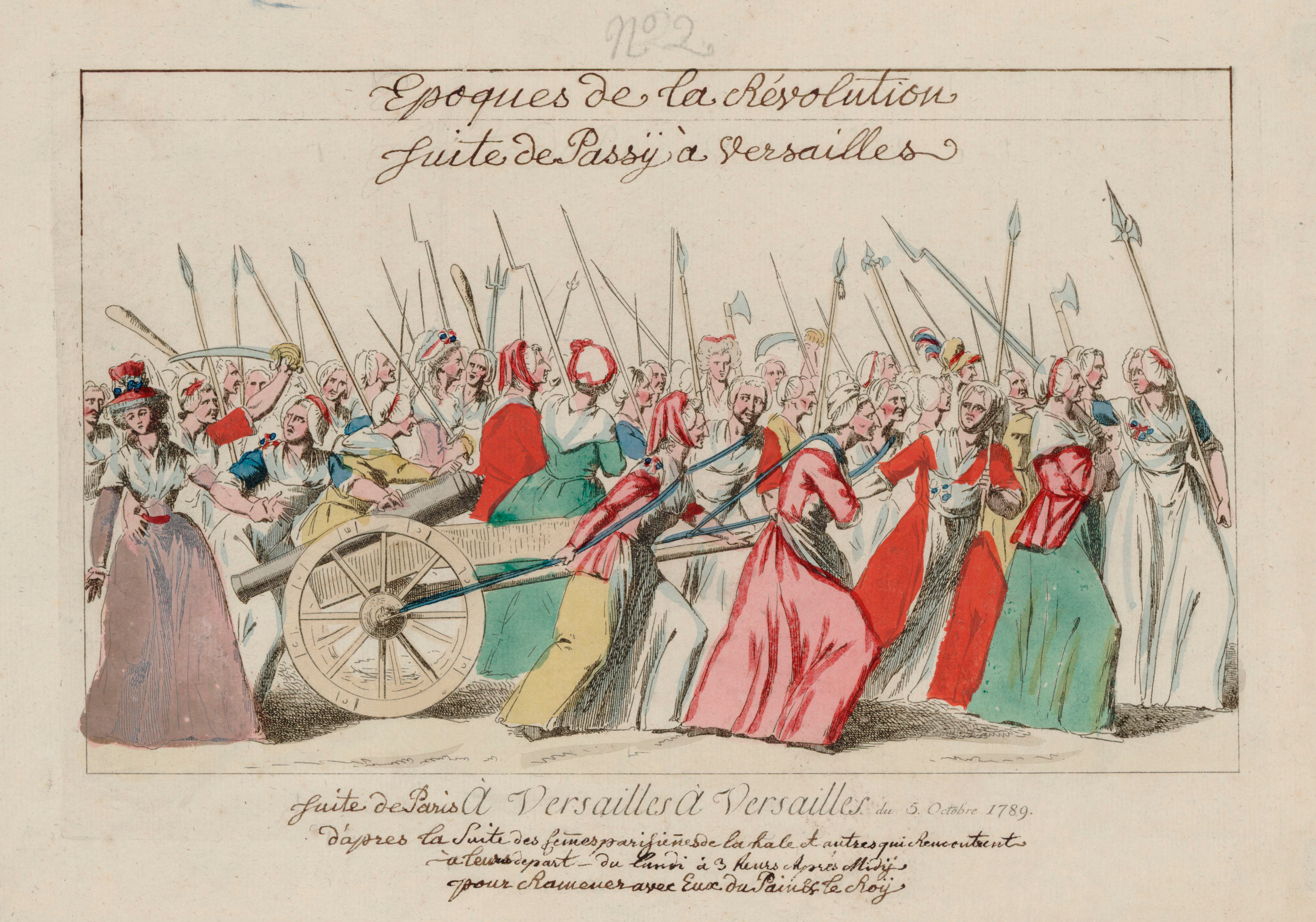
A contemporary illustration of the Women's March on Versailles, 5 October 1789

The Women's March on Versailles, also known as the Black March, the October Days, or simply the March on Versailles, was one of the earliest and most significant events of the French Revolution. The march began among women in the marketplaces of Paris who, on the morning of 5 October 1789, were rioting over the high price of bread. The unrest quickly became intertwined with the activities of revolutionaries seeking liberal political reforms and a constitutional monarchy for France. The market women and their allies ultimately grew into a crowd of thousands. Encouraged by revolutionary agitators, they ransacked the city armory for weapons and marched on the Palace of Versailles. The crowd besieged the palace and, in a dramatic and violent confrontation, they successfully pressed their demands upon King Louis XVI. The very next day, the crowd forced the king and his family to return with them to Paris. Over the next few weeks, most of the French assembly also relocated to the capital.

These events ended the king's independence and heralded a new balance of power that would ultimately displace the established, privileged orders of the French nobility in favor of the common people, collectively known as the Third Estate. By bringing together people representing the sources of the Revolution in their largest numbers yet, the march on Versailles proved to be a defining moment of the Revolution.

== Background ==
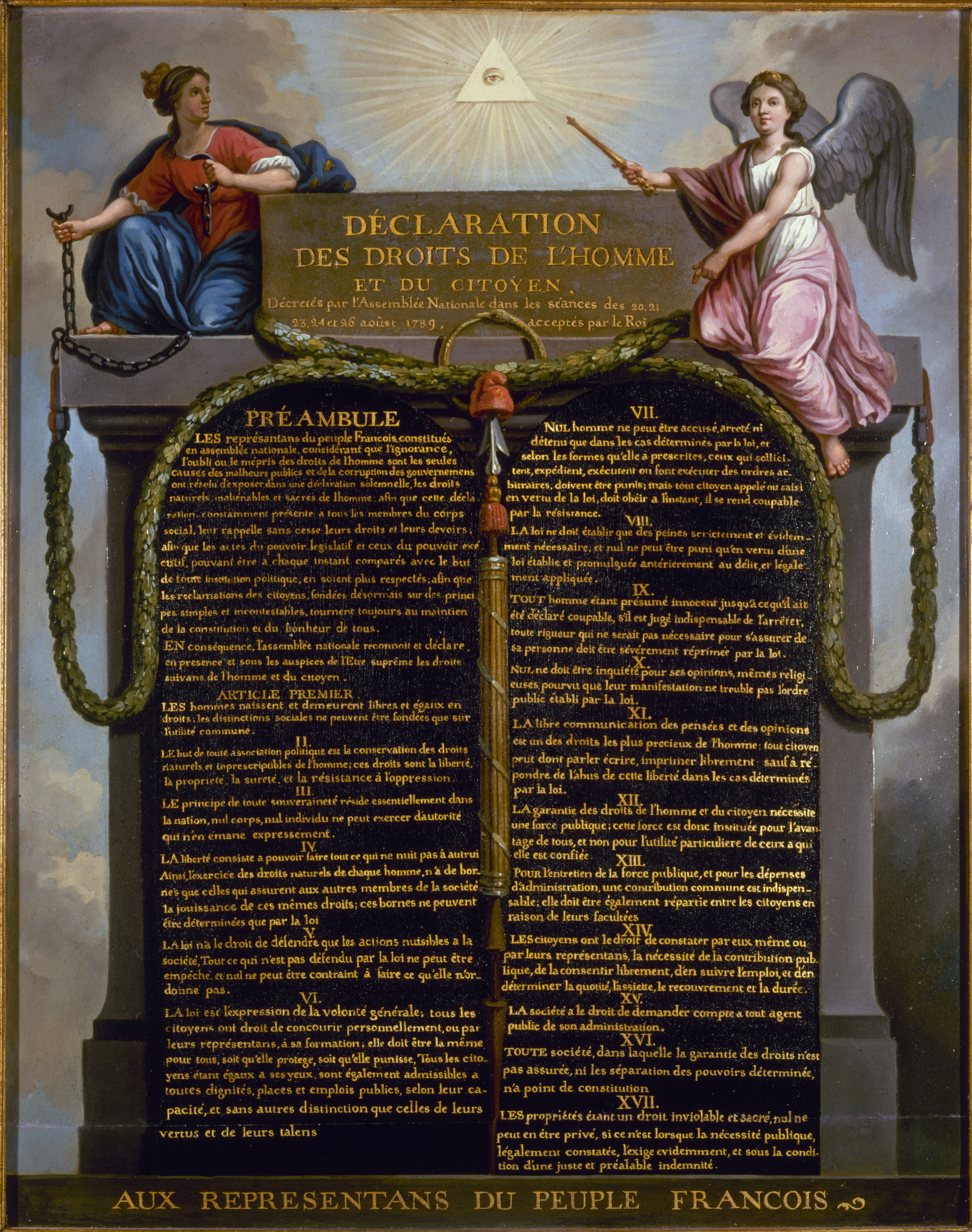
The revolutionary decrees passed by the assembly in August 1789 culminated in The Declaration of the Rights of Man and of the Citizen

Following poor harvests, the deregulation of the grain market in 1774 implemented by Turgot, Louis XVI's Controller-General of Finances was a main cause of the famine which led to the Flour War in 1775. At the end of the Ancien Régime, the fear of famine was ever-present for the lower strata of the urban Third Estate, and rumors of the "Pacte de Famine", ostensibly concluded to starve the poor, were rampant and readily believed. Mere rumors of food shortages led to the Réveillon riots in April 1789. Rumors of a plot to destroy wheat crops in order to starve the population provoked the Great Fear in the summer of 1789.

When the October journées (Note: Journée (literally, "[events of the] day") is used frequently in French accounts of the Revolution to denote any episode of popular uprising: thus the women's march is known most commonly in French as the "October Days". English historians have favored more descriptive names for the episodes, and the majority (see Doyle, Schama, Hibbert, Wright, Dawson, et al.) employ some variation of the phrase "women's march" in recognition of the market women's prominence as the vanguard of the action.) took place, France's revolutionary decade, 1789–1799, had only just begun. The storming of the Bastille had occurred less than three months earlier, but the Revolution's capacity for violence was not yet fully realized. Flush with their newly discovered power, the common citizens of France – particularly in Paris – began to participate in politics and government. The poorest among them focused almost exclusively on the issue of food: most workers spent nearly half their income on bread. In the post-Bastille period, price inflation and severe shortages in Paris were commonplace, as were local incidents of violence in the marketplaces.

The king's court and the deputies of the National Constituent Assembly resided comfortably in the royal city of Versailles, where they were considering momentous changes to the French political system. Reformist deputies had managed to pass sweeping legislation in the weeks after the Bastille's fall, including the revolutionary August Decrees (which formally abolished most noble and clerical privileges) and the Declaration of the Rights of Man and of the Citizen. Their attention then shifted to the creation of a permanent constitution. Monarchists and other conservatives had thus far been unable to resist the surging strength of the reformers, but by September their position was beginning to improve. During constitutional negotiations they were able to secure a legislative veto power for the king. Many of the reformers were left aghast by this and further negotiations were hobbled by discord.

Versailles, the seat of royal power, was a stifling environment for reformers. Their stronghold was in Paris. The bustling metropolis lay within walking distance, less than 21 kilometres (13 mi) to the northeast. The reformist deputies were well aware that the four hundred or more monarchist deputies were working to transfer the Assembly to the distant royalist city of Tours, a place even less hospitable to their efforts than Versailles. Worse, many feared that the King, emboldened by the growing presence of royal troops, might simply dissolve the Assembly, or at least renege on the August decrees. The King was indeed considering this, and when, on 18 September, he issued a formal statement giving his approval to only a portion of the decrees, the deputies were incensed. Stoking their anger even further, the King stated on 4 October that he had reservations about the Declaration of the Rights of Man.

=== Early plans ===
Contrary to post-revolutionary mythology, the march was not a spontaneous event. Numerous calls for a mass demonstration at Versailles had already been made; notably, the Marquis of Saint-Huruge, one of the popular orators of the Palais-Royal, had militated for just such a march in August to evict the obstructionist deputies who, he claimed, were protecting the King's veto power. Although his efforts were foiled, revolutionaries held onto the idea of a march on Versailles with the aim of compelling the King to accept the Assembly's laws. Speakers at the Palais-Royal mentioned it regularly, fanning suspicions that its proprietor, Louis Philippe II, Duke of Orléans, was secretly fomenting a mass action against Versailles. The idea of a march on Versailles was widespread and was even discussed in the pages of the Mercure de France (5 September 1789). Popular unrest was in the air and many nobles and foreigners fled.

=== Royal banquet ===
Following the mutiny of the French Guards a few hours before the storming of the Bastille, the only troops immediately available for the security of the palace at Versailles were the aristocratic Garde du Corps (body guard) and the Cent-Suisses (hundred Swiss). Both were primarily ceremonial units and lacked the numbers and training to provide effective protection for the royal family and the government. Accordingly, the Flanders Regiment (a regular infantry regiment of the Royal Army) was ordered to Versailles in late September 1789 by the king's minister of war, the Comte de Saint-Priest, as a precautionary measure.

On 1 October, the officers at Versailles held a welcoming banquet for the officers of the newly arrived troops, a customary practice when a unit changed its garrison. The royal family briefly attended the affair, walking amongst the tables set up in the opera house of the palace. Outside, in the cour de marbre (central courtyard), the soldiers' toasts and oaths of fealty to the king grew more demonstrative as the night wore on.

The lavish banquet was certain to be an affront to those suffering in a time of severe austerity, but it was reported in the L'Ami du peuple and other firebrand newspapers as nothing short of a gluttonous orgy. Additionally, the papers dwelt scornfully on the reputed desecration of the tricolor cockade; drunken officers were said to have stamped upon this symbol of the nation and professed their allegiance solely to the white cockade of the House of Bourbon. This tale of the royal banquet was a source of intense public outrage.

== Beginning of the march ==
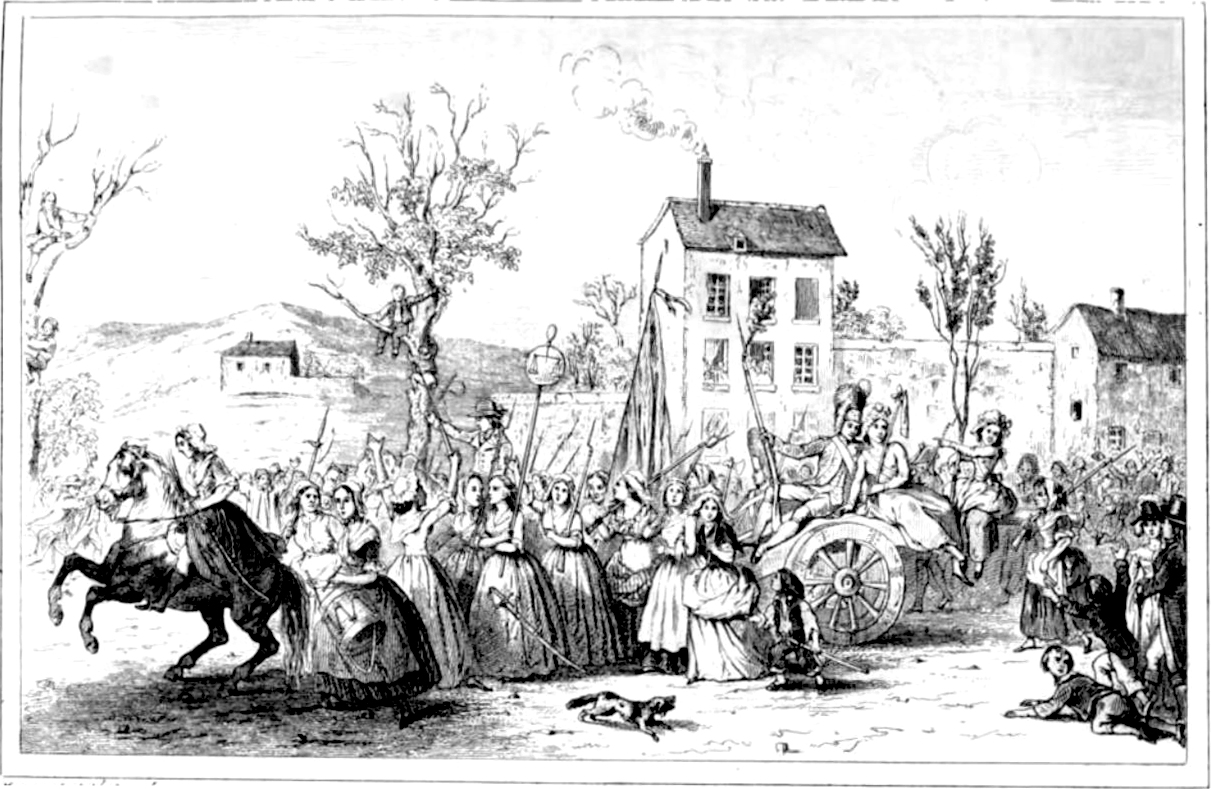
The women hailed by onlookers on their way to Versailles (illustration c. 1842)

On the morning of 5 October, a young woman struck a marching drum at the edge of a group of market-women who were infuriated by the chronic shortage and high price of bread. From their starting point in the markets of the eastern section of Paris known as the Faubourg Saint-Antoine, the angry women forced a nearby church to toll its bells. Their numbers continued to grow and with restless energy the group began to march. More women from other marketplaces joined in, many bearing kitchen blades and other makeshift weapons, as the tocsins rang from church towers throughout several districts. Driven by a variety of agitators, the mob converged on the Hôtel de Ville —the city hall of Paris (Note: The Paris City Hall is located on the Place de Grève, which was renamed Place de l'Hôtel de Ville in 1802.)— where they demanded not only bread, but also arms. As more and more women – and men – arrived, the crowd outside the city hall reached between six and seven thousand, and perhaps as many as ten thousand.

One of the men was the audacious Stanislas-Marie Maillard, a prominent vainqueur of the Bastille, who snatched up his own drum and led with the cry of "à Versailles!" Maillard was a popular figure among the market-women, and was given a leadership role by unofficial acclamation. Although hardly a man of gentle disposition, (Note: Carlyle repeatedly refers to him as "cunning Maillard" or "shifty Maillard".) Maillard helped, by force of character, to suppress the mob's worst instincts; he rescued the Hôtel de Ville's quartermaster, Pierre-Louis Lefebvre-Laroche, a priest commonly known as Abbé Lefebvre, who had been strung up on a lamppost for trying to safeguard its gunpowder storage. The City Hall itself was ransacked as the crowd surged through, confiscating its provisions and weapons, but Maillard helped to prevent the crowd from burning down the entire building. In due course, the rioters' attention turned again to Versailles. Maillard deputized a number of women as group leaders and gave a loose sense of order to the proceedings as he led the crowd out of the city in the driving rain.

As they left, thousands of National Guardsmen who had heard the news were assembling at the Place de Grève. The Marquis de Lafayette, in Paris as their commander-in-chief, discovered to his dismay that his soldiers were largely in favor of the march and were being egged on by agitators to join in. Even though he was one of France's greatest war heroes, Lafayette could not dissuade his troops and they began threatening to desert. Rather than see them leave as another anarchic mob, the Parisian municipal government told Lafayette to guide their movements; they also instructed him to request that the king return voluntarily to Paris to satisfy the people. Sending a swift horseman forward to warn Versailles, Lafayette contemplated the near mutiny of his men: he was aware that many of them had openly promised to kill him if he did not lead or get out of the way. At four o'clock in the afternoon, fifteen thousand National Guardsmen with several thousand more civilian latecomers set off for Versailles. Lafayette reluctantly took his place at the head of their column, hoping to protect the king and public order.

== Goals ==
The rioters had already availed themselves of the stores of the Hôtel de Ville, but they remained unsatisfied: they wanted not just one meal but the assurance that bread would once again be plentiful and cheap. Famine was a real and ever-present dread for the lower strata of the Third Estate, and rumors of an "aristocrats' plot" to starve the poor were rampant and readily believed.

The hunger and despair of the market women was the original impetus for the march, but what started as a search for bread soon took on other goals. Notably, there was common resentment against the reactionary attitudes prevailing in court circles even before the uproar sparked by the notorious banquet precipitated the political aspects of the march. Activists in the crowd spread the word that the King needed to dismiss his royal bodyguards entirely and replace them all with patriotic National Guardsmen, a line of argument that resonated with Lafayette's soldiers.

These two popular goals coalesced around a third, which was that the King and his court, and the assembly as well, must all be moved to Paris to reside among the people. Only then would the foreign soldiers be expelled, food supply would be reliable and France served by a leader who was "in communion with his own people". The plan appealed to all segments of the crowd. Even those who were supportive of the monarchy (and there were many among the women) felt the idea of bringing home le bon papa was a good and comforting plan. For revolutionaries, the preservation of their recent legislative victories and the creation of a constitution were of paramount importance and a lockdown of the King within reformist Paris would provide a propitious environment for the revolution to succeed.

== Siege of the palace ==
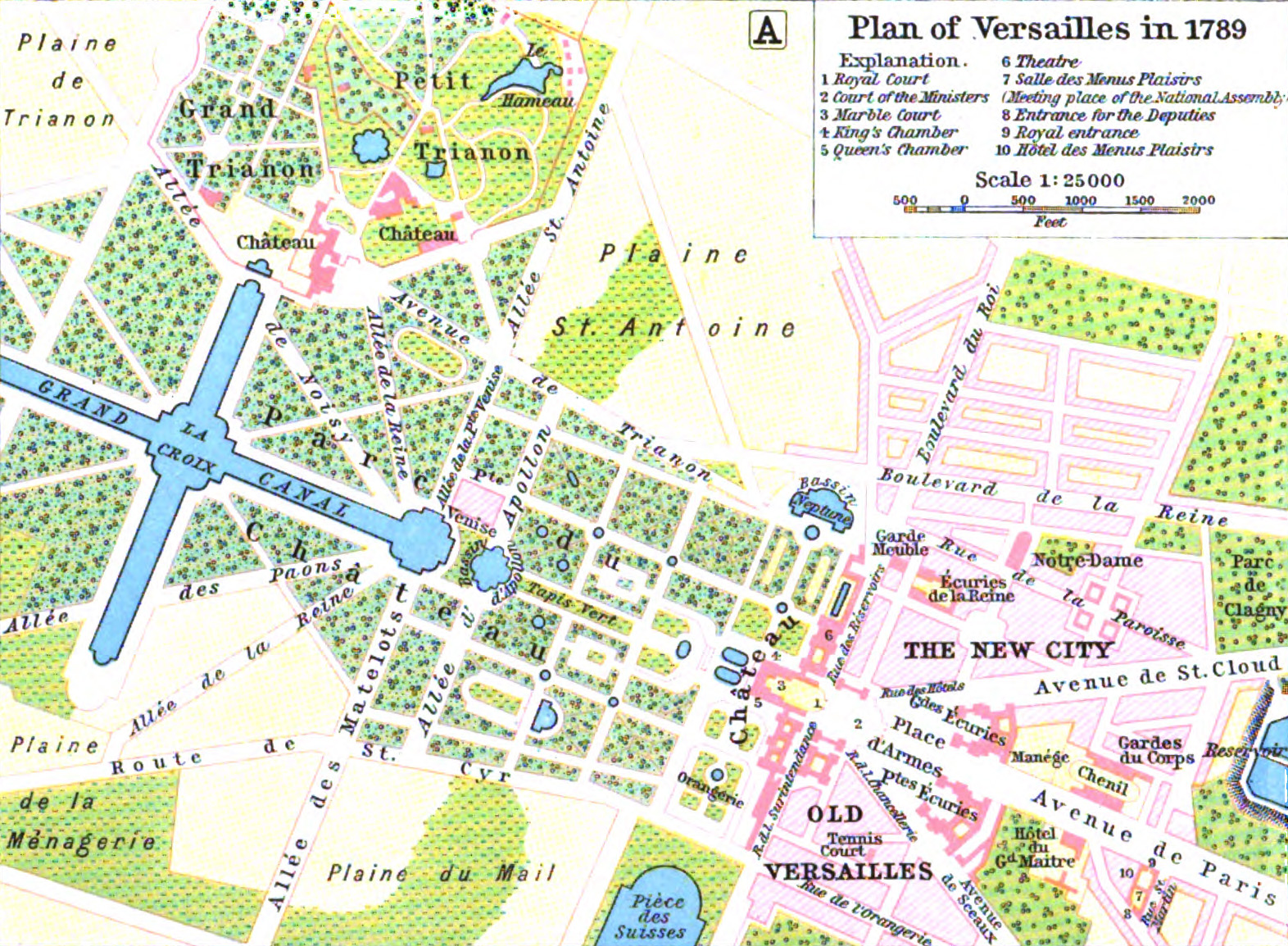
Map of Versailles in 1789

The crowd traveled the distance from Paris to Versailles in about six hours. Among their makeshift weaponry they dragged along several cannons taken from the Hôtel de Ville. Boisterous and energetic, they recruited (or impressed into service) more and more followers as they surged out of Paris in the autumn rain. In their poissard slang, (Note: Poissarde (plural poissardes), literally "fishwife", was a contemporary general term for women of the working class. Derived from the French poix (pitch, tar), it is synonymous with their highly stylized urban slang.) they chattered about bringing the king back home. They spoke less affectionately of the queen, Marie Antoinette, and many called for her death.

=== Occupation of the assembly ===
When the crowd reached Versailles, it was met by another group that had assembled from the surrounding area. Members of the assembly greeted the marchers and invited Maillard into their hall, where he fulminated about the Flanders Regiment and the people's need for bread. As he spoke, the restless Parisians came pouring into the Assembly and sank exhausted on the deputies' benches. Hungry, fatigued, and bedraggled from the rain, they seemed to confirm that the siege was a simple demand for food. The unprotected deputies had no choice but to receive the marchers, who shouted down most of the speakers and demanded to hear from the popular reformist deputy Mirabeau. The great orator declined this chance to speak but nonetheless mingled familiarly with the market women, even sitting for some time with one of them upon his knee. A few other deputies welcomed the marchers warmly, including Maximilien Robespierre who was at that time a relatively obscure political figure. Robespierre spoke strong words of support for the women and their plight; his intervention helped to soften the crowd's hostility towards the assembly.

=== Deputation to the king ===
With few other options available to him, the President of the Assembly, Jean Joseph Mounier, accompanied a deputation of market-women into the palace to see the king. A group of six women nominated by the crowd were escorted into the king's apartment, where they told him of the crowd's privations. The king responded sympathetically, and using all his charm impressed the women to the point that one of them fainted at his feet. After this brief but pleasant meeting, arrangements were made to disburse some food from the royal stores, with more promised, and some in the crowd felt that their goals had been satisfactorily met. As rain once again began to pelt Versailles, Maillard and a small cluster of market women trooped triumphantly back to Paris.

Most in the crowd, however, were not satisfied. They milled around the palace grounds with rumors abounding that the women's deputation had been duped – the queen would inevitably force the king to break any promises that had been made. Well aware of the mounting danger, Louis discussed the situation with his advisors. At about six o'clock in the evening, the king made a belated effort to quell the rising tide of insurrection: he announced that he would accept the August decrees and the Declaration of the Rights of Man without qualification. Adequate preparations to defend the palace were not made, however: the bulk of the royal guards, who had been deployed under arms in the main square for several hours facing a hostile crowd, were withdrawn to the far end of the park of Versailles. In the words of one of the officers: "Everyone was overwhelmed with sleep and lethargy, we thought it was all over." This left only the usual night guard of sixty-one Gardes du Corps posted throughout the palace.

Late in the evening, Lafayette's national guardsmen approached up the Avenue de Paris. Lafayette immediately left his troops and went to see the king, grandly announcing himself with the declaration, "I have come to die at the feet of Your Majesty". Outside, an uneasy night was spent in which his Parisian guardsmen mingled with the marchers, and the two groups sounded each other out. Many in the crowd denounced Lafayette as a traitor, complaining of his resistance to leaving Paris and the slowness of his march. By the first light of morning, it was clear that the national guards and the diverse civilian demonstrators from Paris and Versailles township had formed a vigorous alliance.

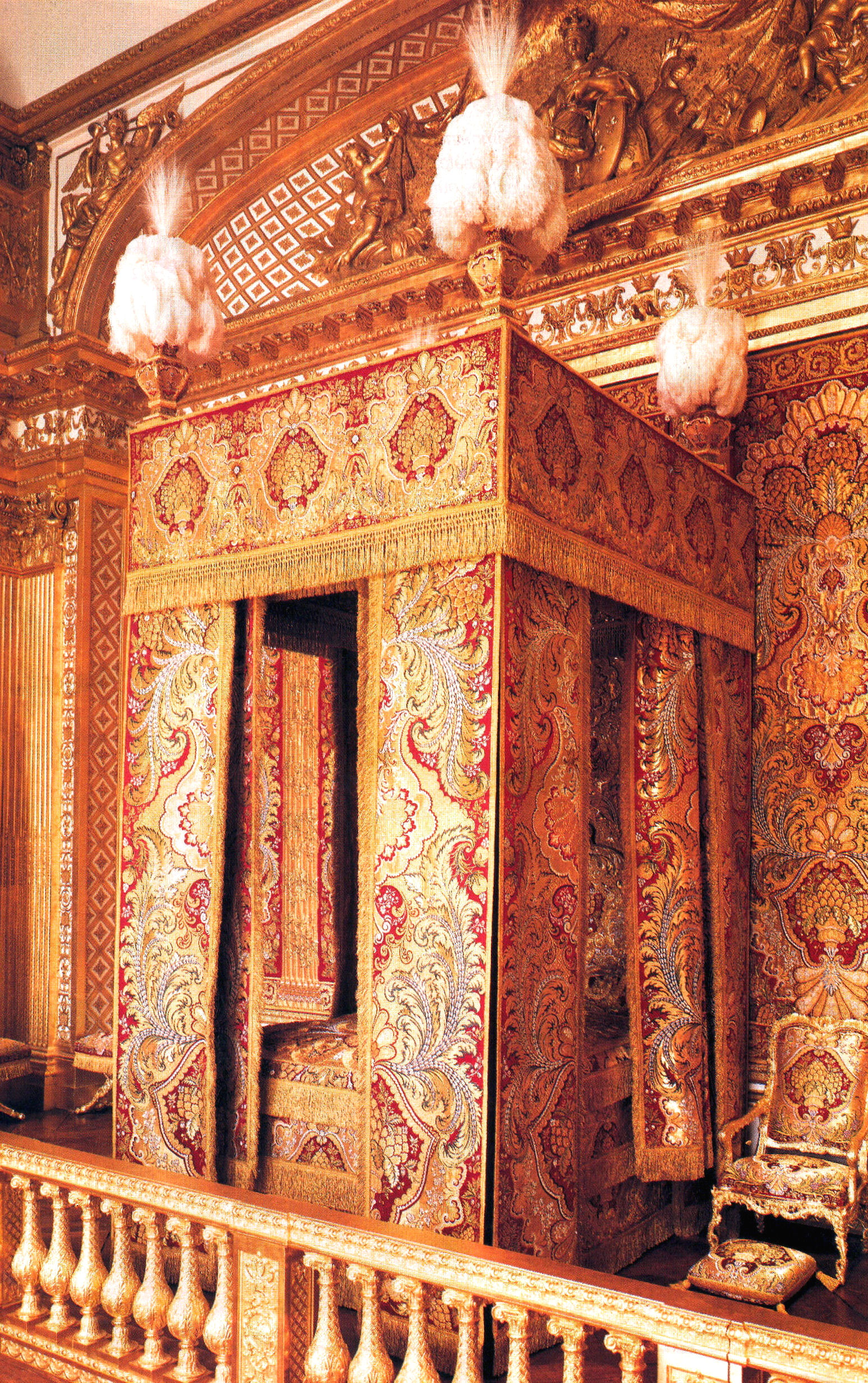
The king's bedchamber at the Palace of Versailles

=== Attack on the palace ===
At about six o'clock in the morning, some of the by now mostly male protesters discovered a small gate to the palace was unguarded. Making their way inside, they searched for the queen's bedchamber. The royal guards retreated through the palace, bolting doors and barricading hallways and those in the compromised sector, the cour de marbre, fired their guns at the intruders, killing a young member of the crowd. Infuriated, the rest surged towards the breach and streamed inside.

One of the gardes du corps on duty was killed immediately and his body decapitated. A second guardsman Tardivet du Repaire, posted outside the entrance to the Queen's apartments, attempted to face down the crowd and was struck down severely wounded. (Note: Miomandre was left for dead but survived to become a royalist hero. Schama's index gives his full name as François Aimé Miomandre de Sainte-Marie. Carlyle gives the second guard's name as Tardivet du Repaire.)

Marie-Élisabeth Thibault and Adélaïde Auguié were on duty in the queen's bedroom. When they heard the attack, they locked the doors and woke the queen. As battering and screaming filled the halls around her, the queen ran barefoot with her ladies to the king's bedchamber and spent several minutes banging on its locked door, unheard above the din. They escaped through the doorway safely and in time to avoid the crowd.

The chaos continued as other royal guards were found and beaten; at least one more was killed and his head too appeared atop a pike. Finally, the fury of the attack subsided enough to permit some communication between the former French Guards, who formed the professional core of Lafayette's National Guard militia, and the royal gardes du corps. The units had a history of cooperation and a military sense of mutual respect, and Lafayette, who had been sleeping, awoke and intervened. The two groups of soldiers were reconciled by Lafayette and a tenuous peace was established within the palace.

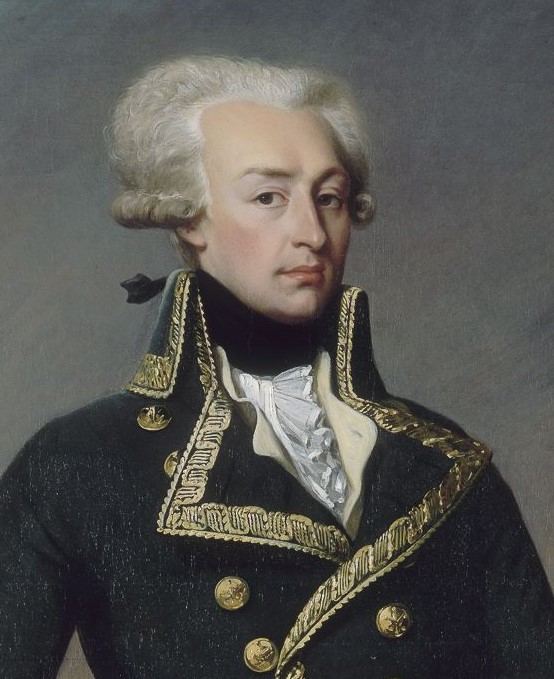
The Marquis de Lafayette (1757–1834)

=== Lafayette's intervention ===
Although the fighting ceased and the two commands of troops had cleared the interior of the palace, the mob was still present outside. The rank and file of both the Flanders Regiment and another regular unit present, the Montmorency Dragoons, now appeared unwilling to act against the people. While the guet (watch) of Gardes du Corps on palace duty overnight had shown courage in protecting the royal family, the main body of the regiment had abandoned their position near the Triannon and retreated to Rambouillet at dawn. Lafayette convinced the king to address the crowd. When the two men stepped out on a balcony an unexpected cry went up: "Vive le Roi!" (Long live the king!) The relieved king briefly conveyed his willingness to return to Paris, acceding "to the love of my good and faithful subjects". As the crowd cheered, Lafayette stoked their joy by dramatically pinning a tricolor cockade to the hat of the king's nearest bodyguard.

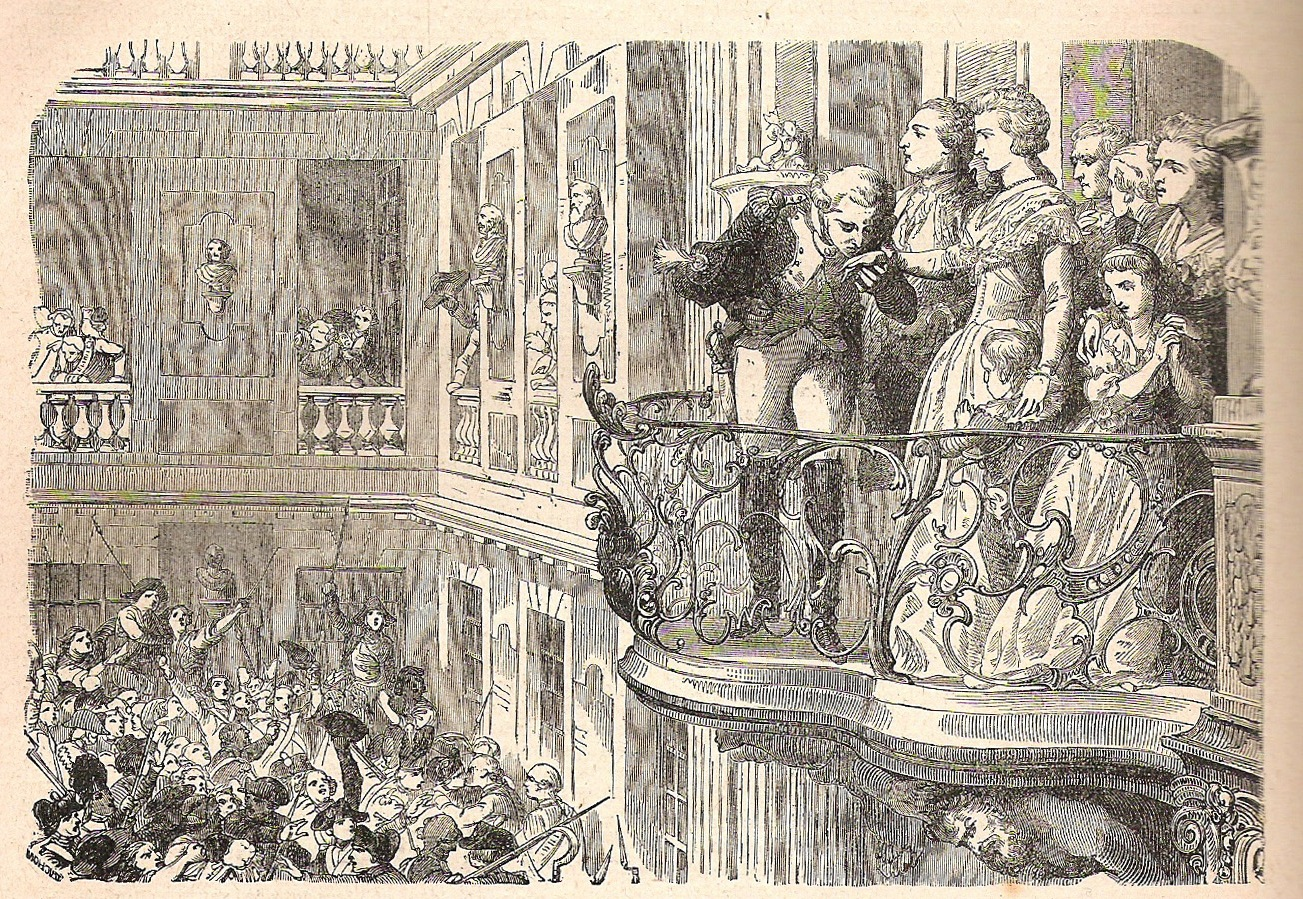
Lafayette at the balcony with Marie Antoinette

After the king withdrew, the presence of the Queen was demanded loudly. Lafayette brought her to the same balcony, accompanied by her young son and daughter. The crowd ominously shouted for the children to be taken away, and it seemed the stage might be set for a regicide. Yet, as the queen stood with her hands crossed over her chest, the crowd – some of whom had muskets leveled in her direction – warmed to her courage. Amid this unlikely development, Lafayette cannily let the mob's fury drain away until, with dramatic timing and flair, he knelt reverently and kissed her hand. The demonstrators responded with a muted respect, and many even raised a cheer which the queen had not heard for some time: "Vive la Reine!"

The goodwill generated by these displays defused the situation, but to many observers the scene on the balcony lacked long-term resonance. However pleased it may have been by the royal displays, the crowd insisted that the king return with them to Paris.

=== Return to Paris ===
At about one o'clock in the afternoon of 6 October 1789, the vast throng escorted the royal family and a complement of one hundred deputies back to the capital, with the armed National Guards leading the way. By now the mass of people had grown to over sixty thousand, and the return trip took about nine hours. The procession could seem merry at times, as guardsmen hoisted up loaves of bread stuck on the tips of their bayonets, and some of the market women rode gleefully astride the captured cannon. Yet, even as the crowd sang pleasantries about their "Good Papa", a violent undercurrent was clearly in evidence; celebratory gunshots flew over the royal carriage and some marchers carried pikes bearing the heads of the slaughtered Versailles guards. A sense of victory over the ancien régime animated the parade and the relationship between the King and his people would never be the same.

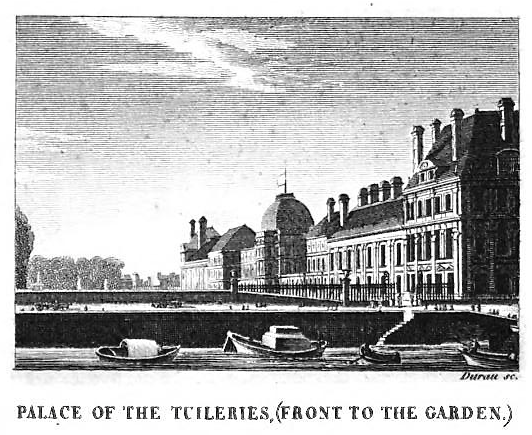
The Tuileries Palace, located deep in the city beside the Seine River, was a dark and uncomfortable residence for the royal family.

No one understood this so well as the king himself. After arriving at the dilapidated Tuileries Palace, abandoned since the reign of Louis XIV, he was asked for his orders and he replied with uncharacteristic diffidence, "Let everyone put himself where he pleases!". He then poignantly asked that a history of the deposed Charles I of England be brought from the library.

== Aftermath ==
The rest of the National Constituent Assembly followed the king within two weeks to new quarters in Paris. In short order, the entire body settled in only a few steps from the Tuileries at a former riding school, the Salle du Manège. However, some fifty-six monarchien deputies did not come with them, believing the mob in the capital to be dangerous. The October journées thus effectively deprived the monarchist faction of significant representation in the Assembly as most of these deputies retreated from the political scene; many, like Mounier, fled the country altogether.

In contrast, Robespierre's impassioned defense of the march raised his public profile considerably. The episode gave him a lasting heroic status among the poissardes and burnished his reputation as a patron of the poor. His later rise to become a leading figure in the Revolution was greatly facilitated by his actions during the occupation of the Assembly.

Lafayette, though initially acclaimed, found that he had tied himself too closely to the king. As the Revolution progressed, he was hounded into exile by the radical leadership. Maillard returned to Paris with his status as a local hero consolidated. He participated in several later journées, but in 1794 fell ill and died at the age of thirty-one. For the women of Paris, the march became the source of apotheosis in revolutionary hagiography. The "Mothers of the Nation" were celebrated upon their return, and they would be praised and solicited by successive Parisian governments for years to come.

King Louis XVI was officially welcomed to Paris with a respectful ceremony held by mayor Jean Sylvain Bailly. His return was touted as a momentous turning point in the Revolution, by some even as its end. Optimistic observers such as Camille Desmoulins declared that France would now enter a new golden age, with its revived citizenry and popular constitutional monarchy. Others were more wary, such as journalist Jean-Paul Marat, who wrote:

It is a source of great rejoicing for the good people of Paris to have their king in their midst once again. His presence will very quickly do much to change the outward appearance of things, and the poor will no longer die of starvation. But this happiness would soon vanish like a dream if we did not ensure that the sojourn of the Royal Family in our midst lasted until the Constitution was ratified in every aspect. L'Ami du Peuple shares the jubilation of its dear fellow citizens, but it will remain ever vigilant.

— L'Ami du Peuple #7 (1789)

It would take almost two full years until the first French Constitution was signed on 3 September 1791, and it required another popular intervention to make it happen. Louis attempted to work within the framework of his limited powers after the women's march but won little support, and he and the royal family remained virtual prisoners in the Tuileries. Desperate, he made his abortive flight to Varennes in June 1791. Attempting to escape and join up with royalist armies, the king was once again captured by a mixture of citizens and national guardsmen who hauled him back to Paris. Permanently disgraced, Louis was forced to accept a constitution that weakened his royal power more than any previously put forward. The spiral of decline in the king's fortunes culminated at the guillotine in 1793.

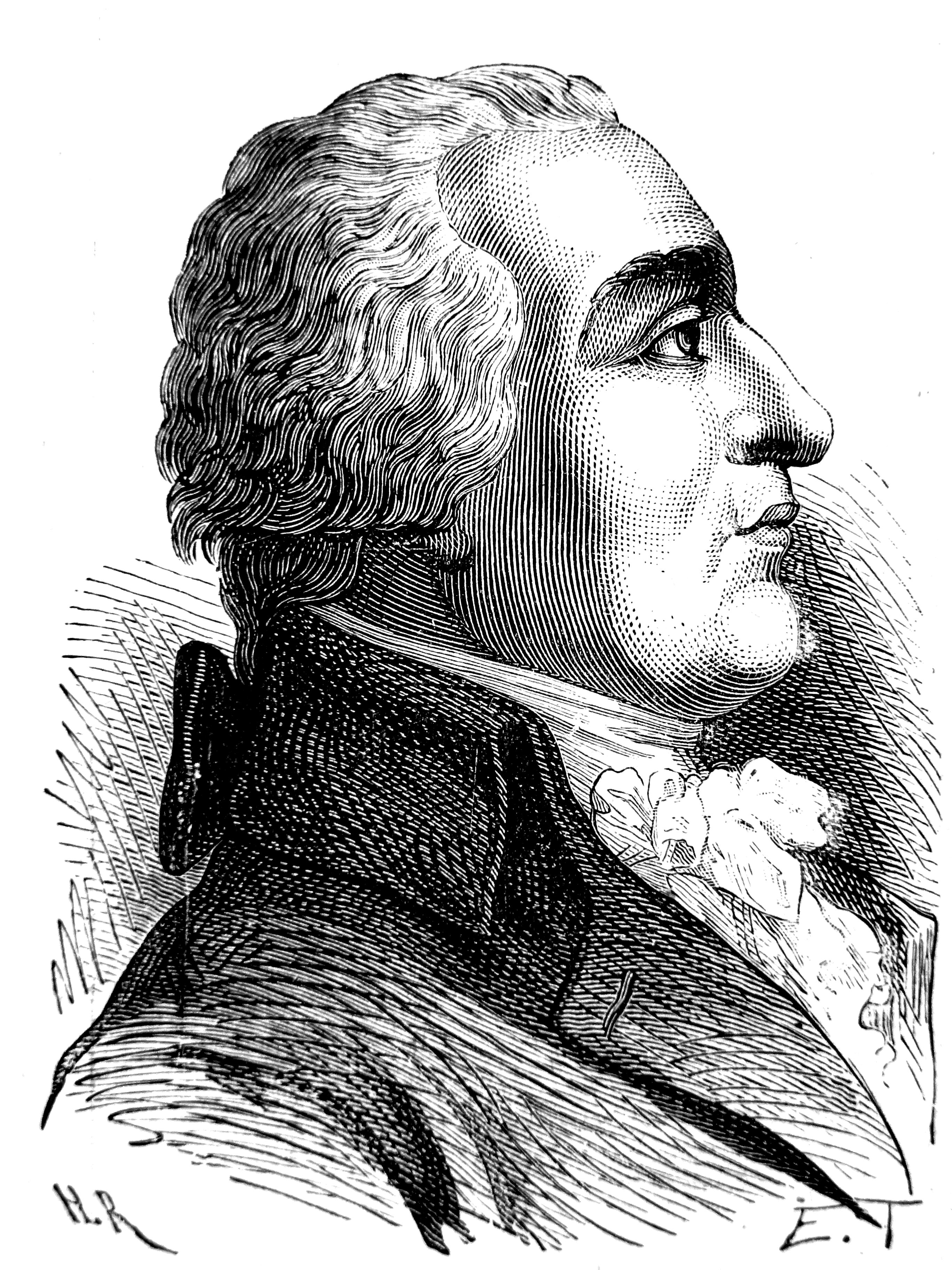
Louis Philippe II, Duke of Orléans, (1747–1793)

=== Orléanist conspiracy theory ===
Even while the women were marching, suspicious eyes looked upon Louis Philippe II, Duke of Orléans, already behind the July uprisings, as being somehow responsible for the event. The Duke, a cousin of Louis XVI, was an energetic proponent of constitutional monarchy, and it was an open secret that he felt himself to be uniquely qualified to be king under such a system. Though allegations of his specific actions concerning the October march remain largely unproven, he has long been considered a significant instigator of the events. The Duke was certainly present as a deputy to the Assembly, and he was described by contemporaries as smiling warmly as he walked among the protesters at the height of the siege; many of them are said to have hailed him with greetings like "Here is our king! Long live King Orléans!" Many scholars believe that the Duke paid agents provocateurs to fan the discontent in the marketplaces and to conflate the women's march for bread with the drive to bring the king back to Paris. Others suggest he coordinated in some way with Mirabeau, the Assembly's most powerful statesman at the time, to use the marchers to advance the constitutionalist agenda. Still others go so far as to assert that the crowd was guided by such important Orléanist allies as Antoine Barnave, Choderlos de Laclos, and the duc d'Aiguillon, all dressed as poissardes in women's clothes. Yet most of the Revolution's foremost histories describe any involvement of the Duke as ancillary to the action, efforts of opportunism that neither created nor defined the October march. (Note: Some writers, such as Hibbert and Webster, impute significant influence to the Duke; most authoritative historians of the Revolution give him much less emphasis. Lefebvre and Soboul describe Orléanist activity as garden-variety political manœuvres that would have been ineffective without the compelling economic circumstances that motivated the commoners. Carlyle, Michelet, and Rose paint his influence as shadowy and malign, but without resonant success. Schama and Doyle, by their absence of focus, depict him as largely irrelevant to the situation.) The Duke was investigated by the crown for complicity and none was proven. Still, the pall of suspicion helped convince him to take on Louis XVI's offer of a diplomatic mission conveniently outside the country. He returned to France the following summer and resumed his place in the Assembly where both he and Mirabeau were officially exonerated of any misdeeds regarding the march. As the Revolution moved forward into the Terror, the Duke's royal lineage and alleged avarice convicted him in the minds of radical leaders and he was sent to his execution in November 1793.

== Legacy ==
The women's march was a signal event of the French Revolution, with an effect on par with the fall of the Bastille. For posterity, the march is emblematic of the power of popular movements. The occupation of the deputies' benches in the Assembly created a template for the future, ushering in the mob rule that would frequently influence successive Parisian governments. But it was the crudely decisive invasion of the palace itself that was most momentous; the attack removed forever the aura of invincibility that once cloaked the monarchy. It marked the end of the king's resistance to the tide of reform; he made no further open attempts to push back the Revolution. As one historian states, it was "one of those defeats of royalty from which it never recovered". The marathon course used at the 2024 Summer Olympics is based on a similar route taken by the women's march.

== See also ==
- Food riots
- List of food riots
- List of uprisings led by women
- Reine Audu
- Theroigne de Mericourt

== Bibliography ==
- Carlyle, Thomas (1838) [1837]. The French Revolution: A History. Boston, MA: Little & Brown. OCLC 559080788.
- Cobb, Richard; Jones, Colin (1988). The French Revolution: Voices From a Momentous Epoch, 1789–1795. Simon & Schuster. ISBN 0671699253.
- Dawson, Philip (1967). The French Revolution. New Jersey: Prentice-Hall. OCLC 405698.
- Doyle, William (1990). The Oxford History of the French Revolution (3 ed.). Oxford, UK: Oxford University Press. ISBN 0-19-285221-3.
- Furet, François; Ozouf, Mona (1989). Dictionnaire critique de la révolution française. Cambridge, MA: Harvard University Press. ISBN 0-674-17728-2.
- Gershoy, Leo (1933). The French Revolution and Napoleon. New York: F.S. Crofts & Co. OCLC 692300210.
- Godechot, Jacques (1970). The Taking of the Bastille, July 14th, 1789. London: Faber and Faber Ltd.
- Gruyer, Paul (1922). A Week at Versailles: The Town, the Palace, the Park, the Trianon Palaces. Paris: Librairie Hachette. p. 71.
- Hibbert, Christopher (1980). The Days of the French Revolution. New York: William Morrow and Co. ISBN 0-688-03704-6.
- Hunt, Lynn Avery (1995). The Challenge of the West: Peoples and Cultures from 1560 to the Global Age. D.C. Heath. ISBN 978-0669121643.
- Kropotkin, Peter (1909). The Great French Revolution 1789–1793. G.P. Putnam & Sons. ISBN 1-4179-0734-7.
- Lefebvre, Georges (1962). The French Revolution: From its Origins to 1793. New York: Columbia University Press. ISBN 0-7100-7181-7. OCLC 220957452.
- Mansel, Philip (1984). Pillars of Monarchy. Quartet Books. ISBN 0-7043-2424-5.
- Morris, Gouverneur (1939). A Diary of the French Revolution, Volume 1. Ayer Publishing. ISBN 0-8369-5809-8.
- Rose, John Holland (1913). The Revolutionary and Napoleonic Era, 1789–1815 (Sixth ed.). New York: G.P. Putnam's Sons. OCLC 461169081.
- Schama, Simon (1989). Citizens: A Chronicle of the French Revolution. Vintage Books/Random House. ISBN 0-679-72610-1.
- Scurr, Ruth (2006). Fatal Purity: Robespierre and the French Revolution. London: Vintage Books. pp. 93–94. ISBN 978-0-09-945898-2.
- Soboul, Albert (1975). The French Revolution 1787–1799. New York: Vintage. p. 155. ISBN 0-394-71220-X.
- Sorel, Alexandre (1862). Stanislas Maillard, l'homme du 2 septembre 1792 (in French). Paris: A. Aubry.
- Stephens, Henry Morse (1891). A History of the French Revolution, Volume 2. New York: Charles Scribner's Sons. OCLC 427855469.
- Webster, Nesta H. (1919). The French Revolution: A Study in Democracy. New York: E.P. Dutton & Co. OCLC 1533887.
- Wright, Gordon (1960). France in Modern Times, 1760 to the present. Chicago: Rand McNally. OCLC 402013.
