= Reine Audu =

French market woman and revolutionary (active 1789–1795)

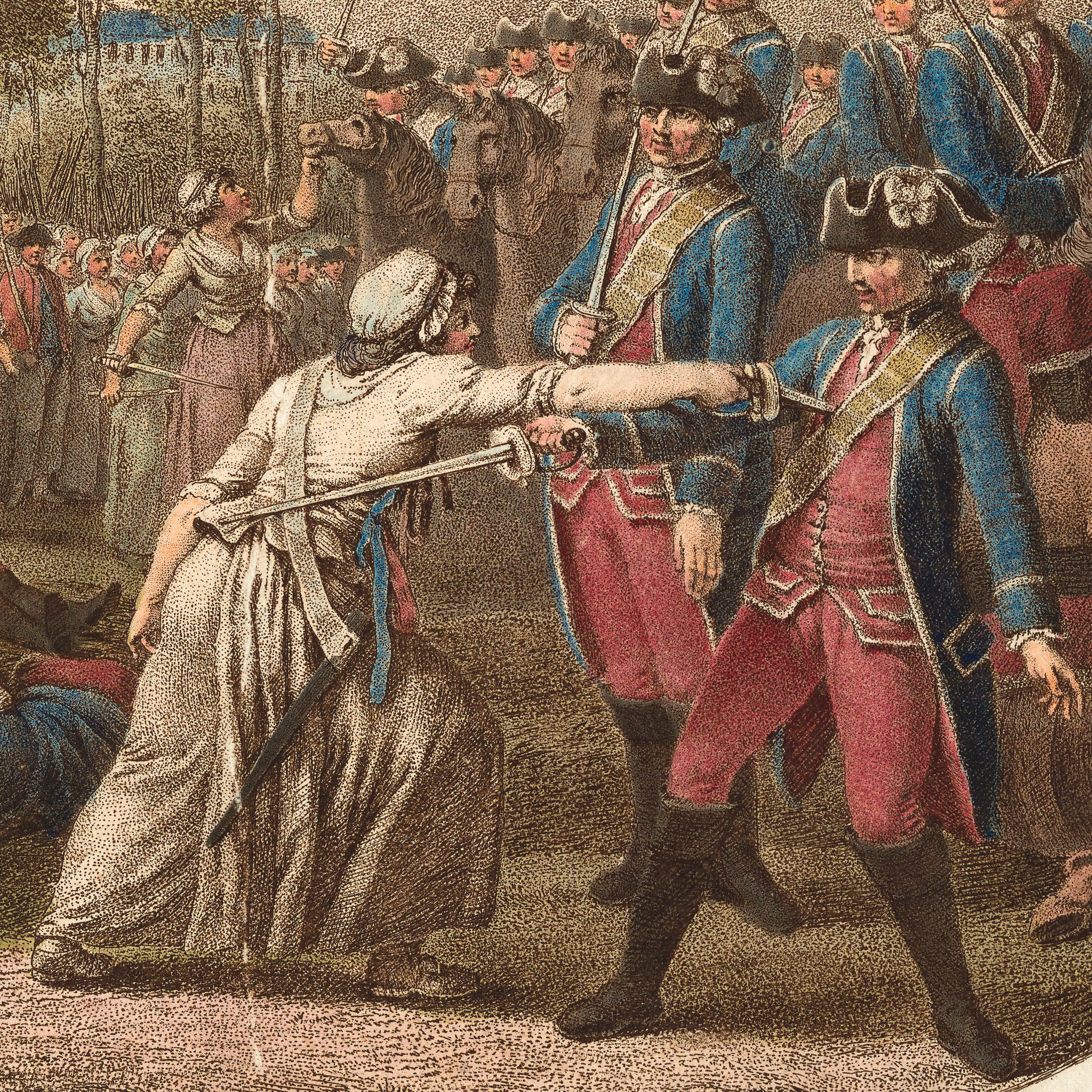
- Audu at the march on Versailles (c. 1789) by Jacques-Philippe Caresme
- Other name: Louise Renée Leduc
- Occupations: Fruit seller; market woman
- Years active: fl. 1789–1795 (Note: Reine Audu's birth date is unknown. Her political activity started in 1789. In his biography of Audu, Marc de Villiers du Terrage writes: "Nous la retrouverons en thermidor an III prisonnière à Sainte-Pélagie" (transl. "We find her again in Thermidor, Year III [July–August 1795], a prisoner at Sainte-Pélagie"). Winifred Stephens Whale asserts that Audu's fate and cause of death are not known.)

Reine Audu, also called Louise Renée Leduc (fl. 1789–1795), was a French fruit seller and revolutionary. In October 1789, she incited the crowds of hungry citizens in the Paris marketplace to march to Versailles and confront King Louis XVI about the lack of food in the city. She was part of the delegation that pressed the people's demands directly to the king, and she escorted the royal court back to Paris.

In August 1792, Audu stormed the Tuileries Palace with armed revolutionaries and was shot in the thigh. She was awarded a civil crown by the fédérés after the battle. Despite the role she played in important events of the French Revolution, Audu and other market women were eventually sidelined by the Jacobins and banned from attending political assemblies. After 1795, her fate is unknown.

== Early life ==
Little is known of Reine Audu's origins. "Louise" or "Renée" may have been her given names, and "Leduc" may have been her family name. She was a fruit seller and market woman in Paris in the early days of the French Revolution in 1789. As was tradition at the time, she was elected la Reine des Halles (transl. "Queen of the Markets"), because she was beautiful. This title may be the origin of her nickname "Reine".

== March on Versailles ==
Audu's notable political activities began in 1789. As affordable food grew increasingly scarce in Paris, Audu collaborated with revolutionaries like Stanislas-Marie Maillard to incite the crowds. She shouted in the streets and demanded that King Louis XVI and Queen Consort Marie Antoinette answer for the lack of bread.

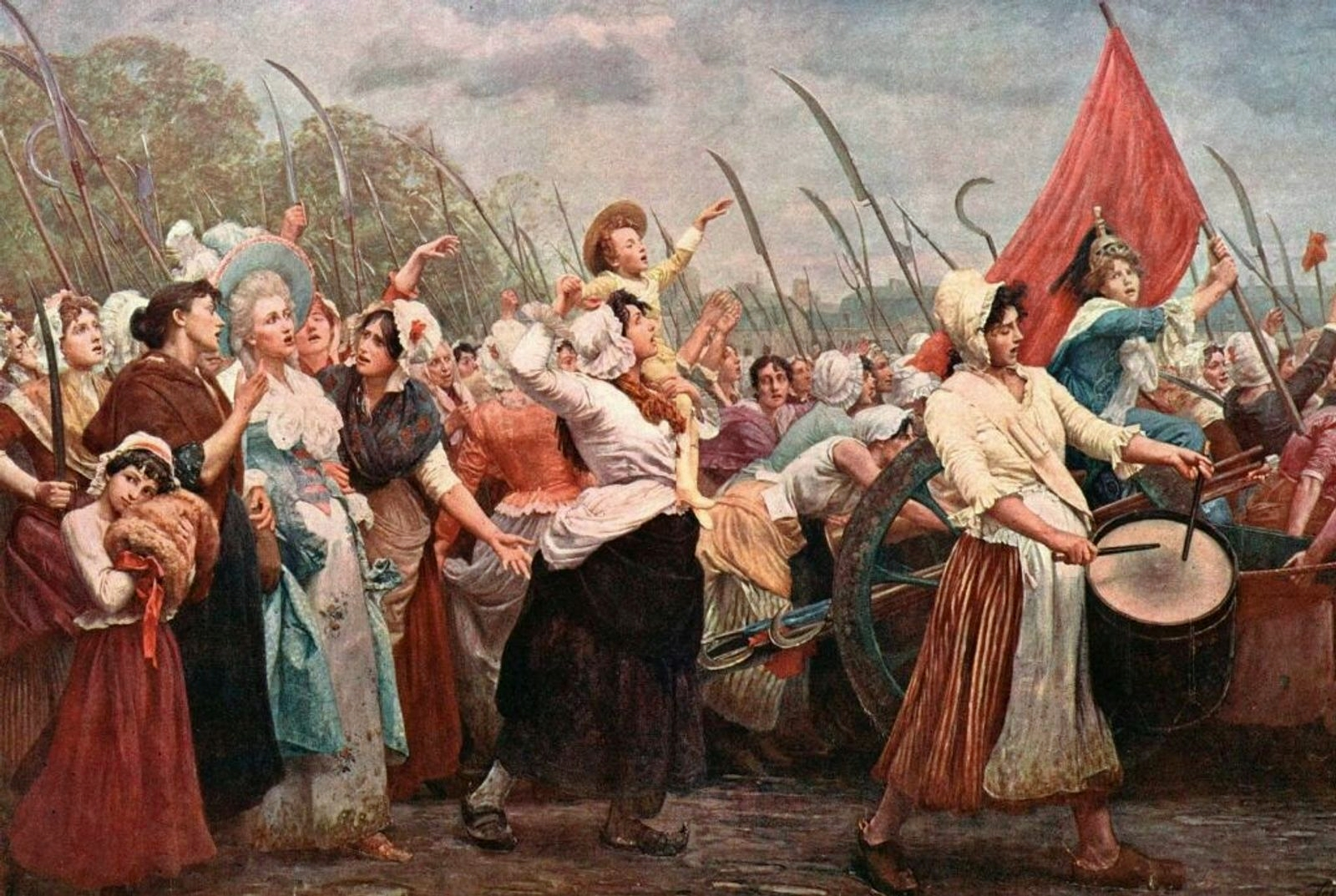
To Versailles, an Incident in the French Revolution by Valentine Cameron Prinsep (1838–1904)

On 5 October 1789, large crowds of women gathered in the Parisian marketplace, demanding bread; they converged and marched to Versailles with Audu among them. Along the way, men joined the marchers. Once at Versailles, the crowds invaded the palace grounds, forcing the Marquis de Lafayette to intercede on behalf of the royals. Louis XVI attempted to appease the crowds with a speech on the balcony, but ultimately he was compelled to hear the demands of the people directly from a delegation, which included Audu. Emboldened, the marchers pressured the king and his royal court to return to Paris with them; Audu was among the crowd that triumphantly escorted the court back. The king was then forced to rule from the Tuileries Palace, marking the end of the "great monarchy of Versailles" that had persisted since the reign of Louis XIV.

Audu was the only person arrested by the La Châtelet Law Court for her involvement in the march on Versailles. She was charged with participating in "disorderly scenes", helping to kill the king's bodyguards, and "announcing her intention... of bringing back the Queen's head on her sword." She denied all involvement at first, and then she claimed that a group of poorly-dressed women handed her a broomstick and forced her to march with them. In Women of the French Revolution, Winifred Stephens Whale writes that Audu's lawyer, Chenau, recognized that Audu was going to be convicted anyway, so he decided to depict her as a patriotic heroine and "a second Joan of Arc." In Chenau's legendized portrayal of her exploits at Versailles, Audu organized the march herself, tackled the commander of the National Guard, was "wounded in her breast and right arm", charmed the king, and rode back to Paris on a cannon.

Audu was ultimately convicted. Many people sent petitions demanding her release, and the Châtelet freed her in September 1791, after she had spent eleven months in prison. As a reward for her heroism during the march on Versailles, the Jacobin Club gave Audu a total of 356 francs and 5 sous, but she did not believe this amount was enough. Her requests for a lifetime pension were ignored.

== Assault on the Tuileries Palace ==
Tensions between revolutionary and royalist factions culminated in the "insurrectionary Commune", leading the people to revolt on 10 August 1792 and storm the Tuileries Palace. The Swiss Guards at the palace fired at the crowds, killing four hundred people. News of the killings quickly spread, and, in response, Parisians converged on the palace "from all sides" and overwhelmed the guards.

Audu was shot in the thigh during the battle. In Dictionnaire des personnages de la Révolution, Caratini writes that she "battre comme les hommes" (transl. "fought like a man") and that she may have killed several Swiss soldiers. Audu is one of three women, including Theroigne de Mericourt and Claire Lacombe, who received a civic crown from the fédérés for their actions on 10 August. She also petitioned the Jacobins for employment and was assigned to guard a flour storehouse.

== Decline and death ==
At first, market women like Audu and Claire Lacombe were honored and encouraged by Jean-Paul Marat, who recognized them as "an important part of the street history of Paris." However, after 1792, the Jacobins began to distance themselves from women revolutionaries like Audu. By May 1793, market women were banned from the galleries of the National Convention and then subsequently banned from all political assemblies. The women tried to appeal this decision, but politician Pierre Gaspard Chaumette (Note: Chaumette believed that women's political participation was against the "laws of nature".) told them: "the Republic has no need for Joans of Arc."

Audu's biographer, Winifred Stephens Whale, writes that she was imprisoned at Sainte-Pélagie Prison for unknown reasons on 17 July 1794 and released by September of that same year. Another biographer, Marc de Villiers du Terrage, places her imprisonment at Sainte-Pélagie in Thermidor, Year III (July–August 1795), speculating that she was involved in the Prairial revolt. Ultimately, her fate is uncertain, and she is rumored to have died after her mental health deteriorated.

== Legacy ==
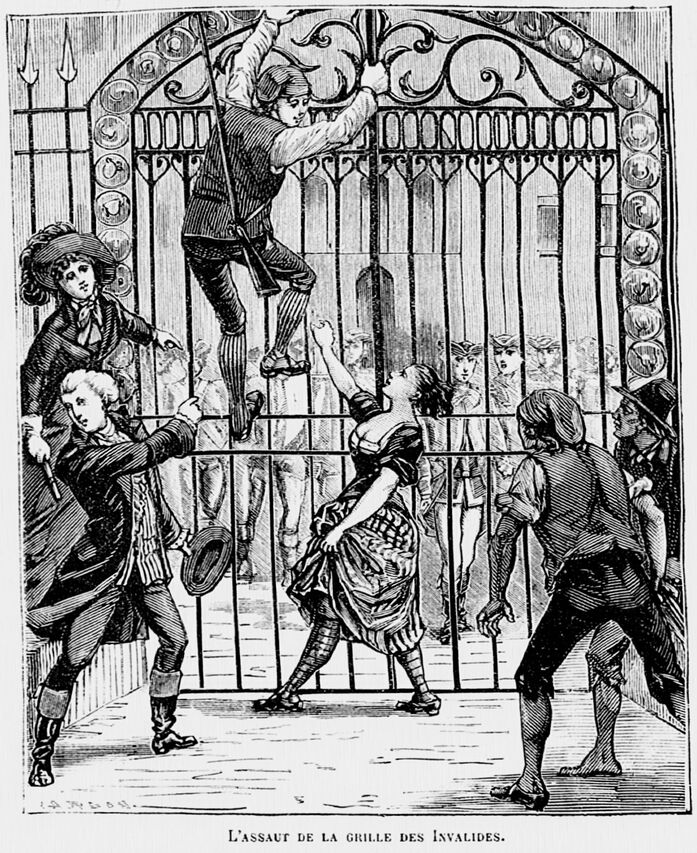
Reine Audu (center) and Theroigne de Mericourt (left) depicted at Les Invalides in a work of fiction: Marat, ou Les héros de la Révolution (1883)

In 2018, Audu was portrayed by Céline Sallette in the film Un peuple et son roi. She was also a character in Révolution, a 2019 comic book series about the French Revolution by Florent Grouazel and Younn Locard. Their work on Révolution earned both Grouazel and Locard the Cheverny Prize for historic comics in 2020. In 2025, Audu was featured in the animated French documentary series Aux armes, citoyennes! (transl. To arms, citizens!) about women in the French Revolution whose contributions were previously ignored by historians. The documentary describes how revolutionary women like Audu endured the "double violence" of "combat politique et ... leur effacement" (transl. "political struggle and ... their own erasure").
