= Flour War =

Wave of riots in France (April–May 1775)

The Flour War (French: Guerre des farines) refers to a wave of riots from April to May 1775, in the northern, eastern, and western parts of the Kingdom of France. It followed an increase in grain prices, and subsequently bread prices; bread was an important source of food among the populace. Contributing factors to the riots include poor weather and harvests, and the withholding by police of public grain supplies from the royal stores in 1773–1774. This large-scale revolt subsided following wheat price controls imposed by Turgot, Louis XVI's Controller-General of Finances (before the supply recovered), and the deploying of military troops.

The Flour War was part of a broader social and political crisis during the Ancien Régime. Recent analyses tend to treat this event not only as a revolt caused by hunger, but also as a prelude to the French Revolution.

== Causes ==
In Ancien Régime France, bread was the main source of food for poor peasants and the king was required to ensure the food supply of his subjects, being affectionately nicknamed "the first baker of the kingdom". Food scarcity and famine were everpresent concerns until the modern agricultural revolution, and 18th century France was no exception. During this period, the role of the royal police involved far more than simply upholding the law. Police held responsibility over many systems in society, even street sweeping; they also exercised a strict control over the food supply. In order to maintain social order, the grain market was subject to harsh rules to ensure the quality of the bread and its availability at all times and for the entire population. Grain merchants were viewed with suspicion; they were called "the most cruel enemies of the people" as they were suspected of mixing flour with other products (such as chalk or crushed bones) or of hoarding grain to artificially raise the price of this vital commodity. The Ancien Régime favoured a "moral economy" where cupidity was moderated by strict regulations. The police controlled the purity of the flour and made sure that no one would hide grain to drive up prices. To alleviate hoarding, the grain police would forbid exports from regions facing bad harvests and would import grain from regions enjoying overproduction. It could also force a merchant to drop the price of his flour (he was later compensated for his loss in times of abundance).

During the Age of Enlightenment, the physiocratic school of economy emerged. The physiocrats, or économistes as they called themselves, had a great impact on Turgot, who was to become Controller-General of Finances preceding the riots. Their opinion on what government economic policy should be was summarized in the term Vincent de Gournay laid claim to "leave it alone and let it pass" (laissez faire, laissez passer), also known as the "invisible hand" notion. Turgot passionately defended Gournay's belief in laissez-faire economic principles in his writing Éloge de Gournay. Accordingly, Turgot abolished police regulations and established free trade in grain on 13 September 1774.

During the period before the spring harvest of 1775, the cereal reserves were exhausted while new crops had not yet arrived. In spring 1775, famine arose: before Turgot's edict, every region faced its own shortages, so that some would have suffered a genuine famine while others would have been totally spared and supplied through state-ensured stable prices; a royal intervention would have been requested, and without a doubt obtained, to assure the supply of the regions most affected, thus mitigating the most severe effects of the famine. However, with liberalization, owners of grain started to speculate by storing grain. In attempt to corner the market, they also tended to buy en masse in areas of good harvests to sell in areas of bad harvests where profits could be greater, spreading price increases and shortages countrywide (less grain in good-harvest regions led to higher prices there as well) as opposed to being confined to local food disruptions. Consequently, the food shortages of early 1775 affected more people more quickly, and the king was faced with a national crisis as opposed to several small local disturbances. This conflict was known as the "Flour War of 1775". Reports from those that controlled the flow of grain stated there were problems with the grain harvest, causing shortages and less grain availability. News of a grain shortage was met with skepticism and frustration rose from higher prices, which many were unable to afford. Those in opposition of the reform rioted, and seized grain that came in on shipments. They offered what they felt was the "just price" for it. This demonstrated a way in which the people took some power back into their own hands. This practice was known as popular taxation (taxation populaire).

While there were documented efforts to deal with the grain shortage problems, such as increasing shipments from foreign countries, beliefs that the famine was intentionally orchestrated by Louis XVI, through the Pacte de Famine emerged. Turgot repressed the riots and restored controls over the grain market. The idea of free trade of grain was discredited and the economic experiment distanced the masses from the government in Versailles. The Flour War can be seen as a prelude to the French Revolution.

These events can be interpreted as a reaction against the edict from Turgot, which liberalized grain commerce on September 13, 1774; indeed, this liberalization appeared contrary to a "moral economy", as some people were hoarding flour in order to drive up prices. This shortage of flour broke the principle that required the king to ensure the security of his subjects and their food supply. The Flour War was in line with previous wheat fluctuations, and ushered in the wheat riots of Year II.

== Events ==
=== Wheat riots ===
==== Causes and stages of violence related to wheat production ====
During the period before the spring harvest of 1775, the cereal reserves were exhausted while the new harvest had not yet arrived. In spring 1775, famine arose in this new context: before Turgot's edict, every region faced its own shortages, so that some would have suffered a genuine famine while others would have been totally spared and supplied through stable prices; a royal intervention would have been requested, and without a doubt obtained, to assure the supply of the regions most affected. With liberalization, grains could leave spared regions to go the worst affected areas, causing significant price increases and shortages all over affecting more people more quickly.

The price of grain and of bread rose suddenly and became a desperate burden on the poorest populations. There ensued major popular unrest at markets and other flour distribution locations. Rumors spread against the "power-grabbers" and "monopolizers". This type of popular reaction against the merchants was a constant in times of famine, but it took on an unusual depth.

For a long time, the theory of a political plot woven against Turgot by various coteries of the Court has been advanced as an explanatory factor, a thesis historian George Rudé has dashed.

==== Main stages of an Ancien Régime riot, from obstruction to looting ====
Over 17 days, 180 conflicts would be listed from the Paris Basin; Jean Nicolas notes 123 distinct riots. Cynthia Bouton turns up 313 occurrences, sometimes interpreted as "anarchic movements", sometimes as the anticipation of rural revolts. These demonstrations of the moral economy took three distinct forms:

- in exporting regions, one notices spontaneous working-class taxation, and more or less organized looting. The rioters denounce speculation, forcing large farmers and land-owners to sell their stocks on the market at a "fair price", eventually looting bakeries and warehouses, while claiming to restore the principles of economic morality.
- in the cities, warehouse and bakery attacks are organized in a similar fashion.
- finally, erect obstacles to channels of communication, on rivers and roads, in areas of large cultivation. More by basic survival instinct than by malicious intent, the rioters hinder transport of a particular agricultural province's wheat to other provinces with higher purchasing power.

Victims were usually merchants or farmers, but more common, as shown by Cynthia Bouton, they were the direct representatives of power. The riots were often directed against the profiteer millers or against counselors of parliament, as they were that day, April 18, in Dijon. On April 27, the movement hit the great cultivated plains, initially West Burgundy then, gradually, Beauvaisis and finally Beauce and Brie. The rebels were in front of Versailles on May 2 and 3; the mob plundered the bakeries of Paris. Louis XVI appeared anxious, because some slogans and lampoons implicated his court. The destruction was in reality very limited; the main targets were the boats carrying the wheat, which were sunk.

==== Return to order ====
Order was reestablished by a pair of government actions:

- Repression, by the intervention of 25,000 soldiers, 162 arrests, and the hanging of two rioters (a 28-year-old wigmaker and his 16-year-old companion who were executed as examples in Place de Grève).
- Assistance to the population by the organization of food supplies to provinces in need as well as obligations placed on supply owners to sell their product at a fixed price. The king sent an increased number of messages to the peasant masses, in particular through the preaching of the clergy.

Five months were needed to put a definitive end to the trouble, but most of the problems were over by May 11, 1775.

=== Political and social critique ===
- The fear of famine became an ever-present dread for the lower strata of the Third Estate, and rumors of the "Pacte de Famine" to starve the poor were still rampant and readily believed. Mere rumors of food shortage led to the Réveillon riots in April 1789. Rumors of a plot aiming to destroy wheat crops in order to starve the population provoked the Great Fear in the summer of 1789. The hunger and despair of the Parisian women was also the original impetus for the Women's March on Versailles in October 1789. They wanted not just one meal but the assurance that bread would once again be plentiful and cheap.
- In the realm of politics, the outcome provoked fundamental modifications to the government and a change in royal policies. Turgot called for and obtains, on behalf of Louis XVI, the resignation of the Lieutenant General of Police, Jean-Charles-Pierre Lenoir.
- A few libelous statements, very localized in origin, blamed the king himself: one would find attacks against "the Bourbon blood", but these writings were the doing of a cultivated population and of learned pens. For Kaplan, the event marked the growing disenchantment of the people toward the king, a step toward the rupture of the sacred bond between the king and his subjects.
- However, the rioters showed a paradoxical nature, evincing the characteristics of economic morality brought to light by the historians E.P. Thompson and Charles Tilly: on the one hand, a request to return to royal paternalism, and at the same time, a critique of governmental policy. Two opposing logics: one that obeys the laws of property, and one that obeys morality. The rioters challenged public authority and requested the restoration of fair pricing. Lacking a response, set up a practice of rules of internal order: regulatory power.
- Finally, these rioters were a sign of a desire for food justice and redistribution, based upon a strong demand for regulation and supervision. The bread rioters could further be compared to jacqueries, in the sense where they were not trained against political authority, they were not doing it to usurp power, but they were obeying a communal discipline. Grain access and fair pricing of bread emerged as universal rights.
- On the social level, sources witnessed an increase in social tensions and social polarization: a small group of elite rich farmers were opposed to the masses of increasingly poor farmers. The peasants, described by certain sources as insurgents, were accompanied by village officials (who were sometimes forced) and by parish priests, like in Normandy.

The rioters' targets were therefore those individuals who were free of communal discipline: farmers and owners of large farms in the Paris Basin; to a lesser extent, the bourgeoisie of the cities; occasionally, noble landholders or clerics and farmers who had status in the feudal system, such as Jacques-Pierre de Hericourt, farmer of Cagny, in Brie, lord of Chesany.

- The issues around wheat and the social issues demonstrated the structural weakness of the kingdom's economy, but they also heralded the emergence of a new anti-establishment rhetoric.

== In culture ==
Jean-François Parot's historical novel Le sang des farines (Eng. title: The Baker's Blood) centers upon the events in Paris during the Flour War.

== Sources ==
- Manuscrits du lieutenant de police Lenoir (1732–1785)

== See also ==
- List of food riots
