= Samuel Pepys Club =

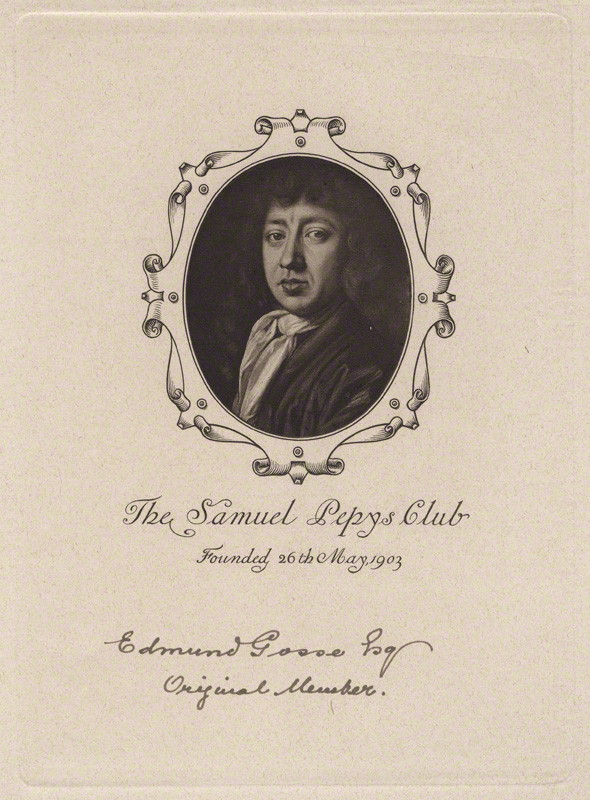
Diploma of membership of the Samuel Pepys Club for Sir Edmund Gosse. Aquatint photogravure (1905) after an oil painting by John Hayls (1666). CC The National Portrait Gallery, London.

The Samuel Pepys Club is a London club founded in 1903 to do honour to the memory of Samuel Pepys (1633–1703), the English naval administrator and Member of Parliament now best known as a diarist.

== Origin ==
On 26 May 1903, at the Garrick Club in London, a group of four men interested at various degrees in Samuel Pepys met together over dinner to celebrate the exact bicentenary of the death of the diarist. They were:

- Sir Frederick Bridge, organist of Westminster Abbey and author of Samuel Pepys, Lover of Musique published the same year;
- Sir D'Arcy Power, surgeon and medical writer, author of The Medical History of Mr and Mrs Samuel Pepys published in 1895 in The Lancet;
- George Whale, solicitor and bibliophile;
- Henry B. Wheatley, indexer and editor of the third edition of the Diary published between 1894 and 1899.

They resolved to found a club to honour the memory of Pepys, "to dine annually and to hold meetings at which they would hear readings from the Diary, listen to music of his era, and give and listen to papers on various aspects of his life". The response of admirers of Pepys was enthusiastic, and the first dinner was held on 1 December 1903 at Clothworkers' Hall, in memory of Pepys's Mastership (1677–8). They listened to music arranged by Sir Frederick Bridge, consisting of songs and of instrumental music on the flageolet, recorder, and trumpet marine. One of the quotations read from the Diary was thoroughly appropriate to this opening meeting of the Club: "To Clothworkers' Hall to dinner. Our entertainment very good, a brave hall, good company, and very good music." (Diary, 28 June 1660).

== Evolution and activities ==
The first president was Henry B. Wheatley, assisted by his brother Benjamin R. Wheatley acting as secretary, and by Sir D'Arcy Power as treasurer.

In 1953, fifty years after its foundation, the Club established an executive committee charged with the general conduct of the affairs. It includes four officers, eight elected members, and four ex-officio members. Since 1985, the president of the Club has been John Montagu, 11th Earl of Sandwich.

The Club has no fixed club house nor building. Its meetings and dinners are held in diverse venues in and around London.

Besides the annual dinner usually held in October in one of the many livery halls of London, St Olave Hart Street, in co-ordination with the Samuel Pepys Club, holds a Pepys Commemoration Service each year in May, as close as possible to the anniversary of his death on 26 May. An invited speaker gives an address on some aspect of Pepys's life. Recent subjects have included: Pepys's Musical World, Pepys and Trinity House, and Pepys and St Paul's School.

Several outings to Pepysian places of interest are also organised round the year.

== Membership ==
The Club initially aimed at bringing together those who had made significant academic contributions to Pepysian studies, and the initial membership was restricted to 50. Due to demand, this number was rapidly increased to 70, Pepys's age when he died. The first female member was elected in 1952.

Membership was extended in 2003 to 140 UK members, plus 14 overseas members. Anyone with a genuine personal interest in Pepys and his times qualifies for election on proposal by an existing member, and upon approval by the executive committee. Membership is eclectic, ranging from bishops, historians, navy officers, and writers, to lawyers, surgeons, and academics.

Honorary ex-officio members are:

- The High Master of St Paul's School (Pepys attended this London school from 1645 to 1650);
- The Master of Magdalene College (Pepys attended this Cambridge college from 1650 to 1654);
- The Pepys Librarian (Pepys bequeathed his 3,000 volumes to the Pepys Library housed by Magdalene College);
- The 2nd Permanent Under-Secretary of State for Defence (Pepys was a Navy Board officer);
- The Rector of St Olave Hart Street (where Pepys worshipped);
- The Treasurer of Christ's Hospital (Pepys was appointed a Governor of the Hospital in 1676, a Treasurer in 1698 and a Vice-President from 1699 to his death in 1703);
- The Deputy Master of the Corporation of Trinity House (Pepys was sworn a Younger Brother in 1662 and an Elder Brother in 1672; he became a Warden in 1675 and served twice as a Master, in 1677–8 and 1685–6);
- The Master of The Worshipful Company of Clothworkers (Pepys was appointed a Master in 1677–8);
- The President of the Royal Society (Pepys was elected a Fellow in 1665 and a President in 1684–6);
- and The Chairman of C. Hoare & Co (Pepys's bank).

== Samuel Pepys Award ==
At the beginning of the 21st century, the Club founded the Samuel Pepys Award, a biennial prize given for a book that "makes the greatest contribution to the understanding of Samuel Pepys, his times or his contemporaries in the interest of encouraging scholarship in this area." It was first presented in 2003 to mark the centenary of the Club and the tercentenary of Pepys's death. The first recipient was Claire Tomalin for her book Samuel Pepys: The Unequalled Self.

=== Winners ===
| Year | Winner | Book | ISBN |
|---|---|---|---|
| 2003 | Claire Tomalin | Samuel Pepys: The Unequalled Self | 978-0-670-88568-8 |
| 2005 | Frances Harris | Transformations of Love: The Friendship of John Evelyn and Margaret Godolphin | 978-0-199-25257-2 |
| 2007 | John Adamson | The Noble Revolt: The Overthrow of Charles I | 978-0-297-84262-0 |
| 2009 | J. David Davies | Pepys's Navy: Ships, Men and Organisation 1649–1689 | 978-1-848-32014-7 |
| 2011 | Michael Hunter | Boyle: Between God and Science | 978-0-300-12381-4 |
| 2013 | Henry Reece | The Army in Cromwellian England 1649–1660 | 978-0-198-20063-5 |
| 2015 | Paul Slack | The Invention of Improvement: Information and Material Progress in Seventeenth-Century England | 978-0-199-64591-6 |
| 2017 | John Walter | Covenanting Citizens: The Protestation Oath and Popular Political Culture in the English Revolution | 978-0-199-60559-0 |
| 2019 | David Como | Radical Parliamentarians and the English Civil War | 978-0-19-954191-1 |
| 2021 | Hugh Aldersey-Williams | Dutch Light: Christiaan Huygens and the Making of Science in Europe | 978-1-5098-9331-7 |
