= Causes of the French Revolution =

Causes of the conflict

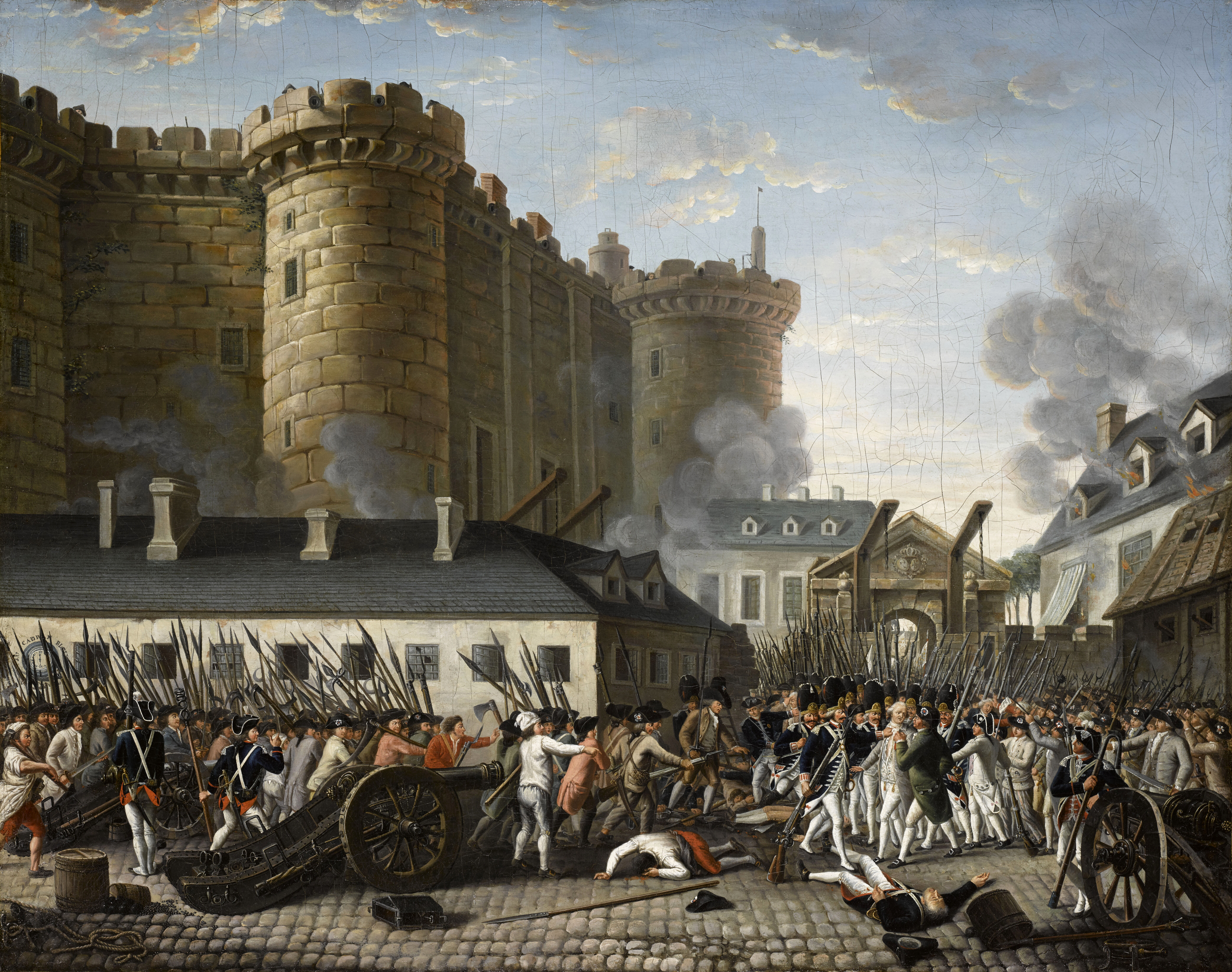
Storming of the Bastille

There is significant disagreement among historians of the French Revolution as to its causes. Usually, they acknowledge the presence of several interlinked factors, but vary in the weight they attribute to each one. These factors include cultural changes, normally associated with the Enlightenment; social change and financial and economic difficulties; and the political actions of the involved parties. For centuries, French society was divided into three estates or orders.

- The first estate, the highest class, consisted of the clergy.
- The second estate consisted of the nobility.
- The third estate consisted of the commoners. It included businessmen, merchants, court officials, lawyers, peasants, landless labourers and servants.

The first two estates together consisted of 2% of the population, whereas the third estate was the remaining 98%. All of the many types of taxes were paid by the third estate. The society was based on the old French maxim "The nobles fight; the clergy pray, and the people pay".

Beyond these relatively established facts about the social conditions surrounding the French Revolution, there is significant dissent among historians. Marxist historians, such as Lefebvre and Soboul, see the social tensions described here as the main cause of the revolution, as the Estates-General allowed them to manifest into tangible political action; the bourgeoisie and the lower classes were grouped into the third estate, allowing them to jointly oppose the establishment. Others see these social issues as important, but less so than the Enlightenment or the financial crisis; François Furet is a prominent proponent of the former, Simon Schama of the latter.

== Political background ==
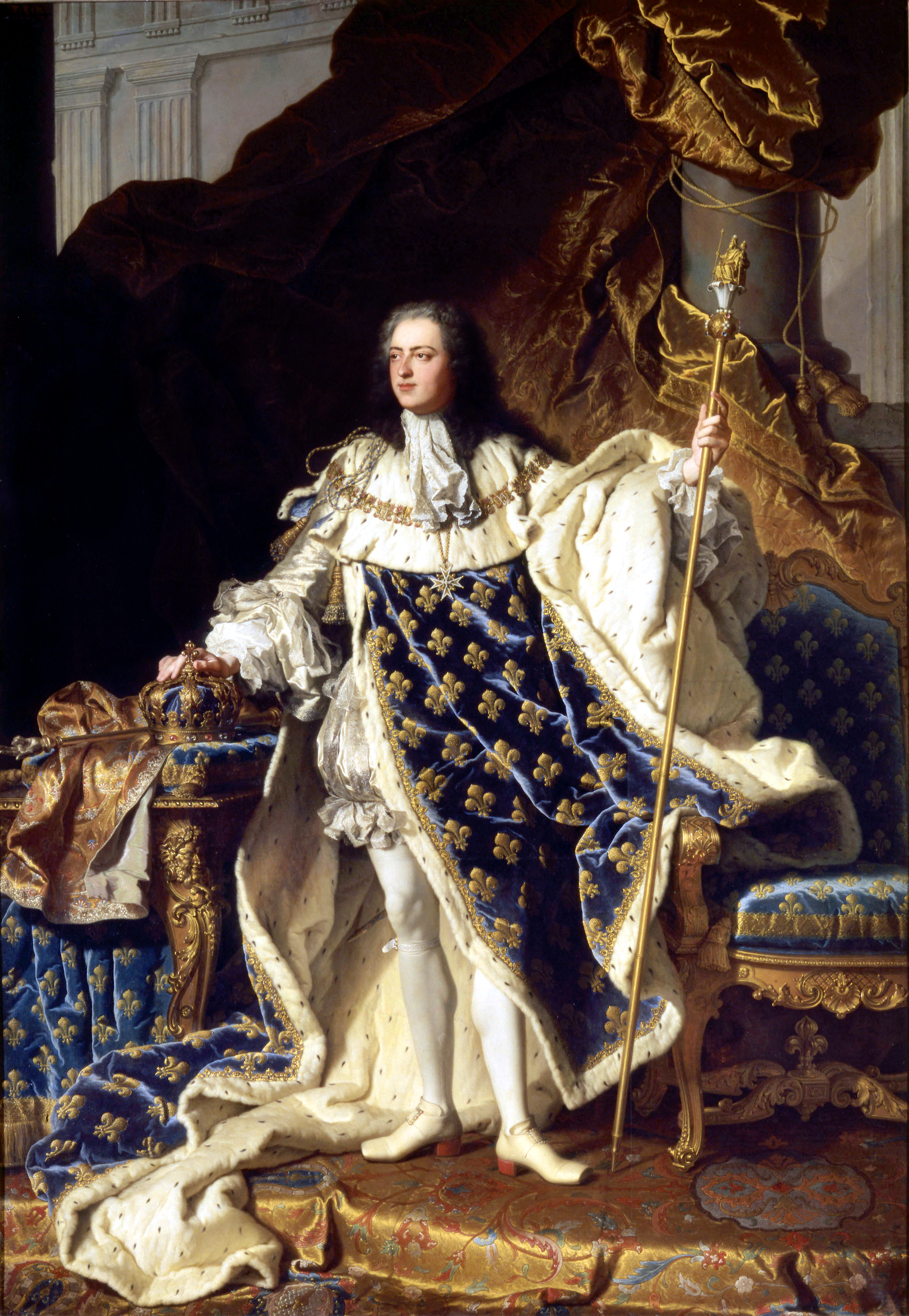
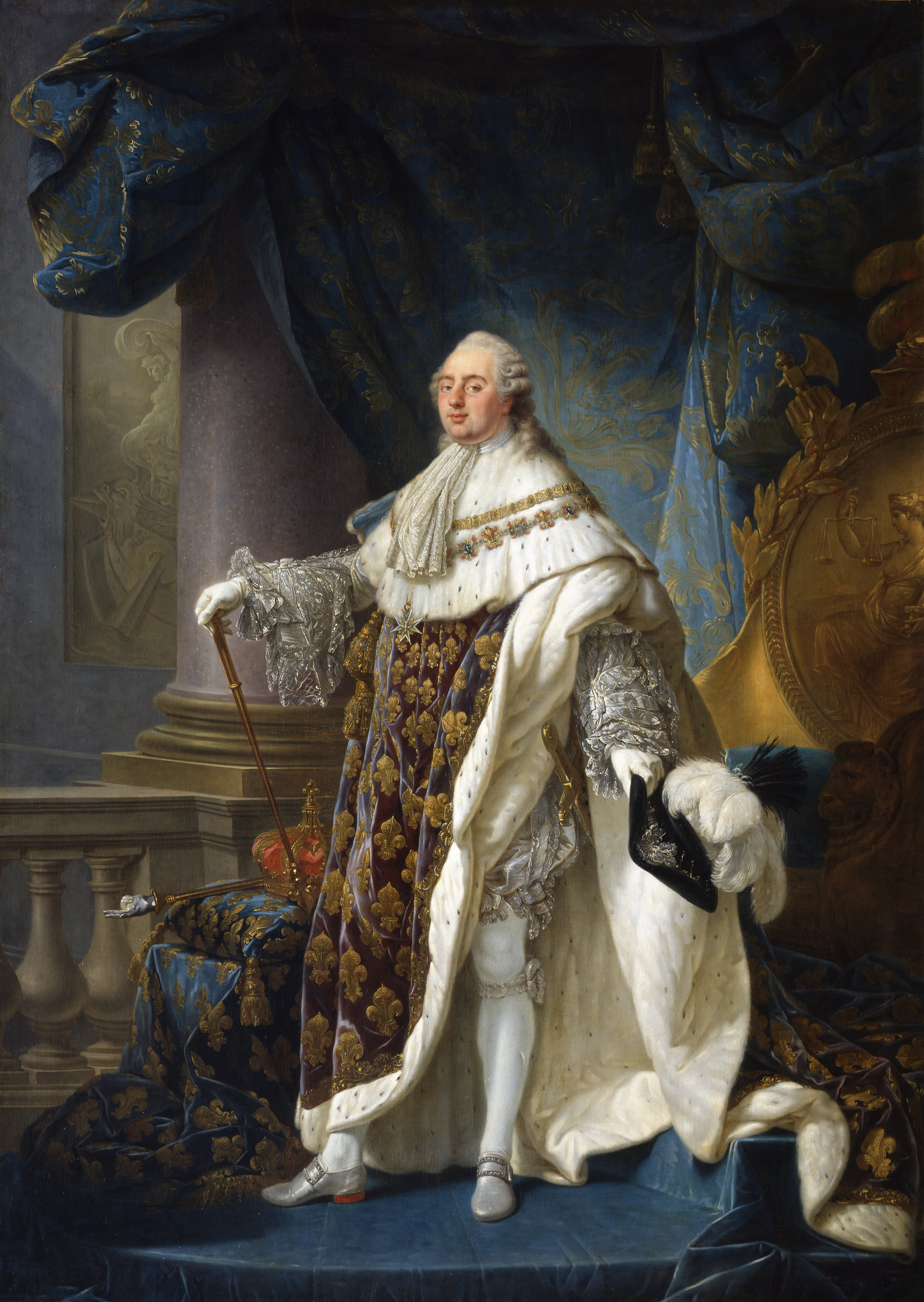
L-R: Louis XIV, Louis XV and Louis XVI, the last three kings before the revolution.

Prior to the revolution, France was a de jure absolute monarchy, a system that became known as the Ancien Régime. In practice, the power of the monarchy was typically checked by the nobility, the Roman Catholic Church, institutions such as the judicial parlements, national and local customs and, above all, the threat of insurrection. Prior to 1789, the last severe threat to the monarchy was the Fronde civil wars from 1648 to 1653 during the minority of Louis XIV. Although the earlier reign of Louis XIII had already seen a move towards centralization of the country, the adulthood of Louis XIV marked the peak of the French monarchy's power. His tactics for bringing the nobility under control included inviting them to stay at his extravagant Palace of Versailles and participate in elaborate court rituals with a detailed code of etiquette.

Some scholars have argued that Louis XIV contributed to the monarchy's downfall by failing to reform the government's institutions while the monarchy was still secure. Others, including François Bluche, argue that Louis XIV cannot be held responsible for problems that would emerge over 70 years after his death.

His successor Louis XV was less interested in governing and his reign saw a decline in the power of the monarchy. Historians generally describe his reign as a period of stagnation, foreign policy setbacks, and growing popular discontent against the monarchy. His affairs with a succession of mistresses also damaged its reputation.

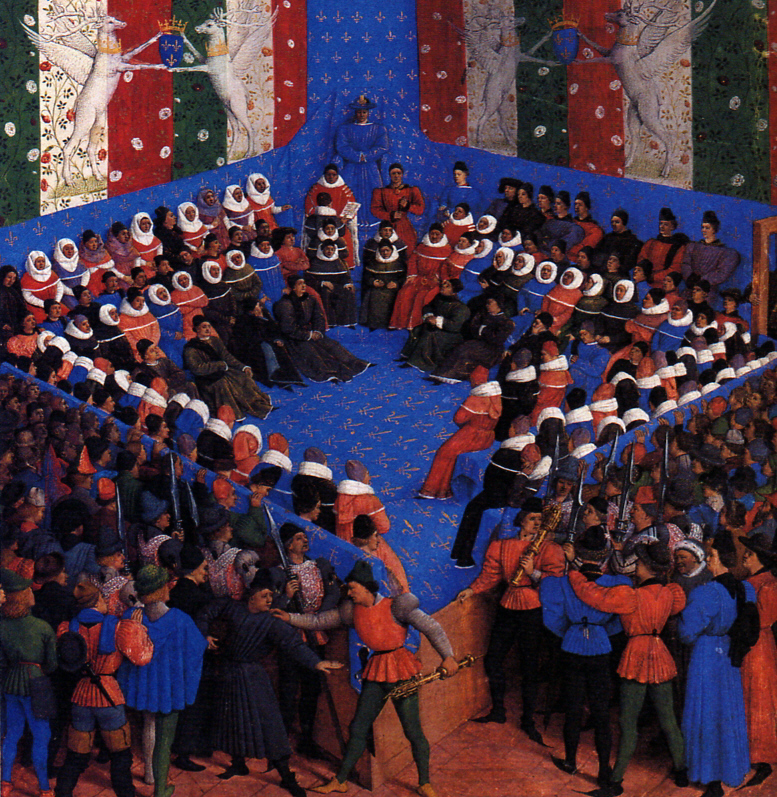
Depiction of a Lit de justice at the Parlement of Paris in 1450.

During the reign of Louis XVI, the power and prestige of the monarchy had declined to the point where the king struggled to overcome aristocratic resistance to fiscal reform, with the parlements often being focal points for this resistance. The parlements were regional courts of appeal that had the de facto power to block the implementation of legislation in their respective provinces. They were each dominated by the regional nobility. The power of the parlements had been curtailed by Louis XIV, but mostly reinstated during the minority of Louis XV. In 1770, Louis XV and René de Maupeou again curtailed the power of the parlements, except for the Parlement of Paris, the one that was the most powerful. Louis XVI reinstated them early in his reign. Alfred Cobban describes the Parlement of Paris as "though no more in fact than a small, selfish, proud and venal oligarchy, [it] regarded itself, and was regarded by public opinion, as the guardian of the constitutional liberties of France."

Having already obstructed tax reform proposals during the reign of Louis XV, the parlements would play a major role in obstructing Louis XVI's attempts to resolve the debt crisis. Traditionally, a king could quell a recalcitrant parlement by conducting a lit de justice ceremony, in which he would appear there in person to demand that they register an edict. However, by 1787, Louis XVI could not get this tactic to work. The parlements enjoyed wider support from the commoners, who appreciated their role as a check on royal power. This placed Louis XVI at a disadvantage when he attempted to coerce and then suppress them in 1787–88.

By 1789, Louis XVI struggled to maintain power, and early French revolutionaries from the Third Estate began to rebel. The milices bourgeois was a military force formed in France by the middle class, made to maintain order and define the lower classes from the privileged nobility. In the years leading up to the French Revolution, this militia had been reduced by government and nobility to auxiliary status. This reduction led to an increase in military members that the Third Estate appointed, and a decrease in middle and lower class representation. When these political changes were being made by the Second Estate, which consisted of French nobility, they began to acknowledge much of Louis XVI's faults.

Encyclopædia Britannica cites Prussia as an example of a European state where a strong monarchy succeeded in preventing revolution and preserving its power through reforms from above. Conversely, the lack of a constitutional monarchy meant that the French monarch was a target for any popular discontent against the government. Traditionally, this was tempered because there was an aversion to direct criticism and disrespect towards the king (lèse-majesté), but by the start of Louis XVI's reign, respect for the monarchy had declined. In his study of the libelle pamphlets and books, Robert Darnton noted that libelles during the reign of Louis XIV tended to direct their criticism towards individual figures like Cardinal Mazarin and even those that criticized the king's actions directly still had a respectful tone. During the reign of Louis XV, libelles became willing to bluntly criticize both the king and the entire system of the Ancien Régime.

== Social background ==
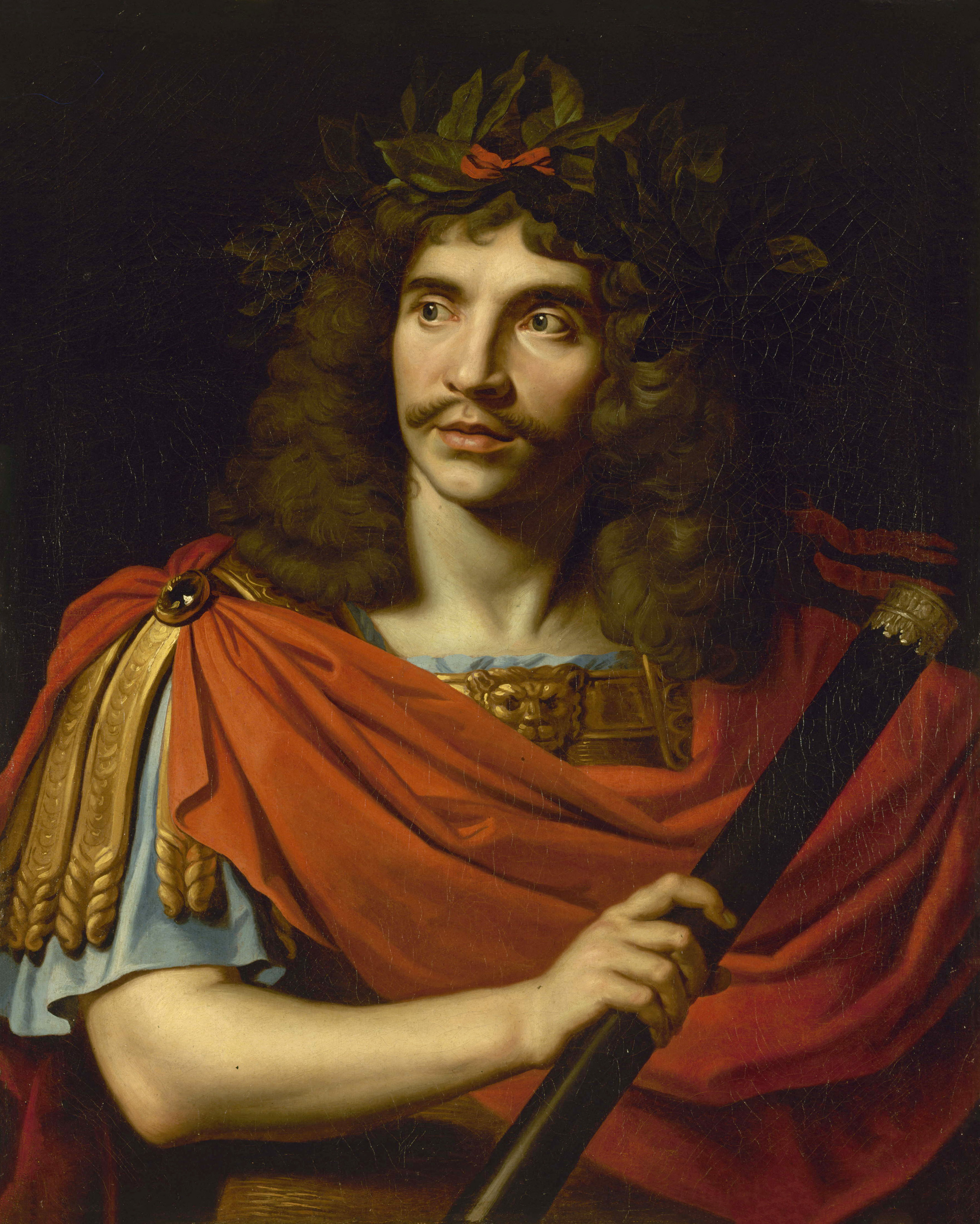
The 17th-century French playwright Molière (1622–73) catalogued the social-climbing essence of the bourgeoisie in Le Bourgeois gentilhomme (1670)

Throughout the early modern period a class of wealthy middlemen who connected producers emerged: the bourgeoisie. These bourgeoisie played a fundamental role in the French economy, accounting for 39.1% of national income despite only accounting for 7.7% of the population. Under the Ancien Régime they were part of the Third Estate, as they were neither clergymen (the First Estate) nor nobles (the Second Estate). Given their powerful economic position and their aspirations on a class-wide level, the bourgeois wanted to ascend through the social hierarchy, formalised in the Estate system. This is reflected by cahiers submitted by members of the Third Estate in March to April 1789: those of Carcassonne demanded that Louis "assure to the third estate the influence to which it is entitled in view of...its contribution to the public treasury". This desire for higher social position resulted in high levels of bourgeois entry into the Second Estate throughout the seventeenth and eighteenth centuries. This was enabled by several factors. The poverty of many noble families meant that they married bourgeois families; the nobles gained bourgeois wealth, while the bourgeoisie gained noble status. Moreover, corruption was rife, with many bourgeoisie simply attaching the noble particle 'de' to their name or assuming nonexistent titles. Investigations into this behaviour were stopped in 1727. Furthermore, many governmental offices and positions were sold to raise cash. The bourgeoisie bought these positions and hence were ennobled; by 1765, six thousand families had gained nobility through this method. Such entryism resulted in significant social tension as the nobles were angered that these bourgeoisie were entering their ranks (despite often having been bourgeois themselves one or two generations previously) while the bourgeoisie were angered that the nobles were trying to prevent them ascending and being disdainful when they did ascend. As such, there was significant social tension between the dominant classes at the time of the French Revolution.

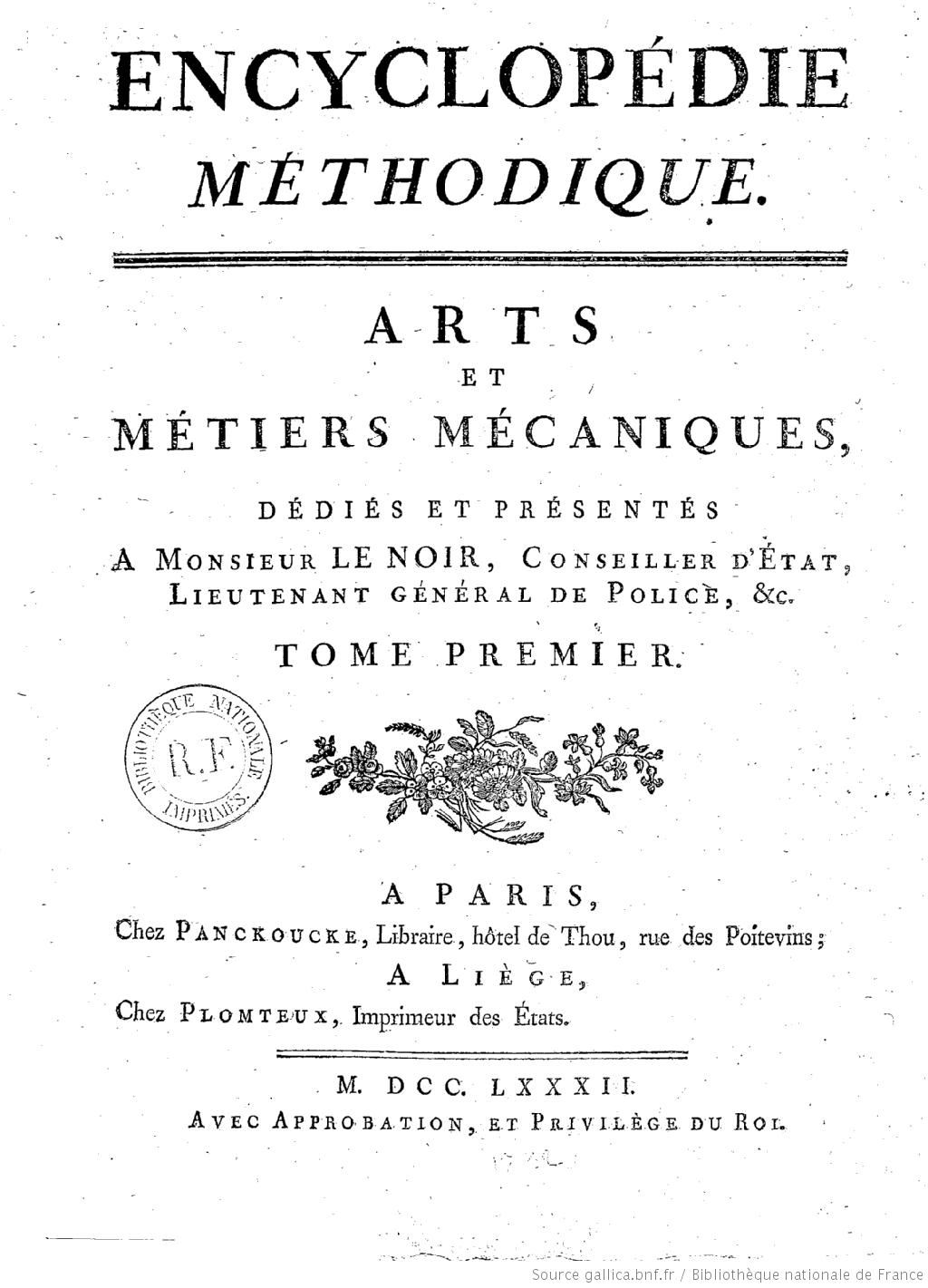
First page of the Encyclopédie méthodique published in 1782 (Panckoucke, Paris).

== Cultural change ==
There are two main points of view with regard to cultural change as a cause of the French Revolution: the direct influence of Enlightenment ideas on French citizens, meaning that they valued the ideas of liberty and equality discussed by Rousseau and Voltaire et al, or the indirect influence of the Enlightenment insofar as it created a "philosophical society". The Enlightenment ideas were particularly popularised by the influence of the American War of Independence on the soldiers who returned, and of Benjamin Franklin himself, who was a highly dynamic and engaging figure in the French court when he visited. The French publication of Locke's Treatises in 1724 also played an important role in influencing both pre-Revolutionary and post-Revolutionary ideology. He has been considered an ideological "father" of the revolution.

When the First and Second Estates, as well as the King, failed to respond to the Third Estate's demands, they eschewed the authority of the King, resulting in the Tennis Court Oath and the subsequent development of the Revolution. Furet, the foremost proponent of the 'philosophical society' nuance to this view, says that the ideas of the Enlightenment were discussed in clubs and meetings "where rank and birth were second to ... abstract argument". This resulted in a breakdown of the stratification that still divided the bourgeois and the nobles, fundamentally changing France's social organisation. As such, when the Estates-General was called, its rigid organisation into Third Estate and Second Estate conflicted with the new, informal organisation, and caused dissent; the Third Estate had attained equal status to the nobility, in their view, and when they demanded that the Estates meet as equals, the King's refusal triggered their secession from royal authority. Furet and others argue that the direct influence of Enlightenment ideas only played a part after the Revolution had begun, insofar as it was used to justify revolutionary action and fill the lack of central, guiding ideology that disillusionment with the monarchy had created.

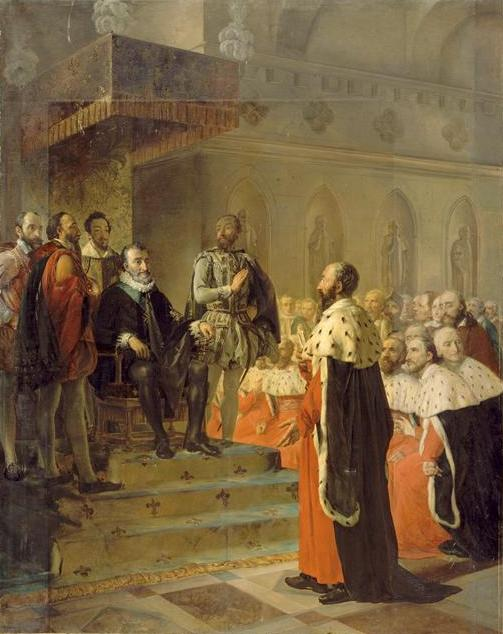
1822 depiction of the 1596 Assembly of Notables in Rouen

== Financial crisis ==
The financial crisis of the French crown played a role in creating the social background to the Revolution, generating widespread anger at the court, and (arguably most importantly) forcing Louis XVI to call the Estates-General. The court was deeply in debt, which, in conjunction with a poor financial system, created a crisis.

In order to service the debt, given that the Crown could find no more willing lenders, Louis attempted to call upon the nobility via an Assembly of Notables. However, the nobility refused to help—their power and influence had been steadily reduced since the reign of Louis XIV—and hence Louis was forced to rely upon the Estates-General. This meant that the discontented Third Estate (damaged by poor policy and low standards of living) were given the opportunity to air their grievances, and when they did not receive the desired response, the Revolution proper began; they denied the authority of the King and set up their own government.

=== Harvest failures ===
A majority of French citizens relied on agriculture to survive and increase wealth. Twenty out of twenty-six million citizens relied on agriculture in some way to support their jobs. In the peasant class there were two groups, those that owned land and those that bought land for cultivation.Agriculture accounted for around 75% of all domestic production, dominating the French economy. With outdated production methods, farming remained labour-intensive and increasingly susceptible to crop diseases. The increasing fluctuation of harvest production in the late 1760s had further plunged villages into uncertainty. The lack of diversification of jobs and distinction between agricultural and industrial workers foreshadowed the catastrophic impact that harvest failures would equally have in big cities, with even jobs like construction being largely dependent on migrant workers who brought their earnings back to small villages.

Harvest failures further touched the biggest industry in metropolitan France, textiles, with demand fluctuating according to harvest yield. These harvest failures led to an increase in scarcity and famine, resulting in a large population decrease and the peasant class becoming steadily restless. The textile industry played a crucial role in transforming cities; Amiens and Abbeville known for woolens, Rouen for cotton, amongst others. However, Lyons proved to be the only town where production was concentrated, with most production carried out in farms and villages. This presented a growing issue with most industrial workers beings peasants, as well as their consumers, leaving textile susceptible to the catastrophic impacts of harvest failures. Indeed, with harvest uncertainty in 1770, the silk industry went into crisis and demand for linen became increasingly unstable, ultimately leading to a failure from 1787-1788. This coincided with a decline in French exports to England, resulting in an industrial crisis.

=== Causes of debt ===
The French Crown's debt was caused by both individual decisions, such as intervention in the American War of Independence and the Seven Years' War, and underlying issues such as an inadequate taxation system. The War of Independence alone cost 1.3 billion livres, more than double the Crown's annual revenue, and in a single year—1781—227 million livres were spent on the campaign. The Seven Years' War was even more costly, at 1.8 billion livres, and the war preceding that, the War of the Austrian Succession, cost another billion livres. France faced an impossible dilemma: how to both maintain its international position and status by engaging in these conflicts, and fund them with an archaic and grossly inefficient system.

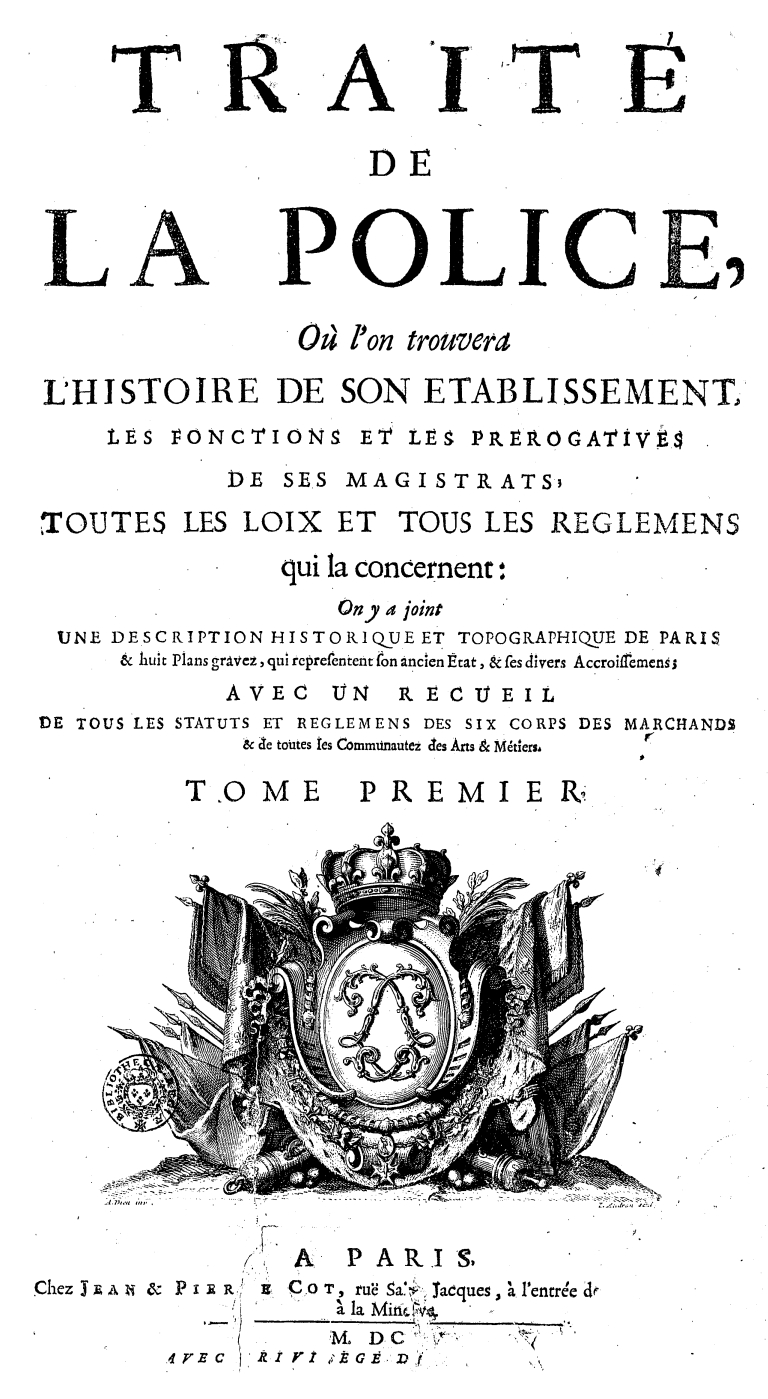
Le Traité de la Police by Nicolas de La Mare (1707): under the Ancien Régime, the police regulated price, quality and supply of bread.

The financial system was ineffective in multiple ways. First, despite the Bourbons' attempts to limit their power, the nobility still wielded significant influence at court; when Silhouette, a Controller-General, suggested taxing luxury items, he was removed from office due to noble opposition. Second, there was a system of tax immunities and feudal privileges that allowed many of France's wealthy citizens to avoid many taxes, notwithstanding the fact that few direct taxes were levied in the first place. The vingtième ("twentieth"), a tax of 5% successfully imposed on the nobility, was indeed paid, but this additional revenue was nowhere near enough to allow the Crown to maintain the levels of spending it needed or wanted. The capitation ("head tax") was also imposed, a tax that varied with social status and the number of people in the family, but this too was insufficient. The tax that was collected, a significant sum, was fixed at certain levels by the government through a system of tax farming; private individuals and groups were asked to collect a fixed amount of tax on behalf of the government, and could keep any excess. When the government failed to accurately forecast the levels of tax that they could collect, they did not benefit from any increase in national output. Furthermore, due to the obvious financial difficulties of the French Crown and the lack of a central bank, lenders demanded higher interest rates to compensate them for the higher risk; France faced interest rates twice as high as Britain did, which further increased the cost of servicing the debt and hence worsened the Crown's problems.

=== Impact of financial ministers ===
One of the ministers that Louis turned to in order to resolve the financial crisis was Turgot, financial minister from 1774 to 1776. Turgot abolished the regulations surrounding the food supply, which to this point had been strictly controlled by the royal police: they monitored the purity of bread flour, prevented price manipulation via hoarding, and controlled the inflows and outflows of grain to regions facing good and bad harvests. This caused rampant speculation and a breakdown of interregional import-export dynamics; famine and dissent (the Flour War) ensued. Turgot was forced to restore regulation and repress the riots. Though resolved, the failed experiment led to deep distrust of the monarchy, with rumours of their intention to starve the poor both prevalent and widely believed.

In 1783, Calonne was appointed as the Financial minister; Calonne, ahead of his time, advocated increasing public spending to drive up consumption and hence increase the country's GDP and tax revenues. However, this policy also failed, and only resulted in higher debt and France facing a primary deficit for the first time. The total fiscal deficit reached 140 million in 1787.

Necker, appointed in 1777–1781 and 1788–1789, used his connections with European banks to facilitate lending in order to fund wars and service the debt, but this proved a temporary measure (as might be expected) and had little long term value.

== Living standards ==
Furthermore, significant resentment was felt by the poorer members of the Third Estate (industrial and rural labourers), largely due to vast increases in the cost of living. From 1741 to 1785, there was a 62% increase in real cost of living. In 1788 and 1789, there were poor harvests, perhaps triggered by the 1783 Laki eruption in Iceland. This caused bread prices to rise in conjunction with falling wages. In 1789 itself, there was a 25% fall in real wages and an 88% increase in the price of bread.

These immediate issues increased the resentment of the underlying problem of the inequality of land distribution, in which peasants made up approximately 82-88% of the French population, but only owned 35% of the land. They had to pay various dues to their noble landlords, taxes which were often disproportionately high in comparison to their income. However, whereas rural peasants could at least sustain themselves with their farms, the poor harvests had a much worse impact on Paris, which played a major role in the rise of the sans-culottes.
