= George Whale (freethinker) =

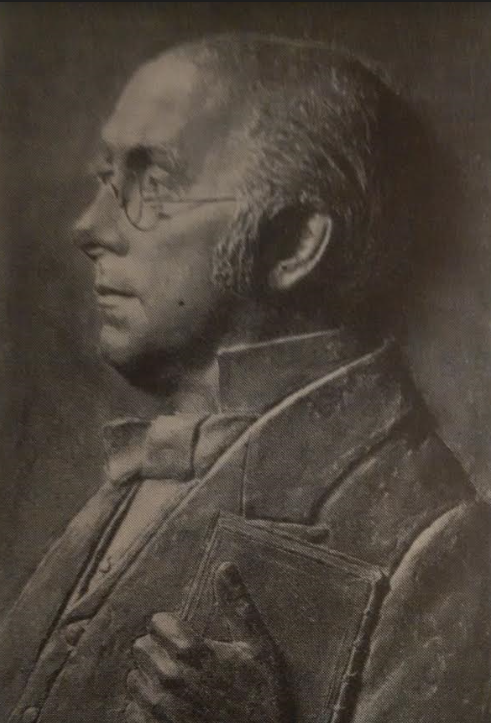
- Born: 25 November 1849
- Died: 4 May 1925 (aged 75)
- Occupations: Solicitor, freethinker

George Whale (25 November 1849 – 4 May 1925) was an English solicitor, local politician and freethinker.

== Biography ==
Whale worked as a solicitor in Huntingdon and Woolwich. He was the Mayor of Woolwich (1908–1909) and was a Liberal parliamentary candidate for Marylebone. He was a fellow of the Royal Historical Society and member of the Folklore Society, Johnson Club, Omar Khayyam Club, National Liberal Club and Samuel Pepys Club. He lived at York Terrace and had a library of 60,000 books.

Whale was Chairman of the Rationalist Press Association, 1922–1925.

Whale was a friend of H. G. Wells. He was married to author Winifred Stephens.

Whale collapsed and died after giving a speech at the Annual Dinner of the Rationalist Press Association in 1925.

== Publications ==
- A Fragment on Political Education (1882)
- Greater London and Its Government: A Manual and Yearbook (1888)
- Johnson Club Papers by Various Hands (1899)
