= Marc de Villiers du Terrage =

French writer and historian

Baron Marc de Villiers du Terrage (born 3 March 1867 in Paris, died 28 January 1936 in Rosporden) was a French man of letters and historian, notably of French Louisiana. His book Histoire de la fondation de la Nouvelle-Orléans (1717-1722) won the Prix Thérouanne in 1919. He was the grandson of Édouard de Villiers du Terrage.

== Selected works ==
- Un secrétaire de Louis XIV: Toussaint Rose [Louis XIV's secretary: Toussaint Rose]. Paris: May et Motteroz. 1891.
- Les dernières années de la Louisiane française; [The last years of French Louisiana]. Paris: E. Guilmoto. 1904.
- Conquistadores et roitelets. Rois sans couronne: du roi des Canaries à l'empereur du Sahara [Conquistadors and Petty Kings. Uncrowned Kings: From the King of the Canaries to the Emperor of the Sahara]. Paris: Perrin et cie. 1906.
- Histoire des clubs de femmes et des légions d'amazones, 1793-1848-1871 [History of Women's Clubs and Legions of Amazons, 1793-1848-1871]. Paris: Plon-Nourrit. 1910.
- Histoire de la fondation de la Nouvelle-Orléans (1717-1722) [History of the Founding of New Orleans (1717-1722)]. Paris: Imprimerie nationale. 1917.
