= Winifred Stephens Whale =

- Born: Sophia Charlotte Winifred Stephens; 30 January 1870; Naunton, Gloucestershire
- Died: 8 September 1944 (aged 74); Blockley, Gloucestershire
- Occupations: Teacher, author, editor, journalist, and translator
- Spouse: George Whale (married 1923)
- Relatives: John Hicks (nephew)

Winifred Stephens Whale (30 January 1870 - 8 September 1944) was an English teacher, author, editor, journalist, and translator.

== Early life ==
Sophia Charlotte Winifred Stephens was born in Naunton, Gloucestershire on 30 January 1870, to Catherine and Reverend J. M. Stephens. She was educated in France and at Tudor Hall School.

== Career ==
In 1923, she married solicitor, freethinker, and chairman of the Rationalist Press Association George Whale, who died suddenly in 1925. The following year, with Edward Clodd and Clement Shorter, she published a volume in his memory. During their marriage, the couple hosted a literary salon, which included guests such as, H. G. Wells, James George Frazer, and the political scientist Graham Wallas.

Whale wrote a number of books on French history and literature, as well as translations from the French by writers such as Anatole France. Her works included The France I Know (1918) and Women of the French Revolution (1922). She also wrote on the life of Marguerite de Valois.

Whale was honorary secretary for the annual Femina Vie Heureuse Prize, awarded for "the best work of imagination produced within a given time by one of the younger British authors or by one who is considered not to have received adequate recognition". The prize was established under the auspices of the French magazine Femina and affiliated with France's Prix Femina. A French committee chose the winner from a shortlist submitted by the British committee, while the British committee chose the winner of the reciprocal Heinemann Prize from a shortlist of French works submitted by the French committee.

== Personal life ==
Whale was the maternal aunt of economist John Hicks, to whom she became a "second mother" and her Cotswolds house "his second home". Whale gifted a large part of her "fabulous general library collection" to her nephew, who — with his wife Ursula Kathleen Hicks — moved into Whales' house in 1946.

== Death ==
Winifred Whale died in Blockley on 8 September 1944. For her obituary in The Times, a correspondent wrote:

Mrs. George Whale was a devoted friend of France. When, after the last war, the Femina-Vie-Heureuse-Northcliffe Prize Committee (now the Stock-Heinemann Prize Committee) was founded she became its honorary secretary. Half French. half English, the committee had for its purpose the discovery and encouragement of literary talent in the two countries. With her wide knowledge of French literature, and many personal friends in Paris, Winifred Whale was the mainspring of the whole. She helped to bring to the knowledge of French readers the work of such writers as Virginia Woolf and E. M. Forster, to English readers that of Julien Green and Henri de Montherlant, to name a few out of half a hundred prizewinners. Mrs. Whale had been in later years an invalid: but her ever-increasing suffering never diminished her interest in the work of the committee, her alertness of mind, and tranquil good humour.

== Bibliography ==
=== As author ===
- French Novelists of To-day, First Series (1908)
- Margaret of France, Duchess of Savoy, 1523-74; a biography (1911)
- From the Crusades to the French Revolution, a History of the La Trémoille Family (1913)
- French Novelists of To-day, Second Series (1915)
- The Soul of Russia (1916)
- Madame Adam (Juliette Lamber), la grande Française: from Louis Philippe until 1917 (1917)
- The France I Know (1918)
- Women of the French Revolution (1922)

=== As translator ===
- The Life of Joan of Arc by Anatole France (1908)
- The Red Lily by Anatole France (1908)
- Legends of Indian Buddhism by Eugène Burnouf (1911)
- The letters of Marie Antoinette, Fersen and Barnave (1913)
- The Six Greatest Novels of Anatole France by Anatole France (1914)
- Crainquebille, Putois, Riquet, and other profitable tales by Anatole France (1915)
- Clio by Anatole France (1922)
- Louis XI by Pierre Champion (1923)
- The Conquerors by André Malraux (1929)

=== As editor ===
- The Book of France: in aid of the French parliamentary committee's fund for the relief of the invaded departments (1915)
- George Whale 1849–1925 with Edward Clodd and Clement Shorter (1926)
