= Great Fear =

General panic in France in 1789

The Great Fear (French: Grande Peur) was a general panic that took place between 22 July to 6 August 1789, at the start of the French Revolution. Rural unrest had been present in France since the worsening grain shortage of the spring. Fuelled by rumours of an aristocrats' "famine plot" to starve or burn out the population, both peasants and townspeople mobilised in many regions.

In response to those rumors, fearful peasants armed themselves in self defense and, in some areas, attacked manor houses. The content of the rumors varied. In some areas it was believed that a foreign force was burning the crops in the fields, and in other areas it was believed that robbers were burning buildings. Fear of the peasant revolt was a contributing factor to the abolition of seigneurialism in France through the August Decrees.

== Causes ==
French historian Georges Lefebvre has demonstrated that the revolt in the countryside can be followed in remarkable detail. The revolt had both economic and political causes, predating the events of the summer of 1789. As Lefebvre comments, "To get the peasant to rise and revolt, there was no need of the French Revolution, as so many historians have suggested: when the panic came he was already up and away".

The rural unrest can be traced back to the spring of 1788, when a drought threatened the prospect of the coming harvest. Harvests had already been poor since the massive 1783 Laki eruption in Iceland. Storms and floods also destroyed much of the harvest during the summer, leading to both a decrease in seigneurial dues and defaults on leases. Frosts and snow damaged vines and ruined chestnut and olive groves in the south. Vagrancy became a serious problem in the countryside, and in some areas, such as the Franche-Comté in late 1788, peasants gathered to take collective action against the seigneurs. Historian Mary Kilbourne Matossian argues that one of the causes of the Great Fear was consumption of ergot, a hallucinogenic fungus. In years of good harvests, rye that was contaminated with ergot was discarded, but when the harvest was poor, the peasants could not afford to be so choosy.

== Development ==
In early 1789, the King's financial minister Jacques Necker warned that the countryside risked a general uprising, and by April, peasant uprisings had become increasingly organised and anti-seigneurial in character. Demands were made for the cancellation of harvest payments and the restoration of rights, such as the right of grazing. The drawing up of the Cahiers de doléances and subsequent elections contributed to the general expectation of reform. While Lefebvre argued that fear of aristocratic conspiracy was a contributing factor in the peasant revolts, Timothy Tackett has recently demonstrated that the rumours circulating in Paris could not possibly have traveled across the countryside quickly enough to have caused the uprising. Tackett posits a fear of anarchy, rather than of aristocratic conspiracy, as the "mystical multiplier" which Lefebvre originally set out to uncover. Peasants began to arm themselves, rang church bells to warn of danger, and took to attacking the symbols of the seigneurial regime, reclaiming tithes and grain.

The panic began in the Franche-Comté, spread south along the Rhône valley to Provence, east towards the Alps and west towards the centre of France. Almost simultaneously, a panic began in Ruffec, south of Poitiers, and spread to the Pyrenees, toward Berry and into the Auvergne. The uprising coalesced into a general Great Fear, as neighbouring villages mistook armed peasants for brigands.

During the attacks by the peasants on the estates of the feudal nobility and convent estates, their main objective was reported to have been finding and destroying the documents that granted the lords their feudal privileges over the peasantry, and burn them. In some cases, the manor houses were burned along with the documents. Hundreds of manor houses are reported to have been burned this way; however the houses burnt belonged to the minority of the houses attacked, and there was no indiscriminate pillaging. In most cases, the peasants simply left when the letters of feudal privileges had been destroyed, rather than burning the house. The members of the aristocracy typically fled from their castles and escaped being subjected to violence, and were afterward located by the militia who were sent to reinstate order after the end of the uprising. Of those aristocrats that were captured by the peasants, most were forced to leave their estates; a minority were reported to have been subjected to mistreatment, such as beatings and humiliation; in three instances landlords were killed.

Although the Great Fear is usually associated with the peasantry, all of the uprisings tended to involve all sectors of the local community, including some elite participants, such as artisans or well-to-do farmers. Often the bourgeoisie had just as much to gain from the destruction of the feudal regime as the poorer peasantry.

Although the main phase of the Great Fear died out by August, peasant uprisings continued well into 1790 and left few areas of France (primarily Alsace, Lorraine and Brittany) untouched. As a result of the Great Fear, on 4 August 1789 the National Assembly—in an effort to appease the peasants and forestall further rural disorders—formally abolished the feudal regime, including seigneurial rights. That led in effect to a general unrest among the French nobility.

== Comparison with previous peasant revolts ==
Peasant revolts such as the 14th century Jacquerie uprising and the 17th century Croquant rebellions, were not uncommon in France. Yves-Marie Bercé, in History of the Peasant Revolts, concludes "peasant revolts of the years 1789 to 1792 had much in common with their seventeenth-century counterparts: unanimity of the rural community, rejection of new taxation to which they were unaccustomed, defiance of enemy townsmen and a belief that there would be a general remission in taxes, particularly when the king decided to convene the estates general. In spite of all that is suggested by the political history of the period, the peasant disturbances at the beginning of the French Revolution did not depart from the typical community revolt of the preceding century".

The usual cause of communal violence was "an assault launched from outside upon the community as a whole", whether the outsider was those profiting from unfairly high bread prices, marauding bandits, witches or magistrates abusing power. That statement about 16th- and 17th-century uprisings appears at first to apply equally to the Great Fear of 1789. However, one distinctive aspect of the latter was fear of an ambiguous outsider at the outset of the disturbance.

Whether the brigands were English, Piedmontese or merely vagabonds was not easily determined, and when the Great Fear had spread to its largest expanse, it was a system—feudalism—rather than a specific person or group at which its animosity was directed. Earlier revolts had not been subversive but rather looked to a golden age which participants wished to see reinstated. The sociopolitical system was implicitly validated by a critique of recent changes in favour of tradition and custom. The Cahiers de doléances had opened the door to the people’s opinion directly affecting circumstances and policy, and the Great Fear evidenced that change.

The most glaring difference between the Great Fear of 1789 and previous peasant revolts was its scope. Spreading from half-a-dozen or so separate nuclei across the countryside, almost all of France found itself in rural uproar. In the 16th and the 17th centuries, revolts were almost always contained within the borders of a single province. That change in magnitude reflects to what extent social discontent was with the entire governmental system (and its ineffectiveness), rather than with anything particular to a locality. As Tackett argues, the specific manifestation of the fear of brigands (who they were and what they were most likely to attack) may have been contingent upon local contexts, but the fact that the brigands were perceived as a genuine threat to the peasants across the country in a wide variety of local contexts speaks to a more systemic disorder.

Comparing the Croquant rebellions with the Great Fear of 1789 reveals some key similarities and differences. From 1593 to 1595 in Limousin and Périgord, groups of peasants rose up against the armed forces that occupied the countryside and raised funds by levying taxes and ransom. In a series of assemblies, the Croquants, as they were pejoratively called, worked on a military plan for action and successfully expelled the garrisons from their lands. The letters between those assemblies justified their armed resistance as opposition to unjust claims on their property. When the chaotic political situation was stabilized with the coronation of Henry IV, the revolts ended, and the peasants were eventually accorded the tax rebate they had demanded earlier. The Croquants had specific goals and achieved them. The same cannot be said of the participants in the Great Fear of 1789, which broke with another pattern typical of peasant revolts in earlier centuries. The panic lasted for more than a few weeks and took place during the most labour-intensive months. Communal violence was but one tactic of many for opposing an enemy, and 16th- and 17th-century peasants, drawing on a heritage of communal justice, might rise up to prevent enclosement of a communal grazing space like a marsh to demand lower bread prices or to evade their taxes. During the reign of Louis XIV, however, popular revolt became an ever-less viable option for reform, as the state both became better able to respond to insurgency and addressed many of the issues at the heart of peasant revolts. Reforms in the military structure prevented French soldiers from plundering French soil, and armed conflict with other powers was not fought at home. Thus, the threat of roaming bandits was a particularly poignant one, which evoked an era of lawlessness that the French monarchy had successfully countered in previous years.

There was much in common between the peasantry in the Great Fear of 1789 and the peasants of the revolts of the 16th and 17th centuries, but they were malleable and changed by the experience of Bourbon rule and its subsequent dissolution. Without the monarchy or a replacement government to administer and protect the people, the harvest and, with it, life itself were in grave danger.
