= Pacte de Famine =

18th-century conspiracy theory

The Pacte de Famine (French pronunciation: [pakt də famin], Famine Pact) was a conspiracy theory adopted by many living in France during the 18th century. It held that foods, especially grain, were intentionally withheld from them for the benefit of privileged interest groups. The French obtained much of their nourishment from grain at the time.

== Origins ==
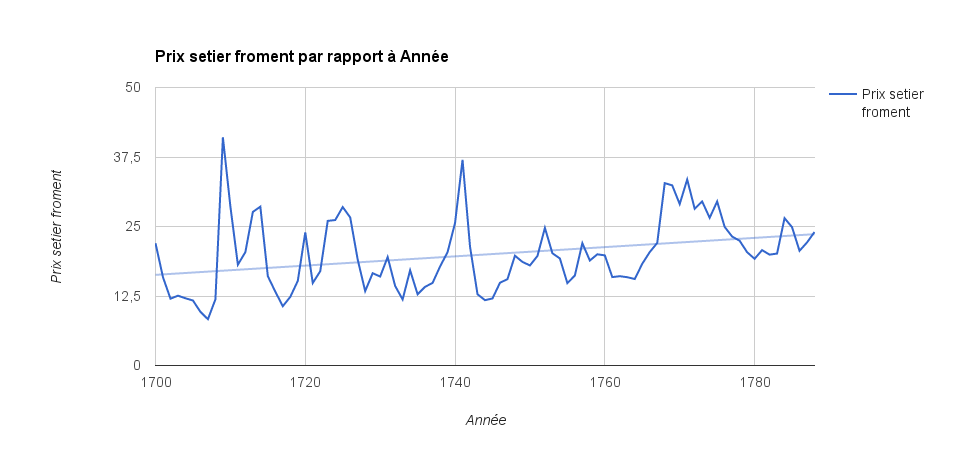
Price in livres of a setier (about 117 kg) of wheat in Paris, 1700–88.

The conspiracy theory had roots in pre-revolutionary France, and some of its strongest manifestations were evident during the 1760s and 1770s. The collective mentality surrounding the belief then served as a tool for the French to make sense of the political environment.

Between 1715 and 1789, the population of France increased by 6 million from 22 million to 28 million. Population growth and demographic changes during the 18th century help to explain the high demand for food and the lack of food supply at the time. Many faced hunger by scarcity of food and found it difficult to fend off illness. At times, "bad grain" was blamed for making citizens ill.

== Role of Turgot ==
From 1715 to 1774, Louis XV was the ruling King of France. During his reign, many people faced famine and other struggles and lives in a society in need of reform. He was criticised for his lack of leadership, which hindered necessary reforms from being made. In 1774, he died, and his successor, Louis XVI, took the throne and worked early on to restore order in the kingdom. One of his first actions was to appoint Jacques Turgot as Finance Minister.

Turgot followed members of Physiocracy. The physiocrats, or économistes as they called themselves, wanted to move away from mercantilism and felt it was possible to produce more value from the land. Dr. Francois Quesnay, Dupont de Nemours and Vincent de Gournay were important pioneers of the movement and had a great impact on Turgot. Gournay, a free-marketer, was Intendant for Commerce and spent extensive time with Turgot. Gournay’s opinion on government economic policy was summarised as the government's policy should be laissez faire, laissez passer. In other words, "leave it alone, let it pass"; it is also known as the "invisible hand" notion. His economic principle did not favour government regulation and involvement in commerce. Turgot passionately defended Gournay’s belief in "laissez-faire" economic principles in his "Éloge de Gournay".

Before his appointment, Turgot has been Intendant of Limoges from 1761 to 1774. He had worked to implement free-market reforms on a local scale. While acting as the Minister of Finances, he worked to implement those reforms on a larger national scale. During his short time in office, Turgot established free trade in grain, worked to rectify the financial situation in France, focused on industry and agriculture, and wanted to reform the system so that feudal privileges no longer existed.

== Guild and grain regulation ==
In his efforts to revive the agricultural system, Turgot altered the urban production process. In 1775, he did away with guilds, moved the grain trade to a free-trade system and removed police regulations.

In 18th century France, the role of police involved far more than simply upholding the law but also held responsibility over many systems in society, even street sweeping. The notion at the time was that all systems needed administrative managing and that only the police could be trusted with keeping them in order. Once the guild system was transformed, police, to gain back a sense of control, made it difficult for business owners to obtain licenses by making applicants prove themselves "moral and solvent". These were businesses that Turgot had ordered to be opened.

The dissolution of the guilds prompted workers to riot, and social unruliness became a normal state of affairs. The guilds' members argued that the shift would lead to a more corporate system that would cause people to lose their sense of social identity and that chaos and instability would result.

The changes to grain and bread supply had serious implications and were met with even more disorder than was seen over the change in the guild system. The conflict was known as the Flour War of 1775. Reports from those who controlled the flow of grain stated there were problems with the grain harvest which caused shortages and less grain availability. The price of grain also increased and made it difficult for some to afford. News of a grain shortage was met with skepticism, and frustration rose from higher prices.

All tiers of society, including the poor, the police and the members of government, felt that the disruption of the grain and flour was done not for their sake but to satisfy the agendas of interest groups that were looking to make more money. The people felt that they were being exploited at the expense of their hunger. Those in opposition of the reform rioted, seized grain that came in on shipments and offered what they felt was the "just price" for it. That demonstrated a way in which the people took some power back into their own hands. The practice was known as "taxation populaire", or popular taxation.

There were documented efforts to deal with the grain shortage problems, such as increasing shipments from external sources, but belief in the famine plot remained. Conspiracy theory propaganda was rampant and quickly spread through the public. It eventually reached even Turgot, who came to have his own doubts about the situation. He suspected "agitation and bribery by his political rivals".

== Aftermath ==
The period's disorder proved to be so great that the economic experiment was stopped, and Turgot ended his career as the Minister of Finances in 1776. From 1775 to 1776, police returned to regulate the grain trade. Guilds were reinstated as well but took a new form because of the social changes taking place.

France survived those food shortages, and a new era of industrialisation eventually emerged in the prelude and the aftermath of the Revolution of 1789. Agricultural techniques became more modernised and productivity increased over the next century, which improves the life of many people in France.

== Sources ==
- Andress, David. French Society in Revolution, 1789–1799. France: Manchester University Press, 1999. ISBN 0-7190-5191-6
- Hart, David M. (2001). "Life and Works of Anne Robert Jacques Turgot". Econlib.org. Library of Economics and Liberty.
- Kaplan, Steven. The Famine Plot Persuasion in Eighteenth-Century France. Pennsylvania: Diane Publishing Co, 1982. ISBN 0-87169-723-8
- Price, Roger. A Concise History of France, Second Edition. Massachusetts: Cambridge University Press, 2005. ISBN 0-521-84480-0
