= 84th Training Command =

- 84th Training Command shoulder sleeve insignia
- Active: 5 August 1917–26 July 1919 (National Army); 24 June 1921–21 January 1946 (Organized Reserves); 19 December 1946–1 March 1952 (84th Airborne Div.); 1 March 1952–18 May 1959 (84th Infantry Div.); 18 May 1959–October 2004 (84th Training Division); October 2004–17 October 2007 (84th USARRTC); 17 October 2007–present (84th Training Command)
- Country: United States
- Branch: United States Army Reserve
- Type: Training
- Size: Command
- Part of: United States Army Reserve Command
- Garrison/HQ: Fort Knox, Kentucky
- Nickname: "The Railsplitters" (special designation)
- Motto: Strike Hard!
- Engagements: World War I; World War II; Rhineland; Ardennes-Alsace; Central Europe

Commanders
- Commander: Major General Kelly M. Dickerson
- Command Sergeant Major: CSM Freddy Trejo
- Notable commanders: John H. Hilldring; Alexander R. Bolling; Ralph M. Immell; Jeffrey W. Talley

Insignia
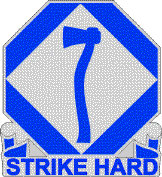
- Distinctive unit insignia

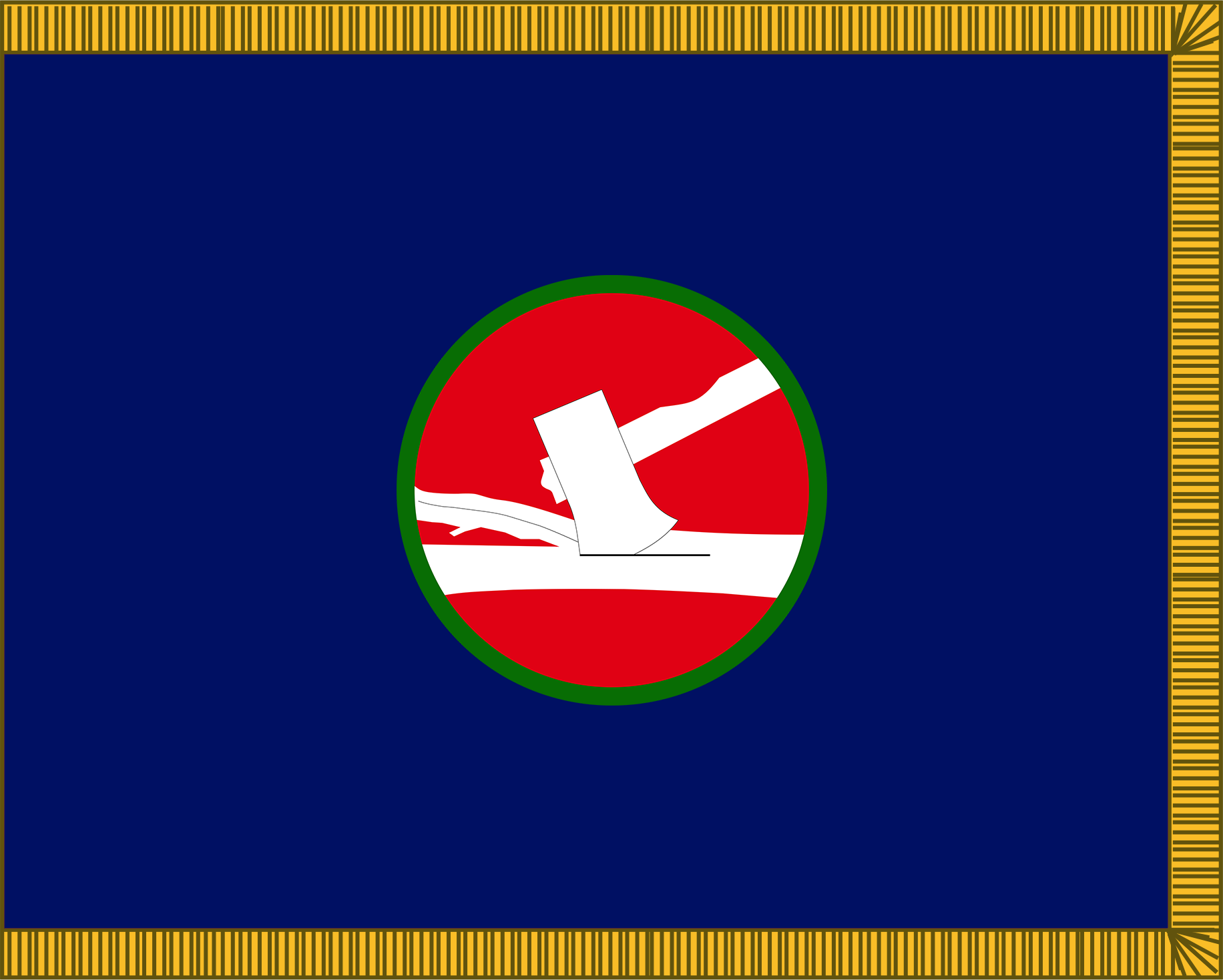
- 84th Training Command Flag

The 84th Training Command ("Railsplitters") is a formation of the United States Army. During World War I it was designated the 84th Division, American Expeditionary Forces; during World War II it was known as the 84th Infantry Division. From 1946 to 1952, the division was a part of the United States Army Reserve as the 84th Airborne Division. In 1959, the division was reorganized and redesignated once more as the 84th Division. The division was headquartered in Milwaukee in command of over 4,100 soldiers divided into eight brigades—including an ROTC brigade—spread throughout seven states.

Changes to the U.S. Army Reserve organizations from 2005 until 2007 redesigned the unit as the 84th Training Command (Leader Readiness) and it was paired with the Army Reserve Readiness Training Center (ARRTC). The flag resided at Fort McCoy, Wisconsin. As a result of Base Realignment and Closure (BRAC) throughout the Army, the ARRTC was moved to Fort Knox, Kentucky. The 84th Training Command (LR) underwent a command-directed move to Fort Knox, Kentucky in advance of the ARRTC in September 2008. Since the move, the 84th Training Command and ARRTC split, leaving the ARRTC with leader readiness and training support. The 84th Training Command was re-designated once again to 84th Training Command (Unit Readiness).

In September 2010, the 84th was renamed 84th Training Command and began reorganization. The 84th mission currently supports three numbered and three named training divisions – the 78th Training Division (Ft. Dix, NJ), the 86th Training Division (Ft. McCoy, WI), and the 91st Training Division (Ft. Hunter Liggett, CA), Atlantic Training Division (Ft. Dix, NJ), Great Lakes Training Division (Arlington Heights, IL), Pacific Training Division (Camp Parks, Dublin, CA)

Tradition has it that the division traces its lineage to the Illinois militia company in which a young Captain Abraham Lincoln served during the Black Hawk War of 1832. The division patch was selected to honor this legacy and the division's origin in Illinois. For this reason, the alternative nickname of "Lincoln County" Division" has been used to denote the 84th.

== History ==
=== World War I ===
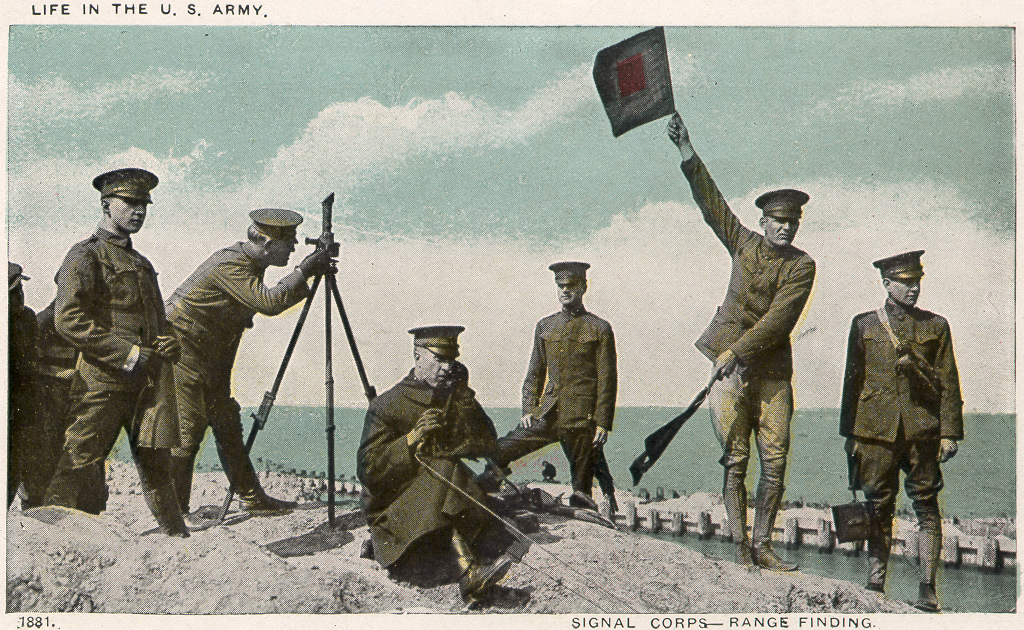
The 84th Division trained at Camp Zachary Taylor during World War I. Troops from Indiana and Kentucky made up this division.

The division was activated in September 1917 at Camp Zachary Taylor, Kentucky. It was initially made up of enlisted draftees from Indiana and Kentucky (who chose the formation's distinctive patch and nickname, an allusion to Abraham Lincoln who grew up in those two states), with a cadre of Regular Army, Officers Reserve Corps, and National Army officers, including Laurence Halstead as chief of staff. Later groups of enlisted men assigned to the division to replace men transferred to other units came from Ohio, North Dakota, and Montana. The division remained in training at Camp Taylor until August 1918. It was deployed to France in October 1918 to serve as a training formation for replacements which would be sent to the Western Front. At the war's end, the formation was recalled home and, without having seen combat actions, inactivated in January 1919.

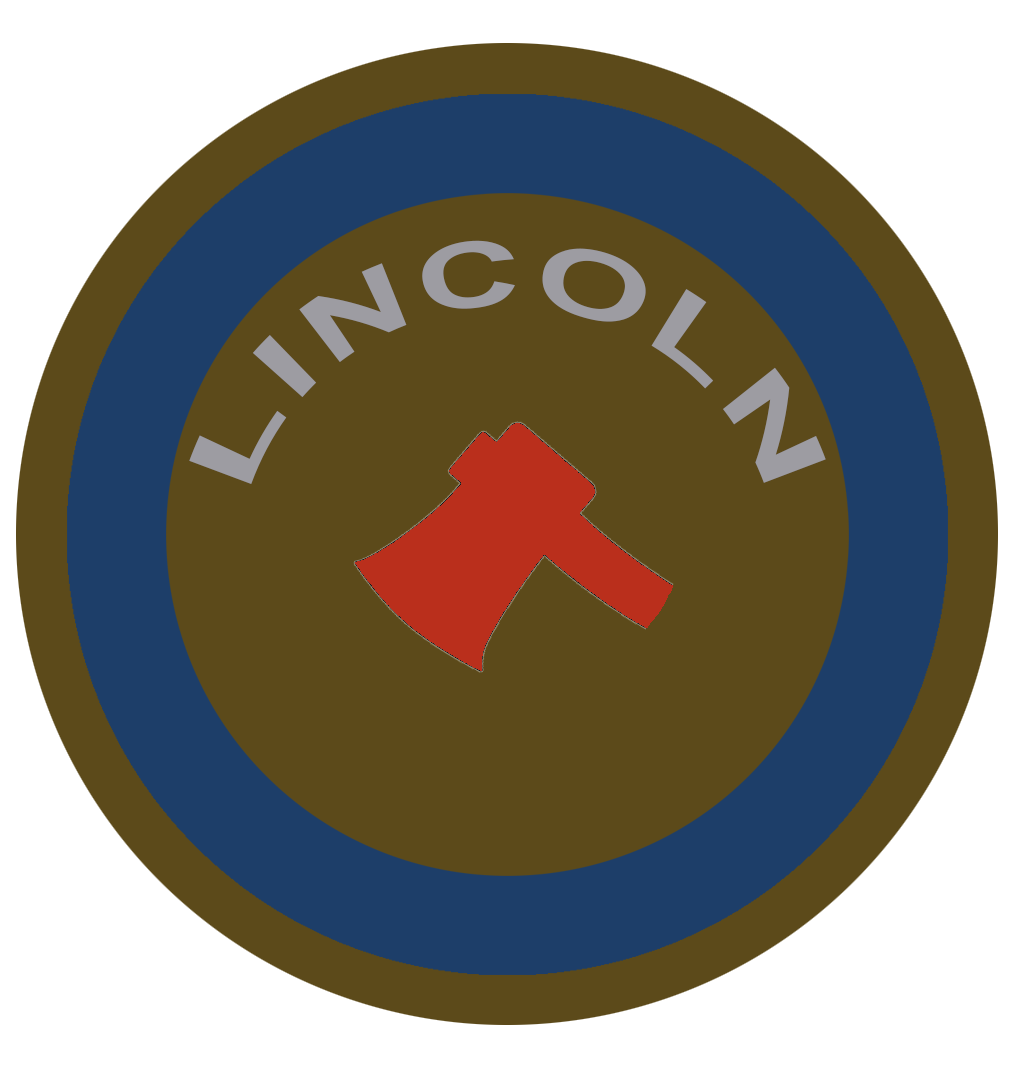
84th Infantry Division WWI SSI Olive Drab Version

Its commanders included Brig. Gen. Wilber E. Wilder (25 August 1917), Maj. Gen. Harry C. Hale (6 October 1917), Brig. Gen. Wilber E. Wilder (26 November 1917), Brig. Gen. Wilber E. Wilder (15 December 1917), Maj. Gen. Harry C. Hale (1 March 1918), Maj. Gen. Harry C. Hale (5 June 1918), Maj. Gen. Harry C. Hale (21 July 1918), Brig. Gen. Wilber E. Wilder (18 October 1918), Maj. Gen. Harry C. Hale (31 October 1918).

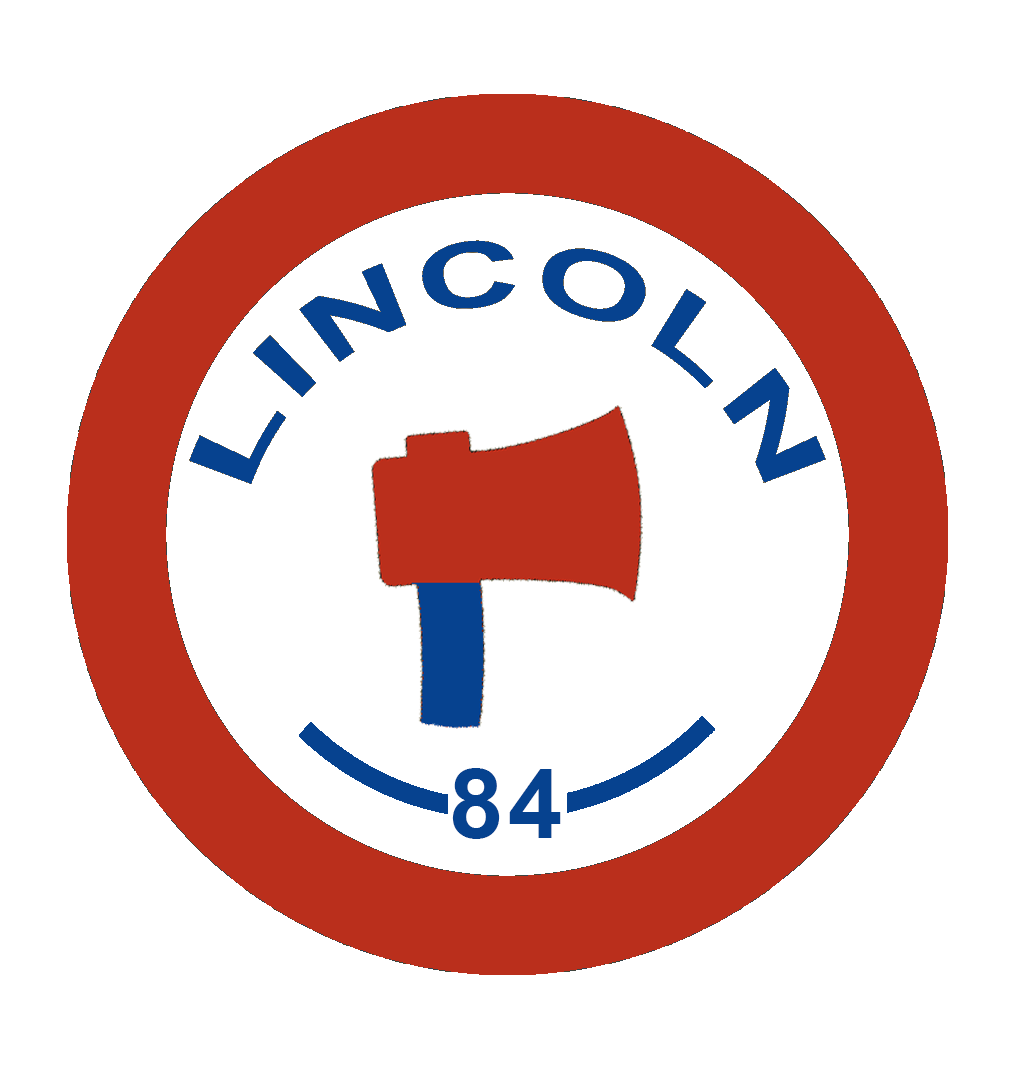
84th Infantry Division WWI SSI Red, White and Blue Variant

==== Order of battle ====
- Headquarters, 84th Division
- 167th Infantry Brigade
  - 333rd Infantry Regiment
  - 334th Infantry Regiment
  - 326th Machine Gun Battalion
- 168th Infantry Brigade
  - 335th Infantry Regiment
  - 336th Infantry Regiment
  - 327th Machine Gun Battalion
- 159th Field Artillery Brigade
  - 325th Field Artillery Regiment (75 mm)
  - 326th Field Artillery Regiment (75 mm)
  - 327th Field Artillery Regiment (155 mm)
  - 309th Trench Mortar Battery
- 325th Machine Gun Battalion
- 309th Engineer Regiment
- 309th Field Signal Battalion
- Headquarters Troop, 84th Division
- 309th Train Headquarters and Military Police
  - 309th Ammunition Train
  - 309th Supply Train
  - 309th Engineer Train
  - 309th Sanitary Train
    - 333rd, 334th, 335th, and 336th Ambulance Companies and Field Hospitals

=== Interwar period ===
The 84th Division headquarters arrived at the Port of Hoboken, New Jersey, aboard the USS Wilhelmina on 19 January 1919 after four months of overseas service and was demobilized on 26 July 1919 at Camp Zachary Taylor, Kentucky. It was reconstituted in the Organized Reserve on 24 June 1921, allotted to the Fifth Corps Area, and assigned to the XV Corps. The division was further allotted to Indiana as its home area. The division headquarters was organized on 6 September 1921 at room 408 in the Federal Building in Indianapolis. The headquarters was relocated in August 1922 to 24 East Michigan Street and moved again in 1928 to the Meridian Life Building. The headquarters was moved twice more before World War II: first to the Chamber of Commerce Building in 1933; and finally back to the Federal Building in 1937. It remained there until activated for World War II.

Though the designated mobilization and training station for the division was Camp Knox, Kentucky, and some of the division's training occurred there, much of the training activities for the division headquarters and its subordinate units transpired in other locations as well. For example, the headquarters occasionally trained with the staff of the 10th Infantry Brigade, 5th Division, at Fort Benjamin Harrison, Indiana. The infantry regiments of the division held their summer training primarily with the units of the 10th Infantry Brigade at Fort Thomas, Kentucky, or Fort Benjamin Harrison, but some years they went to Camp Knox. For some years, the 167th and 168th Infantry Brigades and their subordinate units conducted camp at the Culver Military Academy in Culver, Indiana. Other units, such as the special troops, artillery, engineers, aviation, medical, and quartermaster trained at various posts in the Fifth Corps Area, usually with similar active units of the 5th Division. For example, the division's artillery trained with the 5th Division artillery units stationed at Camp Knox; the 309th Engineer Regiment usually trained at Fort Benjamin Harrison; the 309th Medical Regiment trained at Camp Knox; and the 309th Observation Squadron trained with the 88th Observation Squadron at Wright Field, Ohio. In addition to the unit training camps, the infantry regiments of the division rotated responsibility for conducting the infantry Citizens Military Training Camps held at Fort Thomas and Camp Knox each year.

On a number of occasions, the division participated in various Fifth Corps Area or Second Army command post exercises in conjunction with other Regular Army, National Guard, and Organized Reserve units. Unlike the Regular and Guard units in the First Corps Area, the 84th Division did not participate in the Fifth Corps Area maneuvers and the Second Army maneuvers of 1936, 1940, and 1941 as an organized unit due to lack of enlisted personnel and equipment. Instead, the officers and a few enlisted reservists were assigned to Regular and Guard units to fill vacant slots and bring the units up to war strength for the exercises. Additionally, some were assigned duties as umpires or as support personnel.

=== World War II ===
==== Mobilization ====
Before Organized Reserve infantry divisions were ordered into active military service, they were reorganized on paper as "triangular" divisions under the 1940 tables of organization. The headquarters companies of the two infantry brigades were consolidated into the division's cavalry reconnaissance troop, and one infantry regiment was removed by inactivation. The field artillery brigade headquarters and headquarters battery became the headquarters and headquarters battery of the division artillery. Its three field artillery regiments were reorganized into four battalions; one battalion was taken from each of the two 75 mm gun regiments to form two 105 mm howitzer battalions, the brigade's ammunition train was reorganized as the third 105 mm howitzer battalion, and the 155 mm howitzer battalion was formed from the 155 mm howitzer regiment. The engineer, medical, and quartermaster regiments were reorganized into battalions. In 1942, divisional quartermaster battalions were split into ordnance light maintenance companies and quartermaster companies, and the division's headquarters and military police company, which had previously been a combined unit, was split.

The 84th Infantry Division was ordered into active military service on 15 October 1942, at Camp Howze, Texas, about 60 miles north of Dallas. It embarked on 20 September 1944 and arrived in the United Kingdom on 1 October, for additional training. The division landed on Omaha Beach, 1–4 November 1944, and moved to the vicinity of Gulpen, the Netherlands, 5–12 November.

==== Division organization ====
The division consisted of the following units:

84th Infantry Division organization (click to enlarge)

- 84th Infantry Division
  - 84th Infantry Division Headquarters
  - 84th Cavalry Reconnaissance Troop (Mechanized) (M3 scout cars and then M8 Greyhound armored cars)
  - 333rd Infantry Regiment
    - Headquarters and Headquarters Company
    - 3× Infantry battalions
      - each battalion consists of: 1× Headquarters and Headquarters Company, 3× Rifle companies, 1× Heavy Weapons Company
    - Cannon Company (T12 Gun Motor Carriages and T19 Howitzer Motor Carriages, later replaced by either M3 105mm towed howitzers or M7 Priest self propelled howitzers)
    - Anti-Tank Company (M3 37mm anti-tank guns, which were replaced by 1944 with M1 57mm anti-tank guns)
    - Service Company
  - 334th Infantry Regiment
    - same organization as 333rd Infantry Regiment
  - 335th Infantry Regiment
    - same organization as 333rd Infantry Regiment
  - 84th Infantry Division Artillery
    - Headquarters and Headquarters Battery
    - 325th Field Artillery Battalion
      - Headquarters and Headquarters Battery
      - 3× Batteries (M2 105mm towed howitzers)
      - Service Battery
    - 326th Field Artillery Battalion
      - same organization as 325th Field Artillery Battalion
    - 327th Field Artillery Battalion
      - Headquarters and Headquarters Battery
      - 3× Batteries (M1 155mm towed howitzers)
      - Service Battery
    - 909th Field Artillery Battalion
      - same organization as 325th Field Artillery Battalion
  - Headquarters Special Troops
    - Headquarters Company, 84th Infantry Division
    - 84th Signal Company
    - 84th Quartermaster Company
    - 784th Ordnance Light Maintenance Company
    - Military Police Platoon
    - 84th Infantry Division Band (attached)
  - 309th Engineer Combat Battalion
    - Headquarters and Headquarters and Service Company
    - 3× Engineer combat companies
  - 309th Medical Battalion
    - Headquarters and Headquarters Detachment
    - 3× Collecting companies
    - Clearing Company

==== Combat chronicle ====
The division entered combat on 18 November with an attack on Geilenkirchen, Germany, (Operation Clipper) as part of the larger offensive in the Roer Valley, north of Aachen. Operating under the command of Lt-Gen Brian Horrocks the division was supported by British tanks of the Sherwood Rangers Yeomanry, specialist armoured units of 79th Armoured Division, and XXX Corps' artillery. Taking Geilenkirchen on 19 November, the division pushed forward to take Beeck (Geilenkirchen) and Lindern (Geilenkirchen) in the face of heavy enemy resistance, 29 November. After a short rest, the division returned to the fight, taking Wurm and Würm (Geilenkirchen), Mullendorf, 18 December, before moving to Belgium to help stem the German winter offensive (Battle of the Bulge).

On a break from the Potsdam Conference, President Harry S. Truman strides along inspecting a line of G.I.'s of the 84th Infantry Division at Weinheim (50 miles S of Frankfurt, Germany), July 26, 1945. Stood behind him is the division's commander, Major General Alexander R. Bolling.

Battling in snow, sleet, and rain, the division threw off German attacks, recaptured Verdenne, 24–28 December, took Beffe and Devantave (Rendeux), 4–6 January 1945, and seized La Roche, 11 January. By 16 January, the Bulge had been reduced. After a 5-day respite, the 84th resumed the offensive, taking Gouvy and Beho. On 7 February, the division assumed responsibility for the Roer River zone, between Linnich and Himmerich (near Heinsberg), and trained for the river crossing.

On 23 February 1945, the first day of Operation Grenade, the division cut across the Roer, took Boisheim and Dülken, 1 March, crossed the Niers on 2 March, took Krefeld, 3 March, and reached the Rhine by 5 March. One day before, the 'Krefeld-Uerdinger Brücke' was blown off by Wehrmacht soldiers. The division trained along the west bank of the river in March.

After crossing the Rhine, 1 April, the division drove from Lembeck toward Bielefeld in conjunction with the 5th Armored Division, crossing the Weser River to capture Hanover, 10 April. By 13 April, it had reached the Elbe, and halted its advance, patrolling along the river. Soviet troops were contacted at Balow, 2 May 1945. The division remained on occupation duty in Germany after VE-day, returning to the United States on 19 January 1946 for demobilization. It was redesignated a reserve formation on 21 January 1946.

Troops of the 84th Infantry Division liberated two satellite camps of the Neuengamme Concentration Camp: Ahlem (a.k.a. Hannover-Ahlem), on 10 April 1945, and Salzwedel, on 14 April 1945. As such, the 84th is officially recognized as a "Liberating Unit" by both the U.S. Army's Center of Military History and the Holocaust Memorial Museum.

==== Casualties ====
- Total battle casualties: 7,260
- Killed in action: 1,284
- Wounded in action: 5,098
- Missing in action: 129
- Prisoner of war: 749
- Campaigns: Rhineland, Ardennes-Alsace, Central Europe.
- Days of combat: 170.
- Distinguished Unit Citations: 7.
- Awards: Distinguished Service Cross (United States)-12; Distinguished Service Medal (United States)-1; Silver Star-555; LM-4; SM-27; BSM-2,962; AM-59.
- Commanders: Maj. Gen. John H. Hilldring (October 1942 – February 1943), Maj. Gen. Stonewall Jackson (February–October 1943), Maj. Gen. Robert B. McClure (October 1943 – March 1944), Maj. Gen. Roscoe B. Woodruff (March–June 1944), Maj. Gen. Alexander R. Bolling (June 1944 to 1946).

The 84th returned to the US in January 1946 and was inactivated at Camp Kilmer, New Jersey on January 21, 1946

==== Assignments in ETO ====
- 10 September 1944: Ninth Army, ETOUSA.
- 21 September 1944: III Corps.
- 4 November 1944: XIX Corps, Ninth Army, 12th Army Group.
- 8 November 1944: XIII Corps.
- 11 November 1944: Ninth Army, 12th Army Group, but attached for operations to the British XXX Corps, British Second Army, British 21st Army Group.
- 23 November 1944: XIII Corps, Ninth Army, 12th Army Group.
- 20 December 1944: Ninth Army, 12th Army Group, but attached to the XVIII (Abn) Corps of First Army, itself attached to the British 21st Army Group.
- 20 December 1944: VII Corps.
- 22 December 1944: VII Corps, First Army (attached to British 21st Army Group), 12th Army Group.
- 18 January 1945: VII Corps, First Army, 12th Army Group.
- 23 January 1945: XVIII (Abn) Corps.
- 3 February 1945: XIII Corps, Ninth Army (attached to British 21st Army Group), 12th Army Group.
- 4 April 1945: XIII Corps, Ninth Army, 12th Army Group.

=== Cold War to present ===
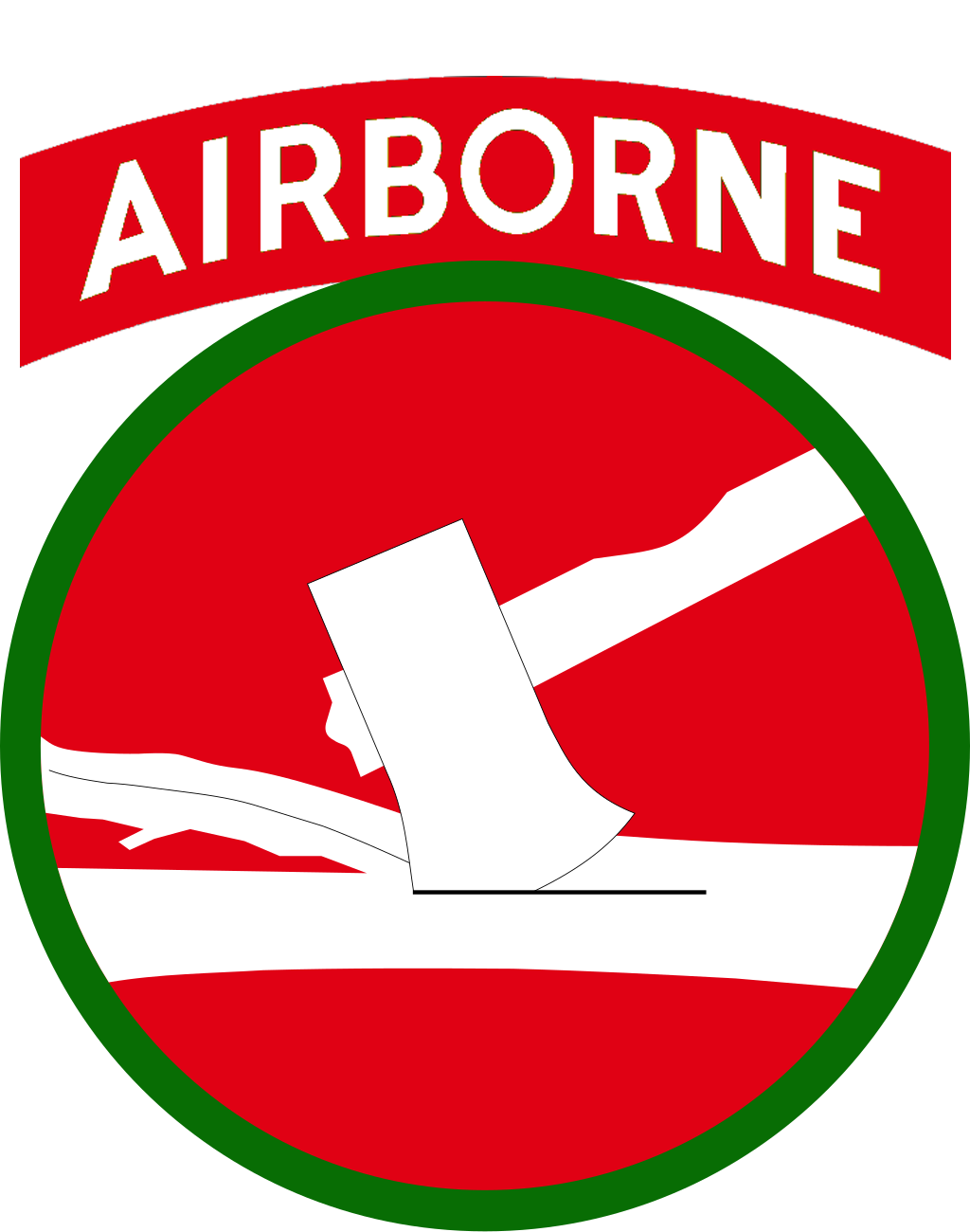
84th Airborne Division SSI

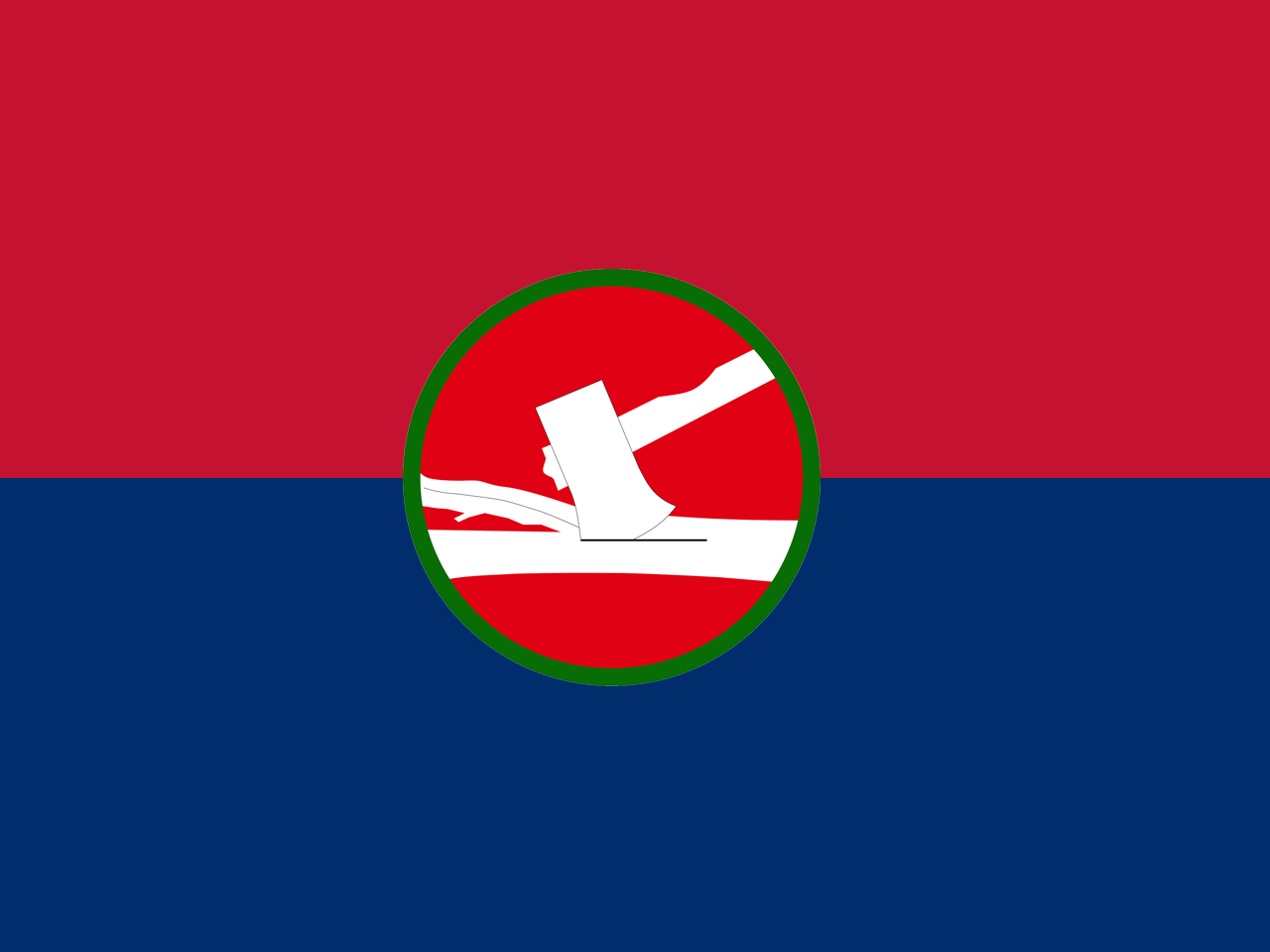
84th Infantry Division Flag

Following the conclusion of World War II, the division was made part of the Army Reserve. In January 1946, it was redesignated the 84th Airborne Division and headquartered out of Wisconsin. In 1947, it was designated as the airborne reserve command for the Army. Five years later, on 1 March 1952, the division was reorganized again, this time as the 84th Infantry Division composed of three regiments—the 274th, 334th, and 339th. In 1959, the division became the 84th Training Division, changing its subordinate units from regiments to brigades and support groups.

On 24 January 1991, elements of the 84th Division (Training) were activated and mobilized for support roles in Operation Desert Storm. Less than three months later, on 22 March 1991, the elements were returned home. In 1993, reorganization within the Army Reserve brought about the merger between the 84th and the 85th Division (Training). The move expanded the 84th Division's area of command to include the rest of Wisconsin and Illinois, as well as all of Missouri and Iowa. Soon after, in June 1994, units from the 84th participated in peacekeeping operations as part of the multinational observer force in the Sinai, Egypt, and remained there until July 1995.

In April 1995, the formation was once more redesignated, this time as an institutional training division. This change brought with it command of units and training in the state of Nebraska. In August 1995, army reorganization further expanded the 84th's range of authority to command the fourteen U.S. Army Reserve Forces Schools in Region E—Wisconsin, Michigan, Minnesota, Illinois, Indiana, and Ohio.

In October 2004, the 84th Division (Institutional Training) underwent a major transformation. All eight brigades realigned under the 100th Division and the Headquarters and Division Band combined with the Army Reserve Readiness Training Center (ARRTC) located at Fort McCoy, Wis., to create the 84th U.S. Army Reserve Readiness Training Command (84th USARRTC). The expertise and resources from the two units gave the 84th USARRTC an edge on the type and amount of training opportunities offered. The three Army Reserve NCO academies were also realigned under the new 84th USARRTC.

In October 2006, the 84th USARRTC underwent another major transformation as 12 brigades from the Army Reserve's Institutional Training Divisions realigned under the command. The brigades were responsible for Officer Education System (OES) training, such as the Combined Arms Exercise (CAX) and Intermediate Level Education (ILE), and Senior Reserve Officer Training Corps (SROTC) support to universities across the country.

In February 2007, the 84th USARRTC was renamed the 84th Training Command (Leader Readiness) in response to the unit's transformation under the Army Reserve's Decision Point 74. The 84th Training Command had exercise command and control over three professional development brigades, one schools brigade, one training development brigade, the 84th Division Band, and eventually the Small Arms Readiness Group.

In September 2008, the 84th Training Command relocated from Milwaukee, Wisconsin and Fort McCoy, Wisconsin to Fort Knox, Kentucky.

In October 2009, the focus of the 84th Training Command shifted from leader readiness to unit readiness. The Army Reserve Readiness Training Center and the three U.S. Army Reserve NCO Academies moved from the umbrella of the 84th and became the 83rd USARRTC which reported directly to the U.S. Army Reserve Command.

In October 2010, the 84th Training Command reorganized to align with the transformation of the Army Reserve. The 84th Training Command is the executing agent of the U.S. Army Reserve's Combat Support Training Programs which includes Warrior Exercises (WAREX), Combat Support Training Exercises (CSTX). The 84th Training Command provides multiple collective training opportunities which prepare units for operational deployments worldwide.

== Organization ==
The 84th Training Command is a subordinate functional command of the United States Army Reserve Command. As of January 2026 the command consists of the following units:

- 84th Training Command, at Fort Knox (KY)
  - Headquarters and Headquarters Battalion, at Fort Knox (KY)
  - 78th Training Division, at Joint Base McGuire–Dix–Lakehurst (NJ)
  - 86th Training Division, at Fort McCoy (WI)
  - 87th Training Division, in Birmingham (AL)
  - 91st Training Division, at Fort Hunter Liggett (CA)
