= Saint Theobald =

Saint Theobald may refer to:

- Theobald of Vienne (c. 927–c. 1001), Archbishop of Vienne
- Theobald of Dorat (990–1070), French canon regular
- Theobald of Provins (1017–1066), French hermit
- Theobald of Marly (died 1247), Cistercian abbot
- Teobaldo Roggeri (1100–1150), Italian shoemaker and porter

== See also ==
- Saint-Thibault (disambiguation)
