= Thibault (disambiguation) =

Thibault is a French personal name and surname.

Thibault may also refer to:

== Places ==
- Saint-Thibault (disambiguation), various places
- Saint-Thibault-des-Vignes, a commune in the Seine-et-Marne department in the Île-de-France region in north-central France
- Thibault, New Brunswick, a Canadian community

== Other uses ==
- The Thibaults (French: Les Thibault), an eight-part serial novel by Roger Martin du Gard
- 1 Thibault Square (the LG Building or the BP Centre), a skyscraper in Cape Town, South Africa
- Thibault, a minor character in the cartoon strip Peanuts
- A pet lobster kept by Gérard de Nerval, French author
