= Sossano =

- Comune
- Comune di Sossano
- Coat of arms

- Location within Italy Location within Veneto
- Coordinates: 45°22′N 11°31′E
- Country: Italy
- Region: Veneto
- Province: Vicenza (VI)
- Frazioni: Colloredo, Pilastro

Government
  - Mayor: Enrico Grandis

Area
  - Total: 20.96 km^{2} (8.09 sq mi)
- Elevation: 19 m (62 ft)

Population (31 December 2015)
  - Total: 4,403
  - Density: 210.1/km^{2} (544.1/sq mi)
- Demonym: Sossanesi
- Time zone: UTC+1 (CET)
  - Summer (DST): UTC+2 (CEST)
- Postal code: 36040
- Dialing code: 0444
- Patron saint: Saint Theobald of Provins
- Saint day: First Sunday in July
- Website: Official website

Sossano is a town and comune in the province of Vicenza, Veneto, north-easternItaly. Via Circonvallazione goes through the town.

The comune of Sossano borders on Agugliaro, Albettone, Campiglia dei Berici, Noventa Vicentina, Orgiano, Poiana Maggiore, San Germano dei Berici and Villaga.
