= Theroigne de Mericourt =

French Revolution organizer (1762–1817)

Théroigne de Méricourt
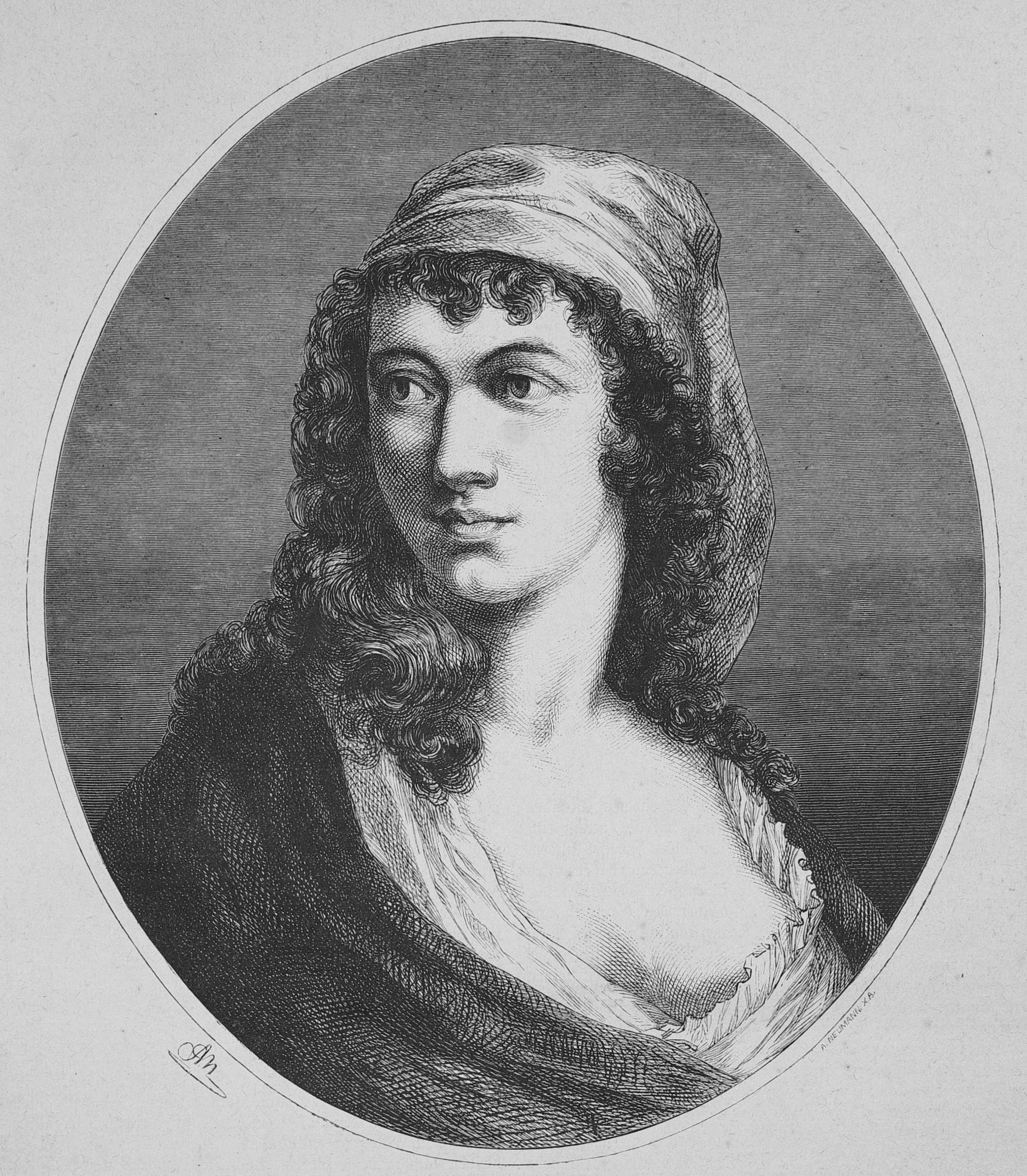
- Born: Anne-Josèphe Terwagne; 13 August 1762; Marcourt, Prince-Bishopric of Liège
- Died: 8 June 1817 (aged 54); Paris, France
- Occupations: Singer; orator; revolutionary
- Parents: Pierre Terwagne; Elisabeth Lahaye
- Relatives: Pierre-Josèphe Terwagne (brother); Josèphe Terwagne (brother)

Anne-Josèphe Théroigne de Méricourt (born Anne-Josèphe Terwagne; 13 August 1762 – 8 June 1817) was a singer, orator and organizer in the French Revolution. She was born at Marcourt, in the Prince-Bishopric of Liège (from which comes the appellation "de Méricourt"), a small town in the modern Belgian province of Luxembourg. She was active in the French Revolution and worked within the Austrian Low Countries to also foster revolution. She was held in an Austrian prison from 1791 to 1792 for being an agent provocateur in Belgium. She was a cofounder of a Parisian revolutionary club and had warrants for her arrest issued in France for her alleged participation in the October Days uprising. She is known both for her portrayal in the French Revolutionary press and for her subsequent mental breakdown and institutionalization.

== Early life (1767–1789) ==
She was born Anne-Josèphe Terwagne in Marcourt, Rendeux, to Pierre Terwagne (b. 1731) and Anne-Élisabeth Lahaye (1732–1767). Her mother died after giving birth to her third child, leaving Anne-Josèphe alone with her father and two brothers; Pierre-Josèphe (b. 1764) and Josèphe (b. 1767). After her mother died, she was sent to live with her aunt in Liège and was put into a convent school where she learned how to sew.

About a year after Anne-Josèphe began school, her aunt married and stopped paying for her school. Anne-Josèphe fled back to her father after he remarried because she was forced to be a house maid and tend to her aunt's children. Life at her father's was no better, her stepmother treated her just as poorly as her aunt did. Her eldest brother went to Germany to stay with relatives by the name of Campinados.

At the age of 13, Anne-Josèphe and her younger brother went to Xhoris to stay with some of their father's relatives. While in Xhoris, she constantly was snubbed and overworked to the point where she could not take it any longer. As a result, she went back to her aunt in Liège, but found that she was still mistreated. After realizing the need to start her own life, she learned to herd cows in Sougné, a town near Limburg.

A year later, she went back to Liège to work as a seamstress, only to face the same discontent with her life as before. She proceeded to seek refuge with a different aunt, by the name of Clamend, who lived in Xhoris. Before long, a woman asked Anne-Josèphe to come to Antwerp with her to care for her daughter, but the woman abandoned her at the inn they were staying at after a few weeks.

Luckily for Anne-Josèphe, a woman by the name of Madame Colbert saw something within her and took her in as the governess to her children. Anne-Josèphe was sixteen when she started living with Madame Colbert; her life consisted of teaching Madame Colbert's children and studying operatic singing in several European capitals. They ended up at Madame Colbert's house in London where eventually a rich Englishman set his eyes on Anne-Josèphe.

One night when Madame Colbert was out, the Englishman entered the home begging for Anne-Josèphe to elope with him. According to her account after she declined, she was abducted and taken by force. When he became of age and inherited his fortune, the unmarried couple went to Paris to live their lives. She quickly caught onto his lavish ways and tried to work with him, but in 1787 he returned to England leaving her in Paris with 200,000 livres.

At some point between 1784 and 1787 she crafted a relationship with 60-year-old Marquis de Persan, a councillor of the Parliament of Paris. Much about their relationship remains a mystery, but what is known is that they communicated through letters, and that he treated her very generously. Anne-Josèphe operated under the alias Mademoiselle Campinado whenever she worked as a courtesan.

After meeting renowned Italian tenor Giacomo David she was inspired to break away from Marquis de Persan and pursue her singing career. She found a noteworthy castrato teacher named Giusto Fernando Tenducci and, because she could not afford the full cost of the lessons, with the help of Tenducci's attorney, they drafted an agreement. She had no idea of Tenducci's plan to scam her out of money so he could pay his debts.

While traveling toward her father, she got news that her father had died and so she was forced to change her plans. Tenducci was not able to execute his plan because she no longer had a reason to visit and drop off a large sum of money. Tenducci proceeded to convince her to travel to Italy with him, her two brothers, and her half brother Pierrot. She was under the impression that she was going to be reimbursed for the travel expenses.

They left for Genoa, Italy, at some point between May 1787 and February 1788. After recognizing his true intentions, she sought help from friends and lawyers who assured her that the contract was invalid. In order to go to Rome as she now desired, Anne-Josèphe needed money. In March 1789, she wrote to Jean-Frédéric Perregaux, a Swiss banker, thanking him for his assistance in acquiring payment from Marquis de Persan, asking for a loan to buy her eldest brother a managership, and requesting letters of recommendation for Rome and Naples.

Rumors about the French revolution began surfacing in Rome. In May 1789, after her younger brother was situated in Rome, she traveled from Italy to Paris, where she became swept up in the early stirrings of the revolution.

== Role in French Revolution (1789–1790) ==
=== King's cockade and National Assembly ===
Anne-Josèphe's first involvement in the revolution was on 17 July 1789 when King Louis XVI was at the Hôtel de Ville, sanctifying the revolution while wearing a tricolored cockade. She dressed in a man's riding habit and a round hat in order to appear as a man to avoid the discrimination faced by women.

On 4 August 1789 she attended an important National Assembly meeting discussing the rapidly spreading revolution. By the end of the month the Declaration of the Rights of Man and of the Citizen was passed. She decided to move to Rue de Noailles in Versailles to ensure that she was able to attend all the National Assembly meetings. She learned as much as she could about the unfolding events like the Women's March on Versailles so she could understand the issues and began to help. In October 1789, she moved to Paris so she could continue to attend the National Assembly meetings.

=== Society of Friends of the Law ===
In January 1790 she founded, along with Gilbert Romme, the Société des amis de la loi ("Society of Friends of the Law"), a club that sought to encourage and assist patriotic work in the provinces. The club was short-lived, and Anne-Josèphe turned her revolutionary zeal into oratory at the Club des Cordeliers and the terraces of the National Assembly. Frustrated by the minimal opportunities available to female patriots, she supported the formation of mixed-sex and women's patriotic clubs. Around this time is when she became known as Théroigne de Méricourt.

=== Rumors from the press ===
Théroigne was beginning to realize that the majority of the supporters of the revolution were interested in the rights of men and not in the rights of women. Beginning in November 1789, the Parisian royalist press began to construct a flamboyant and infamous caricature of Théroigne as a "patriots' whore" and "female war chief." According to the pages of these pamphlets, she assaulted the Bastille and led the October Days march on Versailles; she fought soldiers and was "ever to be found where the unrest was greatest," attired in a "scarlet riding-habit and... black plume." She was portrayed as a shameless libertine who was sexually involved with "Deputy Populus" ("the people") and one tabloid wrote that "every representative [of the National Assembly] may fairly claim to be the father of her child." Even non-French press coming from London portrayed Méricourt in a negative light.

== Austrian imprisonment (1790–1792) ==
In May 1790, impoverished and much affected by the libels of the royalist press, Théroigne left Paris for Marcourt. After a short stay, she proceeded to Liège, in which town she was seized by warrant of the Austrian Government, and conveyed first to Tyrol and thereafter to the Kufstein Fortress, where she was interrogated about her revolutionary activities. She was taken by mercenaries on a 10-day journey to Austria during which she was bullied and nearly raped by her three captors. The Austrians, influenced by Théroigne's portrayal in the Paris tabloids, attributed to her an exaggerated role in the Revolution. They portrayed her as a subversive "Pythia," a possible spy who had corrupted soldiers with inflammatory rhetoric, threatened the royal family, and instigated the October Days.

François de Blanc was appointed by Prince Kaunitz, the Imperial Chancellor, to be Thèroigne's interrogator. After about a month of heavy interrogation, Blanc found that she had no useful information to offer and that many of the rumors regarding her were false. Eventually Blanc grew affectionate of her and arranged for her release after he discovered that she had many health issues, including depression, insomnia, migraines, and coughing of blood.

== Role in the French Revolution cont. (1792–1793) ==
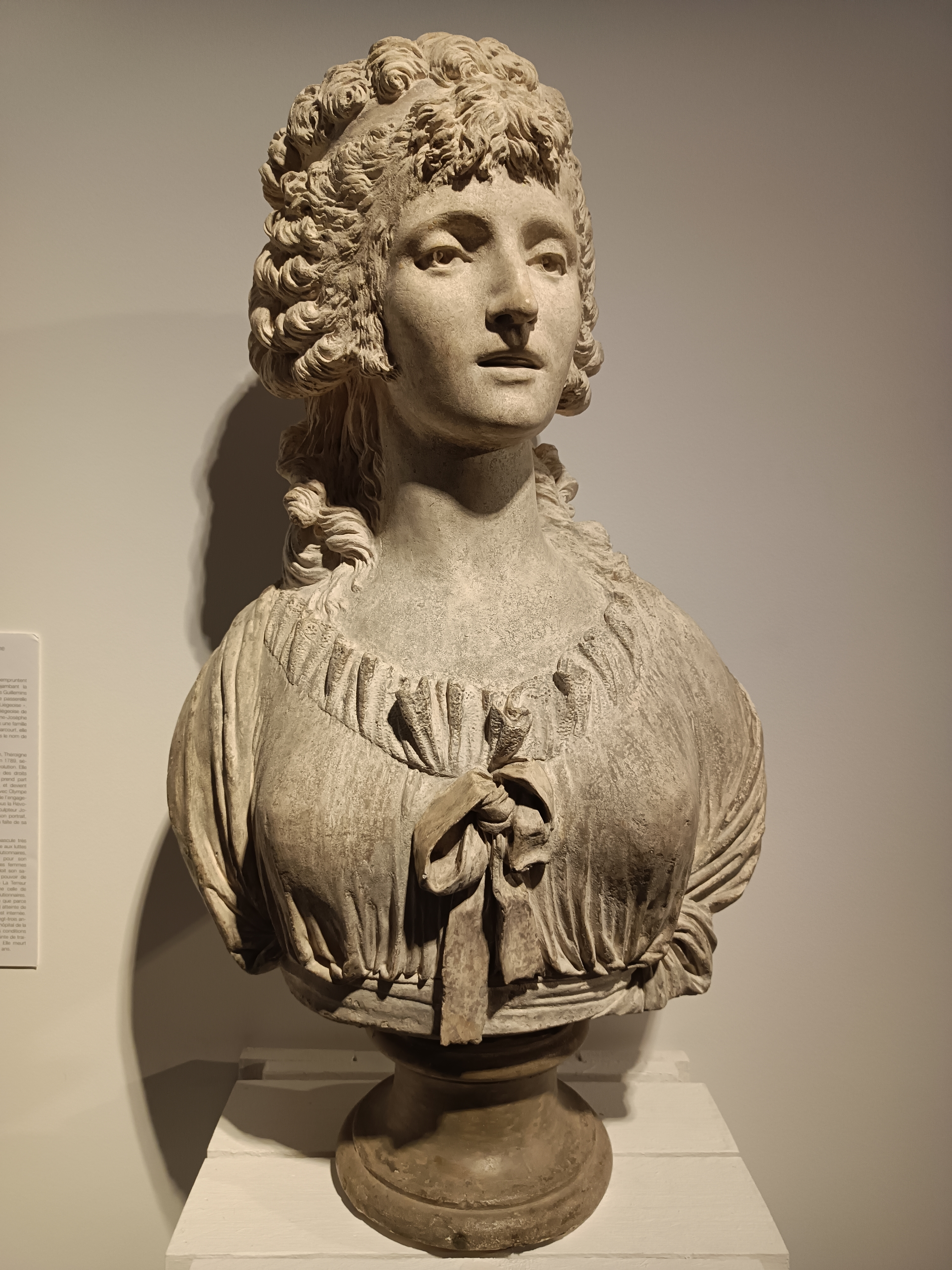
Plaster bust by Joseph Charles Marin sculptured in 1792.

=== Return to Paris ===
In January 1792, Théroigne returned to Paris. News of her Austrian captivity had preceded her, and she was welcomed as a hero. On 1 February, she spoke at the Jacobin Club, where she described her ordeal and was lauded as "one of the first Amazons of liberty." Throughout the spring of 1792, she campaigned for women's rights to bear arms, and in March argued for the establishment of a battalion of women who might defend the city. Her recruiting work for this battalion, however, proved unpopular, and she was denounced to the Jacobins for causing unrest in the Faubourg Saint-Antoine.

During the Demonstration of 20 June 1792, Théroigne was involved in mobilizing the crowds that went on to storm the Tuileries Palace.

=== Tuileries palace ===
During the insurrection of 10 August 1792, Théroigne was involved with the death of royalist prisoners at the Place Vendôme. That Théroigne lynched to death the royalist pamphleteer François-Louis Suleau is not true. She later was awarded a civic crown for her courage on 10 August.

=== Affiliation with the Gironde ===
Théroigne's revolutionary activities remained subdued for the remainder of 1792, but she often was seen at the Jacobins in her riding habit. In early 1793, she composed a series of placards arguing for the active involvement of women in encouraging patriotic duty. Théroigne had, by this point, allied herself with the Girondins, a political faction at odds with the more radical Jacobins.

On 15 May, Théroigne was delivering a speech in the Jardin des Tuileries when she was attacked by a group of women allied with the Jacobins. The women, objecting to her pro-Girondin sentiments, stripped her naked and beat her severely. She was rescued and taken to a hospital in the nearby faubourg Saint-Marceau. It was claimed by some that she was rescued by the intervention of Jean-Paul Marat but this is unclear. Following this ordeal, Théroigne suffered from headaches and mental troubles and spent the remainder of her life institutionalized.

== Institutionalization and death (1794–1817) ==
Théroigne's behavior became erratic, and on 20 September 1794, she was certified insane and put into an asylum in Faubourg Saint-Marceau. She ultimately was sent to La Salpêtrière Hospital in 1807, where she lived for 10 years, intermittently lucid and speaking constantly about the revolution. Following a short illness, she died there on 8 June 1817.

== Fact and fiction in the French Revolution ==
Beginning in November 1789, the Parisian royalist press began to construct a flamboyant and infamous caricature of Théroigne as a "patriots' whore" and "female war chief." According to the pages of these pamphlets, she had assaulted the Bastille and led the October Days march on Versailles; she fought soldiers and was "ever to be found where the unrest was greatest," attired in a "scarlet riding-habit and... black plume." She was also portrayed as a shameless libertine who was sexually involved with "Deputy Populus" ("the people") and one tabloid wrote that "every representative [of the National Assembly] may fairly claim to be the father of her child." The history of this fictional Théroigne came to overshadow and confuse her actual actions during this time. By her own account, she was not present at the fall of the Bastille, nor did she march on Versailles during the October Days; rather, she had lived at Versailles throughout the summer of 1789, attending debates at the National Assembly and meeting with political figures such as Jérôme Pétion, Camille Desmoulins, and the Abbé Sieyès. She did indeed, while at Versailles, dress in a man's riding habit, but she did not lead any insurrectionary actions.

== In popular culture ==
=== Literature ===
- Théroigne de Méricourt appears as a minor character in Hillary Mantel's 1992 novel A Place of Greater Safety.
- The play Théroigne de Méricourt by Paul Hervieu was written in 1902 and was performed by Sarah Bernhardt on 23 September 1902.
- Théroigne de Méricourt appears in Samantha Silva's 2021 novel Love and Fury: A Novel of Mary Wollstonecraft.

=== Video games ===
- In Assassin's Creed Unity (2014), Théroigne de Méricourt appears in several side missions. She is voiced by Natalia Payne.
- In Steelrising (2022), Théroigne de Méricourt appears in the Downloadable content: Steelrising - Cagliostro's Secrets. She is voiced by Lucy Montgomery.
