= Hermitage and chapel of Saint-Thibaut =

Catholic religious site in Rendeux, Belgium

Coordinates: 50°12′36″N 5°31′02″E

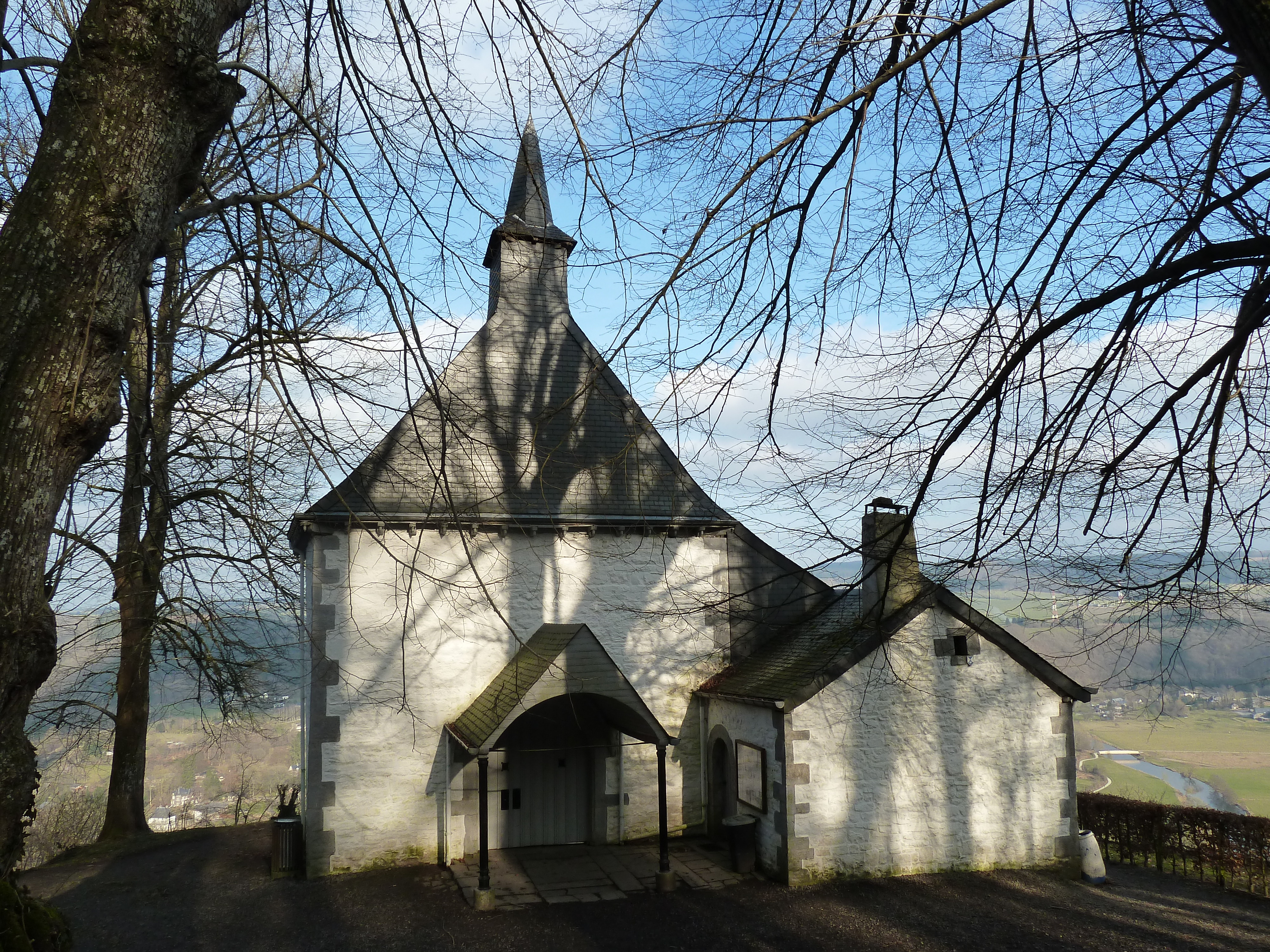
Hermitage and chapel of Saint-Thibaut

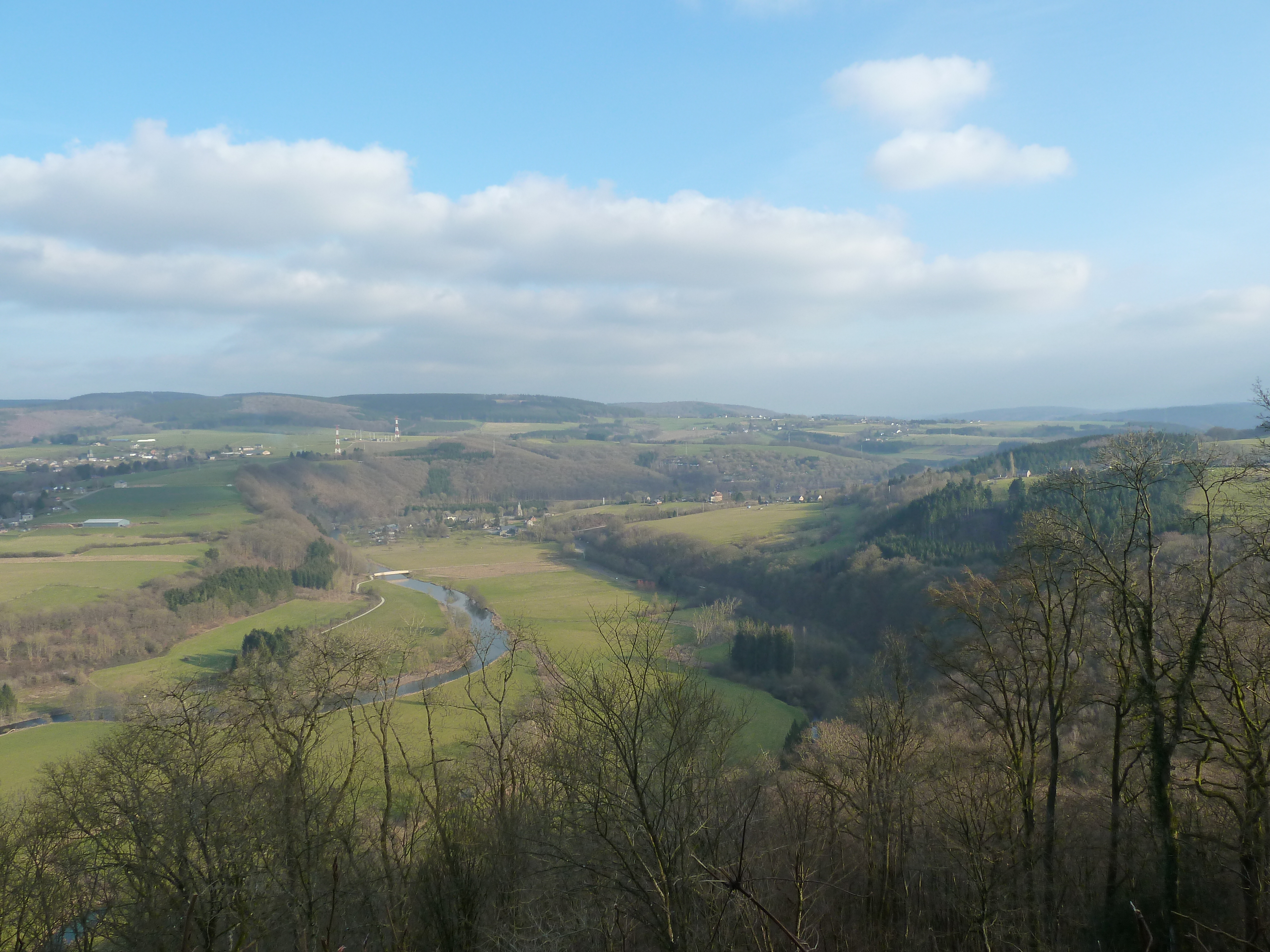
View of the Ourthe river valley from the hermitage and chapel

The Hermitage and Chapel of Saint-Thibaut is a former hermitage and chapel dedicated to Saint Theobald of Provins, in the Belgian municipality of Rendeux. The chapel was built on the site of a ruined medieval castle. It houses a reliquary containing the supposed head of Saint Theobald. A hermit lived on the site until 1968. The chapel and hermitage are today run by a non-profit association, and are occasionally open to the public.

== History ==
The hermitage and chapel are located on a hill overlooking the River Ourthe and opposite the villages of Marcouray and Marcourt. The site has been inhabited since prehistoric times. In 1050, the Counts of Montaigu constructed a castle on the site to serve as the family seat. By 1413, the castle and the county had passed into the hands of the House of La Marck. Following a family dispute that year, the castle was burnt down. Remnants of the castle building are still visible on the site.

About 200 metres (220 yd) from the castle, there is a spring, traditionally dedicated to Saint Theobald of Provins. Following a series of reported miracles, a cross was erected on the hill in 1603, followed by the construction of the chapel in 1639, soon followed by the hermitage. The chapel was built on the site of one of the former castle towers. An elaborate altarpiece was donated to the chapel in 1730 by Jean-Ernest de Loewenstein, of the Löwenstein family. The altar table is older than the chapel and was taken from the ruined castle. The chapel also houses a reliquary containing the supposed head of Saint Theobald and alleged pieces of the True Cross.

A hermit lived on the site until 1968. The last hermit, Jean-Gabriel Lardinois, allegedly lived solely off alms brought by pilgrims.

== Current status ==
The site was taken over by a non-profit association in 1969–1970. In 1973, it became a protected heritage site. In 2020, the caretaking association was endorsed by the Monarchy of Belgium, formally becoming a Royal non-profit association (In French, Royale ASBL Chapelle et Ermitage Saint-Thibaut). The association organises pilgrimages to the chapel twice a year. The chapel is occasionally open to the public, and the site is freely accessible.
