= Roderick Wetherill =

United States Army general (1918–1978)

Roderick Wetherill Sr.
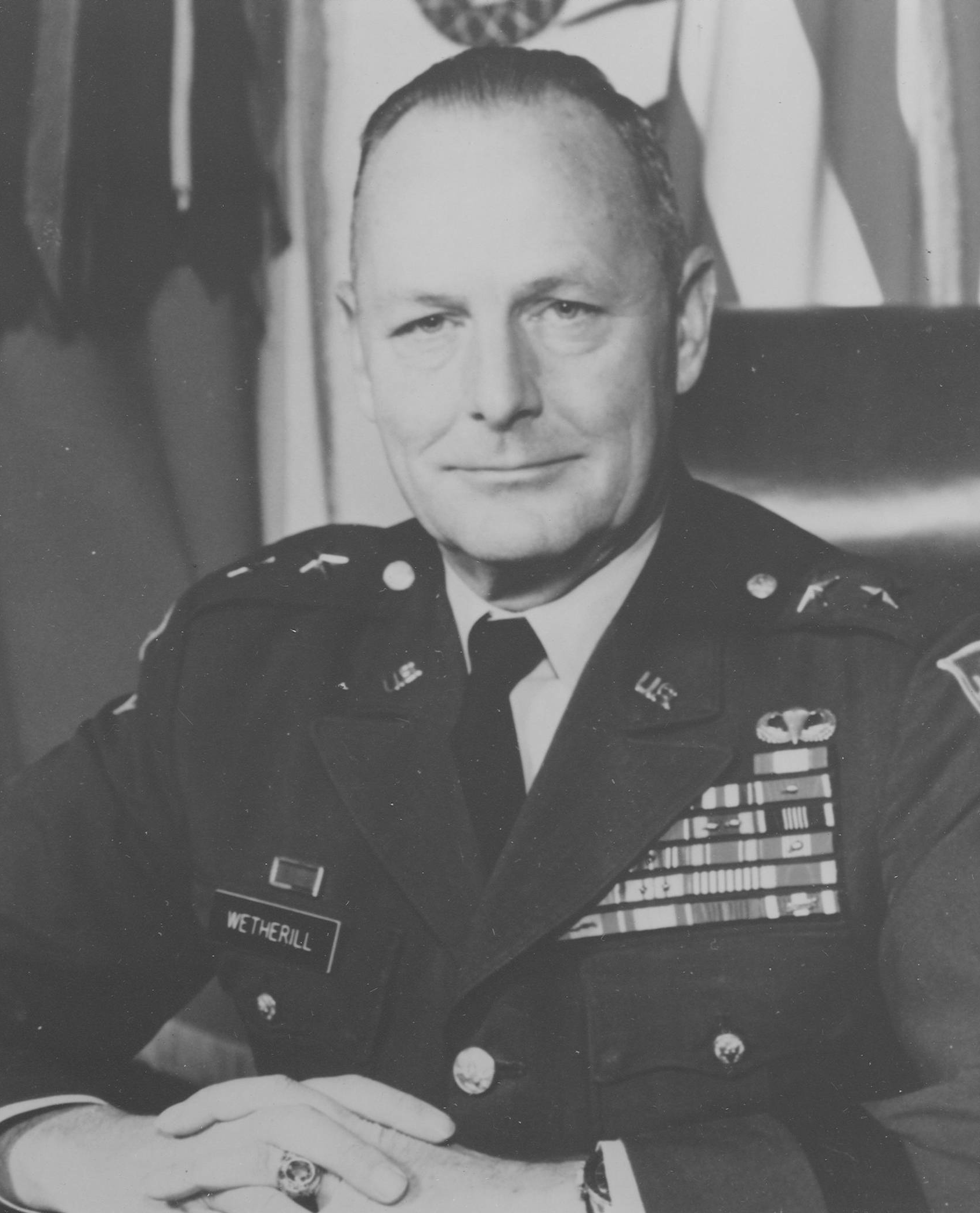
- Wetherhill as commandant of the Field Artillery School c. 1970–1973
- Born: January 19, 1918; Chicago, Illinois, United States
- Died: June 26, 1978 (aged 60)
- Relatives: Alexander R. Bolling (father-in-law); Alexander R. Bolling Jr. (brother-in-law)
- Military career
- Allegiance: United States
- Branch: United States Army
- Service years: 1940–1973
- Rank: Major General
- Nickname: "Rod"
- Service number: 0-23158
- Unit: Field Artillery Branch
- Commands: Fort Sill; 176th Field Artillery Battalion
- Conflicts: World War II; Korean War; Vietnam War
- Awards: Army Distinguished Service Medal; Silver Star; Legion of Merit; Bronze Star (2)

Major General Roderick Wetherill Sr. (January 19, 1918 – June 26, 1978) was a notable officer of the United States Army, serving from World War II through to the Vietnam War. The official Army History of The War in southeast Asia considers him to have been a "key ... commander in Vietnam". He is the son of Richard Wetherill and Elenor Jane Eckerson.

== Education and early career ==
Wetherill graduated from West Point Military Academy in 1940, as had his father and both his sons, Roderick Jr. and Robert Wetherill as well as both grandsons, Chad and Brett Wetherill. While a young Lieutenant, he married Josephine Bolling, in March 1941, at a church in Waban, Massachusetts; his bride was a daughter of Army officer Alexander R. Bolling, who later became a lieutenant general and former Chief of Army Intelligence.

Wetherill was working there at West Point after graduation, and residing in Highland Falls, New York, when his son, Roderick Wetherill Jr., was born on January 20, 1942. His first son was born six weeks after the attack on Pearl Harbor, and the day after his own birthday.

Wetherill was promoted several times during and after World War II. In June 1953, then-Lieutenant Colonel Wetherill took part in a "retrograde movement" at Pukhan River as commander of the 176th Field Artillery Battalion, towards the end of the Korean War. He was awarded the Silver Star and the Legion of Merit for his service. He was "division artillery advisor" at the battle of Pukhan River, and witnessed first-hand the horrible casualties; he said, "I could see by the gun flashes the arms legs and faces hanging all over the wire." He also attempted to save some soldiers from being captured as prisoners of war by the Chinese Army.

From about 1955 to 1957, Wetherill was a colonel stationed at the Headquarters, Continental Army Command. From April 1963 to December 1964, he was chief of staff of V Corps in Germany, at the rank of brigadier general.

== Vietnam War ==
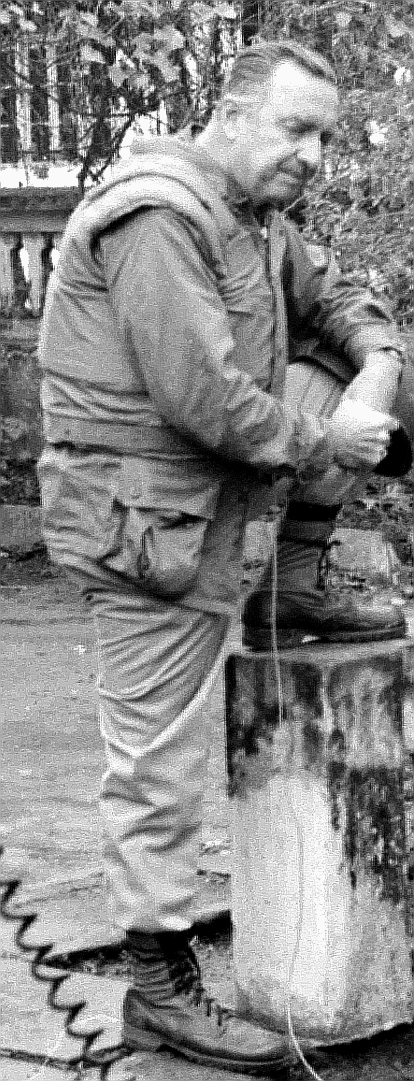
Walter Cronkite reported on location during the Vietnam War.

After a long military career, Wetherill rose to the rank of major general. He was appointed the Senior Advisor, IV Corps, Delta Military Assistance Command on June 1, 1969, and served until February 1970. He advised General Creighton Abrams in June 1969 to transfer certain units of the Army of the Republic of Vietnam out of Saigon to the Mekong delta area to allow them to gain combat experience, but Wetherill's advice was ignored. Just as he feared, the People's Army of Vietnam (PAVN) invaded the Mekong Delta in August 1969. Wetherill was quoted extensively in a nationally syndicated UPI story about the offensive. Specifically, he noted that this was not merely the Viet Cong being involved, but regular enemy troops being engaged for the first time in the area. He famously said about those PAVN troop movements in the Mekong Delta:

I think they came down here to shore up a deteriorating situation. It's an indication of Hanoi's growing concern with what's happening down here.

— Maj. Gen. Roderick Wetherill, August 1969, in Can Tho

In September 1969, Walter Cronkite of CBS News reported that some civilian advisors had also advised withdrawing United States troops; he further quoted Wetherill as describing both the displaced persons there and the withdrawal of American troops.

== Fort Sill ==
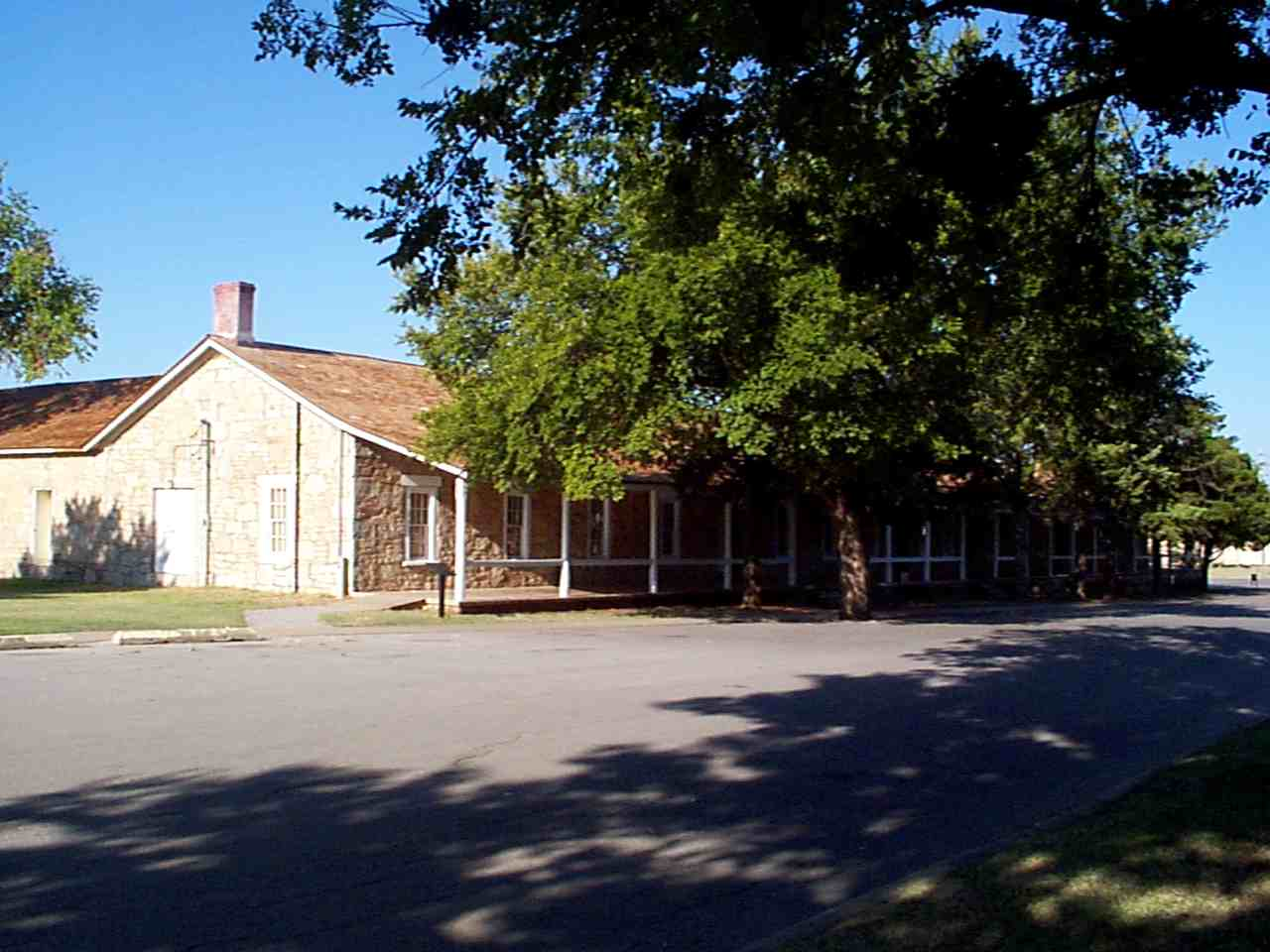
Old infantry barracks at Fort Sill, Comanche County, outside Lawton, Oklahoma.

Wetherill was sent stateside to Fort Sill, which he commanded from February 1970 through the end of May 1973.

As a commanding officer of Fort Sill, and its artillery school during the early 1970s, Wetherill was the named defendant in a famous conscientious objector case during the Vietnam War, Polsky v. Wetherill, 438 F.2d 132 (10th Cir. 1971). The Tenth Circuit decided Polski on jurisdictional grounds, without getting into the merits of the case, while sitting en banc. However, the Supreme Court vacated that judgment in Polsky v. Wetherill, 403 U.S. 916, 91 S.Ct. 2232, 29 L.Ed.2d 693 (1971), and remanded it to the Tenth Circuit for further consideration. On remand, the Tenth Circuit ruled in favor of the petitioner's request for a writ of habeas corpus, and against Wetherill, in Polsky v. Wetherill, 455 F.2d 960 (10th Cir. 1972). Polsky v. Wetherill was cited was precedent ("mandatory authority") in Miller v. United States Army, 458 F.2d 388 (10th Cir. 1972).

Wetherill once sent an enlisted man to psychiatric evaluation, rather than trial, in Lozinski v. Wetherill, 21 USCMA 77, 44 CMR 131 (C.M.A. 1971). In another case, Robertson v. Wetherill, 21 USCMA 77, 44 CMR 131 (C.M.A. 1971), he ordered an enlisted man who was charged with possession of marijuana to face a general, rather than special, court martial.

At Fort Sill, Wetherill also organized the 1970 Field Artillery Systems Review, which aimed for a major "Modernization of the Field Artillery System." He inspected at least two college ROTC units in 1971, including that of Henderson State University in Arkansas.

Major General Wetherill retired from the army on May 31, 1973.

== Awards ==
- Distinguished Service Medal
- Silver Star
- Legion of Merit
- Bronze Star Medal with oak leaf cluster
- Army Commendation Medal
- American Defense Service Medal
- American Campaign Medal
- European-African-Middle Eastern Campaign Medal
- World War II Victory Medal
- Army of Occupation Medal
- National Defense Service Medal
- Korean Service Medal
- Vietnam Service Medal
- United Nations Korea Medal
- Korean War Service Medal
- Republic of Vietnam Campaign Medal

== Promotion dates ==
Rank	Temporary	Permanent
2nd Lieutenant	N/A	11 June 1940
1st Lieutenant	10 October 1941	11 June 1943
Captain	1 February 1942	1 July 1948
Major	9 October 1942	29 August 1952
Lieutenant Colonel	15 June 1944	11 June 1960
Colonel	31 Jan 1955	11 June 1965
Brigadier General	29 August 1963	17 March 1967
Major General	1 July 1969	?
Retired	May 31, 1973

== Writings ==
Wetherill's official papers have been collected, which primarily concern field artillery issues, such as personnel and gunships versus field artillery. He was the editor of the United States Army's monograph about the history of U.S. Field Artillery from 1972 to 1973. His written report to General Frederick C. Weyand on August 31, 1970, about the "Command of I Field Force in Vietnam" was used as a "case study" in "the development of close air support."

== Roderick Wetherill Jr. ==
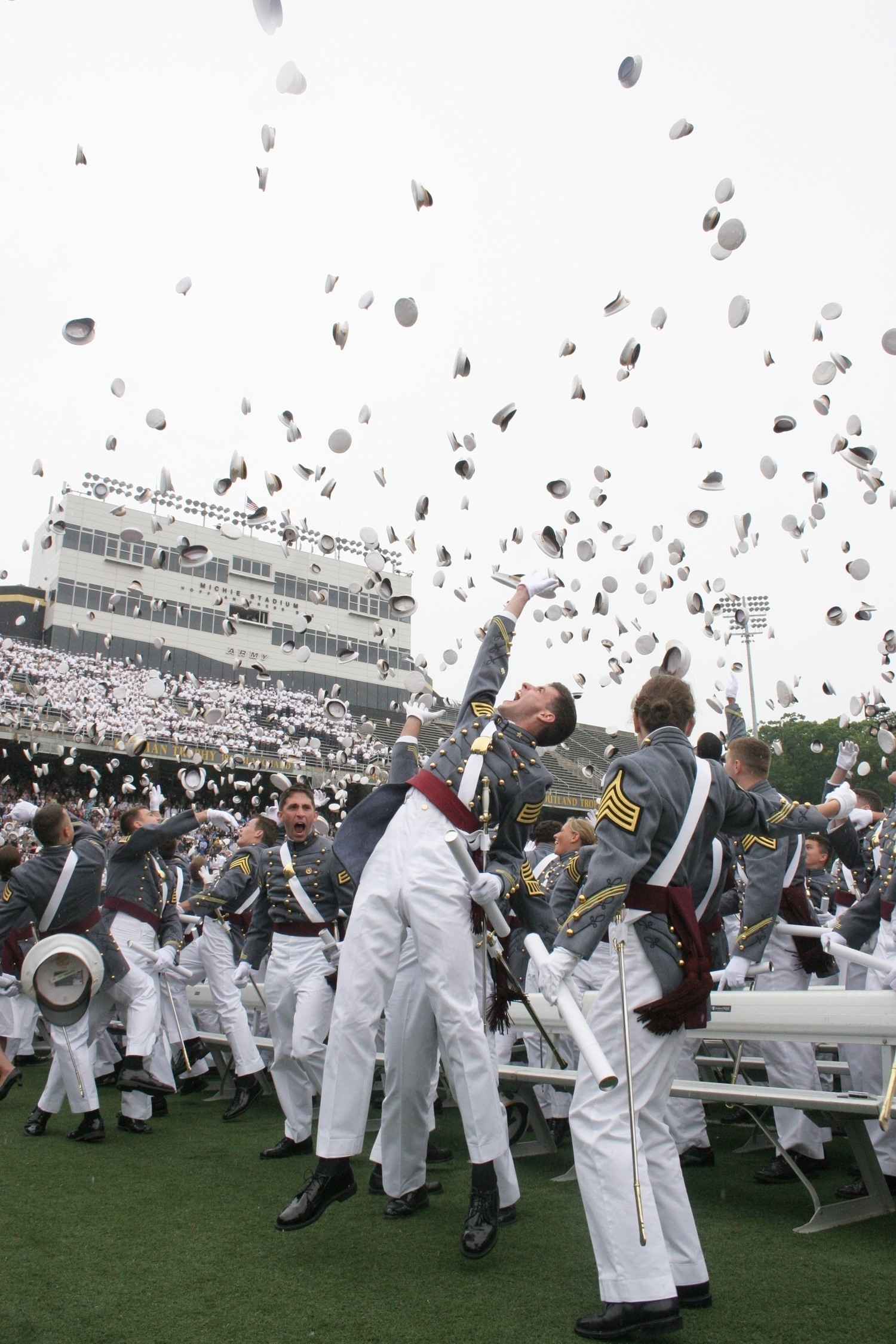
Both Wetherill and his son were graduates of West Point, and wore the famous grey uniform.

Roderick "Rick" Wetherill Jr. (b. January 20, 1942 – September 9, 1996) was an officer of the United States Army from the Vietnam War through the Reagan administration's arms war. He was decorated with several high honors. He was educated at West Point Military Academy, like several of his male relatives, Wetherill Jr. was the son of Wetherill and Josephine Bolling, daughter of army officer Alexander R. Bolling, who later became a lieutenant general and Chief of Army Intelligence. So many of Wetherill's relatives attended West Point—his father, a grandfather, and two uncles among them—that it was said his blood was "grey", which is the color of the uniforms at the military academy. He was raised an army brat in Highland Falls, immediately south of the academy; he was an Eagle Scout and football player at Highland Falls High School and graduated in 1960.

He joined the army, attended their preparatory school, and was class of 1965 at West Point. He also graduated from the Command and General Staff Schools of the army.

Wetherill served first in Germany before 1968, and finished Airborne and Ranger schools. During a tour in the Vietnam War, from 1968 to 1969, he was awarded the Bronze Star Medal and the Republic of Vietnam's Cross of Gallantry.

He earned his Master of Business Administration while an advisor to the ROTC at the University of Arizona (1969–1973). He served with Army Support Group in Panmunjom, South Korea, (1973–1974) the 1st Cavalry Division and as executive officer of the 1st Battalion, 5th Infantry at Fort Hood (1975–1977), CGSC (1977–1979), Individual Training Division at the Pentagon (1979–1982), and Office of the Secretary of Defense (1982–1987), during the Cold War build-up. He retired as a lieutenant colonel. In addition to the Bronze Star Medal and Cross of Gallantry, he earned a Meritorious Service Medal and the Defense Superior Service Medal. He was widely eulogized after his death.
