= Alexander R. Bolling =

United States Army general (1895–1964)

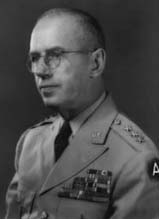
- Lieutenant General Alexander R. Bolling
- Born: August 28, 1895; Philadelphia, Pennsylvania, United States
- Died: June 4, 1964 (aged 68); Satellite Beach, Florida, United States
- Burial place: Arlington National Cemetery, Virginia, United States
- Relatives: Roderick Wetherill (brother-in-law)
- Military career
- Allegiance: United States
- Branch: United States Army
- Service years: 1917–1955
- Rank: Lieutenant General
- Nickname: Beet
- Service number: 0-7548
- Unit: Infantry Branch
- Commands: Third United States Army; 84th Infantry Division
- Conflicts: World War I World War II: Operation Overlord; Battle of the Bulge
- Awards: Distinguished Service Cross; Army Distinguished Service Medal (2); Silver Star; Legion of Merit; Bronze Star Medal; Purple Heart

Alexander Russell Bolling (August 28, 1895 – June 4, 1964) was a lieutenant general in the United States Army during World War II and the Cold War.

== Military career ==
On a break from the Potsdam Conference, President Harry S. Truman strides along inspecting a line of G.I.'s of the 84th Infantry Division at Weinheim (50 miles S of Frankfurt, Germany), July 26, 1945. Stood behind him is the division's commander, Major General Alexander R. Bolling.

Bolling was a student at the United States Naval Academy at Annapolis from 1915 to 1916, but he left the academy and enlisted in the United States Army. He was sent to France during World War I, where he earned a battlefield commission. While in command of a company of the 4th Infantry, 3rd Division, in the Boise-des-Nesles, on the night of July 14, 1918, Second Lieutenant Bolling earned the Distinguished Service Cross, the citation reading:

The President of the United States of America, authorized by Act of Congress, July 9, 1918, takes pleasure in presenting the Distinguished Service Cross to Second Lieutenant (Infantry) Alexander Russell Bolling (ASN: 0-7548), United States Army, for extraordinary heroism in action while serving with 4th Infantry Regiment, 3d Division, A.E.F., in Bois-de-Nesles, France, July 14–15, 1918. While in command of three widely separated platoons in the Bois-de-Nesles, on the night of July 14–15, Lieutenant Boiling continually exposed himself to very heavy gas and shell fire by going from one platoon to another.

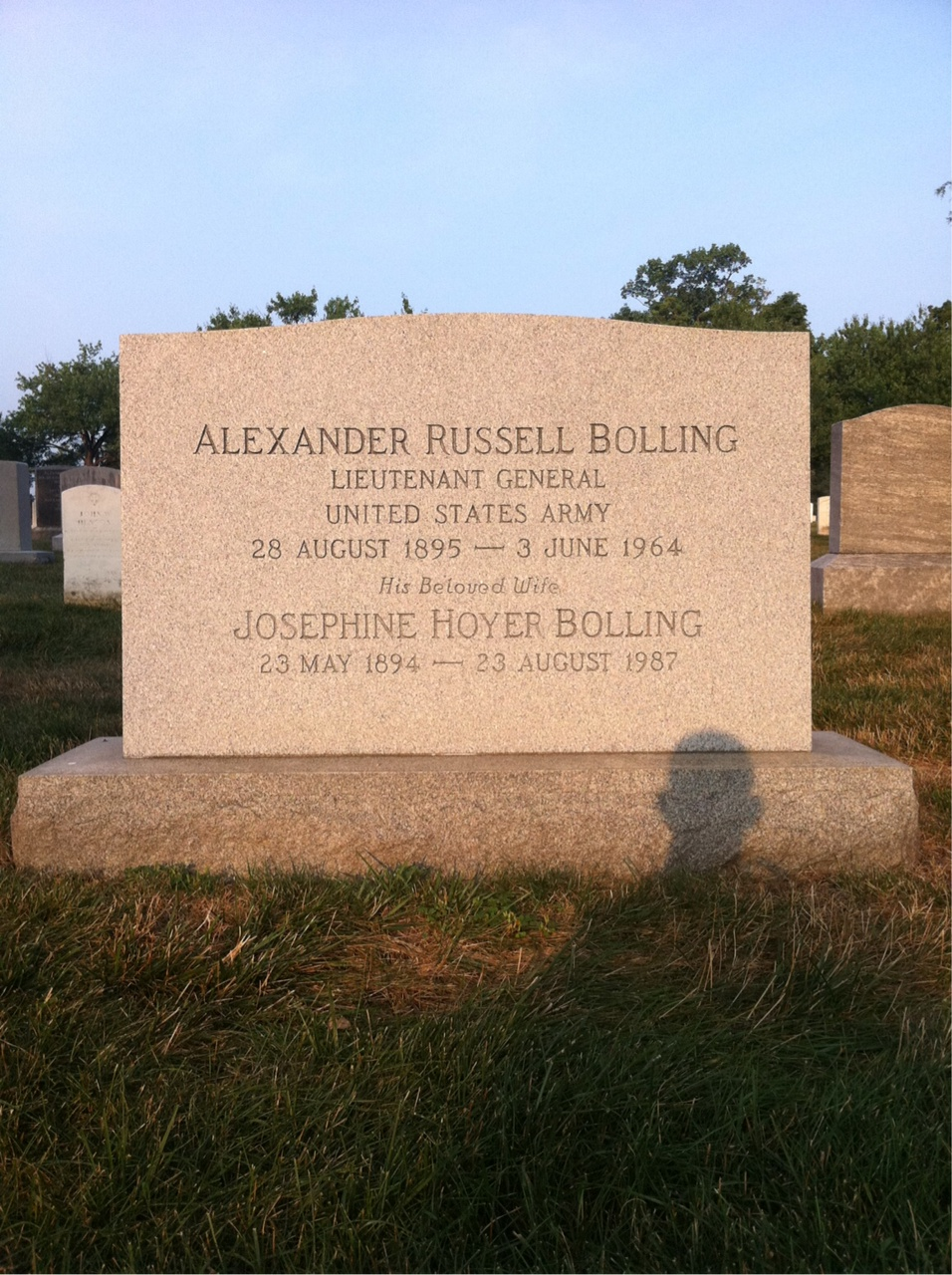
The grave of Lieutenant General Alexander R. Bolling at Arlington National Cemetery.

Prior to World War I, Bolling was sent to Fort Bliss, Texas, where he chased Mexican Bandit Pancho Villa along with fellow Lt. George S. Patton. He was promoted to the rank of captain, which he held for 12 years.

Bolling commanded the 84th Infantry Division in the European Theater of Operations during World War II. After the war, Bolling was promoted to lieutenant general in 1952 and assumed command of the Third United States Army.

== Personal ==
Bolling's awards included the Distinguished Service Cross, Army Distinguished Service Medal with oak leaf cluster, Silver Star, Legion of Merit, Bronze Star Medal, Purple Heart and the Order of the Red Banner and the Order of the Patriotic War First Class from the Union of Soviet Socialist Republics.

Upon his retirement in 1955, Bolling made his home in Satellite Beach, Florida. He died on June 4, 1964, and was buried in Arlington National Cemetery.

Bolling was the father of Major General Alexander R. "Bud" Bolling Jr., the father-in-law of Major General Roderick Wetherill and Lieutenant Colonel C.L. Thomas, and grandfather of Lieutenant Colonel Roderick Wetherill Jr.
