= Rendeux =

Municipality in Wallonia, Belgium

Rendeux Rindeu (Walloon)
- Municipality
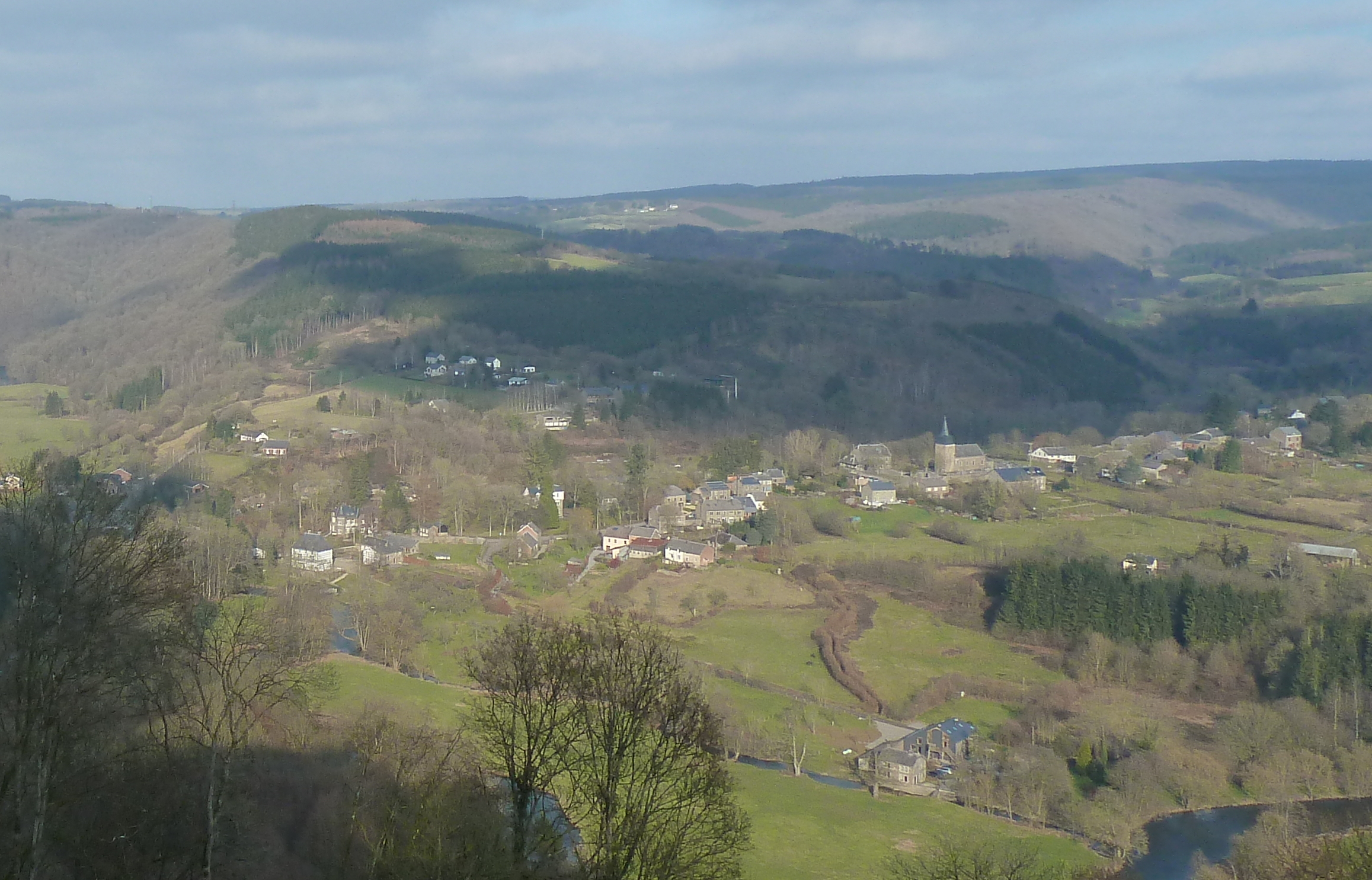
- View of Marcourt, Wallonia

- Flag Coat of arms

- Location of Rendeux in Luxembourg province
- Interactive map of Rendeux
- Location in Belgium
- Coordinates: 50°14′N 05°30′E
- Country: Belgium
- Community: French Community
- Region: Wallonia
- Province: Luxembourg
- Arrondissement: Marche-en-Famenne

Government
  - Mayor: Cédric Lerusse
  - Governing party: Gestion Citoyenne (GC)

Area
  - Total: 69.23 km^{2} (26.73 sq mi)

Population (2018-01-01)
  - Total: 2,582
  - Density: 37.30/km^{2} (96.60/sq mi)
- Postal codes: 6987
- NIS code: 83044
- Area codes: 084
- Website: www.rendeux.be

Rendeux (French pronunciation: [ʁɑ̃dø]; Walloon: Rindeu) is a municipality of Wallonia located in the province of Luxembourg, Belgium.

On 1 January 2007 the municipality, which covers 68.83 km^{2}, had 2,274 inhabitants, giving a population density of 33 inhabitants per km^{2}.

The municipality consists of the following districts: Beffe, Hodister, Marcourt, Wallonia, and Rendeux.

The village of Rendeux lies in the valley of the River Ourthe in an area which attracts visitors both for its natural environment (Rendeux is home to the Robert Lenoir Arboretum) and for such nearby medieval villages as La Roche and Durbuy. The Hermitage and chapel of Saint-Thibaut is located in Rendeux on a hill overlooking the Ourthe river valley.

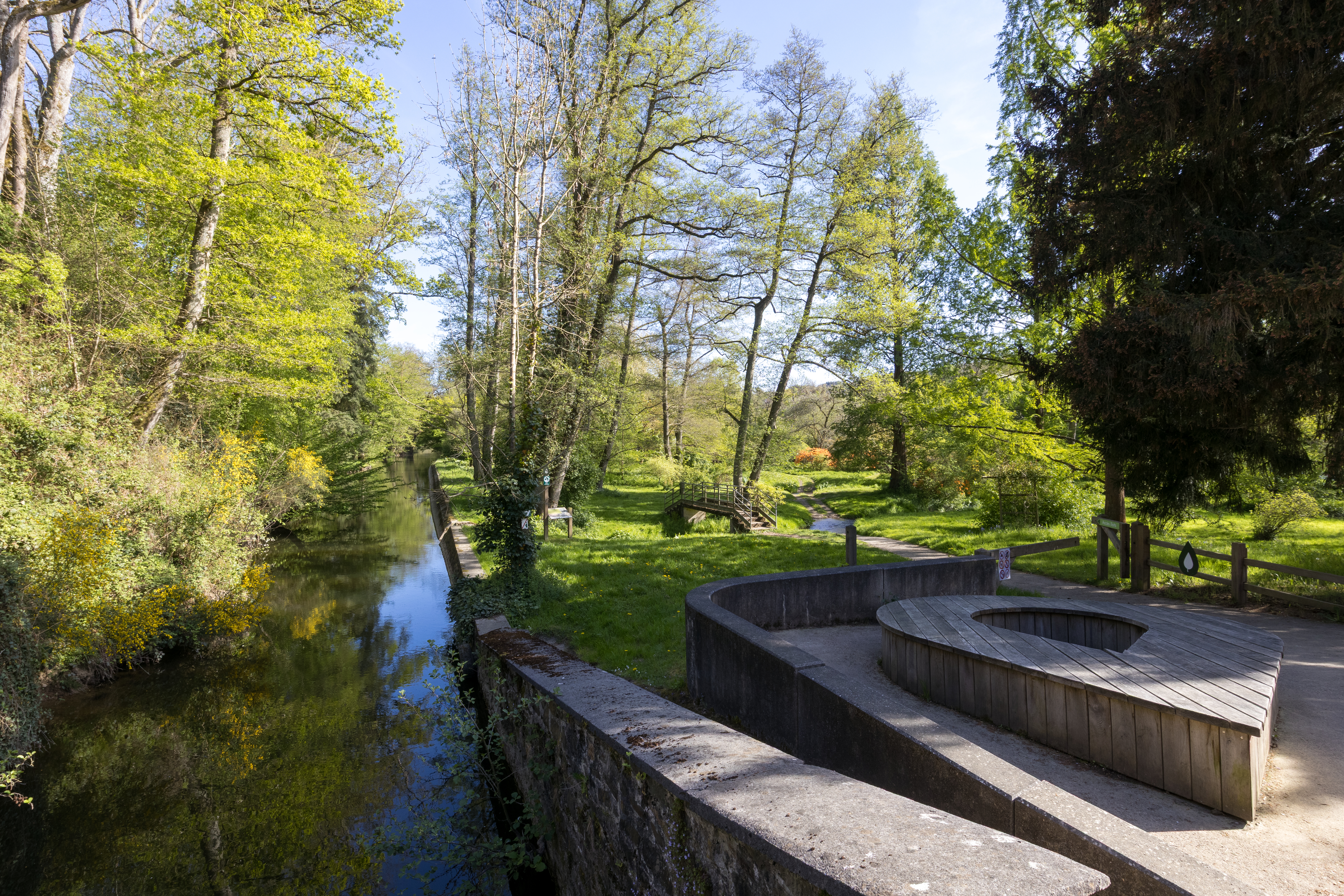
The Robert Lenoir Arboretum

== Notable residents ==
- Théroigne de Mericourt (1762–1817), singer and revolutionary, born in Marcourt
