= Saint-Thibault =

Saint-Thibault may refer to the following places in France:

- Saint-Thibault, Aube, a commune in the department of Aube
- Saint-Thibault, Cher, a village in the commune of Saint-Satur in the department of Cher
- Saint-Thibault, Côte-d'Or, a commune in the department of Côte-d'Or
- Saint-Thibault, Oise, a commune in the department of Oise
- Saint-Thibault-des-Vignes, a commune in the department of Seine-et-Marne
