= Saint-Thibault, Côte-d'Or =

Saint-Thibault
- Commune
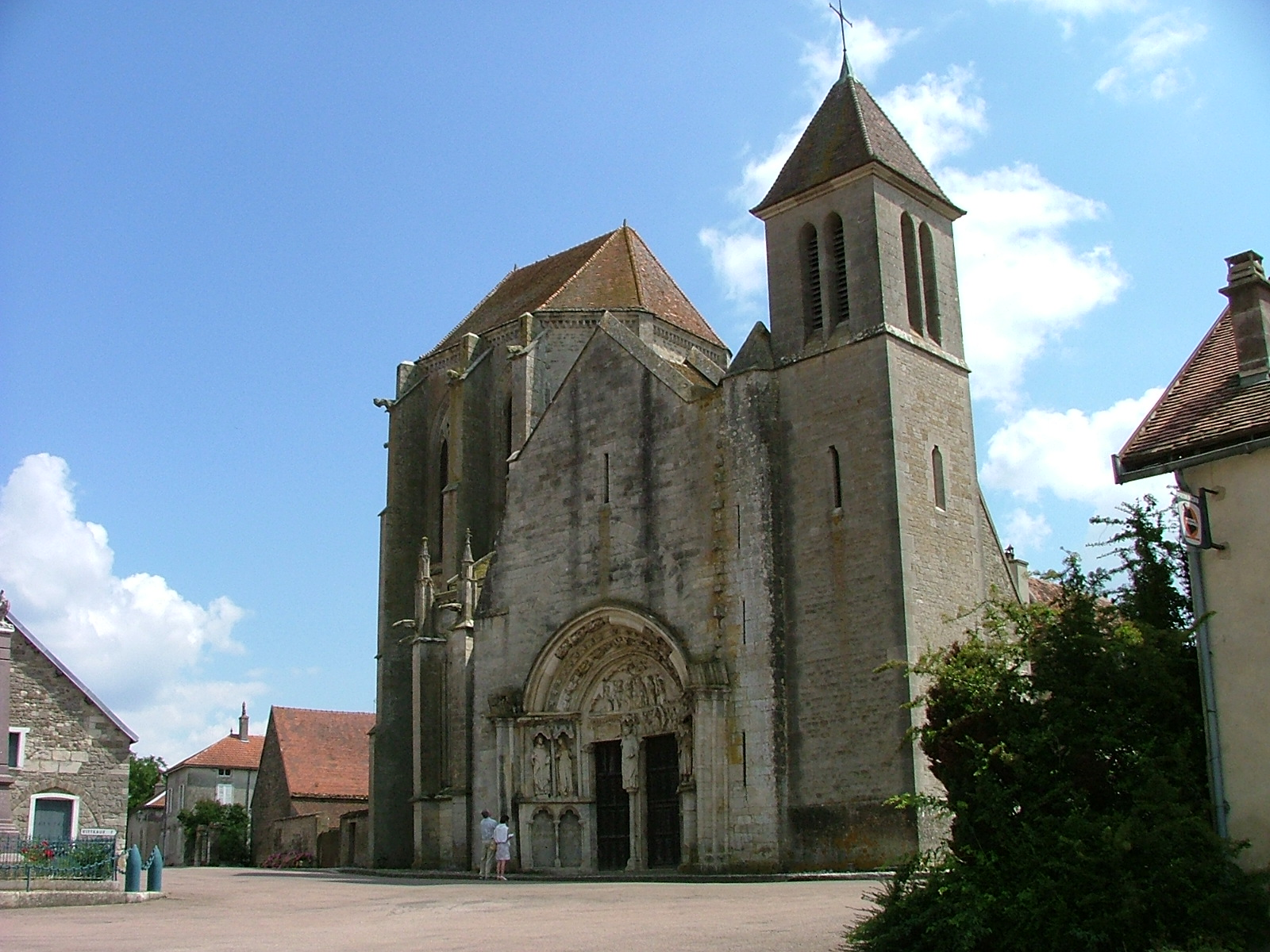
- The church in Saint-Thibault
- Location of Saint-Thibault
- Location within France Location within Bourgogne-Franche-Comté
- Coordinates: 47°22′26″N 4°28′23″E
- Country: France
- Region: Bourgogne-Franche-Comté
- Department: Côte-d'Or
- Arrondissement: Montbard
- Canton: Semur-en-Auxois

Government
  - Mayor (2020–2026): Raymond Lechenault
- Area^{1}: 12.35 km^{2} (4.77 sq mi)
- Elevation: 368 m (1,207 ft)
- Highest elevation: 450 m (1,480 ft)
- Lowest elevation: 328 m (1,076 ft)
- Population (2023): 152
  - Density: 12.3/km^{2} (31.9/sq mi)
- Time zone: UTC+01:00 (CET)
  - Summer (DST): UTC+02:00 (CEST)
- INSEE/Postal code: 21576 /21350
- ^{1} French Land Register data, which excludes lakes, ponds, glaciers > 1 km^{2} (0.386 sq mi or 247 acres) and river estuaries.

Saint-Thibault (French pronunciation: [sɛ̃ tibo]) is a commune in the Côte-d'Or department in France.

It is in the canton of Semur-en-Auxois, at an altitude of about 366 metres (1,201 ft) near the communes of Beurizot and of Normier. The river Armançon and the Canal de Bourgogne pass through the commune.

The parish church, Église Saint-Thibault, dates from the 13th-17th century. The church was part of the Priory of Saint-Thibault, that once held the relics of Saint Theobald of Provins.

== Population ==
Historical population
Year	Pop.	±% p.a.
1968	181	—
1975	161	−1.66%
1982	144	−1.58%
1990	142	−0.17%
1999	138	−0.32%
2007	142	+0.36%
2012	162	+2.67%
2017	164	+0.25%
2023	152	−1.26%
Source: INSEE

== See also ==
- Communes of the Côte-d'Or department
