= Officer Education System =

The Officer Education System (OES) is the progressive and sequential education and training process for officers in the United States Army that begins in the pre-commissioning phase and continues in schools through the basic entry level, advanced level, intermediate command and staff level, and senior level. The OES offers the following educational opportunities:

- Basic Officer Leader Course: A two-phased program of pre-appointment/pre-commissioning and initial entry training which develops junior officers into leaders who are competent, confident, imbued with the Warrior Ethos, and who are grounded in field craft, proficient in branch skills, and capable of leading small units.
- Warrant Officer Advanced Course: A course that provides leader, tactical, and technical training needed by warrant officers to serve in company and higher-level positions.
- Captains Career Course: This course prepares company grade officers to successfully command at the company level and serve effectively in staff positions at the battalion and brigade level.
- Warrant Officer Staff Course: A course that focuses on the staff officer and leadership skills needed to serve in the grade of Chief Warrant Officer (CWO) at battalion and higher levels.
- Intermediate Level Education: This school replaced the Command and General Staff Officer Course and ensures majors are better prepared for full-spectrum operations in Joint, interagency, and multinational environments.
- School of Advanced Military Studies: Educates officers at the graduate level in military art and science to develop commanders and general staff officers who can solve complex military problems in peace and war. The focus of this school is on planning and executing full-spectrum operations in Joint, multinational, and interagency contexts.
- School for Command Preparation: Provides focused leader development opportunities for incoming brigade and battalion commanders and command sergeants major.
- Warrant Officer Senior Staff Course: Designed to produce warrant officers with the broader Army perspective required for assignment to CW5 level positions as technical, functional and branch systems integrators and trainers at the highest organizational levels.
- Senior Service College: Prepares selected senior Army officers and Civilians, and international leaders for the responsibilities of strategic leadership.
