= Theobald of Provins =

French hermit-saint

Saint Theobald of Provins OSB Cam
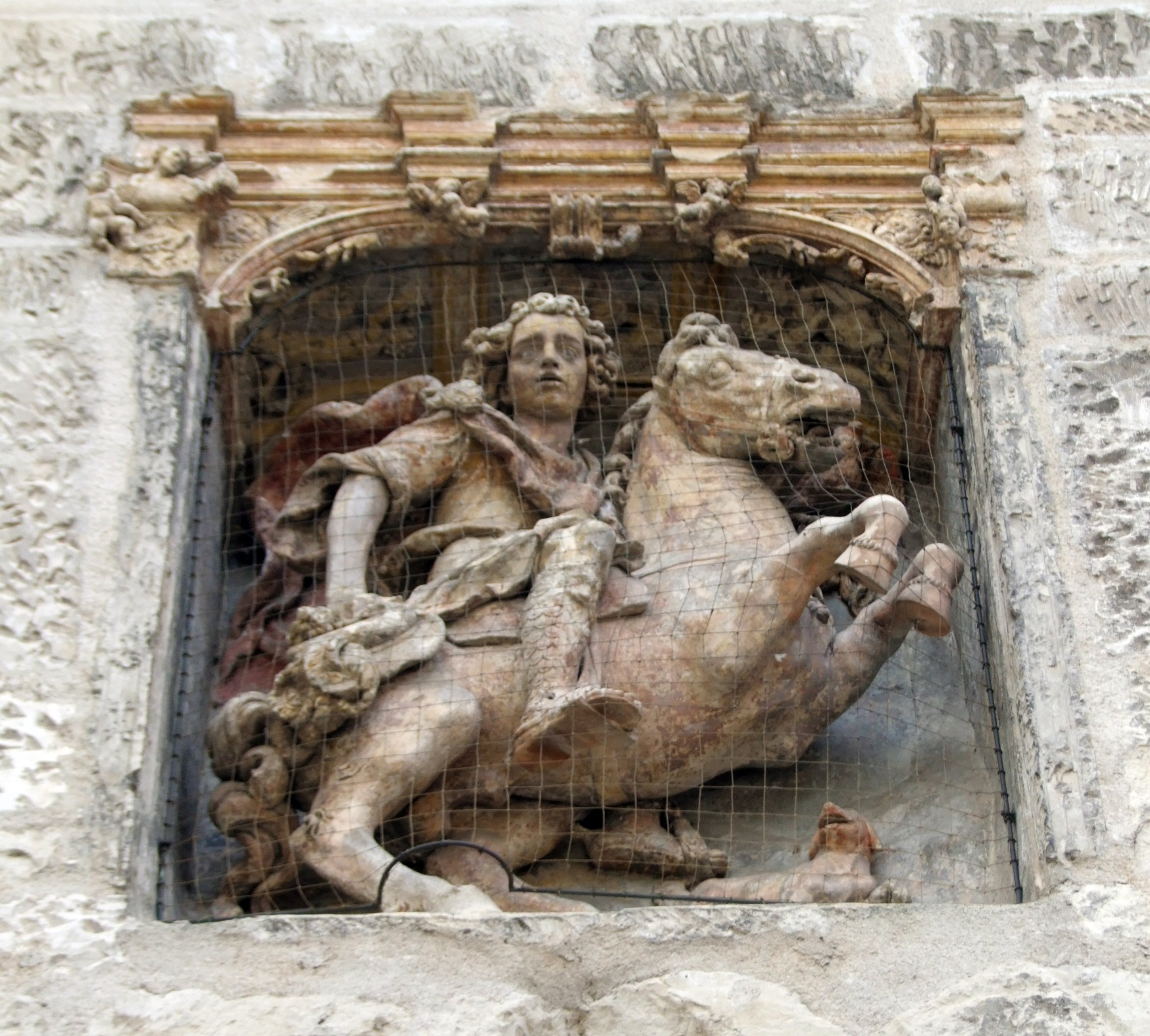
- Equestrian statue of St. Theobald by Jean de Joigny (Church of Saint-Thibault de Joigny).
- Born: 1033; Provins, County of Champagne
- Died: June 30, 1066; Sajanega, County of Sossano
- Venerated in: Roman Catholic Church (Provins & Camaldolese Order); Eastern Orthodox Church
- Canonized: 1073, Rome, Papal States, by Pope Alexander II
- Feast: June 30
- Attributes: depicted as a hermit or as a knight
- Patronage: Provins; farmers; winegrowers; shoemakers; beltmakers;> charcoal-burners; bachelors; invoked against fever; afflictions associated with the eyes; dry cough; infertility

Theobald of Provins (French: Saint Thibaut, Thibault, Thiébaut) (1033–1066) was a French hermit and saint.

== Biography ==
He was born at Provins to the French nobility, his father being Arnoul, Count of Champagne. He was named after his uncle, Theobald of Vienne, also considered a saint.

As a youth, Theobald admired the lives of hermits such as John the Baptist, Paul the First Hermit, Anthony the Abbot and Arsenius the Great. He would visit a local hermit named Burchard, who lived on an island in the Seine.

Theobald refused to get married or to begin a career either in the army or at court. When war broke out between his cousin Odo II, Count of Blois, and Conrad the Salic over the Burgundian crown, Theobald refused to lead troops to help his cousin and convinced his father to let him become a hermit.

Theobald left home with a friend named Walter to become a hermit at Suxy in the Ardennes. They then traveled to Pettingen, where they worked as day laborers.

The two friends became pilgrims on the Way of St. James and afterwards returned to the Diocese of Trier. They then made a pilgrimage to Rome and planned to go to the Holy Land by way of Venice. However, Walter fell ill near Salanigo, near Vicenza, where they decided to settle. After Walter died, Theobald joined a group of hermits who had gathered in the area under the guidance of the founder of the Camaldolese, Romuald. The Bishop of Vicenza eventually ordained Theobald a priest. His background, however, was soon discovered and his parents came to visit him.

Theobald's mother, Gisela, received the permission of her husband to stay with their son and became a hermit herself near this place of retreat. Theobald died from an illness in which the skin of every limb was covered over in blotches and ulcers.

Shortly before he died, Theobald made his profession of religious vows to the prior of his Camaldolese community, who had been summoned for this purpose when it was realized how close Theobald was to death.

== Veneration ==
Theobald died in Sossano on June 30, now his feast day, in A.D. 1066. His relics were translated to a monastery nears Sens, and then to Auxerre, at the Priory of Saint-Thibault-en-Auxois, Côte-d'Or.

Theobald was canonized in 1073 by Pope Alexander II. Numerous miracles, some occurring before and some after his death, are reported of him. His cult is centered on Provins and Saint-Thibault-en-Auxois, where the Cluniac priory had some of his relics. He is the patron saint of charcoal-burners.

A reliquary allegedly containing the skull of Saint Theobald is housed in the hermitage and chapel of Saint-Thibaut in Belgium.
