= Beffe =

Village in southern Belgium

Coordinates: 50°15′N 5°31′E

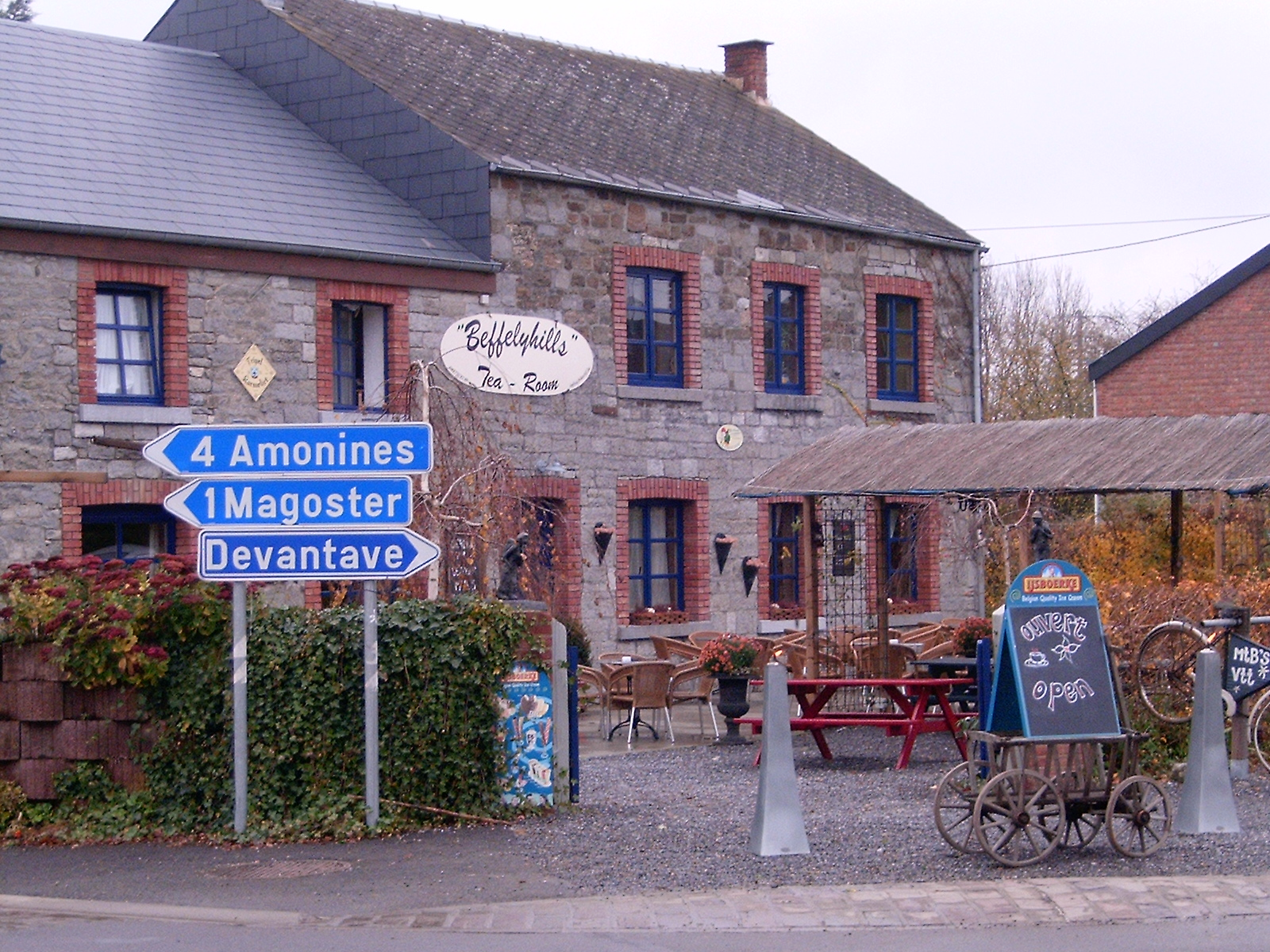
Lunchroom in Beffe

Beffe (French pronunciation: [bɛf]; Walloon: Bêfe) is a village of Wallonia and a district of the municipality of Rendeux, located in the province of Luxembourg, Belgium.

The Ourthe river flows alongside Beffe.
