= Louis-Félix Guinement de Kéralio =

French soldier, writer and academic (1731–1793)

- Born: 14 September 1731; Rennes, France
- Died: 10 December 1793 (aged 62); Groslay, France
- Political party: Patriotic (1789–1791)
- Spouse: Françoise Abeille
- Children: Louise-Félicité de Kéralio
- Relatives: Auguste de Keralio (brother); Agathon Guinement (brother); Alexis (brother)
- Awards: Order of Saint Louis

Louis-Félix Guinement, chevalier de Kéralio (14 September 1731, Rennes – 10 December 1793, Groslay) was a French soldier, writer and academic. He married Françoise Abeille and their daughter was the feminist writer Louise-Félicité de Kéralio.

== Life ==
=== Military career ===
He joined his brothers Auguste, Agathon and Alexis in the régiment d'infanterie d’Anjou as a lieutenant on 8 March 1746, aged 14. During the War of the Austrian Succession, he participated in 1746 in the siege of Tortone, the Battle of Piacenza and the Battle of Tidone on 10 August. His extraordinary valour at Tidone twice threw the Austrians, who wanted to bar the river crossing to the French, into disorder. In 1747 he fought in the attack on the fortifications at Montauban and Villefranche, then in the capture of Montauban, Nice, Villefranche and Vintimille.

Louis Félix Guynement was demobbed in 1749. Nevertheless, he decided to serve at his own expense in the regiment for 18 months, being recalled to it officially in 1751, before being made aide-major. In 1754 and 1755 he was put in sole charge of the regiment's manoeuvres and exercises, and in 1755 he was made captain. At the start of the Seven Years' War onwards he was retired from the ranks after being wounded when the regiment was encamped in observation at Calais in 1756 and retired to his birthplace of Valence.

Louis-Félix was appointed Deputy Director of Studies and Professor of Tactics at the Royal Military School in Paris on 25 February 1758. On 31 July 1759, Louis Félix was appointed aide-major of the military school then he was promoted to major. He taught many future generals of the Revolutionary and Napoleonic Wars, such as Armand Samuel de Marescot, Louis-Alexandre Berthier and Jean-Baptiste Bernard Viénot de Vaublanc.

In 1759, he was appointed general assistant of the infantry and became the aide-de-camp of Maréchal de Broglie during the military campaigns in Germany of 1760 and 1761. In this post, he proposed to Maréchal de Broglie that the death penalty be abolished for army marauders and to replace it with softer but systematically applied sentences.

On 21 May 1771, Louis Félix was made Knight of the Royal and Military Order of Saint-Louis. He was reformed from the military school in 1778.

During the French Revolution, Louis Félix was elected the first commander of the 3rd Battalion of the National Guard - Battalion of the Filles-Saint-Thomas. He was the commander from its inception on 16 July 1789 and remained as its head until the end of the following year when he retired due to illness. The second battalion commander was Gabriel Tassin de l'Etang.

As the head of the Battalion of the Filles-Saint-Thomas, he reestablished order in the Hôtel de Ville in Paris on October 5, 1789.

He was appointed member of the war committee of the National Convention in 1792.

=== Academic career ===
He was elected a foreign member of Sweden's Royal Academy of Sciences in Stockholm early in 1774. On 28 April 1780, he was also elected an academician of the Académie des Inscriptions et Belles-Lettres de Paris, replacing Paul-Gédéon Joly de Maïzeroy who died on 7 February 1780.

Around 1780, the chevalier de Keralio and the editor Panckoucke signed a contract to edit 4 volumes on "Art militaire" in the Encyclopédie Méthodique, published from 1784 to 1787, for which he wrote a preliminary discourse and several articles. From 1784 he wrote for the Journal des Savants.

It is for the Académie des inscriptions et belles-lettres that he is a member of the competition jury in April 1790 as director of the institute for the deaf and the blind after the death of Abbé de l'Epée. The jury includes Abbé Barthélemy, La Harpe, Marmontel, and Condorcet. The jury proposes Abbé Sicard to Louis XVI.

He contributed to the newspapers edited by his daughter, Louise-Félicité de Kéralio, from 13 August 1789. A member of the Patriotic Society and not adhering to the radicalization of his daughter's ideas, he stopped his political collaboration after the Champ-de-Mars massacre on 17 July 1791.

=== His motto ===
"Vivre Libre ou Mourir" He imposed this motto on the Battalion of the Filles-Saint-Thomas in September 1789; it then becomes one of the most famous currency slogans during the French Revolution.

== Works ==
- « Règlement pour l'infanterie prussienne », translation, 1757.
- « Recherches sur les principes généraux de la tactique », 1767.
- « Collection de différents morceaux sur l’histoire naturelle et civile du Nord et sur l’histoire naturelle en général », translation, 1763.
- « Voyages en Sibérie, contenant la description des mœurs et des usages des peuples, les noms des rivières, la situation des montagnes », translation 1767.
- « Les penchants de la nature », 1768, discourse qui obtient l'accessit à l'académie du prix de l'académie royale des belles-lettres de Prusse.
- « L’histoire naturelle des glacières de Suisse », translation, 1770.
- « Observations élémentaires pour la tactique moderne », 1771.
- « Recherches sur les premiers fondements généraux de la tactique », 1771.
- « Mémoires de l’académie des Sciences de Stockholm concernant l’histoire naturelle, la physique, la médecine, l’anatomie, la chimie, l’économie, les arts, … », translation, 1772.
- « Recueil de lettres de S.M le Roi de Prusse pour servir à l'histoire de la dernière guerre », 1772.
- « Relation de la bataille de Rosbach », 1772.
- « Histoire de la guerre entre la Russie et la Turquie, et particulièrement de la campagne de 1769 », translation, 1773.
- « Histoire de la guerre des russes et des impériaux contre les turcs de 1736 à 1739 », translation, 1777.
- « Mémoire sur l’origine du peuple suédois », discourse, 1782.
- « Mémoire sur les lois et usages militaires des Grecs et des Romains », discourse, 1784.
- « De la connaissance que les anciens ont eu des pays du Nord de l’Europe », 1793.
- « Discours sur l’amour de la patrie », translation, 1789.
- « De la constitution militaire », 1789.
- « De la liberté d’énoncer, d’écrire et d’imprimer la pensée », 1790.
- « De la liberté de la presse », 1790.
- « L'edda ou la mythologie septentrionale », translation.
- « Extrait de l'histoire naturelle du renne », translation.
