= Filles de Saint Thomas Battalion =

National Guard unit of France (1789–1792)

- Bataillon des Filles-Saint-Thomas
- Active: 13 July 1789 – 10 August 1792
- Country: Kingdom of France
- Allegiance: Louis XVI
- Branch: National Guard
- Type: Royal guard
- Motto: Vivre Libre ou Mourir
- Engagements: French Revolution; Insurrection of 10 August 1792

Commanders
- Notable commanders: Louis-Félix Guinement de Kéralio

The Filles de Saint Thomas Battalion (French: Bataillon des Filles-Saint-Thomas) is part of the National Guard of Paris, established on 13 July 1789. It is known for its participation in the defense of the Tuileries Palace, during the Insurrection of 10 August 1792. Preceding the fall of the monarchy, it played an important role in the suppression of the various Parisian uprisings and during the royalist uprising of 13 Vendémiaire. Renamed the Lepelletier section, it is the spearhead of the demonstrators. Guardsmen who survived the Insurrection of 10 August all died during the September Massacres or were guillotined.

== An Aristocratic Battalion? ==
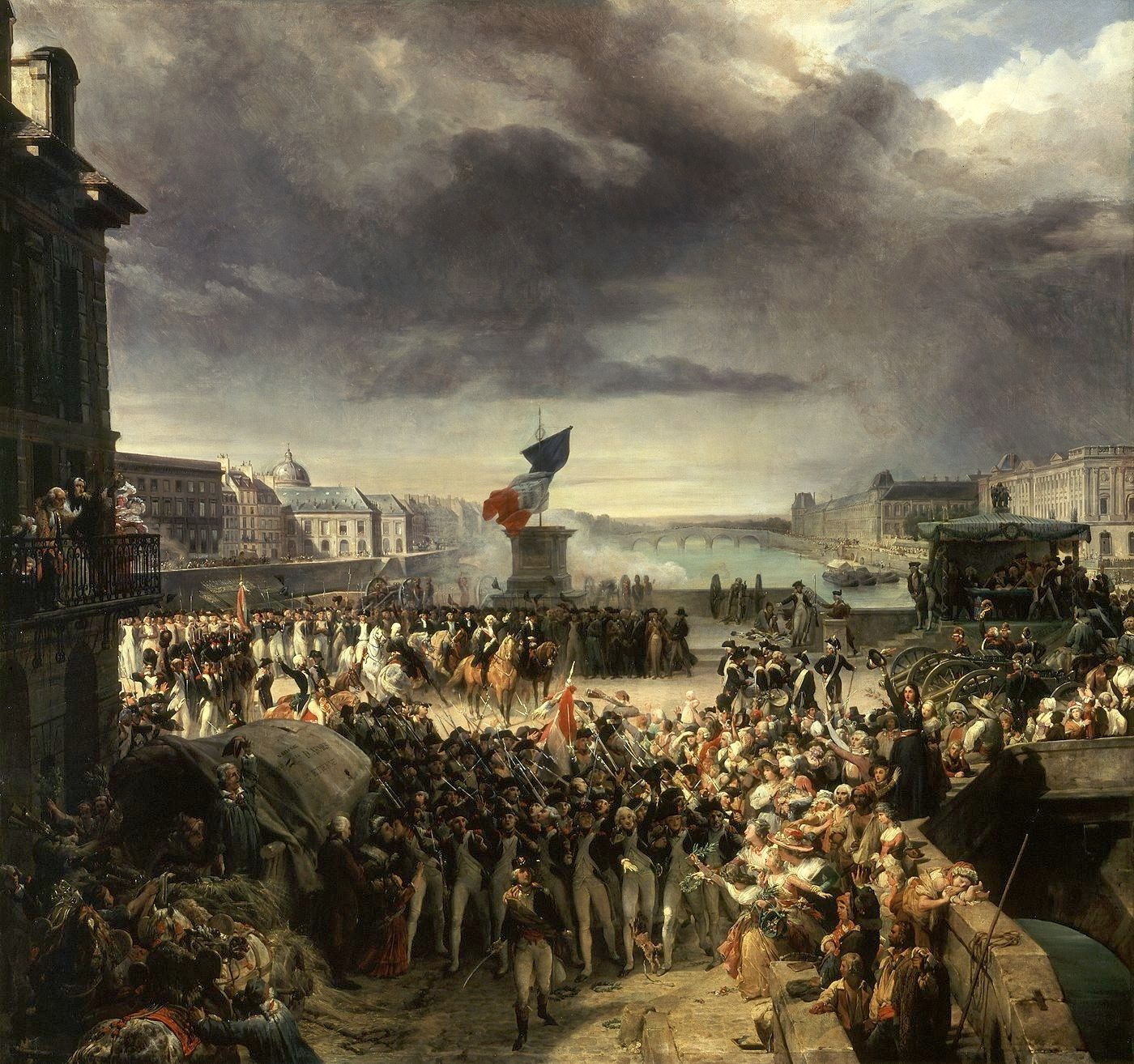
The National Guard of Paris Departs for the Army (Léon Cogniet, 1834)

Nothing suggests in 1789 that the battalion will become an aristocratic battalion. The first commander of the Filles de Saint Thomas Battalion was Louis-Félix Guynement de Kéralio, father of Louise-Félicité de Kéralio, woman of letters and feminist. The sixty battalions, which correspond to the sixty districts of the capital, each received a flag during the months of August and September 1789. François Robert, son-in-law of Louis Félix Guynement de Kéralio, noted that the epigraph of his newspaper, Le Mercure national, hardly changes from that of the flag of the district of Filles-Saint-Thomas: Live free or die. The battalion and district are in no way hostile to new ideas:

- Nicolas-Jean Hugou de Bassville is a member of the district committee;
- Louis-Lézin de Milly, American, citizen of Paris, lawyer Parlement, is one of the commissioners named by the district of the des Filles Saint Thomas for the examination of the question relating to the freedom and abolition of the slave trade. He presided over the assembly of the district of Filles-Saint-Thomas and then of the section of the library from May to November 1790;
- Tassin de l’Etang, the second commander of the battalion, saw in October 1789 an individual with a black cockade, a rallying sign for the enemies of the Revolution, he immediately tore it off and trampled him underfoot.

However, the grenadiers of the Filles de Saint Thomas Battalion were often bourgeois, moderate, and were very attached to the king and to the Constitution. They consist of bankers, stockbrokers, and merchants. "As they had, from the day the king came to Paris, to share the service of the castle with elite troops, and in particular with the Swiss, they did not want to be ridiculous and trained. The Feuillants and the Filles-Saint-Thomas operated like old soldiers."

Madame Agathe de Rambaud, who took care of the education of the future Louis XVII, recounting her memories from 1785 to 1792, to her family and those close to her, insisted on the differences in attitude of the battalions which in turn ensured the guard at the Tuileries Palace for more than two years. But the attitude of the National Guard in 1792 was considered much less loyal by those close to the royal family. It actually varies from battalion:

One evening, when a National Guardsmen arrived at the Tuileries, the Queen went to the little garden of the Dauphin, whose she returns by the Water terrace. Federates passing on the quay, having seen the Queen, insult her. Marie-Antoinette wants to retire, but the National Guards beg her not to and to let them teach these fellows that they are not to be feared. They then start shouting:

"Long live the King and the royal family!"

The federates complained the next day to the Legislative Assembly, which, although informed of their insolence, congratulated them. The National Guards accompanying the Queen are from the Filles de Saint Thomas Battalion.

The Filles de Saint Thomas Battalions, the Petits-Pères, Henry IV and that of the Grands-Augustins protected us from brigands and rebels, wrote Madame de Tourzel in her memoirs.

=== The King's last defenders ===
The King's Constitutional Guard was dissolved on 29 May 1792 by the decree of the Legislative Assembly. The Duke of Brissac is ordered to be arrested, and the posts of the Tuileries Palace are handed over to the National Guard.

The National Guard and the Swiss Guards are the last troops ensuring the defense of the king against the revolutionaries. However, if General Galiot Mandat de Grancey always guarantees on his head the good intentions of the king, because of the flight from Varennes and the revolutionary propaganda, he no longer succeeds in convincing all the National Guards. The battalions of the faubourgs Saint Antoine and Saint Marceau were frankly hostile to him from 1789, and, in the other battalions, the poorest guards were susceptible to Jacobin ideas.

After this dissolution, La Fayette is seen as a traitor in the eyes of certain revolutionaries, because he arrives in Paris, sworn to defend the king and uphold the Constitution.

=== Preparations before the 10 August Insurrection ===
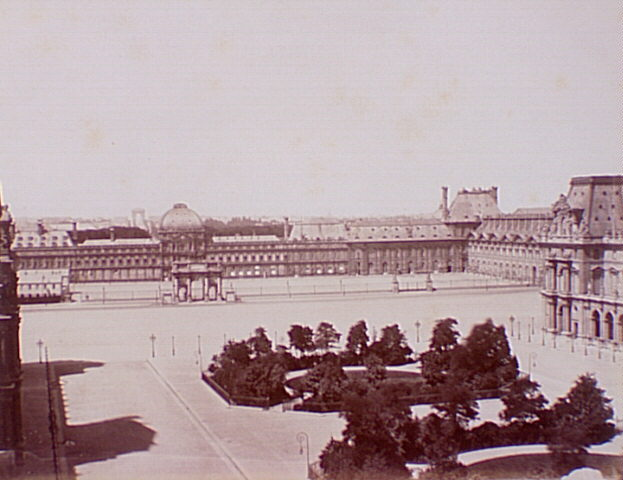
The Tuileries Palace where the battalion stands guard when it is its turn. The Marsan pavilion is to the right of the photo.

On 20 June 1792, Boscary de Villeplaine, the battalion's second in command, arrived to the defense of the royal family. Three rows of grenadiers from the Filles de Saint Thomas Battalion lined up in front of the table and protect the royal family from the revolutionaries.

On 14 July 1792, during the second anniversary of the Fête de la Fédération, the King left the Tuileries Palace at noon to go to the Champ de Mars, having in his carriage the Queen, the two children, Madame Élisabeth, and the Princess of Lamballe. The king's escort is composed of Swiss Guards and grenadiers from the National Guard. She succeeds in ensuring his protection. Even if François-René de Chateaubriand observes that:

"Paris no longer had in 1792 the physiognomy of 1789 and 1790. It was no longer the nascent Revolution, it was people walking drunk on its destinies across the abysses, by wayward paths. The appearance of the people was not tumultuous, furious, eager, it was menacing. One met, in the streets, only frightening or wild figures, people who slipped along the houses in order not to be perceived, or who prowled seeking their prey..."

— François-René de Chateaubriand

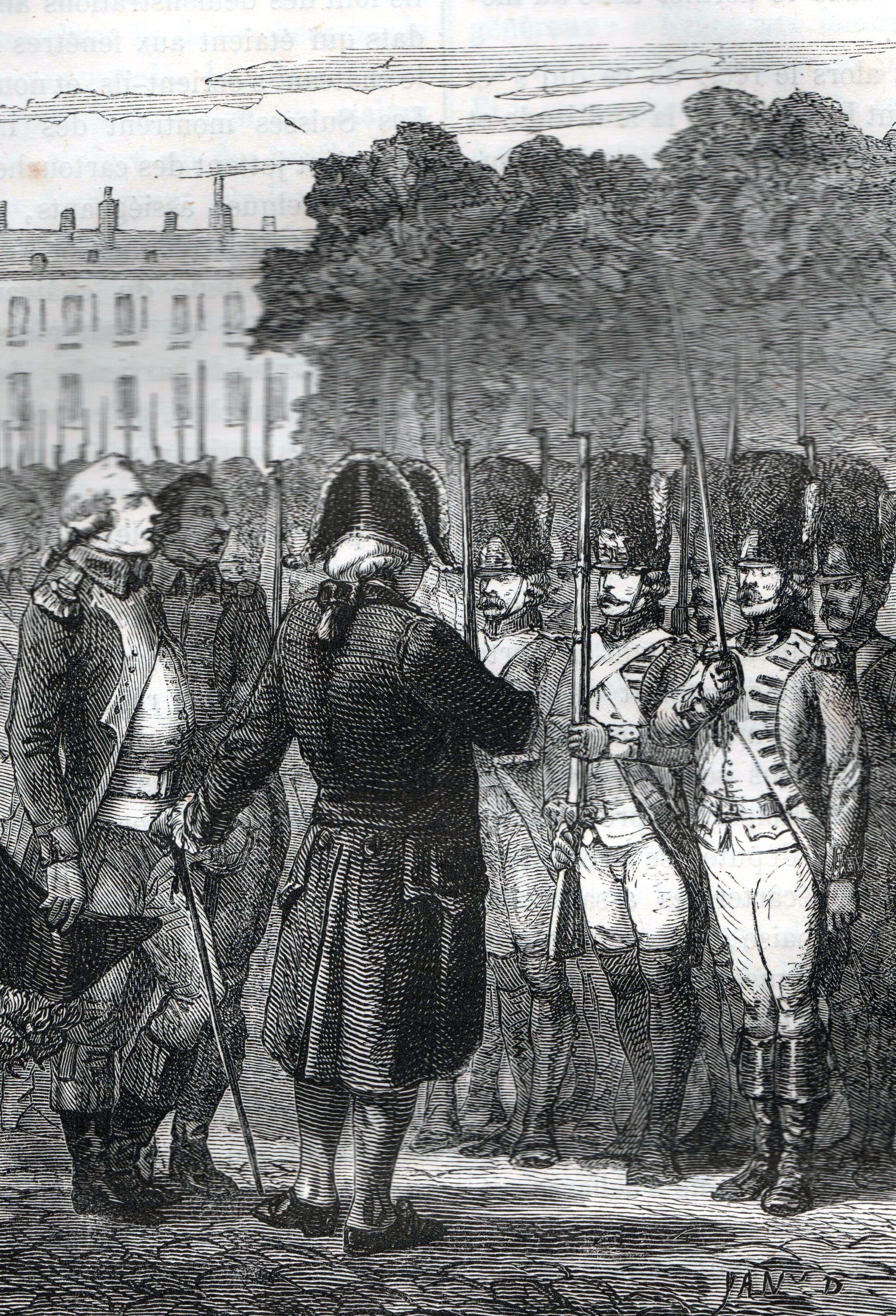
Louis XVI inspecting the ranks of the troops defending the Tuileries Palace with Augustin-Joseph de Mailly, Marshal of France, before the Insurrection of 10 August.

On 20 July 1792, a rumor spread: "the deputies of the Left have been murdered by the aristocrats... 10,000 rifles are stored in the Tuileries." It is again the insurrection, but, this time, 4,000–5,000 National Guards arrive at the castle, and the federates and the men with piques in suburbs are wary of their attitude. The king orders Pétion to arrive and inspect the presence of his weapons.

On 30 July 1792, Duhamel, Lieutenant of the Filles de Saint Thomas Battalion, a stockbroker, was killed by Marseillais and other Guardsmen were more or less seriously injured. Additional revolutionaries come to their aid and attack the Marseille National Guardsmen. They take refuge in the Tuileries Palace. Mandat raises the drawbridge. The Guardsmen are looked after, cared for by the queen and the women. The grenadiers of the Filles de Saint Thomas Battalion, immediately mobilized by an order of Mandat point their guns in front of the Italian Comedy and Théodore de Lameth proposes to attack the barracks of the Marseillais. Mathieu Dumas demanded that Duhamel's body be brought to the bar of the Assembly, but Charles Barbaroux would later say that the affair was "a plot intended to massacre the people of Marseilles". The next day, the Revolutions of Paris recounts that "six or seven hundred men dressed in black, all Knights of Saint-Louis spent the night at the castle". Marie-Antoinette expressed concern in a letter to Fersen that "one hundred and eighty grenadiers fled...". Taine will not be surprised: "men quick to blows always prevail over merchants".

La Fayette writes: "I am told that the Filles de Saint Thomas Battalion sent its grenadiers to Metz... this 4 August 1792." This perhaps explains why they are only 600, or even 400 by adding a few guards from the Petits-Pères, according to other sources.

== The Insurrection of 10 August ==
=== Mandat and Marie-Antoinette ===
To reinforce the National Guardsmen, Mandat calls upon sixteen battalions from 5 August 1792, but only a little more than two thousand men agree to participate in the defense of the Tuileries Palace. Moreover, if the battalions of the Petits-Pères and the Filles-Saint-Thomas demonstrated their devotion to the royal cause on arrival, it was not the same for most of the others, in particular for that of the gunners of the Val-de-Grace who, commanded by Captain Langlade, seem ready at any moment to go over to the side of the insurgents. Marie-Antoinette, in front of her apartments, harangues twenty grenadiers of the National Guard: "Gentlemen, all that you hold most dear, your wives and your children, depend on our existence, our interest is common."

and pointing to them nobles who are preparing to be attacked by the enemies in the apartments, she adds:

"You must have no mistrust of these brave people who will share your dangers and will die until the last to defend their King."

The servants of the Tuileries and the nobles, some of whom came in the uniform of National Guard grenadiers with bear caps, were generally poorly armed.

Some of the officers of the Filles de Saint Thomas Battalion dined on 9 August with members of the Feuillants, a few notables and Moreau de Saint-Méry. They share their toasts to the King and Constitution. The simple guards also drank a little to give themselves courage. They fear the Parisian rioters, because they have, as we have seen, defended the Tuileries several times. The sacrifice of their lives may seem excessive to them. The National Guardsmen possess only three cartridges per man.

=== Defense of the Tuileries Palace ===
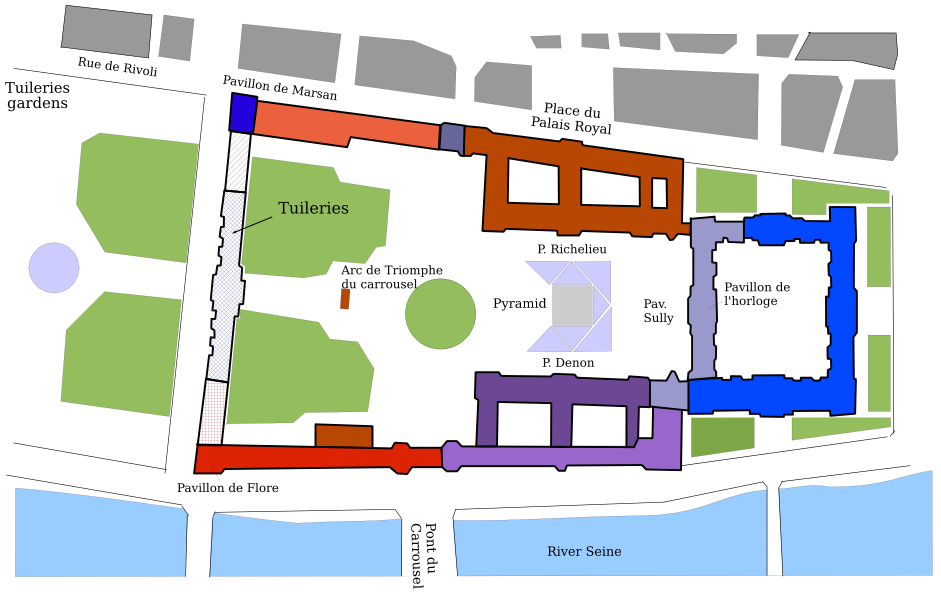
Former location of the palace.

The guards are positioned during the nights of 9 August to 10 August in various posts. The Filles de Saint Thomas Battalion is stationed near the flag of Marsan of the national grenadiers, on the first floor of the Grande Galerie in two rows, one facing the Seine and the other towards the court of the Princes. The gunners are located in the three courts. There are five pieces of cannons in the royal court, located between the door and the entrance to the vestibule, flanked by a battalion of National Guards on one side and a battalion of Swiss Guards on the other. The same number of rooms is placed in front of the central pavilion on the garden side. Finally, the National Guards were stationed at the Pont Neuf and under the Saint-Jean arcade, place de Grève. They also guard the exits from the Terrasse des Feuillants.

The mounted gendarmerie, composed primarily of former French Guards, is not safe. In total, the defense can only rely on fifteen or sixteen hundred faithful men. And they're running out of ammunition. During the night, Tassin de l'Etang, the commander of the Filles de Saint Thomas Battalion, and his brother meet with the king. Boscary de Villeplaine, the second in command of the battalion, met him several times.

=== The last dawn ===
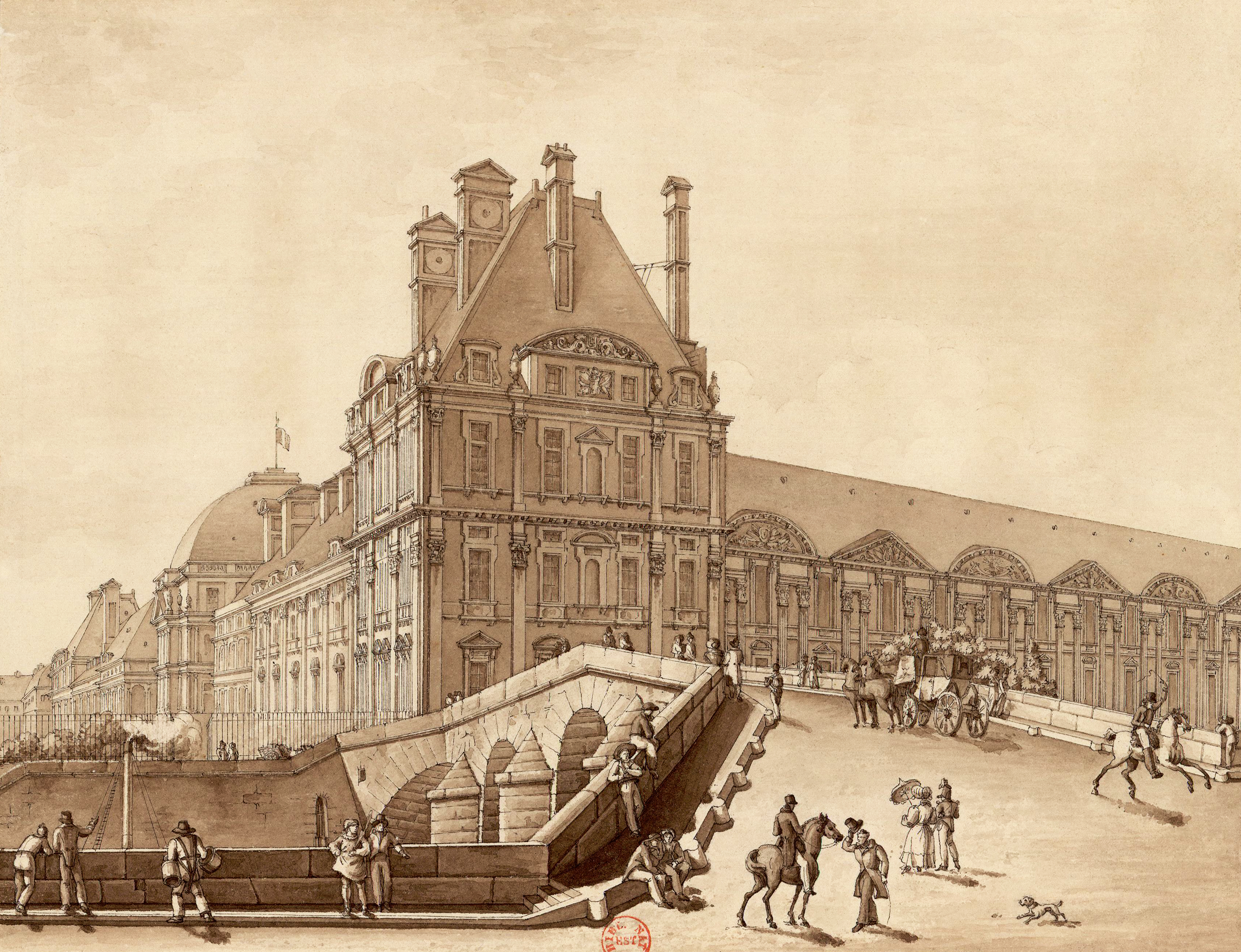
The Tuileries Palace, to the right of the engraving, the Grande Galerie.

On 10 August, at 4 a.m., a quarrel broke out between Adjutant-General Doucet and Captain Langlade about the position of the guns, which Langlade considered too close to the Porte-Royale and which he retreat to the chagrin of the warrant officer. The gunners of Val-de-Grâce, who did not conceal their republican sentiments, threatened to defect when the patriots went on the attack. The grenadiers of Filles de Saint Thomas Battalion replied that they would not hesitate to push them to fire using the force of their bayonets.

Acloque, head of the second legion of the National Guard, hastens to warn the royal family, gathered in the king's chamber, of the imminence of danger. To appease the crowd, Louis XVI agrees to show himself, and goes to the œil-de-bœuf room where he is surrounded by Acloque, several officers, the ministers Lajard and Chambonas, Madame Élisabeth and other people. He allows himself to be placed in the embrasure of one of the windows of the room, while several rows of benches are placed in front of him to protect him. Six royalist grenadiers from the Filles de Saint Thomas Battalion arrived at the same time. The sergeant of the gunners, Joly, is placed on the right of the king, a grenadier, Auguste, on his left, and the marshal de Mouchy sits in front.

== Pétion and the Swiss Guards ==
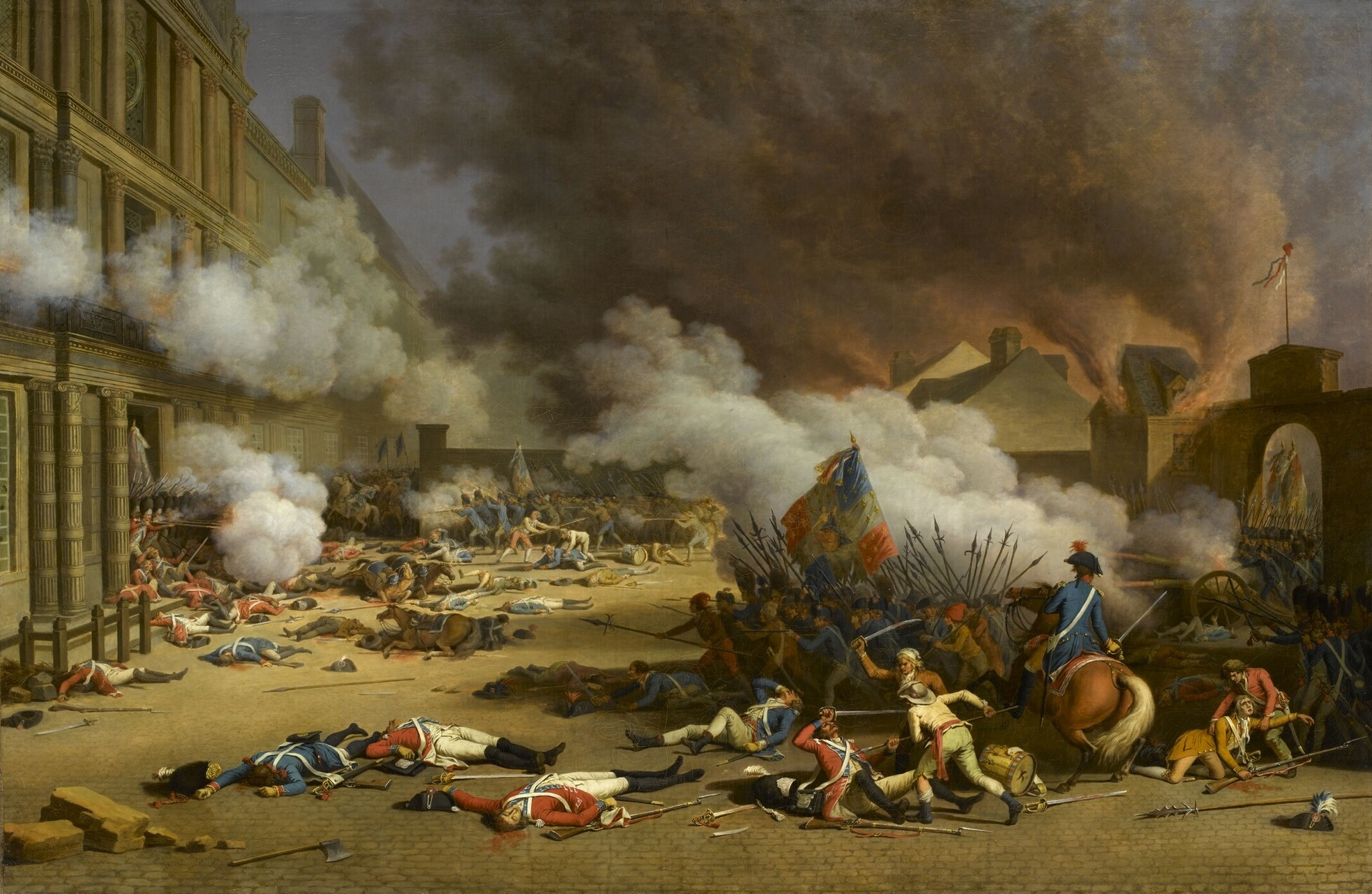
Capture of the Tuileries Palace, Jean Duplessis-Bertaux

Excusing himself due to the extreme heat, Pétion then goes down to the terrace. He was poorly received there by the loyalist National Guards of the Filles de Saint Thomas Battalion. From then on, he thinks only of taking shelter. The guards keep him by force and he is only released after repeated orders from the king. Reluctantly, in his capacity as mayor, Pétion signs the order to repel force if the castle is attacked.

Most of the Swiss Guards, well supervised and accustomed to strict discipline, although the departure of the two companies which had accompanied the royal family to the Assembly had greatly reduced them, were still capable of resisting. Some are at the windows with voluntary gentlemen; others have been massed on the steps of the grand staircase leading down from the apartments and the chapel into the vestibule. They mingled with Guardsmen of the Filles Saint Thomas, protected by a barricade and guns in aim, they await the attack.

== After the 10 August Insurrection ==
=== The casualties ===
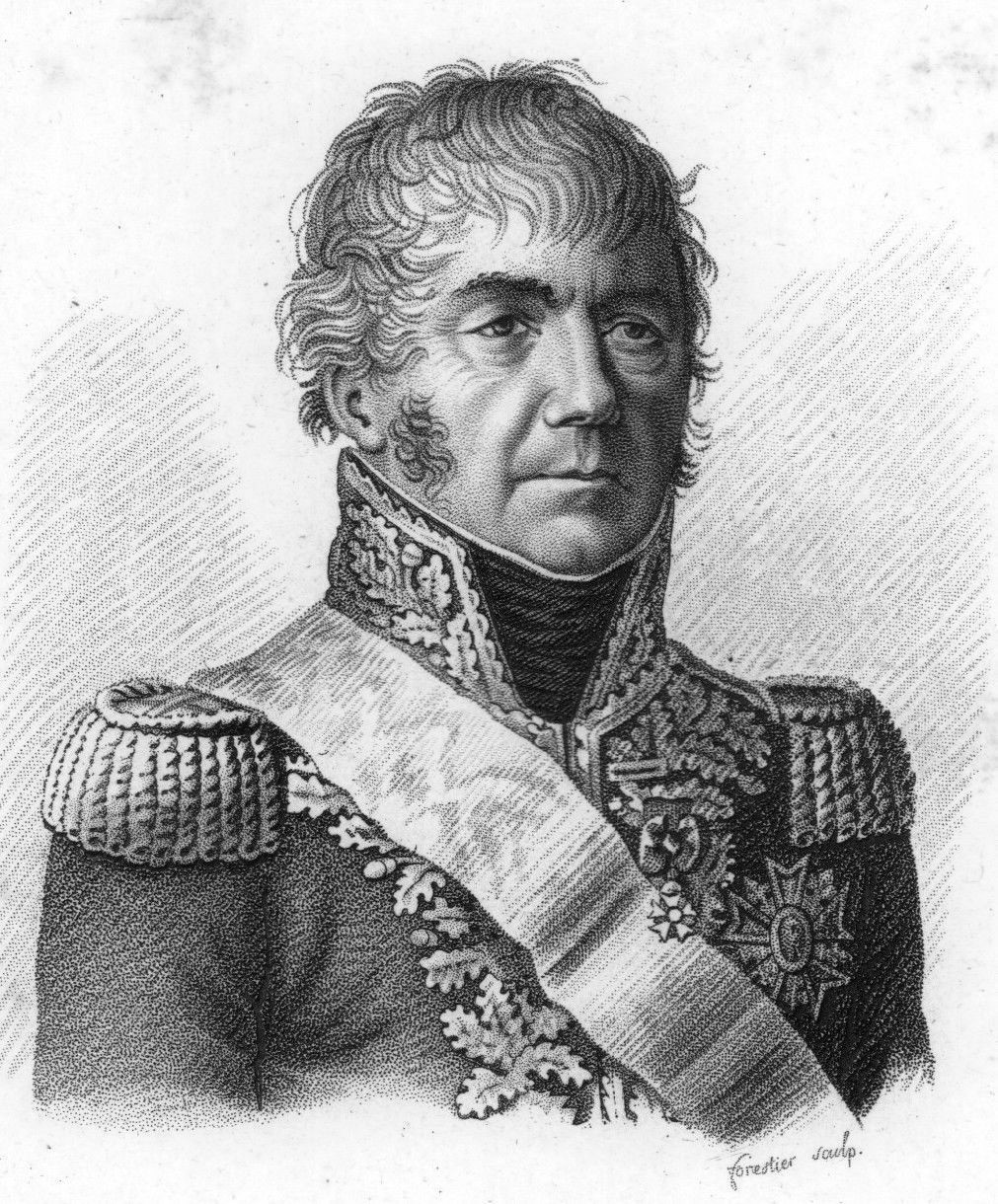
François Joseph Lefebvre.

The National Guardsmen of the Filles de Saint Thomas Battalion who were not killed in the fighting attempted to flee, despite the revolutionaries searching for the defenders of the palace. Some will die in prison from their wounds or are killed during the ensuing September massacres. Boscary de Villeplaine, the second in command, hides in Brie. When about fifty soldiers are searching for him, he takes refuge in Beaujolais, and from there emigrates to Switzerland.

For the survivors of the Filles de Saint Thomas Battalion, it was the last act of resistance. The Feuillants, companies of grenadiers, and chasseurs of the National Guard which formed the force of the bourgeoisie are dissolved. Many officers of the Guard relinquished their duties and the elite companies are dissolved.

Most of the defenders who escaped from the Tuileries Palace were gradually arrested. This is the case of Weber, a grenadier of the Filles de Saint Thomas Battalion and foster brother of Marie-Antoinette. A report of the commissioners appointed by the Assembly of 12 August 1792 is written on the conduct of the battalion of the Filles de Saint Thomas, from 9 August to August 10. The section changes its name: first section of 1792, then Lepelletier. The revolutionaries accuse the grenadiers of participation in the "liberticide plots of the tyrant Capet."

The future Marshal of the Empire, François Joseph Lefebvre, husband of Madame Sans-gêne, first sergeant of the French Guards on 9 April 1788, was not imprisoned, but he was not there. However, he entered as an instructor in the Filles de Saint Thomas Battalion and at the head of a detachment of this battalion, was wounded twice while defending the royal family. The first time by trying to protect her on her return to the Tuileries Palace after her departure for Saint-Cloud, and the second time by encouraging the flight to Rome of the aunts of King Louis XVI and in 1792, he saved the cash discount of the plunder.
