= Etta Palm d'Aelders =

Dutch feminist and spy (1743–1799)

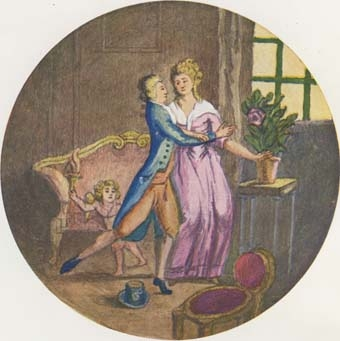
- A 1776 depiction of Palm d'Aelders
- Born: Etta Lubina Johanna Aelders; April 1743; Groningen, Netherlands
- Died: 28 March 1799 (aged 55); Netherlands
- Occupations: Writer, Spy, Revolutionary feminist
- Spouse: Christiaan Ferdinand Lodewijk Palm

Etta Lubina Johanna Palm d'Aelders (April 1743 – 28 March 1799), also known as the Baroness of Aelders, was a Dutch spy and feminist, outspoken during the French Revolution. She gave the address Discourse on the Injustice of the Laws in Favour of Men, at the Expense of Women to the French National Convention on 30 December 1790 and was a founding member of the first female-only organisation in the history of France, Société patriotique et de bienfaisance des Amies de la Vérité. D'Aelders used these political platforms to instruct French citizens on the struggles of women in the public and private spheres, and to show men the harm that was being caused to the lives of women through their relative social inferiority. D'Aelders joined women like Olympe de Gouges and Théroigne de Méricourt in her resolute determination to improve the rights of women and mobilise tangible action to drive female equality forward.

== Biography ==
Etta Lubina Johanna d'Aelders was born into a middle-class family in Groningen in April 1743. She was the daughter of Jacob Aelders van Nieuwenhuys, a wallpaper merchant and pawnbroker, and his second wife Agatha Petronella de Sitter. Aelders's father died in 1749 when she was only six years old. Her mother took over the family's business as manager of the pawnshop, a move which was protested by her family, the de Sitters, who did not believe it to be an appropriate occupation as her late husband Jacob had been of a lower social standing than her. The business is recorded to have not been particularly successful, with speculation that widespread anti-semitism resulted in discrimination against d'Aelders's mother due to her Jewish business partner. Despite this, d'Aelders's mother provided a good education for d'Aelders, allowing her to study French and also possibly some English and Italian. This education was remarkable for a girl from a non-aristocratic family at the time.

Around her later teenage years, d'Aelders met Christiaan Ferdinand Lodewijk Palm, the son of a prosecutor from Arnhem, whom she married in 1762. The marriage was not happy, there is speculation that d'Aelders was unfaithful, and Christiaan disappeared to Dutch colonies of the East Indies leaving d'Aelders pregnant. One child was born from the marriage the same year as her husband's disappearance in 1763, named Agatha after d'Aelders's mother, but the infant passed away within three months of birth.

In 1768 d'Aelders traveled with young attorney Jan Munniks, brother of the celebrated professor of botany Wynoldus Munniks, who had been appointed consul at Messina for the Dutch Republic to France. D'Aelders left with him for Messina, but it is unclear if she ever reached Italy. According to her biographer Koppius, Munniks left d'Aelders during the trip due to impatience with illness she was facing at the time. On the way she met Douwe Sirtema van Grovestins, a former equerry to the widow of Stadtholder William IV, Prince of Orange, who became her lover, and introduced her in higher circles. She left him in 1773 and moved to Paris, settling in the Palais Royal area. It is written that she secured a large income through her connections, benefitting from profits on shares in military necessities such as gunpowder and saltpeter. With this income d'Aelders was able to live in luxurious quarters and her house is said to have functioned as a salon for young intellectuals. She became a courtesan for the better classes, allegedly taking a number of lovers. In 1778 her diplomatic engagement started and continued until 1792.

=== Espionage ===
In these circumstances d'Aelders was recruited for the French secret service, possibly by Jean-Frédéric Phélypeaux, comte de Maurepas. She often served conflicting interests, sometimes the Netherlands, sometimes Prussia and sometimes France. Upon her arrival in France, she was paid to inform the stadtholder about French diplomacy. Phélypeaux asked d'Aelders to return to Holland in 1778 to make inquiries into the public mood in the Dutch republic about the English-American War, as France was interested in winning Dutch support for its pact with America in case of a Franco-English conflict. During this short mission to The Hague, she again met Jan Munniks, who himself was now a spy in the British service.

Hardenberg, who wrote the 1962 biography: Etta Palm, een Hollandse Parisienne 1743–1799, writes that her career in diplomacy and espionage was successful due to several 'intimate affairs' with men, but this is unconfirmable and could be argued as irrelevant in the face of her successful diplomatic career.

D'Aelders was eventually based in The Hague where she now spied on French émigrés like Beaumarchais and Dumouriez. However, later in her life, events in France forced her to change sides again and she imposed on the stadtholder himself, referring to her old services. Then in early 1795 the French revolutionary armies invaded the Netherlands. The Batavian Republic was proclaimed and Etta became suspect, because she tried to persuade the French representatives at the negotiations for the Treaty of The Hague (1795) to use the right of conquest to the detriment of the new Republic. These machinations, in collaboration with her old acquaintance Jan Munniks, brought her to the attention of the Hague Comité van Waakzaamheid (the Dutch equivalent of the French Comité de surveillance révolutionnaire). Munniks was sentenced to banishment, and d'Aelders was put under arrest in the fortress of Woerden together with her old spymaster Van de Spiegel. She was released at the end of 1798, but her health had suffered so much, that she died in the Hague the following March on the 28th 1799, and is thought to have been buried in an unmarked grave in a cemetery in Rijswijk.

== Political activity ==
Due to d'Aelders's highly-praised espionage and diplomatic work, the financial income from her missions enabled her to move to a grander house at the Rue Favart in Paris, where she set up a salon, where many politically engaged people met. At this time she was given her affectation of the title of "baroness." Among these meetings were Dutchmen like Gerard Brantsen, who negotiated the peace between the Republic and Austria in Paris in 1784, and Apollonius Jan Cornelis Lampsins, a prominent Patriot, who sought refuge in France in 1787. She also apparently started working for the Dutch Grand Pensionary Laurens Pieter van de Spiegel, to whom she became especially valuable after the events of 14 July 1789, when her salon was frequented by prominent revolutionaries like Jean-Paul Marat, François Chabot and Claude Basire.

During this time she developed a lively correspondence with many political figures including the Dutch Grand Pensionary Van de Spiegel and the French minister Lebrun. Some of her letters have been preserved and they show she was engaged in political discourse. In one letter dated 18 January 1790, de Spiegel is shown to be expounding his views to her regarding the principles of the Dutch constitution.

D'Aelders's political and diplomatic participation and influence should not be understated. She is known as having almost single-handedly averted the 1784 conspiracy against Van Brunswijk, the personal counsellor of the stadtholder. In 1787 revolting patriots arrested Princess Wilhelmina, the wife of the stadholder, and the Prussian army intervened to defeat the patriots, many of whom fled to France. The possibility of a civil war followed, which could have exposed the Netherlands to the threat of foreign powers or threaten its autonomy. D'Aelders mediated on her own initiative and succeeded in stopping France from intervening in the conflict as planned by minister Breteuil in 1787. In 1790 she was able to reassure and calm the French government regarding news about involvement of the Dutch government in a counter revolutionary plot.

A number of historians describe d'Aelders's work as politically ambiguous. Criticism written of her by a journalist from the Gazette universelle claiming that she favoured monarchy in the Netherlands and the republic in France has been affirmed by Hardenberg in his biography of d'Aelders, who also interpreted her political beliefs in this manner. She is recorded as defending her own revolutionary political beliefs, for example, she protested against her exclusion from the Société Fraternelle des Patriotes de l'un et l'autre sexe (Fraternal Society of Patriots of Both Sexes). She is also suspected to have faced Dutch patriots in the French press who sought to undermine her influence.

Historian Judith Vega writes that 'd'Aelders in her political views combines loyal adherence to the House of Orange with democratic republican ideals and feminist Zeal'. It is perhaps notable that the de Sitter family, into which d'Aelders's mother was born, is often cited as holding strong Orangeist sympathies and interests.

From 1789, when d'Aelders wrote to Van de Spiegel advising him to reform the Dutch constitution to shift power to the people, her enthusiasm for the revolution was no longer contested.

== Revolutionary and feminist activity ==
During the Revolution, d'Aelders carried out remarkable activity in favour of women's emancipation and gender equality. She was closely linked to Louise-Félicité de Kéralio, editor-in-chief of the Journal d'État et du Citoyen. She also had links to Olympe de Gouges, whose ideas she supported.

By 1790, when her feminist activities took a start, she was already a well-known political figure. From the beginnings of the French Revolution in 1789, she was a loyal defender of its cause. Among her acquaintances were, for example, Robespierre and Condorcet.

D'Aelders was one of the few women to take direct political action in the French Revolution, her support for it being so great that preserved correspondence shows her urging Van de Spiegel to make reforms to the Dutch constitution in order to grant the people more power. She gained public attention for her activities in the French Revolution when she interrupted a meeting of the Amis de la Vérité (Society of the Friends of Truth, also known as Cercle social) on 26 November 1790 in order to support an exhausted orator defending the rights of women. D'Aelders's speech, titled 'On the injustice of the law in favour of men, at the expense of women' (French: Sur l´injustice des Loix en faveur des Hommes, aux dépens de Femmes), did not question the domestic role nor the subordination of women, but demanded the possibility for women to intervene in political life. Cercle social was a key group for those involved in Paris's political sphere and shaped the intellectual and political debates that occurred in the city. D'Aelders became involved in revolutionary politics and was especially active in feminist circles, like the Société Fraternelle des Patriotes de l'un et l'autre sexe.

D'Aelders then decided to take more concrete action, formulating a plan in February 1791 to create a network of patriotic women's societies across France, much like those already functioning under the leadership of men. The societies would be organised and connected by a central, federal society in Paris. As part of this ambitious agenda, d'Aelders founded a women's equivalent to Cercle social, named Société Patriotique et de Bienfaisance des Amies de la Vérité in March 1791, which became the focal point of her feminist activities in countering prejudice against women. The society was focused on women's rights and membership was only offered to women. Through the society, d'Aelders wanted to advance the prospects of underprivileged girls by teaching them skills. Unfortunately she never succeeded in setting up the schools or workshops to teach these skills, but she did benefit three girls by financing apprenticeships for them with subscription money paid by society members.

As the president of Société Patriotique et de Bienfaisance des Amies de la Vérité, d'Aelders's speeches on the social and living conditions of women were read and heard widely, garnering popular support from Parisian women. As an eloquent speaker, she gained many listeners at society meetings as she spoke on politically charged topics like equal rights, better education and the right to divorce. On 1 April 1792, accompanied by a group of women, d'Aelders addressed the Assembly. The group asked the assembly to admit women to civil and military roles, that the education of girls be based on the same principles as those of boys, that women could become adults at the age of 21, and that the law on divorce be promulgated. The response of the President of the Assembly was outright refusal. However, the Assembly did later take direct action as a result of Etta's proposals. On 20 September 1792, the first divorce decree was implemented. This decree granted divorce on a variety of grounds, including mutual consent, and marked an important step towards women's liberation. The society survived until d'Aelders became a suspect of espionage in late 1792; the society then disappeared from the French public landscape.

Rumours of espionage were most harmful when d'Aelders was linked with the King of Prussia; although these accusations were unfounded. The shadow that was cast over her personal political allegiance stunted her developing political career as popular opinion turned against her. Despite this, the French government retained confidence in d'Aelders's political and oratory ability, sending her on a diplomatic mission to Holland. The newly founded French Republic wished to send an ambassador to the country. However, d'Aelders was seemingly unsuccessful in this attempt as she never returned to France, and did not take up her position on the political scene again.

=== Notable speeches and documents ===
==== Proposal of a network of women's clubs, 23 March 1791 ====
D'Aelders poses two questions: first, the question of France's foreign and domestic friends and foes, and second, the question of how patriotic women already involved in a men's political society might organise and exclusively women's circle to maximise their usefulness as administrators of welfare.

==== Call for an end to sexual discrimination, Summer 1791 ====
D'Aelders exhorts the National Assembly to legislate completely the equality of rights for women, but her main concerns are with equality between spouses in laws affecting marriage and equal opportunity for education. She speaks about the most radical feminist thought of the high enlightenment, grounding constitutional propositions in laws and rights of nature.

== Works ==
- Sur l´injustice des Loix en faveur des Hommes, au dépens de Femmes, in The French Revolution and Human Rights: A Brief Documentary History, translated, edited, and with an introduction by Lynn Hunt (Bedford/St. Martin's: Boston/New York), 1996, 122–123.
- Appel aux Francoises sur la régénération des moeurs, et nécessité de l'influence des femmes dans un gouvernement libre, L'imprimerie du Cercle Social, (probably) July, 1791. Facsimile in: Les femmes dans la révolution Française, T. 2, Paris, Edhis, 1982 and on Gallica

== Sources ==
- (in Dutch)Instituut voor Nederlandse Geschiedenis (1905), Rijks geschiedkundige publicatiën. v. 1 1789–1795, pp. XLVII–LII (Bl. 148 noot)

== Literature ==
- (in French) Blanc, O. (1997) "Etta-Lubina-Johana d'Aëlders, Mme Palm", in Les Libertines, Plaisir et Liberté au temps des Lumières, Paris, Perrin, pp. 213–234, 256–258.
- (in Dutch) Hardenberg, H. (1962) Etta Palm. Een Hollandse Parisienne 1743–1799, Assen
- (in Dutch) Koppius, W.J.(1929) Etta Palm. Nederlands's eerste feministe, Zeist
- Vega, J.A. (1989a) "Feminist Republicanism. Etta Palm-Aelders on justice, virtue and men", in: History of European Ideas, special issue on Women and the French Revolution (eds. R.M. Dekker and J.A. Vega), 10, 3, pp. 333–351
- Vega, J.A. (1989b) "Luxury, necessity, or the morality of men. The republican discourse of Etta Palm-Aelders", in: Les Femmes et la Révolution Francaise, Actes du Colloque, I, Toulouse, Presses Universitaires du Mirail, pp. 363–370
- Vega, J.A. (1998) Inventing enlightenment's gender, The representation of modernity in dispute. (doctoral thesis), University of Leiden, pp. 96–116
- (in French)Villiers, M. de (1910) Histoire des Club des Femmes et des Légions d´Amazones, Paris, pp. 14– 41
