= Vivre Libre ou Mourir =

Motto of the French Revolution

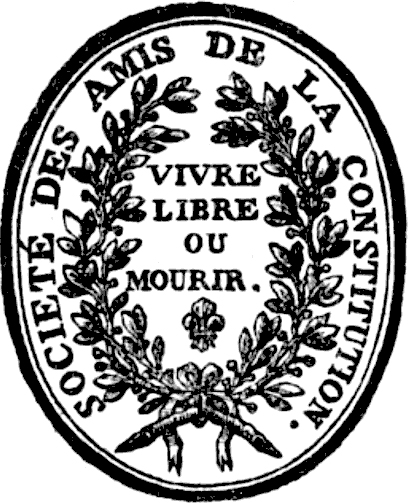
Vignette of the Society of Friends of the Constitution (Jacobins) during the constitutional period of the French Revolution

"Vivre Libre ou Mourir" was a motto of the French Revolution. It was notably the motto of the Society of Friends of the Constitution, better known as the Jacobins and of the Battalion of the Filles-Saint-Thomas of the National Guard from September 1789. It also appears at the top of the Journal d'État et du citoyen written and edited by Louise-Félicité de Kéralio in August 1789, whose father was the commander of the Battalion of the Filles-Saint-Thomas. In her famous work published in 1791, Les crimes des reines de France depuis le commencement de la monarchie jusqu'à Marie-Antoinette, Louise-Félicité de Kéralio concludes with the being who has sworn to live free or die, and makes fun of the anger of tyrants.

The anecdote tells that after the flight to Varennes, in the carriage which was bringing the royal family back to Paris, the Dauphin deciphered the motto engraved on the buttons of the deputy Antoine Barnave.

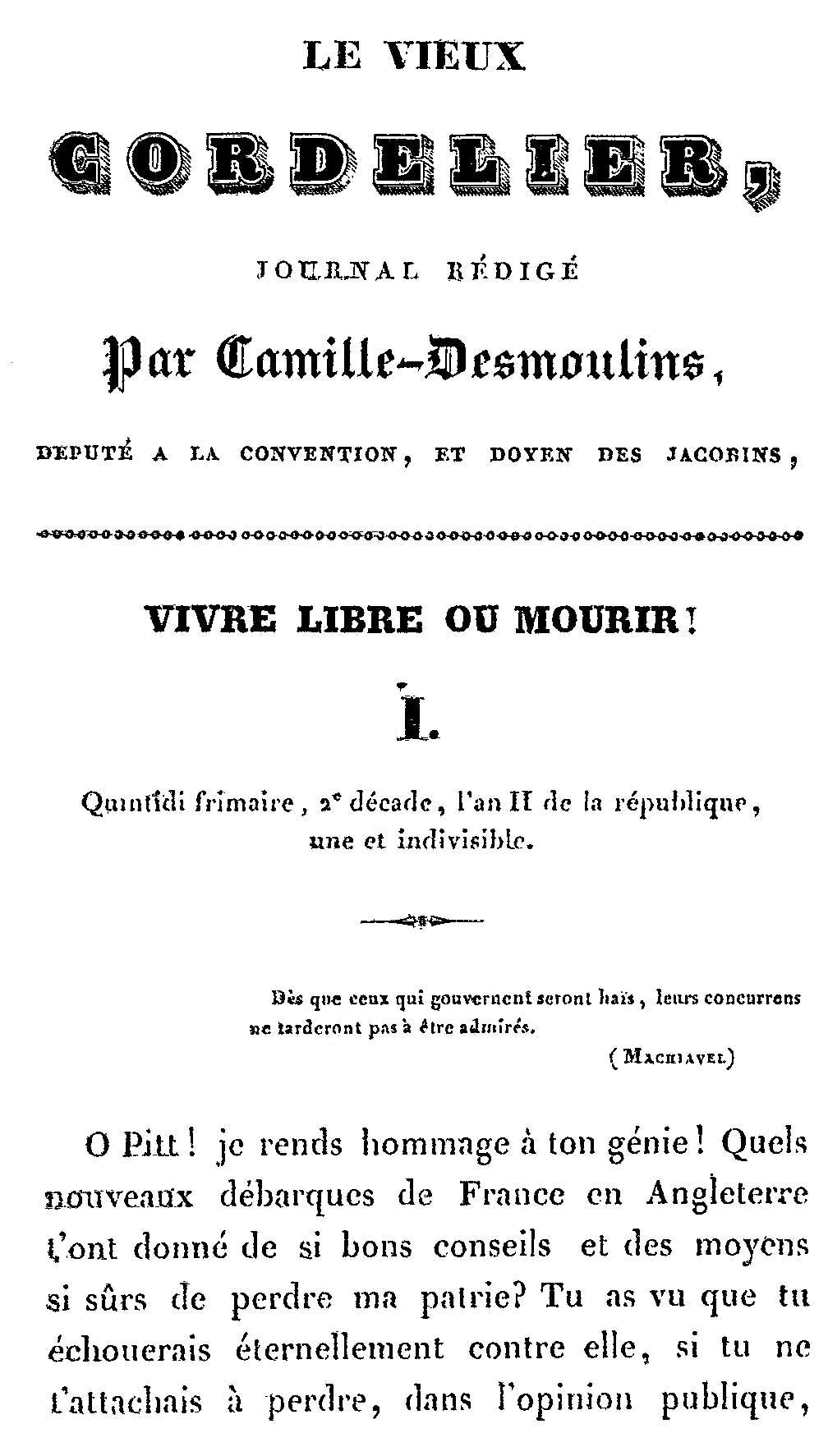

It was taken up by Camille Desmoulins for his newspaper Le Vieux Cordelier from 1793 to 1794.

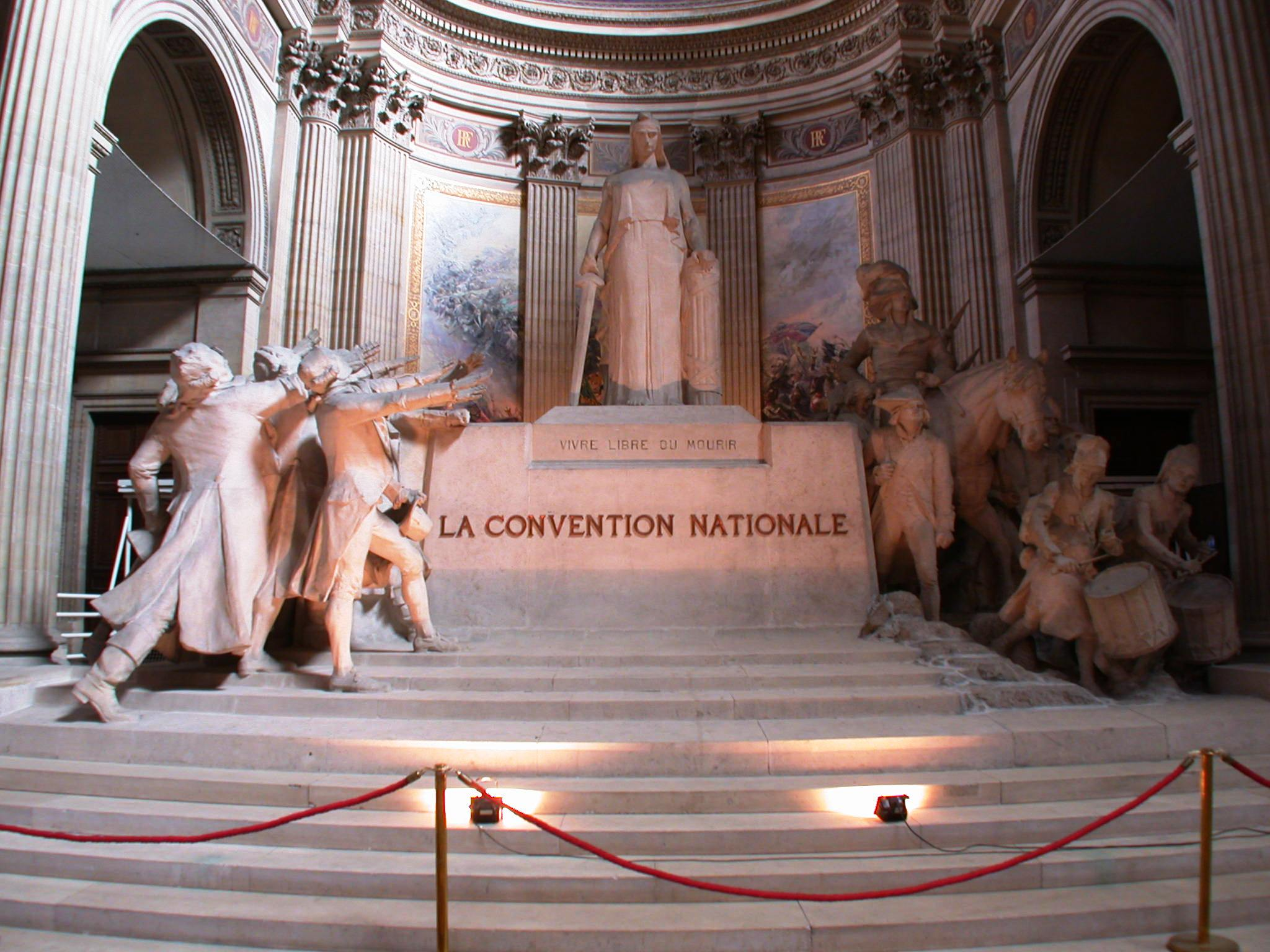
The motto Vivre Libre ou Mourir on the central monument of the Pantheon in Paris representing the National Convention.

It is engraved on the central monument of the Panthéon in Paris representing the National Convention.

It is also the official motto of the state of New Hampshire ("Live Free or Die"), adopted by the state in 1945.

The formula was taken up by Louis Delgrès and his companions, anti-slavery, before their suicide in Matouba in Guadeloupe in 1802.

The phrase is also found in a note written on July 31, 1809, by General John Stark, New Hampshire's most famous soldier of the American Revolutionary War. His poor health forced him to decline an invitation to a commemoration of the Battle of Bennington, so he sent his note by letter:

Live free or die: Death is not the worst of evils.

However, the authorship of the motto can be disputed with Stark, the line "We must be free or die" is used by the English romantic poet William Wordsworth, in his poem "It is not to be Thought of", close to the French republicans and written during the French Revolution.

The motto was adopted at the same time as the New Hampshire emblem on which it appears.

This motto was then probably taken up again during the Franco-Prussian War. It appears in particular on the monument to the Savoyards who died for France located in Annecy in Haute-Savoie, at the crossroads of the avenue de Genève and the rue de l'Intendance.

Finally, this motto was that of the resistance fighters of the Maquis des Glières.

During the winter of 1944, a group of resistance fighters from the Secret Army, made up of soldiers and resistance fighters and joined by Spanish Republicans and then FTP, went up to the Glières plateau to receive parachute drops of weapons and stayed there for two months. It was Alphonse Métral - who, a few years earlier, passed the war memorial of 1870-1871 every day on his way to work - who suggested this motto to Tom Morel, leader of the Maquis des Glières, which was immediately adopted.

This motto is also the title of a song by the group Bérurier Noir.

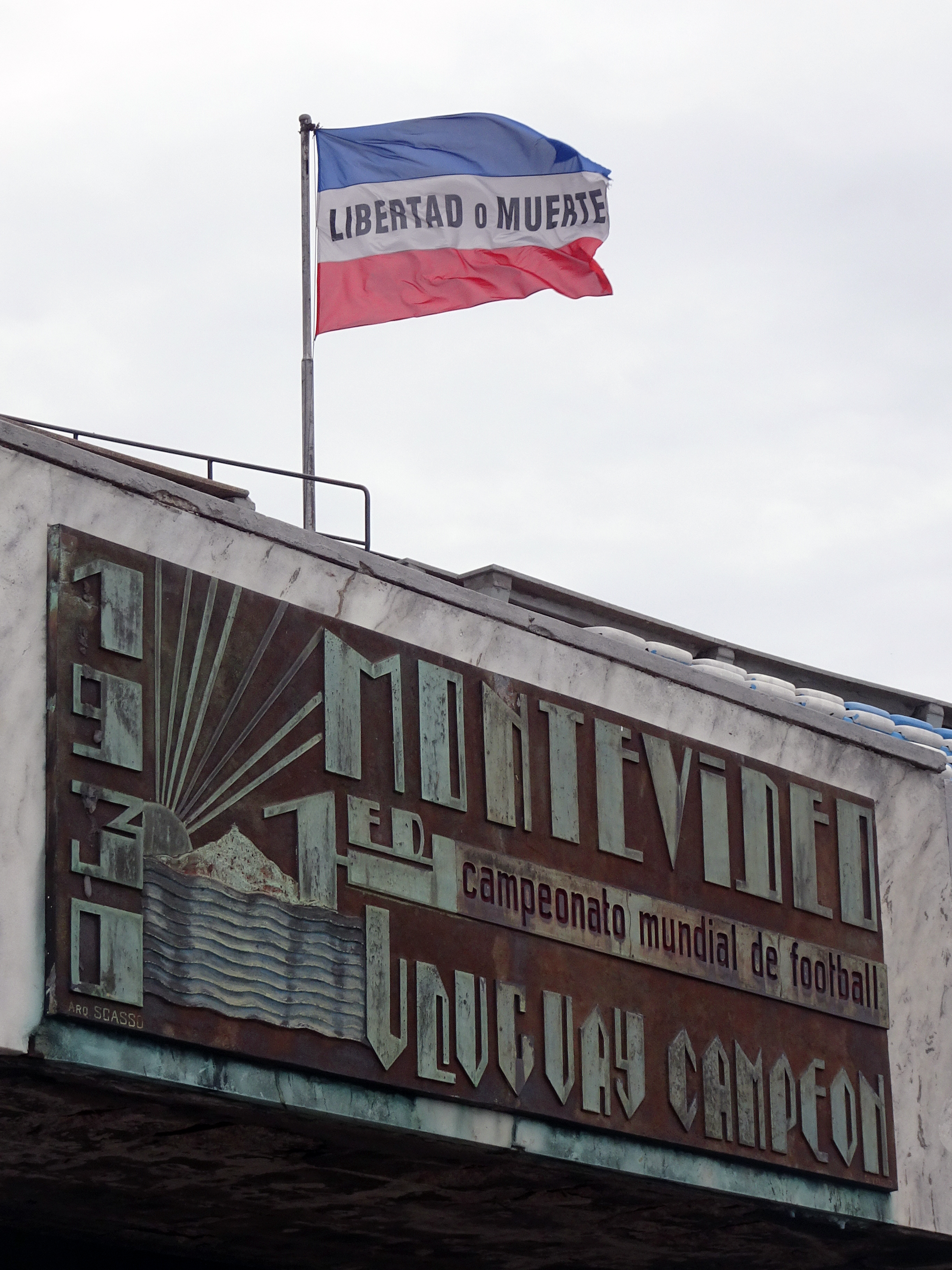
The flag of the Thirty-Three with its motto at the Centenario Stadium in Montevideo.

It is also the official motto of Uruguay. In 1825, it was adopted by the "Thirty-three Orientals", the revolutionary group that fought for independence from Brazil. Since 1952, the motto has appeared on one of the three official flags of Uruguay, the flag of the Thirty-Three.

== See also ==
- La liberté ou la mort
- Live Free or Die
- Elefthería í thánatos
