= Madame Boudray =

Madame Boudray (fl. 1796), was a French militant Jacobin active during the French Revolution.

She was appointed secretary of the Société fraternelle des patriotes de l'un et l'autre sexe in 1791.

She was the owner and manager of the popular café Bains-Chinois in Paris, which was a gathering place for the Jacobins. The Babeuvists used her café as a base, and she was likely the only female member of the Babeuf Conspiracy of the Equals, which resulted in her arrest in 1796.
