= 35th Infantry Regiment (France) =

Infantry regiment of the French Army

- 35^{e} régiment d'infanterie
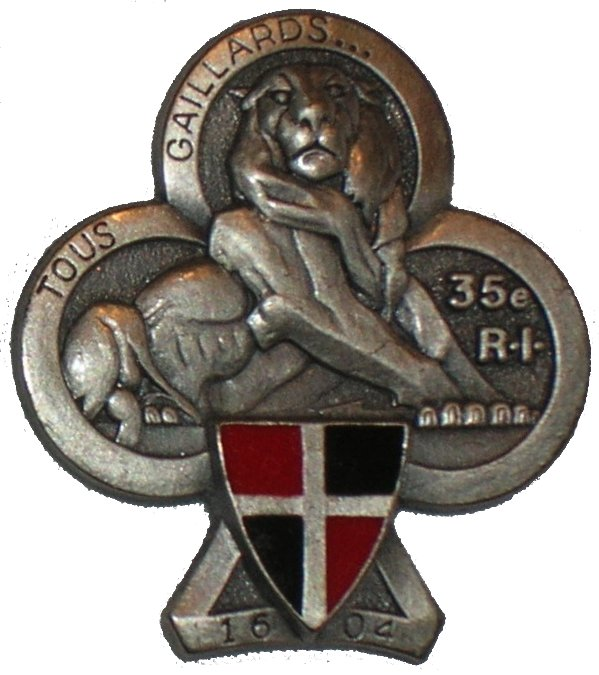
- Regimental badge of the 35th Infantry Regiment
- Active: 1604 — present
- Country: France
- Branch: French Army
- Type: Mechanized infantry
- Garrison/HQ: Belfort
- Nickname: The Ace of Clubs
- Mottos: Tous gaillards, pas d’traînards
- Colours: Yellow
- Anniversaries: 30 June 1830 (Invasion of Algiers)

Insignia
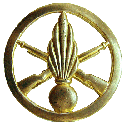
- Identification symbol
- Abbreviation: 35e RI

35th Infantry Regiment (35e régiment d'infanterie) is an infantry regiment of the French Army. Its origins date back to the formation of the régiment de Nemond in 1604 by a member of the gentry from Lorraine whose surname was Némond. During World War I it was nicknamed As de Trèfle (Ace of Clubs). It is now based at the garrison in Belfort.

Notable figures who have served with the regiment or its predecessors include the brothers Louis and Auguste de Keralio (from 1734 to 1749), Étienne-Charles de Damas-Crux (second in command of the régiment d'Aquitaine on 3 October 1779), Maurice Chevalier (in 1913) and Jean Chrétien Fischer.

== Lineage ==
=== Predecessors ===
- 1604 : Creation of the régiment de Nemond
- 1618 : régiment de la Force
- 1661 : régiment de Durfort-Montgomery
- 1665 : régiment de Durfort-Rauzan
- 1670 : régiment Duc d'Anjou
- 1671 : renamed the régiment d'Anjou
- 1753 : renamed the régiment d'Aquitaine
- 1776 : its 2nd and 4th battalions reformed the régiment d'Anjou

== Commanders (1964-present) ==
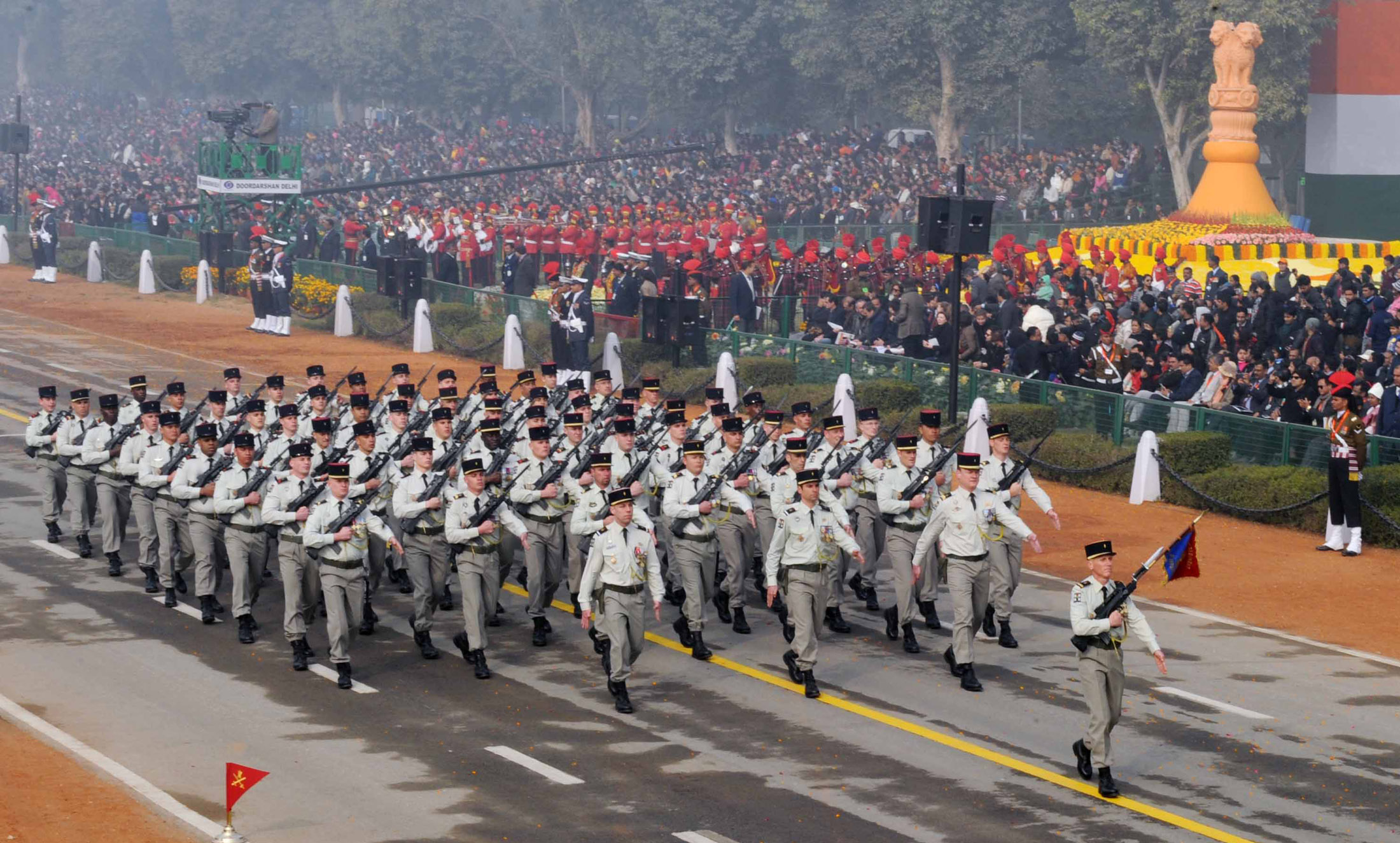
The French Army contingent from the 35th Infantry Regiment passes through the Rajpath during the Delhi Republic Day parade in 2016.

- 1964 - Colonel Dufour
- 1966 - Colonel Claude Vanbremeersch
- 1968 - Colonel de Lavalette
- 1969 - Colonel René Imbot
- 1971 - Colonel Botella
- 1973 - Colonel Poudelet
- 1975 - Colonel Greyfié de Bellecombe
- 1977 - Colonel Jeancolas
- 1979 - Colonel Lacapelle
- 1981 - Colonel Philippe Thérenty
- 1983 - Colonel Philippe Mercier
- 1985 - Colonel Maillols
- 1987 - Colonel d'Ornano
- 1989 - Colonel Kaeppelin
- 1991 - Colonel Diot
- 1993 - Colonel Pelissier
- 1995 - Colonel Barlet
- 1997 - Colonel Boone
- 1999 - Colonel de Foucault
- 2001 - Colonel Egnell
- 2003 - Colonel Duffour
- 2005 - Colonel Dumain
- 2007 - Colonel Duval
- 2009 - Colonel Rondeau
- 2011 - Colonel Bertrand Joret
- 2013 - Colonel Ivan Martin
- 2015 - Lieutenant Colonel Paul Bury
- 2017 - Colonel Christophe Richard
- 2019 - Colonel Jean Augier

== Flags and uniforms ==
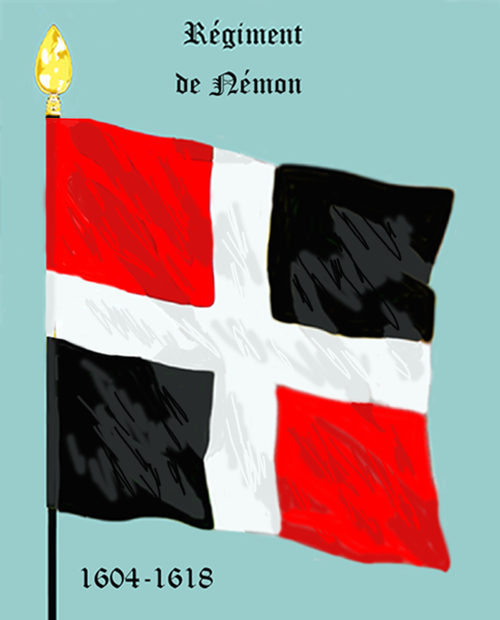
Flag from 1604 to 1618

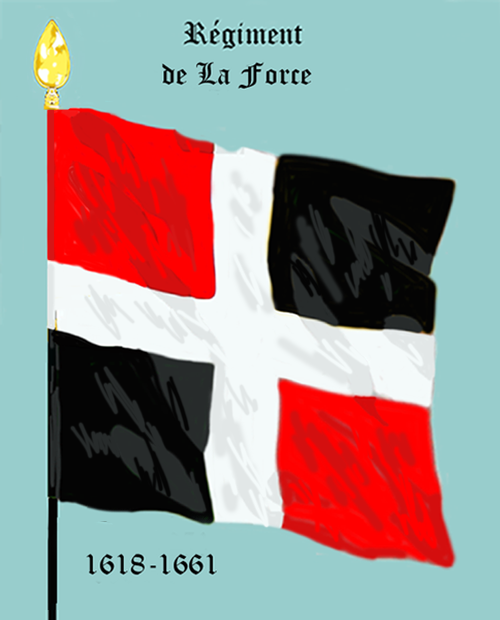
Flag from 1618 to 1661

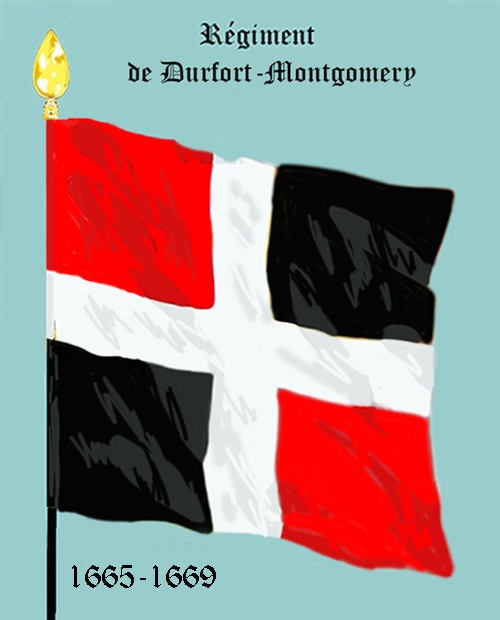
Flag from 1661 to 1665

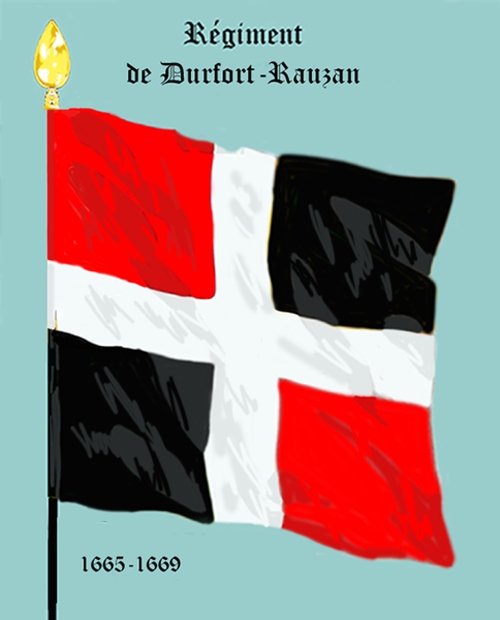
Flag from 1665 to 1669

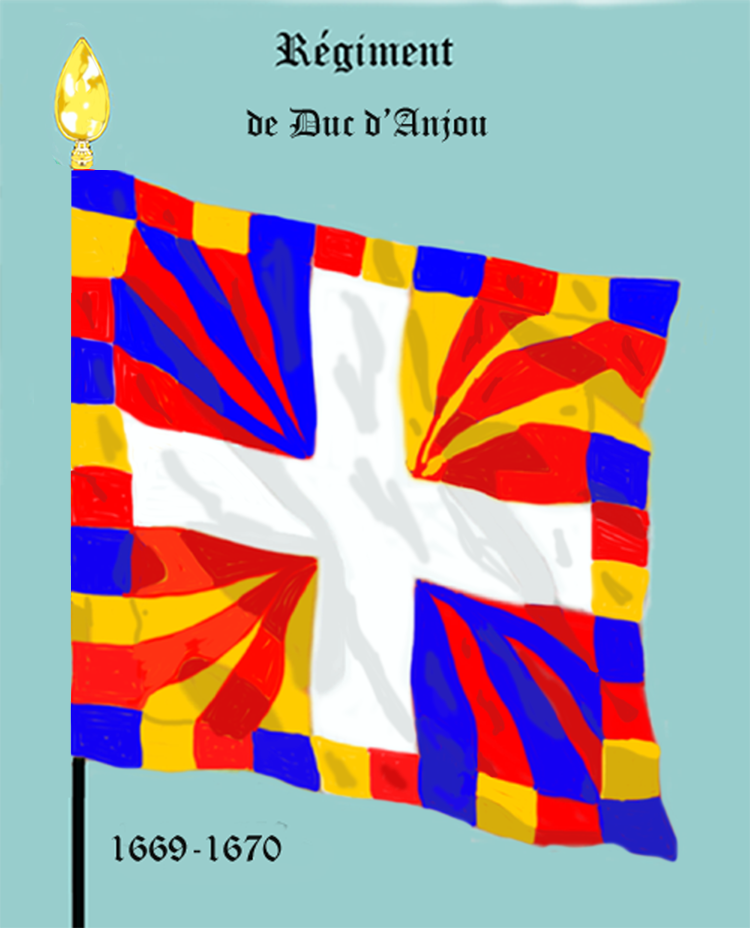
flag 1669 to 1670

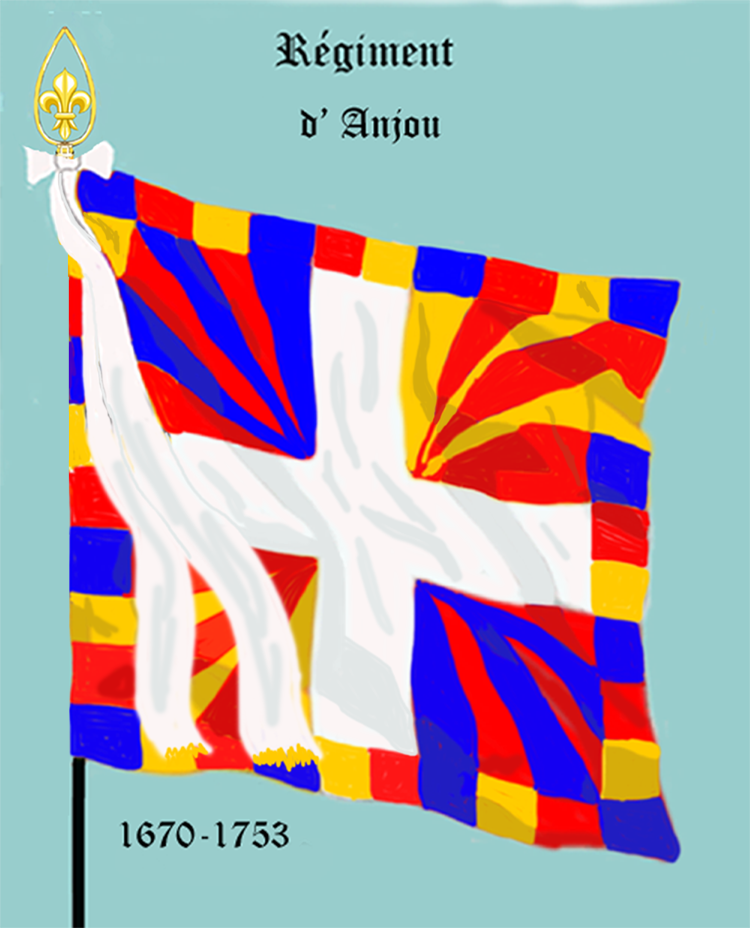
flag from 1670 to 1753

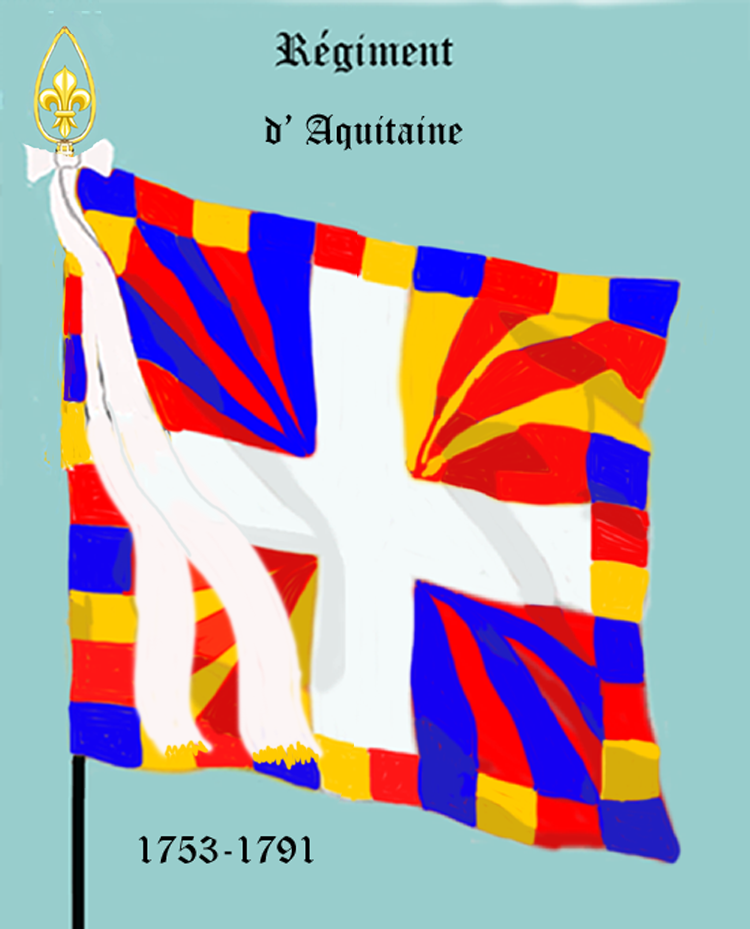
Flag of the Regiment of Aquitaine between 1670 and 1720

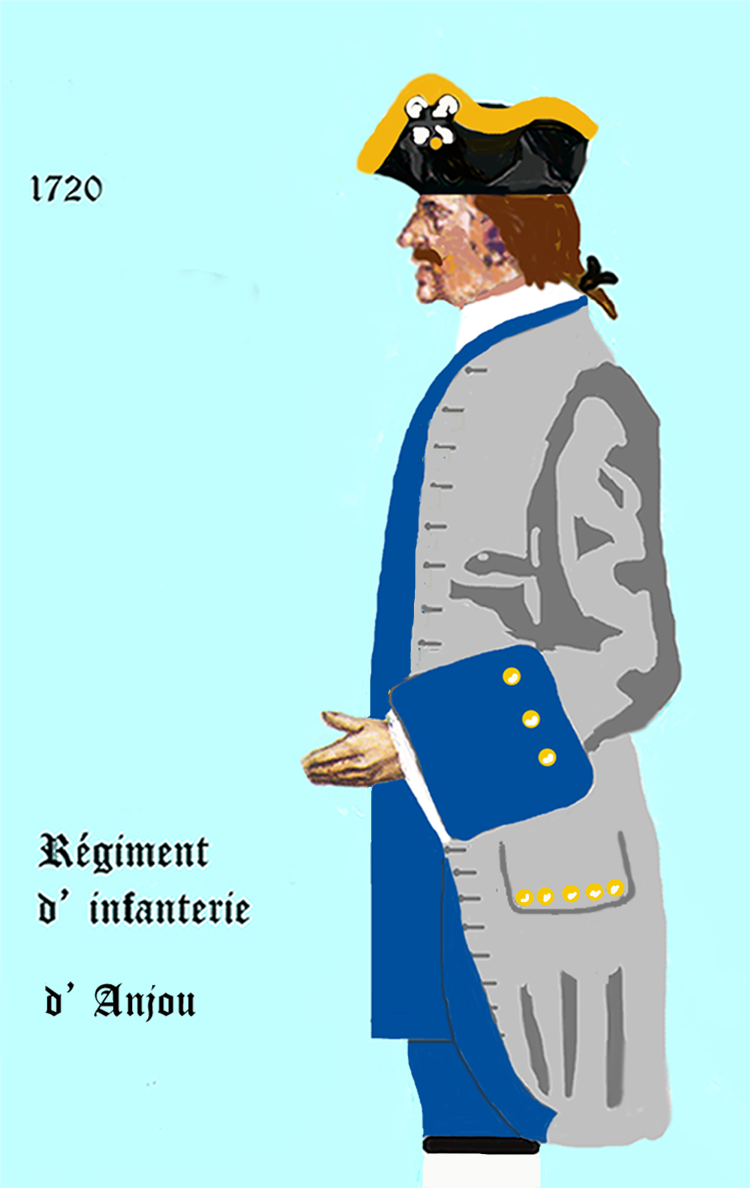
Uniform of the Regiment of Aquitaine in 1720

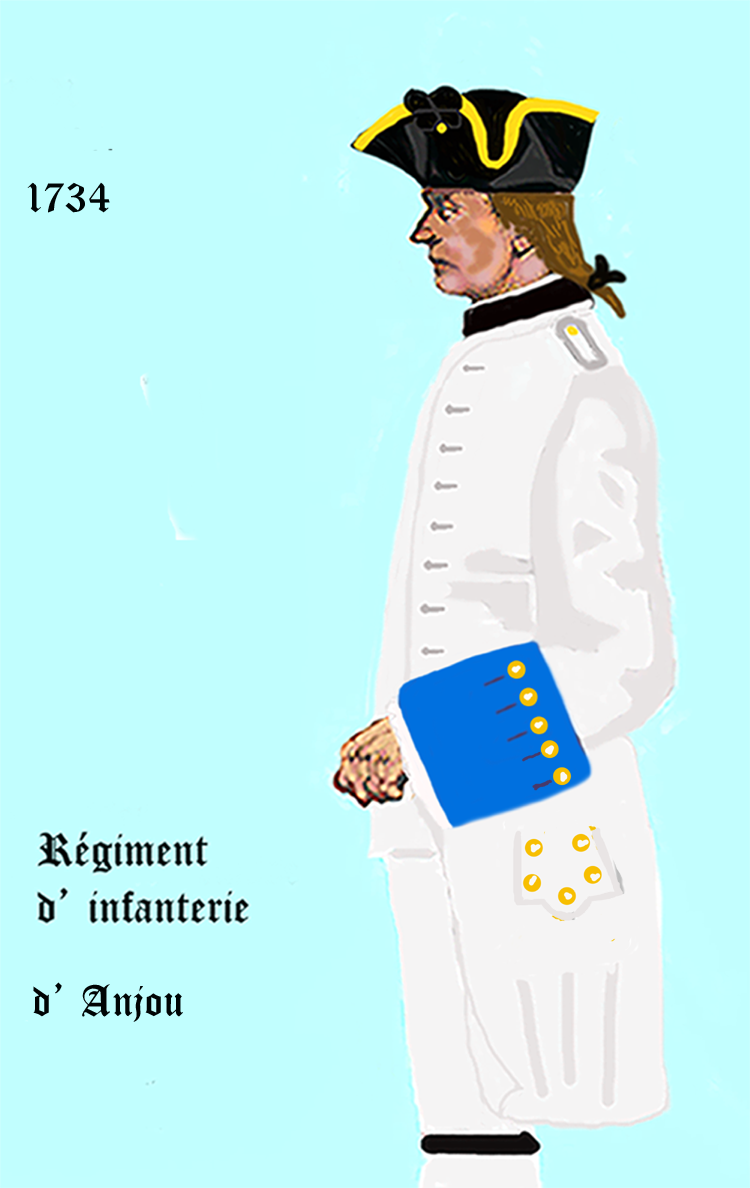
Uniform of the Regiment of Aquitaine in 1734

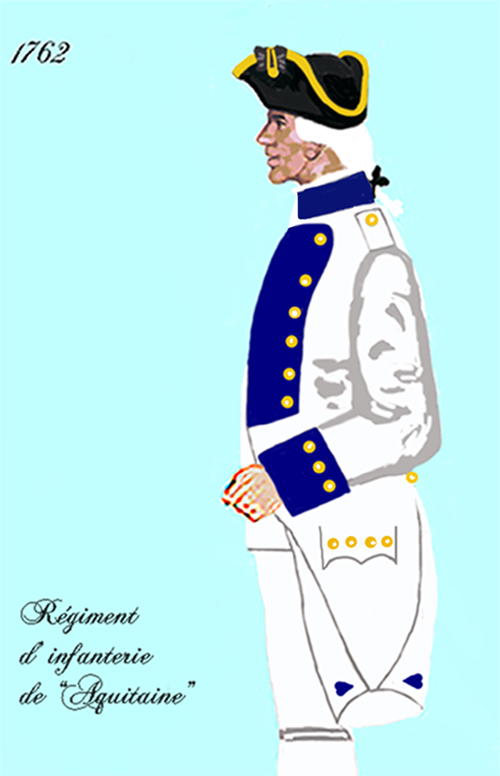
Uniform of the Regiment of Aquitaine between 1762 and 1776

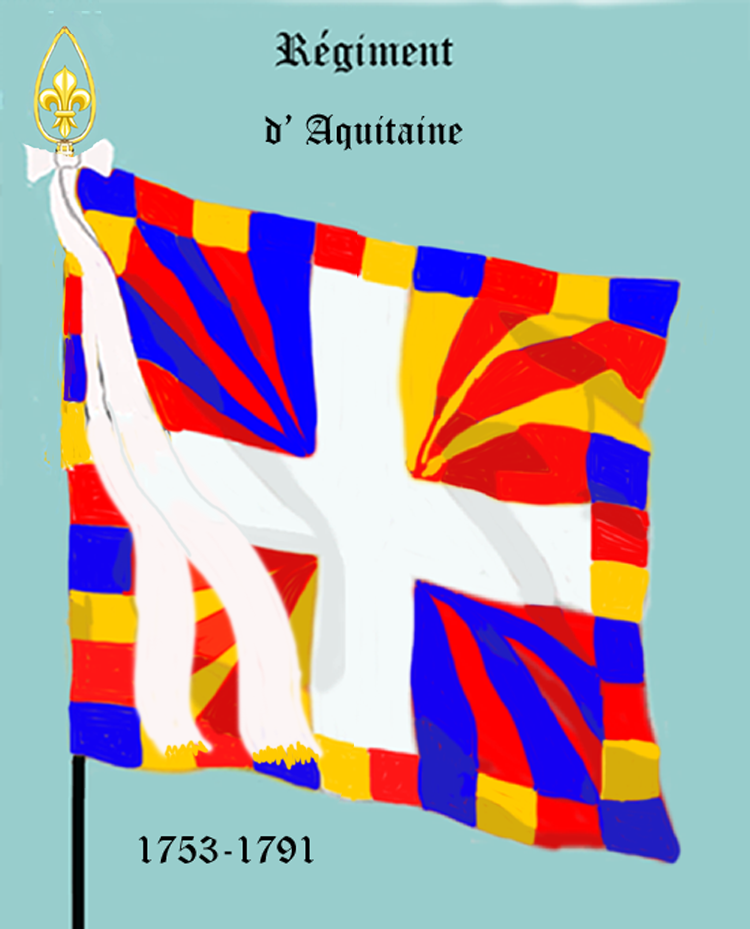
Flag of the Regiment of Aquitaine between 1753 and 1791

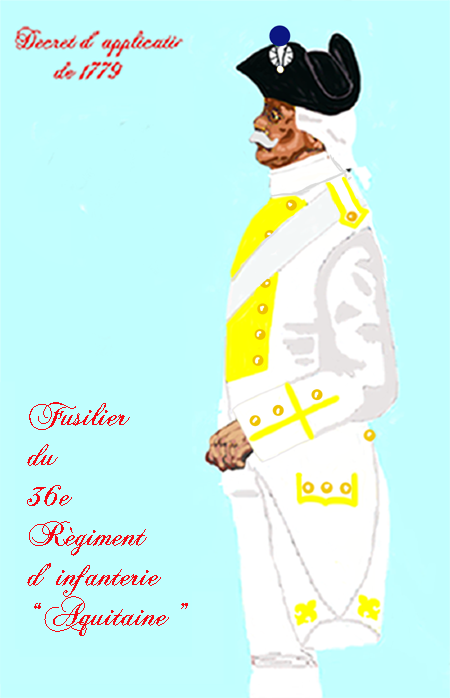
Uniform of the Regiment of Aquitaine between 1779 and 1791

== Present day activities ==
In January 2016, 124 soldiers from the regiment and a ceremonial military band contingent based in Lyon marched down Rajpath in New Delhi for the 67th Republic Day parade. On August 9, 2017, six soldiers from the 35th Infantry Regiment participating in Opération Sentinelle were wounded in Levallois-Perret in the Paris suburbs by an automobile whose driver had fled. The anti-terrorist section of Paris is seized of the investigation.

== Battle honours ==

- 1809 : Wagram
- 1812 : Moskowa
- 1830 : Alger
- 1854 : Sébastopol
- 1914 : Alsace l'Ourcq
- 1915 : Champagne
- 1916 : Verdun
- 1918 : Reims
- 1944 : Résistance Bourgogne
- 1952-1962 : AFN

== Symbols ==
=== Decorations ===
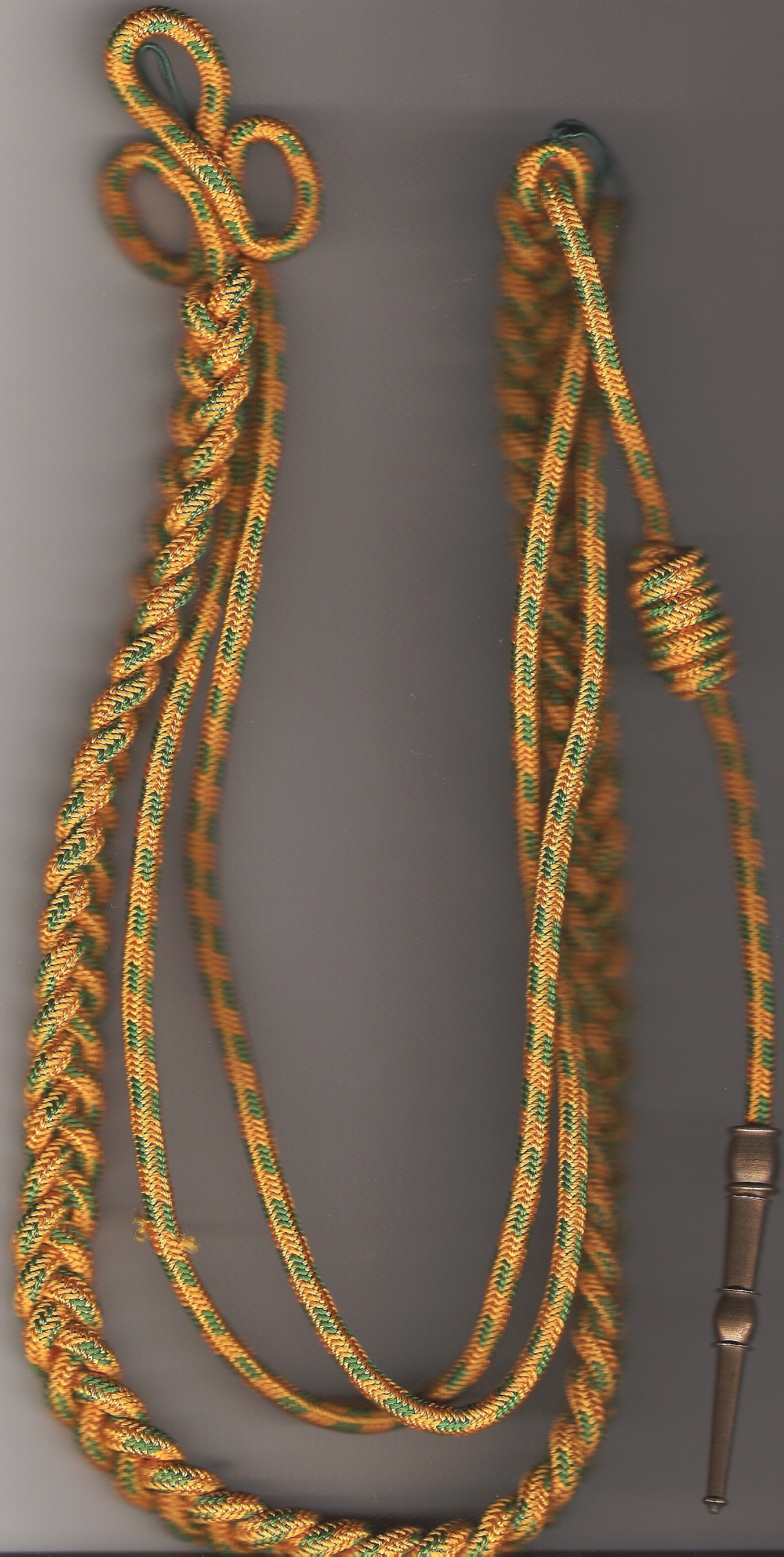
Fourragère in colours of the Médaille militaire worn by soldiers of the 35e RI

Croix de guerre 1914–1918 with four mentions in dispatches.

=== Heraldry ===
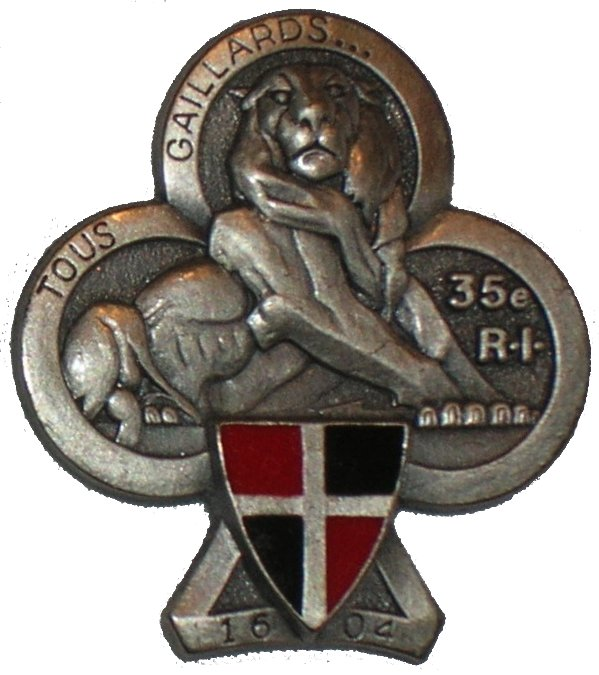

The insignia was created in 1952 and consists of a silver clover, with a bypassed link, placed on a terrace of the same, embellished with the number and the acronym regiment On the dextral slope, the inscription says "Tous gaillards". It symbolizes the courage of the soldiers of Belfort during the Franco-Prussian War.

== Current status ==
=== Composition ===
- Infantry Companies
  - 1er Compagnie - Mechanized infantry company
  - 2e Compagnie - Mechanized infantry company
  - 3e Compagnie - Mechanized infantry company
  - 4e Compagnie - Mechanized infantry company
  - 9e Compagnie - Mechanized infantry company
  - Compagnie d'Appui - Support Company
    - Section d'Appui Direct - Direct Support Section
    - Section tireurs d'élite longue distance - Long Range Sniper Section
    - Section d'aide à l'engagement débarqué - Landed Engagement Assistance Section
- Support Companies
  - Compagnie de commandement et de logistique - Command and logistical support company
  - 5e Compagnie de réserve - Reserve infantry company

== Bibliography ==
- Archives militaires du Château de Vincennes.
- À partir du Recueil d'Historiques de l'Infanterie Française (Général Andolenko - Eurimprim 1969).
- Lieutenant-colonel Bourdiaux, Histoire du 35e régiment d'infanterie
- Pascal Collot, L'As de Trèfle sous les orages d'acier, Les Éditions comtoises, 2002, (ISBN 978-2-914425-13-1)
