= Fraternal Society of Patriots of Both Sexes =

French revolutionary organization

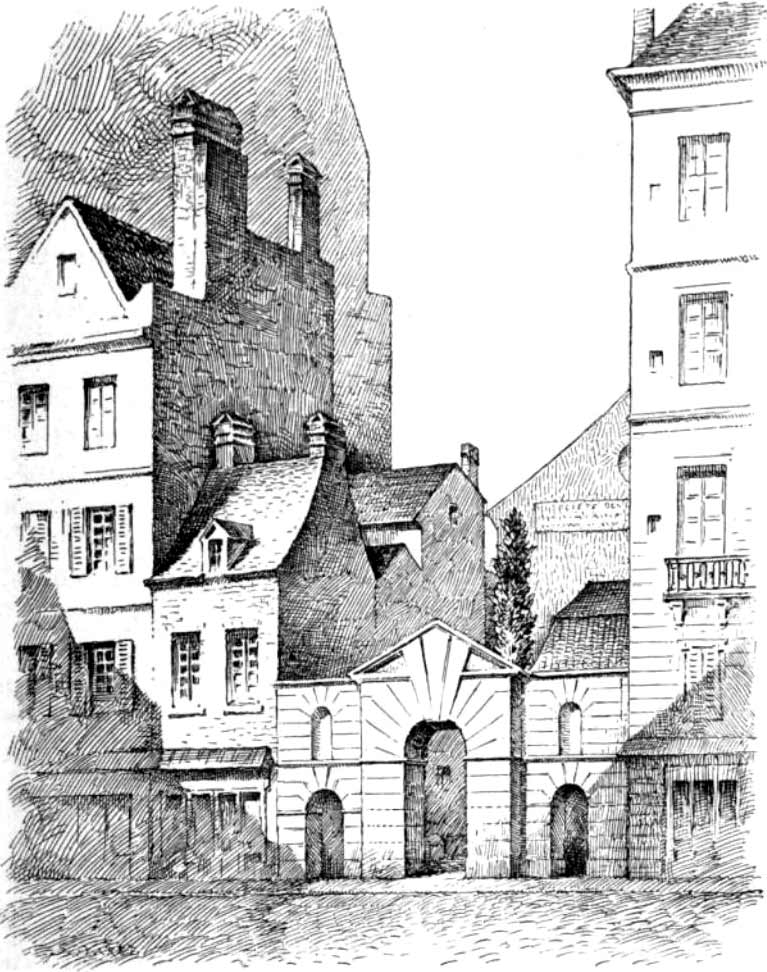
The former Dominican convent in rue Saint-Honoré which hosted the Jacobins and the Fraternal Society, as it was in 1895

The Fraternal Society of Patriots of Both Sexes, Defenders of the Constitution (French: La Société Fraternelle des Patriotes de l'un et l'autre sexe, Défenseurs de la Constitution) was a French revolutionary organization notable in the history of feminism as an early example of active participation of women in politics.

== History ==
The Fraternal Society was founded in October 1790 by Claude Dansard, un maître de pension, or school master. This organization's goal was to provide a civic education that would lead to revolutionary acts becoming a daily occurrence. An original characteristic of this group was that they were widely inclusive to women. Originally, the organization's meeting place was an old library room of the disused Dominican (called "Jacobins" in France) convent on Rue Saint-Honoré, the one which hosted the revolutionary Jacobin Club. It has been suggested that the Fraternal Society grew out of the regular occupants of a special gallery allocated to women at the Jacobin Club.

Within this organization there were two secretary posts that were guaranteed to women at all times. The other positions would be divided up among the men and women members, making it much more egalitarian than previous revolutionary organizations. However the role of President was always held by a man. The women and men sat among each other and each member referred to one another as "brother" and "sister". The women possessed the same membership cards as men and were permitted to vote on matters.

The members of this organization, of which Pépin Degrouhette, Tallien and Merlin de Thionville were at one point presidents, debated the subject of liberty, France, and the Constitution with a zeal that was seen as surpassing that of the Jacobins.

The Fraternal Society lent the energy of their female members to long speeches of the Jacobins, which were cheered by female participants. who frequently rallied and energized their fellow revolutionaries. There was also a strong bond between this revolutionary club and the others who shared the same democratic views, such as the Cordeliers, with whom they would sometimes organize rallies.

== Famous members ==
- Etta Palm d'Aelders
- Louise-Félicité de Kéralio
- Pauline Léon
- Jacques-René Hébert
- Marie Marguerite Françoise Hébert
- Anne-Josèphe Théroigne de Méricourt
- François Robert
- Jean-Lambert Tallien
- Antoine Merlin de Thionville
- Madame Boudray
- Jean-François Varlet

== See also ==
- Society of Revolutionary Republican Women
