= Auguste de Keralio =

French military and nobleman

Auguste de Keralio (c. 1715 – 1805) was a French military man. He was made a knight of the Order of Saint Louis and gentleman of the chamber to the Prince of Parma on 2 October 1760. He was also known as the marquis of Keralio.

== Life ==
=== Military career ===
The son of the squire François Fiacre Guinement, seigneur de Keralio and of Marguerite Rose Bodin, Auguste entered the military academy in the citadel at Metz on 15 June 1732, aged just 17. He was made a lieutenant in the Carhaix battalion of the Brittany militia on 1 August 1733. He stayed in it until 8 February 1734, when he joined the régiment d'infanterie d'Anjou, in which his elder brother Felix François Guinement lost his life whilst serving as a lieutenant at the Siege of Philippsbourg on 18 July 1734.

Auguste saw action in the War of the Polish Succession – in May 1734 served at the battle at Colorno. He also fought at San Pietro before his regiment was sent to relieve the bataillon du Dauphin, then blockaded by Imperial forces at Secchia (18 September 1734). He fought at Guastalla on 21 September, where one of his contemporaries from the Metz military school, lieutenant Charles de Pagès, was seriously wounded. After the capture of Mirandole, Keralio was sent into winter quarters at San Secondo in the Duchy of Parma.

In 1735 he took part in the capture of the castles at Gonazgue, Reggiolo and Revere, for which he was made an aide-major on 29 August that year. He returned to France in September 1736. On 13 January 1741 he was made a captain and put in command of a company of the 2nd battalion of the régiment d'Anjou, fighting with them in the Bohemian theatre of the War of the Austrian Succession. As a capitaine aide-major, he was second-in-command to the regiment's colonel, the marquis d'Armentières, at Egra in June 1742, during the Siege of Prague. In 1747 de Belle-Ile put de Keralio in command of the Fourrages army depot in Marseille. In 1749 he left the army, but at the request of Louise-Élisabeth was later given the rank of 'colonel réformé' in 1757.

=== Under-governor to Ferdinand of Parma ===
In 1754 he was made preceptor to the young count of Gisors, de Belle-Isle's son, and accompanied him on his Grand Tour of Europe. During this he met Frederick II of Prussia, Maria Theresa I, Empress of Hungary, George II of Great Britain and many other monarchs. In 1756 he became secretary to his close friend the Duke of Nivernais during the latter's embassy to the King of Prussia.

He was made an honorary member of the Academy of Fine Arts of Parma on its creation in 1757, writing to it from Paris. That year also saw the Duke of Nivernais recommending de Keralio to Louis XV as one of the three under-governors to Louis de France or as sub-governor to the infant Ferdinand, Duke of Parma. He and abbé Condillac were put in charge of Ferdinand's education from 8 March 1757 to 1769, teaching him philosophical ideas, putting intelligence and understanding at the centre of his education and attempting to mould him as a philosopher-king. Surrounded by the clergy of Parma and representatives of the Austrian court, Ferdinand was unable to put his knowledge and education into practice.

On his return to France, he was granted a pension of 10,000 livres by Louis XVI, a pension of 10,000 reales billon by Charles III of Spain on the commandery of Onda belonging to the Order of Montesa and an apartment in the palais du Luxembourg, where he became a neighbour of the future Louis XVIII. From 1769 until his death de Keralio divided his time between his apartment and the hôtel de Tournon, residence of the Duke of Nivernais. He regularly helped Condorcet translate mathematical texts and became his secretary between 1770 and 1780. De Keralio was imprisoned for several months during the Reign of Terror and was only saved from the guillotine by the intervention of his niece Louise-Félicité de Kéralio. He died in Paris in 1805 aged 90.

== Bibliography ==
- Camille Rousset, « Le Comte de Gisors, 1732-1758, étude historique », Paris, Perrin et Cie, libraires-éditeurs, 1868.
- Lucien Perey, « Le duc de Nivernais », Paris, Calmann Levy éditeur, 1891.
- Élisabeth Badinter, « Les passions intellectuels, volonté de pouvoir (1762-1778) », Paris, Fayard, avril 2007.
- Élisabeth Badinter, « L'infant de Parme », Paris, Fayard, mai 2008.
- François Moal, « La Tour d'Auvergne, un homme de la Bretagne Centrale mort au champ d'honneur », Nature et Bretagne, Carhaix, 1995.
- Correspondance de Auguste de Keralio et de Paola Frisi.
