= Paris Revolutions =

18th-century French newspaper

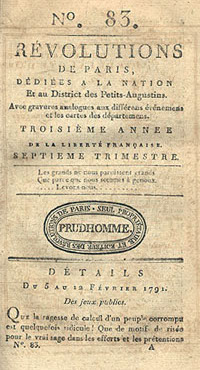
- Weekly paper "Révolutions de Paris" No.83 (Week 5 February 1791)
- Format: Daily newspaper
- Founded: 12 July 1789
- Language: French
- Ceased publication: 28 February 1794
- City: Paris
- Country: Kingdom of France; French Republic

Paris Revolutions was a French daily newspaper published during the French Revolution from 1789 to 1794.

== History ==
From 12 July 1789, the date of its first publication, the daily newspaper enjoyed great success. Camille Desmoulins advanced the figure of two hundred thousand readers which appears exaggerated. The newspaper was pro-revolutionary, but readers with moderate opinions appreciated the subtlety of its political analyses.

The main editors of the journal were Elisée Loustalot, Sylvain Maréchal, Pierre-Gaspard Chaumette, Fabre d'Églantine, Léger-Félicité Sonthonax.

On 28 February 1794, the publisher Louis Marie Prudhomme ceased the publication of his newspaper. Pro-revolutionary in 1789, he was suspected of modérantisme under the Reign of Terror and chose to cease publication to avoid execution.

== Bibliography ==
- (in French) Jean Tulard, Jean-François Fayard and Alfred Fierro, Histoire et dictionnaire de la Révolution française. 1789–1799, Robert Laffont, Bouquins collection, Paris, 1987 (ISBN 270282076X)
