= Louise-Félicité de Kéralio =

French writer, editor

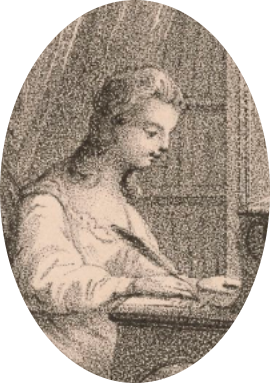
Louise-Félicité de Kéralio

Louise-Félicité Guynement de Kéralio (25 August 1758 in Valence, Drôme – 31 December 1821 in Brussels) was a French writer and translator, originating from the minor Breton nobility.

Her father was Louis-Félix Guynement de Kéralio, who had served as tutor to the Prince of Parma together with Condillac and taught at the École Militaire until 1776, and her mother was the translator and writer Françoise Abeille de Keralio. She was present at the court of Versailles between October 1777 and April 1782. She married Pierre-François-Joseph Robert, a politician, revolutionary and secretary to Georges Danton, in 1790.

== Literary activities ==
She translated her first book when she was only 16 and wrote her first novel, Adélaide, when she was just 18. As a translator she made books by Henry Swinburne, John Gregory, John Howard and Riguccio Galluzzi available to the French public.

From 1786 to 1789 she edited a 14-volume collection of French works written by women, entitled Collection des meilleurs ouvrages François composés par des femmes (Collection of the best French works written by women). She was unable to complete it

On 3 February 1787 she was elected to the Academie of Arras, where she was received by its President Maximilien Robespierre. From 1786 or 1787 she was also a member of the Patriotic Breton Society, founded by her uncle, the economist Louis-Paul Abeille.

== Political activities ==
During the French Revolution she was politically active and assumed a number of roles that were unusual for women, including being a member of the Cordeliers Club where her husband was president for a time, and of the Fraternal Society of Patriots of Both Sexes.

On 13 August 1789 she founded le Journal d’État et du Citoyen, thereby becoming the first woman to be editor in chief of a journal. Over the next two years she edited a number of other journals, which were essentially vehicles for her views on society, rights and the revolution – Le Mercure national, ou Journal d’État et du Citoyen, then Le Mercure national et Révolutions de l’Europe and finally Le Mercure national et étranger, ou Journal politique de l’Europe. She ended her career as a political writer in July 1791 a few months before the birth of her daughter.

Kéralio held strong, though moderate views on the role of women. For example, when the political theorist Sieyès proposed in 1789 that the future constitution should make women and children 'passive citizens', the Journal d'etat et du citoyen commented:

'We don't understand what he means when he says that not all citizens can take an active part in the formation of the active powers of the government, that women and children can have no influence on the polity. Certainly, women and children are not employed. But is this the only way of actively influencing the polity? The discourses, the sentiments, the principles engraved on the souls of children from their earliest youth, which it is women's lot to take care of, the influence which they transmit, in society, among their servants, their retainers, are these indifferent to the fatherland?

Following the Flight to Varennes, the Central Committee of popular societies, which Kéralio and Robert coordinated, circulated a petition declaring that Louis XVI had deserted his post, that by this act of perjury had in fact abdicated, and that the signatories no longer owed allegiance to the king. A signing ceremony was organised for the Champ de Mars the following day, and this led to the Champ de Mars Massacre.

== After the Revolution ==
Her husband, Robert, was named prefect of Rocroi during the Hundred Days, but as he had voted for the death of Louis XVI, the couple had to go into exile in Brussels under Louis XVIII. In Brussels Robert became a wine merchant.
